= March of the Eagles =

2013 grand strategy video game

- Developer(s): Paradox Development Studio
- Publisher(s): Paradox Interactive
- Engine: Clausewitz Engine
- Platform(s): Microsoft Windows, OS X
- Release: Microsoft Windows; 19 February 2013; OS X 9 May 2013
- Genre(s): Grand strategy
- Mode(s): Single player, multiplayer

March of the Eagles is a grand strategy video game developed by Paradox Interactive and released on 19 February 2013. The game centres on the time period of 1805–1820. It started life as a sequel to AGEOD's Napoleon's Campaigns, and was originally titled Napoleon's Campaigns II. As AGEOD was bought by Paradox, they developed and retitled the game. Virtual Programming released a Mac OS X version of the game on 9 May 2013.

== Gameplay ==
March of the Eagles is a game that allows the player to control any of the major European powers during the timeframe of 1803–1815, which was the era of the Napoleonic Wars. Like other Paradox strategy games, the player makes decisions based around the armed forces, production, and diplomacy. March of the Eagles also incorporates different victory conditions for different nations.

=== Domination ===
France starts as the dominant land power in the game, and Great Britain starts as the dominant naval power. A major focus of the game is on coalitions, which can only be formed by either dominant power. So if Russia replaced France as the dominant land power, it would lead the coalition against the dominant naval power (Great Britain at the beginning). An in-game ledger will allow the player to keep track of who is dominant, and who their closest rival is. Any other country can become dominant by taking control of specific provinces.

For major powers, Land Dominance and Naval Dominance are crucial factors in victory, and for minor powers, it is the success of your alliance which can lead to victory.

=== Ideas ===
The game also uses "ideas", which replace the technology tree used in similar Paradox games. Idea points are gained through battles, and losing a battle can earn your nation more idea points than winning, balancing the game as it goes on. Ideas can have a wide-ranging effect on the country, affect land combat, naval combat, finance, and manpower. The major powers also have a section of ideas specific to them.

Unlike some other strategy games from Paradox, you can customize the formation of your armies to (for example) determine which units go on which flanks.

=== Major powers ===
The major powers in the game are:

- First French Empire
- Austrian Empire
- Ottoman Empire
- Kingdom of Spain
- Kingdom of Sweden
- United Kingdom
- Russian Empire
- Kingdom of Prussia

=== Minor powers ===
The minor powers in the game consist of the other European states in existence in 1805, such as the Kingdom of Portugal, the Kingdom of Naples, the Kingdom of Denmark, and the Batavian Republic.

== Development ==
Chris King (who also worked on other Clausewitz Engine based Paradox games such as Victoria II and Sengoku) was the game designer for March of the Eagles. Originally, it was called Napoleon's Campaigns II.

The original Napoleon's Campaigns was released by AGEOD in 2007, and Paradox acquired the company in December 2009. Paradox had a vision to create the sequel drawing on the war influences of Hearts of Iron, the look and feel of Europa Universalis, and the ability to "win", such as in Sengoku. The beta was released in August 2012.

== Reception ==
Reception

Aggregate score
Aggregator	Score
Metacritic	71/100

Review score
Publication	Score
IGN	7.9/10

Upon release, the game had an aggregated score on 73 on Metacritic. Writing about the game, IGN said "March of the Eagles may have more limited ambitions than its grand strategy cousins, but in limiting its goals it makes its successes more evident. It's a relatively brief and accessible strategy experience that's good alone and better with friends." It also received praise for its multiplayer mode in particular. Destructoid said "The diplomacy, backstabbing, and rivalry that I love so much remains very much intact when you add in human opponents, especially in a LAN setting, and it was genuinely one of the most enjoyable experiences I've ever had with a grand strategy title."

However, some reviews (including IGN) did comment on the perceived lack of depth in comparison to other Paradox titles.

== See also ==
- List of grand strategy video games
- List of Paradox Interactive games
- List of PC games
