= Europa Universalis: Crown of the North =

2000 video game

- German cover art
- Developer: Paradox Interactive
- Publishers: SWE: Levande Böcker; EU: PAN Vision; DE: Koch Media; NA: Strategy First
- Producer: Patric Backlund
- Designer: Joakim Bergqwist
- Programmer: Johan Andersson
- Artist: Daniel Nygren
- Composer: Martin Eriksson
- Engine: Europa Engine
- Platform: Microsoft Windows
- Release: SWE: 2000; EU: 2003; NA: July 22, 2003
- Genres: Real-time strategy, Grand strategy
- Modes: Single player, multiplayer

Europa Universalis: Crown of the North (original title: Svea Rike III) is a real-time grand strategy video game developed by Paradox Interactive and published by Levande Böcker. It is the sequel to Svea Rike and Svea Rike II, and had its own sequel, Two Thrones. The Svea Rike series is the predecessor to Europa Universalis.

The plot takes place from the year 1275 in Scandinavia during a period of political disturbance. All events that take place in the game, with the exception of player-initiated events, are based on reality. The game's scenario ends in the year 1340, and the player's king will get a win if he has collected the most points or eliminated all opponents.

Europa Universalis: Crown of the North is the English-language version of the Swedish based game titled Svea Rike III. It was released in North America together with a re-release of Europa Universalis II at version 1.07, with the addition of new scenarios.

The main title of the digital game, Europa Universalis, is derived from a 1993 namesake board game from France. Although, the board game was mainly used as the base for the subsequent title, Europa Universalis.

== Reception ==
The game received "mixed or average" reviews on Metacritic.

== See also ==
- List of grand strategy video games
- List of Paradox Interactive games
- List of historical video games
