= Victoria II =

2010 grand strategy video game

- Developer: Paradox Development Studio
- Publishers: WW: Paradox Interactive Virtual Programming (Mac); RU: 1C/Snowball Studios
- Director: Thomas Johansson
- Producer: Johan Andersson
- Designers: Johan Andersson; Christopher King
- Artists: Jonas Jakobsson; Fredrik Toll
- Composer: Andreas Waldetoft
- Engine: Clausewitz Engine
- Platforms: Microsoft Windows; Mac OS X
- Release: August 13, 2010: Microsoft Windows; WW: August 13, 2010 Mac OS X; WW: September 17, 2010
- Genres: Grand strategy
- Modes: Single-player, multiplayer

Victoria II is a grand strategy game developed by the Swedish game company Paradox Development Studio and published by Paradox Interactive. It was announced on August 19, 2009, and released on August 13, 2010. It is a sequel to Victoria: An Empire Under the Sun.

Virtual Programming published the Mac OS X version of the game on September 17, 2010, which is available on the App Store.

Like its predecessor, Victoria II has the player control one of approximately 200 states of the world between 1836 and 1936. The player is in charge of a number of tools for managing the economy, science, domestic politics, diplomacy, army and navy. The main difference from other global strategies of Paradox Interactive is a significant emphasis on the details of internal processes occurring in the state, and the developed system of diplomacy available to the great powers. The game has many historical aspects to it, such as the ability to colonize places that, at the time, were not under the control of any European power, such as Sub-Saharan Africa, North and Western Canada, and parts of Asia. Additionally, the game possesses a multiplayer mode, in which up to 32 players can play simultaneously.

In 2021 Paradox announced a sequel, Victoria 3, which was released October 25, 2022.

== Development ==
A sequel for Victoria: An Empire Under the Sun was announced on August 19, 2009, as part of GamesCon 2009. Johan Andersson, the lead programmer for Paradox Interactive at the time, talked about the changes in gameplay compared to the previous game and showed the first screenshots of the game, which showed a map of Europe and various interface elements.

Shortly after the announcement of the game, the head of Paradox Interactive Studios, Fredrik Wester, publicly stated that, due to the low sales of the first game, he did not believe in the success of Victoria 2, he voted for another project to be put in development, and that he was ready to shave his head should the game see a profit. On the contrary, Johan Andersson, the initiator of the project, was confident that the game would be successful, referring to the requests and votes by fans and the opinion of the development team. In the end, Andersson and Wester made a bet that, if Victoria 2 was successful, Wester would shave his head, and if it was not, he would have sole control over which game would release next. It was revealed in a German interview with Fredrik that 70,000 copies would need to be sold for Victoria II to be profitable. On June 17, 2010, when it became known that there would be many pre-orders giving the game good sales, Wester asked Jessica Chobot at IGN to shave his head and upload the pictures to Twitter.

The game was developed by a development team consisting of producer, designer and programmer Johan Andersson, project leader and programmer Thomas Johansson, designer and tester Christopher King, programmers Dan Lind, Fredrik Zetterman, Olof Björk, Henrik Vohraeus, Bjorn Johannessen, Sara Wendel-Ertqvist, artists Yunus Jakobsson, Fredrik Persson and composer Andreas Waldetoft. The development team covered the progress of development in their diaries, which were published to Paradox's official forum by Christopher King. Between November 2009 and June 2010, 29 numbered diaries and two bonus diaries were published.

A working beta version of Victoria II was demonstrated in June 2010 at the E3 show held in Los Angeles. The game was presented by the producer, Johan Andersson, who demonstrated the main gameplay and talked about innovations the game would bring. On August 10, 2010, a playable demo was released, allowing you to play as the United States.

== Gameplay ==
System requirements
Recommended
Operating System	Windows XP/Vista/7
CPU	Intel® Pentium® IV 2.4 GHz or AMD Athlon XP 3500+ 2.4 GHz
RAM	2 GB
Free storage space	2 GB
VRAM	256 MB
Sound card	Compatible with DirectX
Input devices	Keyboard, mouse

A preview image of Victoria II showing the political map mode, interfaces, and Northern Italy in 1836

Victoria II spans the globe from 1836 to 1936 with over 200 playable nations. Like its predecessor, Victoria II focuses on internal management, covering the industrialization and social/political changes in a country with 8 different government types. The game gives a lot of importance to the economy of a country by having a complex market system with over 50 types of goods and factories. While warfare is a component of the game it is not the primary focus as in other Paradox Interactive games such as the Hearts of Iron series.

Nations' populations are divided into cultures, religions, classes and occupations. There are several different population groups (or "pops"), such as aristocrats, army officers, clergy, soldiers, labourers, slaves, bureaucrats and others. As in other Paradox titles such as Europa Universalis, historical missions called "decisions", which are micro-objectives in the larger game, have been added. There are thousands of historical events and decisions as well. These events and decisions can lead to the creation or disintegration of nation states.

Victoria II contains a number of changes and improvements from its predecessor. The interface was streamlined when compared to the original game, which was described by producer Johan Andersson as, "the interface that God forgot". Automation of various tasks has been added, including trade and population promotion. The education system has received an overhaul by having clergy educate people, and each population group now has their own literacy levels. Education and literacy's importance is reflected in the vast technology system that contains thousands of inventions. Additionally, the functioning of ideology in the game was tweaked such that population groups are more sensitive to changes in their country's situation, as well as inclined to agitate for specific levels of political and social reforms.

=== Economy ===
The economic system in Victoria II attempts to simulate the flow of resources in a world market. Every province in the game produces a resource in resource gathering operations (RGOs). Some resources, such as wheat, are demanded principally by the population. Other materials, like iron, are consumed primarily by industry, but are still tradeable.

The production and unemployment system from the original Victoria has been revised to better reflect market forces, whereas in the original, the state provided the funds for resources and the player possessed a wide range of options with which to build their economy, provided they had access to the proper raw materials. All resources can be collected or produced by industry. The game also has a cottage production system simulating pre-industrial economies.

=== Diplomacy ===
Victoria II contains a deep political simulation reflected in 8 different types of governments, 7 ideologies and a new sphere of influence system, gunboat diplomacy, and a new election system with coalition governments and legislatures.

The diplomacy in Victoria II is similar to that of other Paradox titles. Each country has a relation value of −200 to +200 which represents how much they like each other. Diplomatic and in-game actions shift this relationship around and it factors into the AI's decisions. However, Paradox Interactive has expanded parts of this system. War goals from Heir to the Throne, an expansion for Europa Universalis III have been integrated though they function in a slightly different way. More war goals can be added as the war progresses, although this depends on the population's temperament. Failure to achieve a war goal will increase the population's militancy, which can lead to revolts as well as a loss of prestige.

In the game controlling a Great Power, one of the eight countries with highest total score, gives special diplomatic options not available to other countries. Great Powers do not just influence how a country sees them; they have the added ability to use their influence on other countries to change their perception of other Great Powers. The struggle for influence that the Great Powers wage around the world is not a simple bilateral basis but occurs with each other inside different countries, giving an added dimension to diplomacy which was not present in the original Victoria.

=== Warfare ===
Warfare is regarded as a lesser priority than politics and economics in Victoria II, though it follows the basic pattern used in other Paradox grand strategy games of its generation, with armies moving between provinces and engaging enemy armies and capturing enemy territory. The basic combat system is a combination of the systems used in Europa Universalis III, Europa Universalis: Rome, and Hearts of Iron III. A key component to combat is "frontage": the number of units in an army at the front line, which decreases as technology improves to simulate the change from the roving armies of the Napoleonic Era to the continuous trench lines of World War I.

Several aspects of the military have been changed from Victoria. The base unit has been reduced from a 10,000-unit division to a 3,000-unit brigade, which is no longer raised from a national manpower pool but directly raised from a provincial soldier POP, to which the brigade remains connected. A new aspect to the military is reconnaissance. This is a value that gives a bonus (or penalty, if low) to capturing provinces and defeating enemy armies; in prolonged combat, however, the reconnaissance value drops. Units such as cavalry and aeroplanes have high reconnaissance values and are intended to be used as scouts. The overall objective is to move your country on into a new era, in a period of great change.

== Expansions ==
Victoria II has received two main expansion packs, as well as minor cosmetic DLC.

=== A House Divided ===
Victoria II: A House Divided
- Developer: Paradox Development Studio
- Publisher: Paradox Interactive
- Engine: Clausewitz Engine
- Platform: Microsoft Windows
- Release: February 2, 2012: Microsoft Windows; WW: February 2, 2012 Mac OS X; WW: March 30, 2012
- Genres: Single-player, multiplayer
- Mode: Single-player

A House Divided was announced at the Electronic Entertainment Expo 2011 as an expansion pack with an aim on "[improving the] political and economical aspects of the game, with focus on the American Civil War era". It was released on February 2, 2012, for Windows and on March 30, 2012, for OS X; it is currently only available for purchase by download. It includes the following features:

- A new starting point in 1861, allowing players to experience the American Civil War from the start.
- The ability to manufacture reasons to go to war with other countries, all in the name of the great game of power.
- For uncivilized countries, various new reform paths to ultimately become equal to the western nations.
- The ability for Great Powers to invest in building infrastructure and factories in other countries to strengthen their ties to them.
- A deeper political system with new national focus options and new types of reform.
- A new system of popular movements that can be appeased or suppressed, but if ignored, will become the revolutionaries of tomorrow.
- An improved interface, with more information easily available and improving gameplay.
- China is now divided into cliques, known as substates, allowing for more interaction in the Far East.

=== Heart of Darkness ===
Victoria II: Heart of Darkness
- Developer: Paradox Development Studio
- Publisher: Paradox Interactive
- Engine: Clausewitz Engine
- Platform: Microsoft Windows
- Release: WW: April 16, 2013
- Genres: Single-player, multiplayer
- Mode: Single-player

The Victoria II: Heart of Darkness expansion was released on April 16, 2013. It includes the following features:

- A brand new colonization system;
- A new naval combat system;
- Significant changes to land combat (particularly forts, recon/siege);
- A number of top-level interface upgrades including many new map modes;
- Introduction of international crises and many events, allowing smaller nations to achieve their aims with the aid of Great Powers;
- Introduction of newspapers which provide information about events around the world; and
- Several tweaks to industrial production.

=== Other DLC ===
A selection of smaller DLC has been made available for purchase for Victoria II. These have little to no effect on gameplay but alter the game's appearance or music, and are significantly less expensive than their larger counterparts.

==== Music packs ====
- Victoria II: Songs of the Civil War

Special pre-order content:

- Victoria II: Lament For The Queen

==== Cosmetic packs ====
- Victoria II: A House Divided – American Civil War Spritepack
- Victoria II: German Unit Pack
- Victoria II: Interwar Engineer Unit Pack
- Victoria II: Interwar Cavalry Unit Pack
- Victoria II: Interwar Spritepack
- Victoria II: Interwar Artillery Spritepack
- Victoria II: Planes Spritepack

== Reception ==
Reception

Aggregate score
Aggregator	Score
Metacritic	75/100; 76/100 (A House Divided); 81/100 (Heart of Darkness)

Review scores
Publication	Score
Destructoid	8.5/10 (Heart of Darkness)
GameSpot	7.5/10
PC Gamer (US)	76/100
GameShark	B−

Victoria II received generally favourable reviews, achieving a 75% average on Metacritic.

GameSpot said that there was much less micromanagement than in its predecessor. The reviewer stated: "Thanks to a friendlier interface and tutorials, Victoria II is a lot more playable and enjoyable than its predecessor."

GameShark was less enthusiastic. The reviewer said: "As a strategy game, Victoria II frustrates me. It is an orgy of detail for detail's sake, yet the information I really want never seems to be at hand. The decisions I make seem mostly inconsequential, changing the game only by a slow process of accretion. Modeling has overtaken game design. Watching Victoria II is hypnotic and frequently awe-inspiring. Unfortunately, you only occasionally might want to play it."

In a review of Victoria II in Black Gate, E. E. Knight said "While seeking an escape from the distressing politics of the early Twenty-First Century, I decided to plunge headlong into the distressing politics of the Nineteenth Century and picked up a game I've long been meaning to try: Victoria II. It was a good call. This civ-building game is quite an achievement."

The release of A House Divided drew increased praise and averaged 76% on Metacritic, and Heart of Darkness further increased positive reviews, averaging 81%.

== Sequel ==
In an Ask Me Anything thread on Reddit in October 2013, PDS manager Johan Andersson stated that they would consider making a sequel to Victoria II, but that this would likely come after Hearts of Iron IV.

In December 2015, a beta patch was made for Victoria II, long after it was assumed that no further patches would be released. This prompted speculation that there could be refreshed interest in the Victoria series, although in a Reddit thread these rumours were played down by Paradox developers.

During an interview for the company's Paradox Podcast in February 2018, CEO Fredrik Wester mentioned "I'm not a firm believer that Victoria II is the most prioritised game to make a sequel out of", that he won't be the one making the decision either and that it would come "before 2025".

At PDXCON 2021, Victoria 3 was announced.

Victoria 3 was released on 25 October 2022.

== See also ==
- List of grand strategy video games
- List of Paradox Interactive games
- List of PC games
