= Stellaris (video game) =

2016 video game

- Developer: Paradox Development Studio
- Publisher: Paradox Interactive
- Directors: Henrik Fåhraeus; Martin "Wiz" Anward (Post-release); Daniel "grekulf" Moregård (Post-release); Stephen "Eladrin" Muray (Post-release, current)
- Producers: Rikard "Åslund" Jansson; Anna Norrevik
- Designers: Henrik Fåhraeus; Joakim Andreasson; Daniel Moregård; Johan Andersson
- Artist: Fredrik Toll
- Composers: Andreas Waldetoft; Bert Meyer
- Engine: Clausewitz Engine
- Platforms: Linux; macOS; Microsoft Windows; PlayStation 4; Xbox One
- Release: Windows, OS X, Linux; May 9, 2016; PlayStation 4, Xbox One; February 26, 2019
- Genres: 4X, Grand strategy
- Modes: Single-player, Multiplayer

Stellaris is a 4X grand strategy video game developed by Paradox Development Studio and published by Paradox Interactive. Players take control of an interstellar civilization on the galactic stage and are tasked with exploring, colonising, and managing their region of the galaxy, encountering other civilizations that they can then engage in diplomacy, trade, or warfare with. A large part of the game involves dealing with both scripted and emergent events, through which the player might gain useful bonuses and profits, or vice versa, lose their power and strengthen rival civilizations. It was released worldwide for Windows, macOS, and Linux on May 9, 2016, and for PlayStation 4 and Xbox One as Stellaris: Console Edition on February 26, 2019.

== Gameplay ==
The screenshot of the in-game map without the user interface

Stellaris is a real-time strategy game with 4X and grand strategy elements, taking place on a map of a procedurally generated galaxy with individual star systems acting as two-dimensional tiles. Each star has its own star class (like B, A or F) and own planets of different sizes and types (for example gas giants or rocky planets of very high or low surface temperatures) orbiting around, that can be divided into habitable and not habitable ones; all planets have certain resources on them and can be exploited by the stellar empire that owns the system. Star systems can only be traversed via a web of faster-than-light routes called hyperlanes.

Players take the role of a single civilisation, capable of FTL travel, referred to as an empire, with the goal of exploring and claiming systems, colonising habitable planets, and expanding their economy to outcompete rival civilisations, encountered through events of first contact. The relative power of empires is evaluated on three factors – military strength, technological progress and economic power – allowing players to either specialise in a single area or maintain a balanced approach. Military strength is influenced by the strength of the starship fleet an empire possesses, and can be used to engage in wars against other empires. Technological progress is defined by the amount and rarity of technologies an empire has researched, with each technology providing some minor bonuses or unlocking unique major changes. Economic power depends on the amount of resources an empire produces, that can be used to trade with other civilisations or improve the quality of life of the population.

The empire that collects the largest amount of in-game score, that depends on its power, political influence and several other factors, wins the game when it reaches its end date. Habitable planets hold populations of an empire's citizens, where each citizen is assigned a certain job, representing a working, specialist or elite class, with each job consuming and producing some in-game resources. Jobs are provided by buildings existing on the planet, where each building also gives certain bonuses by itself and is bound to a certain type of 'district' like city district, industrial district, energy district or agricultural district.

A large part of main gameplay of Stellaris is determined by the design of the player's empire, which affects both visual look and in-game mechanics. The player is offered to either select from developer-made pre-set empires or create their own; each empire has a set of unique traits like origin, representing the pre-FTL history of their civilisation, ethics, representing the core philosophy of their empire, civics, representing the internal structure of their government and society, or head of state together with the type of government (like authoritarian, democratic or fictional "Hive mind" or "Megacorporation" types). Ethics are chosen from a total of eight options along four mutually exclusive axes, (Note: Spiritualist versus Materialist, Militarist versus Pacifist, Xenophobe versus Xenophile, and Egalitarian versus Authoritarian) allowing the player to also choose between fanatical and moderate variants of each.

Players also control leaders - in-game characters that can occupy a certain position or role, like managing research operations, governing a colony or commanding a starship fleet. Each leader has their own unique traits that provide additional positive or negative effects and can be upgraded, as the leader gains experience by working in their relevant field (military, economy or science).

The game begins on January 1, 2200 AD, upon the player empire's discovery of the hyperlane network. The default campaign length is 300 in-game years, divided into 100-year early-game, mid-game, and end-game segments dictating certain events and modifiers. The economy of a player's empire throughout the game is primarily based on six main resources: energy credits, minerals, food, consumer goods, alloys and trade, each having a primary purpose to contribute to the player's economy. There are also Strategic resources that are used to make advanced buildings, weapons, defences or endorsing edicts, that provide certain profit to the player. Unity, which can be obtained by supporting factions within the empire or by constructing buildings that produce it, is used to create and maintain edicts and unlock traditions; traditions are a series of bonuses, linked to a certain theme like espionage, exploration, mercantilism or militarism. Advancement in Stellaris is achieved through technologies and traditions which progressively scale in cost for the player to achieve, but provide better features for the player as the game continues.

After a certain period of time, 'Galactic Crises' can occur, whose goal is to make the later game more difficult for the player. Crises are divided into mid-game and late-game ones. Mid game crisis can include events such as crusades by a marauder empire or swarms of hostile voidworms that plague the galaxy. Late-game crises might include an awakening of hostile dormant sentient AI or an invasion by extra-dimensional or extra-galactic forces, these being either randomly chosen or selected by the player at the start of the game. Paradox hoped that this feature would address a common late-game problem in 4X style games; whereby one faction is so powerful that their eventual victory is inevitable, resulting in frustrating gameplay. Subsequent expansions have added multiple ways for player empires to become a crisis faction themselves by researching dangerous technologies that imperil the entire galaxy: harvesting stars for energy, attempting to rewrite the laws of physics, genetically engineering dangerous space creatures, or destroying the entire galaxy by turning every star into a black hole. These options provide the player with an alternative method to win the game should they be skilled enough to complete the crisis objective while often facing off against the rest of the galaxy.

Later in the game, the player is offered to choose between several "ascension paths", which radically alter the inhabitants of a player's empire. These include advanced genetic engineering, cybernetic augmentation, psionic powers, or uploading the minds of your species into a machine body. Machine empires, who already started as such, choose between different ascensions like advanced nanotechnology or transportation of the civilisation into a virtual simulation.

== Development and release ==
Stellaris was developed by PDS Green of Paradox Development Studios and published by Paradox Interactive. The game uses the same Clausewitz Engine that the studio has used since Europa Universalis III in 2007 albeit with some modifications, such as the usage of physically based rendering (PBR). The game was presented at Gamescom in August 2015. Director Henrik Fahraeus describes his influences as "one third Star Control 2, one third Master of Orion 2 and one third Europa Universalis IV", to "create a strategy game with particular focus on exploration and expansion". The team also referenced Star Control II with several character concepts and personalities, including alien races who resemble birds, mushrooms, and gas clouds.

Stellaris was released to the public on May 9, 2016. After launch, the developers confirmed that there would be a number of expansion packs, as well as free updates to address bugs and introduce new gameplay features. The updates were named after famous science fiction writers, including Stanisław Lem, Arthur C. Clarke, Isaac Asimov, Robert A. Heinlein, Iain Banks, Douglas Adams, Ray Bradbury, Karel Čapek, Pierre Boulle, C. J. Cherryh, Larry Niven, Ursula K. Le Guin, Gene Wolfe, Tanith Lee, and Mary Shelley, until 2022, when they began to take the names of constellations starting with 3.3, "Libra".

The game is accompanied by free patches, which may adjust existing mechanics or add new ones in the same theme as the expansions. The first major patch arrived on May 24, shortly after the game's release, featuring numerous improvements to the AI, as well as an additional playable race. The 2.0 patch (Cherryh), released in February 2018, revamps a significant amount of game mechanics, even for players who have not purchased the corresponding "Apocalypse" DLC. The 2.1 (Niven) update, released alongside the "Distant Stars" DLC in May, revamped the base game play loop and added more quality-of-life features. The 2.2 (Le Guin) update was released in December, along with the "Megacorp" DLC, and revamped how planets are organized. The 3.0 (Dick) update was released in April 2021, coinciding with the release of the "Nemesis" DLC. Minor releases have continued through 2022 with 3.5 being released September 2022.

There have been plenty of story packs and species packs that have been released, each adding a new in game events, origins, empire types, species, traits, civic, and ascension perks. Plantoids Species Pack dropped August 4, 2016 being the first, and the latest being Astral Planes, released November 16, 2023.

Paradox ported the game to consoles. The PlayStation 4 and Xbox One versions of Stellaris were released on February 26, 2019, as Stellaris: Console Edition. A version of the game optimized for Xbox Series X/S released on March 25, 2021.

=== Expansions and DLCs ===
DLC timeline
2016	Plantoids
2016	Leviathans
2017	Utopia
2017	Synthetic Dawn
2017	Humanoids
2018	Apocalypse
2018	Distant Stars
2018	MegaCorp
2019	Ancient Relics
2019	Lithoids
2020	Federations
2020	Necroids
2021	Nemesis
2021	Aquatics
2022	Overlord
2022	Toxoids
2023	First Contact
2023	Galactic Paragons
2023	Astral Planes
2024	The Machine Age
2024	Cosmic Storms
2024	Grand Archive
2025	BioGenesis
2025	Shadows of the Shroud
2025	Infernals
2026	Nomads
2026	Willpower

A number of DLCs have been released for the game. All are optional and may be applied to the base game in any combination. The largest DLCs come in the form of expansions, which significantly alter the mechanics and features of the game. There are also story packs (which add new events and minor mechanics) and species packs (which add new species, with accompanying audio, visuals and mechanics).

Name	Type	Release date	Description
Plantoids	Species Pack	4 August 2016	Introduces new plant-based species for players and AI empires to choose from, including new artwork and animations for leaders, ships, and cityscapes. As of version 3.1, the pack also includes additional species traits and civics available for plantoid and fungoid empires.
Leviathans	Story Pack	20 October 2016	Introduces "Leviathans", powerful space creatures and entities which can be fought or investigated; independent enclaves; and new mechanics for Fallen Empires to awaken and either reconquer the Galaxy or fight one another in the "War in Heaven".
Utopia	Expansion	6 April 2017	Adds megastructures including Ringworlds and Dyson spheres, space habitats, "Ascension Perks" allowing biological, synthetic, or psionic evolution, hive mind empires, as well as new slavery and native indoctrination options.
Synthetic Dawn	Story Pack	21 September 2017	Allows playing as (and against) non-organic empires and features the ability to play as and encounter machine empires with unique event chains and mechanics while also adding synthetic uprisings and new synthetic portraits.
Humanoids	Species Pack	7 December 2017	Adds new options for human-like player and AI empires, with new leader and ship appearance options, and additional music tracks and VIR voiceover sets. As of version 3.1, the pack also includes two new civics and the clone army origin.
Apocalypse	Expansion	22 February 2018	Focusing on warfare, this expansion adds several super weapons providing for the ability to destroy planets and eradicate or assimilate planetary populations, in addition to new "Titan" ship classes and defensive modules allowing for system-wide weapon attacks. Also includes nomadic "Marauder" civilizations, unity ambitions, and new civics.
Distant Stars	Story Pack	22 May 2018	Introduces the ability to discover and unlock access to new hidden star clusters and encounter several new anomalies, events, space entities, and unique systems. Also adds a fictional "L-Cluster", a section of stars that spawned with regular galaxies.
MegaCorp	Expansion	6 December 2018	Introduces new Corporate Authorities which can establish branch offices on foreign planets and dominate galactic trade. Also adds the ability to create an ecumenopolis, non-player nomadic "Caravaneer" civilizations, more megastructures, new ascension perks, and a galactic slave market.
Ancient Relics	Story Pack	4 June 2019	Allows the player to uncover the ruins of long-dead civilizations, discover their histories and reinvent their ancient technologies.
Lithoids	Species Pack	24 October 2019	Adds new rock-based species for players and AI, with unique mechanics, portraits and voices.
Federations	Expansion	17 March 2020	Adds five new federation types, additional resolutions for the Galactic Community, new Origins for player empires, new mega-structures, and the Juggernaut, a new ship class.
Necroids	Species Pack	29 October 2020	Adds necroids, an intelligent undead species, and the ability to form empires with them as the primary species.
Nemesis	Expansion	15 April 2021	Introduces fog of war and expands the espionage/intelligence system. Allows players to become the crisis, with a crisis perk and new ships like Menacing Corvette, Asteroid Cruiser, Star-Eater and more. The expansion also brought many changes to the economy and planet districts.
Aquatics	Species Pack	22 November 2021	Adds new ocean-themed species portraits to choose from, including an optional aquatic species trait. Also includes a ship set, two new origins, the anglers civic, and an advisor voice.
Overlord	Expansion	12 May 2022	Focusing on subject-ruler interactions, this expansion introduces new ways to control your vassals as well as new diplomatic options and civics to choose from.
Toxoids	Species Pack	20 September 2022	Adds new toxic-themed species portraits to choose from, with accompanying traits, and adds civics centered around the poison and toxic theme. It also adds a new toxoid ship set, advisor, and cityscape.
First Contact	Story Pack	14 March 2023	Adds new origins and pre-FTL mechanics along with cloaking technology.
Galactic Paragons	Expansion	9 May 2023	Introduces a Council mechanic and adds new leaders, civics, tradition trees, and agendas.
Astral Planes	Narrative Expansion	16 November 2023	Introduces Astral Rifts with widely branching storylines, which are explorable tears in reality that can only be accessed after researching a certain technology. This also has a chance to create a "Crystal Rift" within the player's home system, which leads to a star in the center of the galaxy with a large astral scar replacing the star, a new relic (if paired with Ancient Relics), a new paragon (if paired with Galactic Paragons) and a large colonizable world known as "azilash".
The Machine Age	Expansion	7 May 2024	Introduces mechanics for individualistic non-gestalt machine empires and adds new reactive portraits, origins, civics, greatly expanded machine and cybernetic ascension paths, two new ship appearance sets and two new megastructures. The DLC also adds a fourth end-game crisis as well as a playable crisis that allows players to bend the rules of reality itself.
Cosmic Storms	Mechanical Expansion	10 September 2024	Introduces cosmic storms and adds a new storm-chasing origin, two new civics, and two precursor narratives.
Grand Archive	Story Pack	29 October 2024	Introduces new origins and civics, as well as the eponymous museum megastructure that plays host to a collection of xeno-geological artifacts, relics from forgotten civilizations, and allows you to tame space fauna as collectibles which can be culled for food or minerals, or clone them via a special technology to expand the player's navy.
BioGenesis	Expansion	5 May 2025	The expansion focuses on biological organisms, and introduces new origins, civics, traits, events, and music. It also adds various bioengineering features, such as cloning, genetic mutation and genetic purity.
Shadows of the Shroud	Mechanical Expansion	22 September 2025	This DLC overhauls the Psionic Ascension Path, introducing new Origins, Civics, events, and gameplay mechanics for interacting with the Shroud. Key features include an enhanced Psionic Ascension Situation, new Shroud Patrons and Covenants, and an overhauled End of the Cycle event.
Infernals	Species Pack	25 November 2025	Adds content centered on fire based organisms. It introduces new origins, civics, a new planet type, and a new crisis path.
Nomads	Expansion	15 June 2026	Introduces Nomadic Empires, a type of empire with new mechanics that doesn't claim star systems and instead uses Arkships as its colonies. It also adds new civics, traditions, origins, a new nomadic enclave, "The Stellar Cannon" megastructure and the "Defender of the Galaxy" ambition.
Willpower	Expansion	23 November 2026	Introduces ideologies and mechanics based around managing ideologies. It adds ideological diplomacy, galactic halls, new ambitions, civics, origins and ship sets.

== Reception ==
=== Pre-release ===
In a preview of the game at Rock, Paper, Shotgun, Adam Smith wrote that Stellaris "could be Paradox's finest hour, and a landmark in the development of both 4X and grand strategy design".

=== Critical response ===
Reception

Aggregate score
Aggregator	Score
Metacritic	(PC) 78/100 (PS4) 77/100 (XONE) 81/100

Review scores
Publication	Score
Destructoid	9/10
Eurogamer	Recommended
Game Informer	8.25/10
GameSpot	7/10
IGN	6.3/10
PC Gamer (US)	70/100
PCGamesN	9/10
Polygon	7.5/10

Stellaris received "generally favorable" reviews, according to review aggregator website Metacritic. A number of reviews emphasized the game's approachable interface and design, along with a highly immersive and almost RPG-like early game heavily influenced by the player's species design decisions, and also the novelty of the end-game crisis events. The more mixed reviews also noted that the mid-game could be less satisfying, thanks to an overly simple diplomatic system and a somewhat passive AI.

=== Sales ===
Less than 24 hours after release, Paradox Interactive announced that Stellaris had sold over 200,000 units, breaking the revenue record for any of Paradox Interactive's previous titles during the same time period. It almost matched the sales record currently held by Cities: Skylines. It became Paradox Development Studio's fastest selling game. On 21 June 2016, the game had sold over 500,000 units. On 12 May 2020, the publisher announced a new record for total players online, with the game's sales exceeding 3 million units.

== Spin-offs ==
In June 2023, a spin-off titled Stellaris: Nexus was announced. It is developed by Whatboy Games. During the early access period, the game dropped the Stellaris name and was retitled to Nexus 5X. The game is still set in the Stellaris universe.

Star Trek: Infinite was released on October 12, 2023 by Paradox. It was described as extremely similar to Stellaris.

== See also ==
- List of grand strategy video games
- List of Paradox Interactive games
- List of PC games
