= For the Glory =

2009 video game

- Developer: Crystal Empire Games
- Publisher: Paradox Interactive
- Engine: Europa Engine
- Platform: Microsoft Windows
- Release: November 10/11, 2009
- Genres: Real-time Grand strategy
- Modes: Single-player, multiplayer

For the Glory is a grand strategy wargame that is based on Europa Universalis II and Paradox's Europa Engine. It was developed by Crystal Empire Games, a studio composed of members of the Europa Universalis II modification "Alternative Grand Campaign / Event Exchange Project" (AGCEEP) team, and published by Paradox Interactive. It was announced on September 4, 2009 and was released November 10/11, 2009. The game is available for Windows.

In For the Glory, the player chooses from over 400 nations spanning the 1000 province globe to guide a single nation from 1399 to 1837, managing its economy, military, political alliances, scientific development, exploration and colonization, religious affairs, and internal stability. It features over 10,000 historically accurate events and rulers.

The game's reviews praised its immersive experience in the history of the period, its improved graphics, and its enhanced interfaces (when compared to its Europa Universalis II start point). However, some reviews described multiplayer stability issues, laborious management, and irritating sound effects.

== Gameplay ==
A preview image of For the Glory showing the map, interfaces, menus, units and Western Europe.

For the Glory is played in real time, which flows continuously during gameplay, rather than taking place in turns. The player is able to pause the game, speed up, or slow down time as desired. Unlike most real-time strategy games, the focus is not on military management. Instead, as with other grand strategy titles, the player manages their chosen nation juggling the nation's economy, military, political alliances, scientific development, exploration and colonization, religious affairs, and internal stability.

A major aspect of For the Glory is managing domestic policies. Every ten in-game years, and through events, the player can use sliders to determine domestic policies, which impact the game. Balancing the nation's budget and keeping a lid on inflation are other primary objectives. Money is used for purposes including funding the military, trade, and research. The player can invest funds in their country's stability as well, and stability affects just about every aspect of a nation's performance. Instability is usually the result of in-game actions, such as declaring war on a neighboring country without a casus belli, and it can also be influenced by events. Low stability means land and naval forces stand a greater chance of losing battles, the frequency of internal rebellions rises, diplomatic actions are less successful, and the founding and expansion of colonies are more likely to fail.

Foreign policy and interaction with computer-controlled nations is another sizable facet in For the Glory. AI nations work to maintain the balance of power. If a player tries to conquer territory quickly, their international reputation will tarnish, and AI nations become more likely to form alliances against the player. Besides brute force there are other methods to nation-building. Through diplomacy, it is possible to vassalize or annex other countries. Aggressive actions still negatively impact the country's reputation, but less than taking territory by force. Also, a casus belli makes the war seem less threatening, reducing the impact on reputation. Casus belli can come through events or religious differences, but the player can also use diplomacy to create one. The player can influence their neighbors as well, with the effectiveness of diplomatic actions determined by the ruler's diplomacy skill.

Battles take place in real time, but the player does not have significant control over them. Conflicts between armies are resolved and if the invader wins they besiege the province's garrison. Once the player starves out the garrison, the player controls the province. However, occupation does not equal ownership in For the Glory. Instead, the enemy must agree to cede the territory in a peace treaty, and the likelihood that they will agree to terms is determined by how much territory the player controls and how well their units fared in battle.

== Development ==
For the Glory was created by Crystal Empire Games, a development studio created in June 2008 after the announcement of the Europa Engine Licensing Program by Paradox Interactive. Many Crystal Empire Games team members were active in the Paradox Interactive community for years, contributing mods and tools dedicated to the company's games. As a result, For the Glory is modification friendly.

For the Glory features thousands of new events, both random and historical, the majority of which are country-specific. This is the result of years of intense research, design and post-playtest development from the collegial "AGCEEP" (Alternative Grand Campaign - Event Exchange Program) modification team from the Europa Universalis II fora. The interface, graphics, and tool tips were changed when compared to its Europa Universalis II starting point. The number of resolutions supported was increased as well. A number of new For the Glory features now impact performance in battle, including terrain and weather. These elements now also impact losses from attrition. Weather still affects naval attrition, but the player's fleets now automatically sail to the nearest friendly port when in danger of sinking. The AI now concentrates its forces, making combat against nonplayer nations more difficult.

As of the 1.3 patch, the game features over 400 playable nations, various new cultures and religions, an expanded dynamic Rebels system, a new Decisions system, a new Holy Roman Empire window, and many additional gameplay and UI improvements.

In addition to a revamped version of the original Grand Campaign (and an optional 'Vinlandsaga' setting), For the Glory now includes the following playable scenarios:

- 1399 - The Age of Timur
- 1453 - The Age of Renaissance
- 1492 - The Age of Exploration
- 1546 - The Age of Reformation
- 1617 - The Age of Mercantilism
- 1701 - The Age of Enlightenment
- 1773 - The Age of Revolutions
- 1795 - Napoleon's Ambition
- 1816 - The Age of Imperialism
- Fantasia
- Fantasia Imperium
- Fantasia Expanded

== Reception ==
For the Glory

Aggregate score
Aggregator	Score
GameRankings	76.67%

Review scores
Publication	Score
GameSpot	7.5/10
GamesRadar+	6/10
PC Gamer (UK)	65/100
Gamer Daily News	6/10
LEVEL	70/100
Armchair General	85/100
Resolution Magazine	6/10
Play This Thing!	Buy
Game Vortex	90/100

For the Glory received mixed reviews. Reviewers highlighted its historical immersion, improved graphics and interfaces, and plethora of historical events as major draws for fans of the series. Conversely, they cited the crash-prone multiplayer, some tedious management aspects, and annoying sound effects as drawbacks. It was called, "an improvement from EU II..." and "...more than a mega-patch but less than a new game...".

Despite the supremely disappointing multiplayer experience, For the Glory manages to greatly improve upon Europa Universalis II. The visual improvements, better tooltips, helpful reminder icons, and thousands of new events make For the Glory superior to its venerable ancestor. Needless to say, fans of EUII should pick it up immediately, and Renaissance- and Napoleonic-era aficionados are in for a treat. However, given the availability of Europa Universalis III and its expansions, you may prefer to skip For the Glory in favor of the more stable and aesthetically pleasing experience. If you love the flavor of historical and alt-history events, For the Glory is the Europa Universalis may well be the game for you.

— Daniel Shannon, For the Glory Review, Gamespot
