= Victoria: An Empire Under the Sun =

2003 video game

- Developer: Paradox Entertainment (Note: Mac version developed and published by Virtual Programming.)
- Publishers: SWE: PAN Vision; NA: Strategy First; UK: Koch Media
- Producer: Johan Andersson
- Designer: Joakim Bergqwist
- Programmer: Johan Andersson
- Artist: Dick Sjöström
- Engine: Europa Engine
- Platforms: Microsoft Windows, Mac OS X
- Release: Microsoft Windows: SWE: November 2003; NA: November 24, 2003; UK: March 26, 2004; Mac OS X July 7, 2004
- Genres: Grand strategy
- Mode: Single player

Victoria: An Empire Under the Sun is a grand strategy video game by Paradox Entertainment (now known as Paradox Interactive), released in 2003. It covers primarily its namesake the Victorian period (1837–1901) and beyond, specifically 1836–1920 for the main game, and extends until 1936 if the expansion is installed. The game runs on a modified version of the Europa Engine, and the lead game programmer was Johan Andersson. It was later ported to Macintosh by Virtual Programming.

Unlike previous Paradox Games, which either focused on diplomacy or war, Victoria focuses on internal management, covering the industrialization and social/political changes in a country. The game emphasizes the economy of a country and a complex market system. Victoria was well received by players, but received largely indifferent reviews on release, averaging only 60.4% on GameRankings. Critics cited reasons such as the game's steep learning curve and its relatively dated graphics. A sequel, Victoria II, was released in August 2010, and another sequel, Victoria 3, was released in October 2022.

== Gameplay ==
The economic system in Victoria attempts to simulate the flow of resources in a world market. Every province in the game produces a resource. Some resources, such as wheat, are demanded principally by POPs (population units), and can be sold directly. Other materials, such as timber, are consumed mostly by industry - but can nonetheless be sold directly for less profit. The player possesses a wide range of options with which to build their economy, provided they have access to the proper raw materials. All resources can be collected or produced by industry. They can also be acquired on the world market. Access to the world market is granted based on a country's prestige rating.

Victoria has 47 separate resources, produced by collection or production (or in one case both). The game focuses on industrialization in a country, which is driven by technological research. The acquisition of machine parts is crucial to industrialization, as they are needed to build factories.

Diplomacy is managed bilaterally; nations can engage in diplomacy using a variable yearly supply of diplomats, offering various treaties and entreaties to other states. Players can use money to improve relations with the other powers; offer to negotiate for technology, territory, colonial claims, and money; sign pacts of unilateral or mutual defense or full alliances; demand the cessation of colonization of certain areas; and, if all other efforts fail, declare war.

Warfare in Victoria is a special circumstance of diplomacy wherein two players attempt to invade one another's (national or colonial, depending on the war) territory. It is abstract, and consists of divisions marching to hostile territory and fighting a hands-off battle that the player has no control over save by sending reinforcements or withdrawing. Combat efficiency, however, can be influenced decisively by the player. Appointing generals or admirals influences the morale and organization of the troops, as do technological improvements. An advanced railroad system in a province grants the province's owner bonuses in combat, as well as increased mobility. Provinces can also be fortified and troops will entrench when left alone long enough, both giving enormous combat benefits.

The ultimate objectives in warfare is dramatically different from those of other strategy games: it is generally very difficult to do severe damage to an enemy's economy in a single war, occupied territory is only temporarily in the hands of the occupier, and post-war territorial gains are generally modest and difficult to subdue. However, there are other conditions to peace such as War Indemnities and Humiliation.

Declaring war or seizing provinces from civilized countries without pre-existing claims makes diplomacy more difficult and can eventually lead to preemptive war from other powers. Warmongers tend to discover themselves radically isolated from the rest of the world and forced to engage in warfare almost continuously, which can lead to neglect of industry and prestige.

Military units in Victoria are divided into two types: land and naval. Land units fight against enemy land units, and can occupy enemy provinces. They are the key to military supremacy. Naval units provide a more supportive role; bombarding enemy land units and fighting sea battles. Some naval units can also transport land units.

== Reception ==
Reception

Aggregate score
Aggregator	Score
Metacritic	(PC) 58/100

Review scores
Publication	Score
Computer Gaming World	3/5
GameSpot	6.3/10
PC Gamer (US)	62%
Computer Games Magazine	3/5

Victoria got mostly mixed reviews from critics. GameSpot commented on its "wonderful depth" and "great alternate-history ambiance." However, GameSpot also commented that the game was "more work than play," citing its steep learning curve and overall scope of options. IGN commented that the game had unique potential, but was crushed by its "bugginess" and lack of tutorial. Barry Brenesal ended his IGN review, explaining, "There's an excellent game struggling to surface in Victoria, and I look forward to playing it just as soon as the requisite patches appear. Now would some kindly soul please create an accurate, intelligent manual for the game?"

Computer Gaming World found the game more challenging and involved compared to the earlier Europa Universalis games, but echoed the other reviews by saying that the "lack of a tutorial or at least a thicker manual [was] inexcusable." The reviewer then concluded that at the time of the initial release, before patches, players were in essence "paying Paradox to beta test their game."

== Victoria: Revolutions ==
Victoria: Revolutions is the expansion pack for Victoria: An Empire Under the Sun. It was released on August 17, 2006 through GamersGate, and on CD in October 2006.

=== New features ===
- 15 extra years of game play, extending Victoria into the interbellum.
- An expanded tech tree to cover the interwar period, including aircraft and carriers.
- A Doomsday converter which allows players to continue their game in Hearts of Iron II: Doomsday.
- A revamped election and politics system, adding a new level of realism to the game.
- A new ideology, fascism
- An overhauled military system, which will be linked with the player's policy decisions.
- A new economic system that brings more realism through various economic models.

== See also ==
- List of grand strategy video games
- List of Paradox Interactive games
