= List of grand strategy video games =

This is an index of grand strategy video games, sorted chronologically. Information regarding date of release, developer, platform, setting, and notability is provided when available. The table can be sorted by clicking on the small boxes next to the column headings.

== Legend ==
Video game platforms
3DO	3DO	AMI	Amiga	APPII	Apple II
ATR	Atari 8-bit computers	ATRST	Atari ST, Atari Falcon	C64	Commodore 64
DC	Dreamcast	DOS	PC DOS / MS-DOS, Windows 3.X	DROID	Android
FM7	FM-7	FMT	FM Towns	GB	Game Boy
GBC	Game Boy Color	GEN	Genesis / Mega Drive	iOS	iOS, iPhone, iPod, iPadOS, iPad, visionOS, Apple Vision Pro
LIN	Linux, SteamOS	MAC	Classic Mac OS, 2001 and before	MSX	MSX
MSX2	MSX2	NES	Nintendo Entertainment System / Famicom	NS	Nintendo Switch
OSX	macOS	PBEM	Play-by-email	PC88	PC-8800 series
PC98	PC-9800 series	PCD	TurboGrafx-CD / PC Engine CD-ROM²	PCE	TurboGrafx-16 / PC Engine
PET	Commodore PET	PS1	PlayStation 1	PS2	PlayStation 2
PS3	PlayStation 3	PS4	PlayStation 4	PSP	PlayStation Portable
PSV	PlayStation Vita	S32X	32X	SAT	Sega Saturn
SCD	Sega CD / Mega-CD	SNES	Super NES / Super Famicom / Super Comboy	TI99	TI-99/4A
TRS80	TRS-80	Wii	Wii, WiiWare, Wii Virtual Console	WiiU	Wii U, WiiU Virtual Console
WIN	Windows, all versions Windows 95 and up	WS	WonderSwan	X1	Sharp X1
XB	Xbox, Xbox Live Arcade	XB360	Xbox 360, Xbox 360 Live Arcade	XBO	Xbox One
X68K	X68000				

Types of releases
Compilation	A compilation, anthology or collection of several titles, usually (but not always) belonging to the same series
Early access	A game launched in early access is unfinished and thus might contain bugs and glitches or have some of the content missing
Episodic	An episodic video game that is released in batches over a period of time
Expansion	A large-scale DLC to an already existing game that adds new story, areas and additions and/or changes to the game's mechanics
Full release	A full release of a game that launched in early access first
Limited	A special release (often called "Limited" or "Collector's Edition") with bonus collector's material. Often provided to people who pre-order a game
Port	The game first appeared on a different platform and a port was made. The game is like the original, with few or no differences
Remake	The game is an enhanced remake of an original, made using a new engine and/or assets and thus containing completely new sound, graphics and possibly changes to the story and/or gameplay
Remaster	The game is a remaster of an original, released on the same or different platform, with (usually minor) changes to graphics, sound and/or gameplay
Rerelease	The game was re-released on the same platform with no or only minor changes

== List ==
Year	Game	Developer	Setting	Platform	Notes	Ref.
1979	Galaxy	Microcomputer Games	Sci-fi	APPII, ATR, TRS80, PET, C64, DOS, FM7, TI99	First name: Galactic Empires (1979). Aka. Galaxy!. Released through 1979-1983.	
1982	Andromeda Conquest	Microcomputer Games	Sci-fi	APPII, ATR, C64, PET, DOS, TRS80, FM7	Influenced the 4X sub-genre.	
1983	Geopolitique 1990	Strategic Simulations Inc.	Cold War	APPII, C64		
1983	Nobunaga no Yabou	Koei	Sengoku Jidai	GB, GEN, MSX, NES, SNES	First title in the series.	
1983	Reach for the Stars: The Conquest of the Galaxy	Strategic Studies Group	Sci-fi	APPII, C64	First complete 4X title. Had three editions, latest in 1988.	
1984	Computer Diplomacy	Avalon Hill	20th century	DOS, TRS80, AMI, ST	Board game adaptation.	
1985	Colonial Conquest	SSI	Age of Imperialism	APPII, ATR, ATRST, C64		
1985	Romance of the Three Kingdoms	Koei	Three Kingdoms	DOS, FM7, MSX, AMI, NES, PC88, SNES, WS, X1	First title in the series.	
1986	Nobunaga's Ambition	Koei	Sengoku Jidai	PC88, GEN, NES, PS1, PCD, SNES		
1986	Balance of Power	Mindscape	Cold War	MAC, DOS	"1990 Edition" released in 1989.	
1987	Genghis Khan	Koei	Mongol Invasion	PC98, MSX, X68K, DOS, NES, AMI		
1988	Nobunaga's Ambition II	Koei	Sengoku Jidai	PC88, GBC, NES	Sequel to Nobunaga's Ambition.	
1988	Reach for the Stars: The Conquest of the Galaxy - Third Edition	Strategic Studies Group	Sci-fi	DOS, C64, APPII, AMI, MAC, PC98	Third & last edition. Updated to 16-bit computers.	
1989	Romance of the Three Kingdoms II	Koei	Three Kingdoms	DOS, PC88, PC98, MSX2, AMI, NES, SNES, GEN, WS, PS1, WIN	Sequel to Romance of the Three Kingdoms.	
1989	Storm Across Europe	SSI	World War II	C64, AMI, DOS		
1990	Command HQ	Ozark Softscape	Historical	MAC, DOS		
1990	Nobunaga's Ambition: Lord of Darkness	Koei	Sengoku Jidai	GEN, NES, PS1, PCD, SNES		
1991	L'Empereur	Koei	Napoleonic Wars	MSX, DOS, NES, X68K		
1991	World Empire	Viable	Historical	DOS, WIN		
1992	Romance of the Three Kingdoms III: Dragon of Destiny	Koei	Three Kingdoms	DOS, PC98, X68K, FMT, PCE, SNES, GEN, SCD, PS1, WIN	Sequel to Romance of the Three Kingdoms II.	
1992	Genghis Khan II: Clan of the Gray Wolf	Koei	Mongol Invasion	DOS, GEN, PC88, PC98, SNES, X68K	Sequel to Genghis Khan.	
1992	Nobunaga no Yabou: Haouden	Koei	Sengoku Jidai	PC98, 3DO, GEN, PS1, SCD, SNES		
1993	Clash of Steel	SSI	World War II	DOS		
1993	Global Domination	Impressions	Historical	AMI, DOS	Based on the board game, Risk.	
1994	Romance of the Three Kingdoms IV: Wall of Fire	Koei	Three Kingdoms	DOS, PC98, SNES, S32X, PS1, SAT, DC, WIN	Sequel to Romance of the Three Kingdoms III: Dragon of Destiny.	
1994	Nobunaga no Yabou: Tenshoki	Koei	Sengoku Jidai	PC98, PS1, SAT, SNES		
1994	Panzer General	Strategic Simulations	World War II	DOS, 3DO, MAC, PS1, WIN	First title in the series.	
1995	Age of Discovery	Email Games	Historical	PBEM, WIN	Alternate version of Global Diplomacy with randomized maps.	
1995	Global Diplomacy	Email Games	Historical	PBEM, WIN		
1995	Nobunaga no Yabou: Returns	Koei	Sengoku Jidai	PS1, SAT		
1996	Risk: The Game of Global Domination	BlueSky Software, NMS Software	Historical	PC, PS1	Board game conversion.	
1997	Imperialism	Frog City	Historical	MAC, WIN		
1997	Panzer General II	Strategic Simulations	World War II	WIN		
1997	Romance of the Three Kingdoms V	Koei	Three Kingdoms	DOS, PS1, PSP	Sequel to Romance of the Three Kingdoms IV: Wall of Fire.	
1997	Nobunaga no Yabou: Shouseiroku	Koei	Sengoku Jidai	WIN, DC, PS1, SAT		
1997	Svea Rike	Target Games	History of Sweden	WIN, MAC	First title in the series.	
1998	Axis & Allies	Meyer/Glass	Historical	WIN		
1998	Star Wars: Rebellion	Coolhand Interactive	Science fiction	WIN		
1998	Romance of the Three Kingdoms VI: Awakening of the Dragon	Koei	Three Kingdoms	WIN, PS1, PSP	Sequel to Romance of the Three Kingdoms V.	
1999	Nobunaga no Yabou: Reppuuden	Koei	Sengoku Jidai	WIN, DC, PS1		
1999	Svea Rike II	Target Games	Historical	WIN	Sequel to Svea Rike.	
1999	Imperialism II: Age of Exploration	Frog City	Historical	MAC, WIN	Sequel to Imperialism.	
2000	Europa Universalis	Paradox	Historical	WIN	First title in the series.	
2000	Europa Universalis: Crown of the North aka Svea Rike III	Paradox	Historical	WIN	Sequel to Svea Rike II.	
2000	Reach for the Stars (2000)	Strategic Studies Group	Sci-fi	WIN	Remake of 1988 DOS version with weird visuals.	
2000	Risk II	Deep Red	Historical	WIN, MAC	Sequel to Risk (1996).	
2000	Romance of the Three Kingdoms VII	Koei	Three Kingdoms	WIN, MAC, PSP, PS1, PS2	Sequel to Romance of the Three Kingdoms VI: Awakening of the Dragon.	
2000	Shogun: Total War	The Creative Assembly	Historical	WIN	First title in the series.	
2001	Europa Universalis II	Paradox	Historical	WIN	Sequel to Europa Universalis.	
2001	Romance of the Three Kingdoms VIII	Koei	Three Kingdoms	WIN, MAC, PSP, PS2	Sequel to Romance of the Three Kingdoms VII.	
2001	Nobunaga no Yabou: Ranseiki	Koei	Sengoku Jidai	WIN, XB		
2002	Hearts of Iron	Paradox	World War II	WIN, OSX	First title in the series.	
2002	Strategic Command: European Theater	Fury Software	World War II	WIN	First title in the series.	
2002	Nobunaga no Yabou: Soutensoku	Koei	Sengoku Jidai	WIN		
2002	Medieval: Total War	Creative Assembly	Middle Ages	WIN		
2002	SuperPower	GolemLabs	Modern history	WIN	First title in the series.	
2003	Rise of Nations	Big Huge Games	Historical	WIN, OSX	First title in the series.	
2003	Romance of the Three Kingdoms IX	Koei	Three Kingdoms	WIN, PS2	Sequel to Romance of the Three Kingdoms VIII.	
2003	Nobunaga's Ambition: Rise to Power	Koei	Sengoku Jidai	WIN, PS2		
2003	Victoria: An Empire Under the Sun	Paradox	19th century	WIN, OSX	First title in the series.	
2004	Crusader Kings	Paradox	Middle Ages	WIN	First title in the series.	
2004	Knights of Honor	Black Sea Studios	Medieval	WIN	First title in the series.	
2004	Romance of the Three Kingdoms X	Koei	Three Kingdoms	WIN, PS2	Sequel to Romance of the Three Kingdoms IX.	
2004	Rome: Total War	The Creative Assembly	Historical	WIN, OSX		
2004	SuperPower 2	GolemLabs	Modern	WIN	Sequel to SuperPower.	
2004	Two Thrones	Paradox	Middle Ages	WIN		
2005	Generation of Chaos	Idea Factory	Fantasy	PSP		
2005	Hearts of Iron II	Paradox	World War II	WIN, OSX	Sequel to Hearts of Iron.	
2005	Nobunaga's Ambition: Iron Triangle	Koei	Sengoku Jidai	WIN, PS2, Wii		
2005	Supreme Ruler 2010	BattleGoat Studios	Science fiction	WIN	First title in the series.	
2006	Birth of America	SEP BOA	European colonization of the Americas	WIN		
2006	Strategic Command 2: Blitzkrieg	Fury Software	World War II	WIN	Sequel to Strategic Command: European Theater.	
2006	Romance of the Three Kingdoms XI	Koei	Three Kingdoms	WIN, PS2, Wii	Sequel to Romance of the Three Kingdoms X.	
2006	Medieval II: Total War	The Creative Assembly	Historical	WIN, LIN, OSX		
2007	Ageod's American Civil War	AGEOD	American Civil War	WIN		
2007	Europa Universalis III	Paradox	Historical	WIN	Sequel to Europa Universalis II.	
2007	Making History: The Calm & The Storm	Muzzy Lane	World War II	WIN		
2008	Europa Universalis: Rome	Paradox	Ancient Rome	WIN	Sequel to Europa Universalis III.	
2008	Strategic Command WWII Pacific Theater	Fury Software	World War II	WIN	Sequel to Strategic Command 2: Blitzkrieg.	
2008	Supreme Ruler 2020	BattleGoat Studios	Science fiction	WIN	Sequel to Supreme Ruler 2010.	
2008	TripleA	TripleA team	Historical		Clone of the board game, Axis and Allies.	
2008	World War One	AGEOD	World War I	WIN		
2009	Hearts of Iron III	Paradox	Historical	WIN, OSX	Sequel to Hearts of Iron II.	
2009	For the Glory	Crystal Empire Games	Historical	WIN	Stand-alone game based on Europa Universalis II.	
2009	Arsenal of Democracy	BL-Logic	Historical	WIN	Stand-alone game based on Hearts of Iron II.	
2009	Empire: Total War	The Creative Assembly	Historical	WIN, OSX, LIN		
2009	Nobunaga no Yabou: Tendou	Koei	Sengoku Jidai	WIN, PS3, XB360		
2009	Supremacy 1914	Bytro Labs	World War I	WIN, iOS, DROID		
2009	Reign: Conflict of Nations	Lesta Studio	Renaissance	WIN	Zoomed-in 3D view.	
2010	Distant Worlds	Code Force	Science fiction	WIN		
2010	Making History II: The War of the World	Muzzy Lane	World War II	WIN, OSX	Sequel to Making History: The Calm & The Storm.	
2010	Rise of Prussia	AGEOD	Seven Years' War	WIN		
2010	Victoria II	Paradox	Victorian era	WIN, OSX	Sequel to Victoria: An Empire Under the Sun.	
2010	Napoleon: Total War	The Creative Assembly	Historical	WIN, OSX		
2010	Strategic Command WWII Global Conflict	Fury Software	World War II	WIN	Sequel to Strategic Command WWII Pacific Theater.	
2011	Darkest Hour: A Hearts of Iron Game	Darkest Hour Team	Historical	WIN	Stand-alone game based on Hearts of Iron 2 Armageddon.	
2011	Pride of Nations	AGEOD	19th century	WIN		
2011	Supreme Ruler: Cold War	BattleGoat Studios	Cold War	WIN		
2011	Sengoku	Paradox	Sengoku era	WIN, OSX		
2011	Total War: Shogun 2	The Creative Assembly	Historical	WIN, OSX, LIN		
2011	Storm: Frontline Nation	Colossai Studios	Modern	WIN		
2011	Fate of the World	Red Redemption	Science fiction	WIN, OSX		
2012	Hegemony Gold: Wars of Ancient Greece	Longbow Games	Ancient Greece	WIN		
2012	Romance of the Three Kingdoms XII	Koei	Three Kingdoms	WIN, WiiU, PS3	Sequel to Romance of the Three Kingdoms XI.	
2012	Crusader Kings II	Paradox	Medieval	WIN, OSX, LIN	Sequel to Crusader Kings.	
2013	Ageod's American Civil War II	AGEOD	American Civil War	WIN	Sequel to Ageod's American Civil War.	
2013	Europa Universalis IV	Paradox	Early modern period	WIN, OSX, LIN	Sequel to Europa Universalis III.	
2013	Nobunaga's Ambition: Sphere of Influence	Koei	Sengoku Jidai	WIN, PS3, PS4		
2013	Total War: Rome II	The Creative Assembly	Historical	WIN, OSX, LIN		
2013	March of the Eagles	Paradox	Napoleonic era	WIN, OSX		
2013	Dominions 4: Thrones of Ascension	Illwinter Game Design	Fantasy	WIN, OSX, LIN	Sequel to Dominions 3.	
2014	Hegemony Rome: The Rise of Caesar	Longbow Games	Ancient Rome	WIN	Sequel to Hegemony Gold: Wars of Ancient Greece.	
2014	Making History: The Great War	Muzzy Lane	World War I	WIN, OSX	Sequel to Making History II: The War of the World.	
2014	Supreme Ruler 1936	BattleGoat Studios	Historical	WIN, OSX		
2014	Supreme Ruler Ultimate	BattleGoat Studios	Historical, Science fiction	WIN, OSX		
2015	Call of War	Bytro Labs	World War II	WIN, iOS, DROID		
2015	Total War: Attila	The Creative Assembly	Historical	WIN, OSX, LIN		
2015	Hegemony III: Clash of the Ancients	Longbow Games	Ancient Rome	WIN	Sequel to Hegemony Rome: The Rise of Caesar.	
2016	Romance of the Three Kingdoms XIII	Koei	Three Kingdoms	WIN, PS3, PS4, PSV, XBO, NS	Sequel to Romance of the Three Kingdoms XII.	
2016	Total War: Warhammer	The Creative Assembly	Fantasy	WIN, OSX, LIN		
2016	Conflict of Nations	Bytro Labs, Dorado Games	Cold War, Modern warfare	WIN, iOS, DROID		
2016	Hearts of Iron IV	Paradox	World War II	WIN, OSX, LIN	Sequel to Hearts of Iron III.	
2016	Stellaris	Paradox	Science fiction	WIN, OSX, LIN, PS4, XBO		
2017	Supreme Ruler The Great War	BattleGoat Studios	Historical, Science fiction	WIN, OSX		
2017	Nobunaga's Ambition: Taishi	Koei	Sengoku Jidai	WIN, PS4, NS		
2017	Total War: Warhammer II	The Creative Assembly	Fantasy	WIN, OSX, LIN	Sequel to Total War: Warhammer.	
2018	Total War Saga: Thrones of Britannia	The Creative Assembly	Historical	WIN, OSX, LIN		
2019	Imperator: Rome	Paradox	Ancient Rome	WIN, OSX, LIN	Sequel to Europa Universalis: Rome.	
2019	Total War: Three Kingdoms	The Creative Assembly	Historical	WIN, OSX, LIN		
2019	Field of Glory: Empires	AGEod	Ancient Rome	WIN	Fourth game in the Field of Glory series.	
2020	Crusader Kings III	Paradox	Medieval	WIN, OSX, LIN	Sequel to Crusader Kings II.	
2020	Total War Saga: Troy	The Creative Assembly	Historical	WIN, OSX, LIN		
2021	Iron Order 1919	Bytro Labs	World War I, Dieselpunk	WIN, iOS, DROID	WWI with futuristic technologies.	
2021	Rising Constellation	Blackflag Games	Sci-fi	WIN, OSX, LIN	Multiplayer only. Delisted mid-2023.	
2022	Knights of Honor II: Sovereign	Black Sea Games	Medieval	WIN	Sequel to Knights of Honor.	
2022	Nobunaga's Ambition: Awakening	Koei	Sengoku Jidai	WIN, PS4, NS		
2022	Total War: Warhammer III	The Creative Assembly	Fantasy	WIN, OSX, LIN	Sequel to Total War: Warhammer II.	
2022	Victoria 3	Paradox	Victorian era	WIN, OSX, LIN	Sequel to Victoria II.	
2023	Star Trek: Infinite	Nimble Giant Entertainment	Science fiction	WIN, OSX		
2023 (EA)	World Warfare & Economics	Okron Studio	Modern, Sci-fi	WIN, OSX	Covers whole Earth and up to 66 planets.	
2023	Total War: Pharaoh	The Creative Assembly	Historical	WIN, OSX		
2024	Ara: History Untold	Oxide Games	Alt-Historical	WIN	TBS. Like Humankind.	
2024 (EA)	Rise and Fall: Bronze Age	Ludwig LoreKhan	Historical	WIN	Egypt, Mesopotamia	
2025	Kaiserpunk	Overseer Games	Alt-Historical	WIN	City-builder mix.	
2025	Europa Universalis V	Paradox	Early modern period	WIN	Sequel to Europa Universalis IV.	
2026	AfterWar	Dmytro Lumen	Modern, sci-fi	WIN, DROID	Near-future economics & politics.	
2026	States of Power	Sarunas	World War II	WIN	First title in the series.	
2026	Terra Invicta	Pavonis Interactive	Modern, Sci-fi	WIN	Real-time tactics mix.	

== See also ==
- Grand strategy wargame
