= Europa Universalis III =

2007 grand strategy video game

- Cover art of Europa Universalis III
- Developer: Paradox Development Studio
- Publisher: Paradox Interactive
- Producer: Johan Andersson
- Designer: Johan Andersson
- Programmer: Adam Skoglund
- Artist: Marcus Edström
- Composer: Andreas Waldetoft
- Series: Europa Universalis
- Engine: Clausewitz Engine
- Platforms: Microsoft Windows, Mac OS X
- Release: Windows: NA: 23 January 2007; EU: 26 January 2007; OS X: WW: 2 November 2007
- Genres: Grand strategy
- Modes: Single-player, multiplayer

Europa Universalis III is a grand strategy video game developed by Paradox Development Studio and published by Paradox Interactive. The game was released for Microsoft Windows in January 2007, and was later ported to Mac OS X by Virtual Programming in November 2007.

The player controls a nation and handles matters concerning war, diplomacy, trade, and economy. The game starts in 1453, right after the fall of Constantinople, and continues to 1789, just past the beginning of the French Revolution. The expansion Napoleon's Ambition extends the end game year forward to 1821, whereas the expansion In Nomine moves the starting year back to 1399. Europa Universalis III was the first to use Paradox's new 3D engine, Clausewitz Engine, that required user systems to meet the Pixel Shader 2.0 specification. The map has 1,700 land and sea provinces encompassing most of the world, with 250 playable historical nations.

== Gameplay ==
Players begin the game by choosing what date they would like to start their campaign and which country they would like to play as. Forms of government include various kingdoms, republics, theocracies, and tribal governments. Players can influence a nation's society and values by adjusting "sliders" such as free trade and mercantilism, and may hire court advisors such as Wolfgang Amadeus Mozart. As the game advances, players can pick "national ideas" such as liberté, égalité, fraternité, which give specialized bonuses.

The game has over 300 playable countries, including giants like Ming China, regional powers like Bohemia and Kazan, and smaller nations like the Maldives. There are no formal victory conditions in the game. The world map includes some 1,700 provinces and sea zones. Many provinces in the Americas, Africa, and Oceania are not owned by any country, allowing for colonization.

Economics in the early modern era is simulated by taxes and production income from provinces, as well as trade. National merchants compete in "centers of trade" such as Venice and Lübeck, and nations focused on trading income (e.g., Holland) enjoy significant advantages. Nations which mint too much currency, or are over-reliant on gold mining, are penalized by inflation.

Relations between countries can be impacted by diplomatic actions such as royal marriages, insults, alliances, and trade embargoes. Players are able to gain control over other countries peacefully through personal unions and vassalage. Early international institutions such as the Holy Roman Empire, the Papal Curia, and the Shogunate are simulated in some depth. Every country has its own culture and religion.

Rulers have control over armies, navies, and mercenaries they recruit. Combat is abstract, with no direct control over battles. Military tradition is necessary for recruiting good generals and admirals. Aggression (seizing provinces without a rightful claim) impacts a country's international infamy.

The game is historically detailed; one can play the "grand campaign" starting in 1453 or 1399, but any date before the French Revolution (1821 with the Napoleon's Ambition expansion) is a valid starting point as well, with historical leaders and countries appropriately updated. Major events such as the War of the League of Cambrai are playable this way.

The game may be played single-player or multiplayer, with players controlling different countries; every non-human country is controlled by its own AI.

== Development ==
=== Expansion packs ===
Expansions timeline
2007	Napoleon's Ambition
2008	In Nomine
2009	Heir to the Throne
2010	Divine Wind

Paradox has released four expansion packs for Europa Universalis III; each one requires all the previous expansions. One version of the game, Europa Universalis III Complete, includes the original game and the first two expansions. Another version, Europa Universalis III Chronicles, includes the original game and all four expansions.

==== Napoleon's Ambition ====
An expansion pack named Napoleon's Ambition was released on 22 August 2007 via GamersGate, a digital distribution platform. The Windows version of the expansion is available as a download from GamersGate or as part of the Europa Universalis III Complete retail package, and aims to expand on EUIII with an improved interface, an enhanced trade system, expanded options, and the inclusion of more content to cover the extended time period. Virtual Programming published the Napoleon's Ambition expansion pack for Mac OS X on 7 December the same year.

==== In Nomine ====
A second expansion titled In Nomine was released on 28 May 2008. Features include: a further extension of the game's time frame, the addition of the Byzantine Empire, a revised AI which focuses on strategic top-level goals, and completely reworked rebels with their own goals and abilities. Virtual Programming published the In Nomine expansion for Mac OS X on 18 August. The game now starts earlier, beginning in October 1399 after the coronation of Henry IV of England. Due to the game's time frame having been extended by 54 years, it now includes nations such as the Byzantine Empire and the Jalayirids, leaders like Tamerlane, and events such as the end of the Hundred Years' War.

A key variation of the expansion is the ability for the player to make important decisions that will shape the future of their country. For instance, a player can choose to create the United Kingdom, make Paris "worth a Mass", or institute an East Indian Trade Company. They can now implement decisions on both country and province level with the new decision system, including hundreds of different decisions depending on the situation (for example, the current state religion) and country.

In Nomine also features 'rebels with a cause'. There are several types of rebels (Religious, Patriotic, Peasant...), with different goals and different abilities. For example, if patriotic rebels take control of a province, that province will suffer from 10 more years of nationalism and is more likely to defect. Other rebels include colonial rebels in your colonies determined to get representation or independence and reactionary nobles rising up to put the serfs back in their place. The players can now choose between crushing rebels using military force, negotiating with them, or leaving them and watching them enforce their demands on your country.

Both Napoleon's Ambition and In Nomine are included in Europa Universalis III Complete.

==== Heir to the Throne ====
The third expansion titled Heir to the Throne was released for Windows on 15 December 2009 and includes many features requested by members of the forum. As the title suggests, it is focused mostly on royal family dynamics. Virtual Programming published the Mac OS X expansion on 24 May 2010.

==== Divine Wind ====
In May 2010, a poll was created on the Paradox forums by a developer in which users could vote for a new expansion. Options included expansions to Europa Universalis III, Europa Universalis: Rome, Hearts of Iron III, and Victoria II. With 46% of the votes, the poll was won in favour of a Europa Universalis III expansion which is to focus on the rest of the world. The new expansion is called Divine Wind. It requires Europa Universalis III Complete and the expansion Heir to the Throne in order to play. The expansion pack was released on December 14, 2010.

Divine Wind was published for Mac OS X by Virtual Programming on March 16, 2011.

=== Compilation ===
Released on March 22, 2011, Europa Universalis III: Chronicles bundled all four expansions with the original game. This was the first time Heir to the Throne and Divine Wind became available in retail.

Europa Universalis III: Chronicles was published for Mac OS X by Virtual Programming on September 28, 2011.

== Mods ==
Some popular mods extensively change the game, adding historical flavor, fantasy scenarios, or new game mechanics.

=== Magna Mundi spin-off ===
One of the most popular mods for EU3 was Magna Mundi, which aimed to add detail to the game's map and to steer the course of the alternate history portrayed by the game more towards real-world history by means of scripted events. Because of its popularity, a standalone version of Magna Mundi was planned as a spin-off game, to be developed by the mod's authors, operating as the development studio Universo Virtual, and to be published by Paradox. However, in 2012, MM was cancelled by Paradox, who cited lack of progress as well as a lack of trust in the developers as the reasons for this decision. According to a Paradox spokesman, "members within the MM team [...] report to us that the project lacks active leadership".

Universo Virtual, claiming to have had a game ready for release, announced legal action against Paradox. Its leader, Portuguese developer Carlos Gustavo, accused Paradox of having come up with new requirements several times during development of Magna Mundi. He also claimed that Paradox did not own the source code licensed to him, and announced a release of what was to be Magna Mundi the game, now re-titled World Stage. However, no release date was put and the project's status remained unclear, leading to many to think that the project was finally cancelled.

== Reception ==
Reception

Aggregate score
Aggregator	Score
Metacritic	83/100

Review scores
Publication	Score
Eurogamer	7/10
GameSpot	8.7/10
GamesRadar+	4/5
IGN	8.5/10
VideoGamer.com	7/10
Games for Windows	9/10

Europa Universalis III received an 83% rating on Metacritic, indicating generally positive reviews. In a review for Eurogamer, Alec Meer gave the game a 7 out of 10, stating that it had "near unparalleled flexibility" and that it was "capable of inspiring immense self-satisfaction", while also criticising the game for its obtuse mechanics, especially the ideas system. Nicholas Bale of Game Revolution also gave a positive review, calling it "rich strategic title with a bevy of options available".

== Sequel ==
The game's sequel, Europa Universalis IV, was released on August 13, 2013.

== See also ==
- List of grand strategy video games
- List of Paradox Interactive games
- Computer wargame
