= Imperator: Rome =

2019 Paradox Interactive grand strategy video game

- Developer: Paradox Development Studio
- Publisher: Paradox Interactive
- Director: Johan Andersson
- Producers: Joakim Andreasson; Sam Millen
- Designers: Johan Andersson; Henrik Lohmander; Peter Nicholson
- Artist: Fredrik Toll
- Composer: Jonatan Järpehag
- Engine: Jomini Engine
- Platforms: Windows, macOS, Linux
- Release: 25 April 2019
- Genres: Grand strategy
- Modes: Single-player, multiplayer

Imperator: Rome is a 2019 grand strategy wargame developed by Paradox Development Studio and published by Paradox Interactive. It is a spiritual successor to Europa Universalis: Rome (2008). It received generally positive reviews from critics, however development and support for the game was suspended by May 2021, though occasional patches are still released.

== Gameplay ==
The game is set during classical antiquity, spanning from AUC 450 (304 BCE) to AUC 727 (27 BCE), a period encompassing the Wars of the Diadochi and the rise of the Roman Empire. The map extends from the Iberian Peninsula to India and is divided into territories grouped into provinces. Players take control of a nation, ranging from small tribal states and city-states to major powers, and pursue objectives of their choice, such as territorial conquest, economic development, and diplomatic expansion.

Players govern their nation through the management of its economy, population, and political institutions. The population is represented by Paradox’s "pops" system, divided into five different social classes: nobles, citizens, freemen, tribesmen, and slaves. Each population unit has its own culture and religion, influencing its happiness, productivity, and contribution to the nation's economy and military. Players must manage resources such as gold, manpower, and political influence while developing settlements and cities, constructing infrastructure, establishing trade routes, and maintaining stability throughout their territories.

The game features three primary forms of government: republics, monarchies, and tribal governments, each with distinct political mechanics. Republics must contend with competing political factions, monarchies manage royal families and succession, and tribal governments balance the influence of clan leaders. Characters play an important role in governing the nation, serving as rulers, politicians, governors, and military commanders. Each character possesses individual attributes, traits, and loyalties that affect their effectiveness and political ambitions. Disloyal characters and dissatisfied populations may contribute to internal instability, rebellions, or civil wars.

Diplomacy and warfare are central aspects of the gameplay, allowing players to establish alliances, negotiate with neighboring nations, maintain subject states, and expand their territories through conquest. Military forces consist of levies and professional standing legions raised from the population, in addition to mercenaries and naval fleets. Warfare incorporates factors such as army composition, military tactics, terrain, and the abilities of commanders in determining the success of battles and campaigns. Players can further develop their nation's capabilities through technological advancements, military traditions, religious policies, and mission trees that provide objectives and rewards.

== Development ==
Part of the game map, featuring regions such as Persia and Mediterranean Sea

The game was developed by Paradox Development Studio and directed by Johan Andersson. Formally unveiled in May 2018, the game was released on 25 April 2019 for Windows, macOS, and Linux. Imperator: Rome focuses primarily on nations and empires, with a small focus on character management similar to its chronological successor, Crusader Kings III; Andersson hoped that Paradox could make a modern sequel to Europa Universalis: Rome. As with Paradox Development Studio games from the time, Imperator: Rome was built using the Clausewitz Engine, but with the addition of new software known as "Jomini" (named after 19th century general Antoine-Henri Jomini) that allows for easier and faster creation of mods.

Development and support for the game was suspended by Paradox Interactive by May 2021. In June 2022, Paradox announced that the game would receive no further updates unless it was acquired by another studio or there was a surge in demand for the game.

On the anniversary of the game's launch in 2023, Imperator: Rome received a patch that is accessible through an open beta. However, it was stressed that this was not a revival of development on the game.

In April 2024, Paradox released the 2.0.4 "Augustus" version to the main product channel on all supported platforms. This was followed by patch 2.0.5, which was released to the beta channel in December 2024.

=== Downloadable content ===
Name	Release date	Description
The Punic Wars	3 December 2019	The Punic Wars adds missions and flavor content to Rome and Carthage, particularly surrounding the Punic Wars. The 1.3 patch introduced the mission system for all nations. The Punic Wars was released free of charge following discontent relating to Paradox's DLC policy.
Magna Graecia	31 March 2020	Magna Graecia introduces new gameplay mechanics and missions for many Greek city-states such as Athens, Sparta, and Syracuse. The 1.4 patch overhauled the religious mechanics through pantheons and holy sites.
Epirus	11 August 2020	Epirus is a content pack that adds missions and flavor relating to the Greek state of Epirus during the period of Pyrrhus' rule.
Heirs of Alexander	16 February 2021	Heirs of Alexander adds content for the successor states of Alexander the Great's empire (known as the Diadochi) and gives the player the ability to build customized great wonders. The accompanying 2.0 patch introduced major reworking of politics, population, and military mechanics as well as an updated UI.

=== Invictus Mod ===
In May 2021, days after Paradox announced the suspension of the game's development, a third-party mod called Imperator: Invictus was announced. Called Invictus for short, the mod overhauls existing content and flavour mods and adds additional content without changing the basic game mechanics. It is the most popular Imperator Rome mod on the Steam Workshop and continues to be updated by the mod's development team as of September 2026.

== Reception ==
Reception

Aggregate score
Aggregator	Score
Metacritic	76/100

Review scores
Publication	Score
IGN	8/10
PC Gamer (US)	92/100

The game received "generally favorable reviews", according to review aggregator Metacritic. IGN praised the game for its depth, "the amount of detailed, strategic stuff crammed into Imperator: Rome is equal parts impressive and daunting", while criticizing the game's user interface and tribal nations. The review also praised the game's political system, writing that the political warfare between people within nations is "a great driver of character interaction". PC Gamer described the game as "uniting systems from the most recent games" while still being "more cohesive than a 'greatest hits' compilation". Despite lower user ratings than they expected, the game's sales surpassed Paradox's expectations.

== See also ==
- List of grand strategy video games
- List of Paradox Interactive games
- List of historical video games
