= Crusader Kings (disambiguation) =

Crusader Kings is a video game released by Paradox Interactive in 2004.

Crusader Kings may also refer to:

- Crusader Kings II, sequel
- Crusader Kings III, sequel
- Crusader Kings (board game), a board game from Free League Publishing based on the Crusader Kings video game
