= Svea Rike =

1997 video game

- Developers: Target Games, Korkeken Interactive Studio AB
- Publisher: Levande Böcker
- Series: Svea Rike
- Platforms: Windows, Macintosh
- Release: 1997
- Genre: TBS

Svea Rike is a 1997 turn-based strategy video game based on the history of Sweden, which became an inspiration to the later-established and far more popular franchise Crusader Kings. The title roughly translates to "The Kingdom of Sweden". A sequel, Svea Rike II, was released in 1998.

== Development ==
The hybrid PC/Mac CD-ROM game was co-developed by Stockholm game development studios Korkeken and Target Games AB using Macromedia Director 6.x, under the label Mesmer & Block. It was published by Levande Böcker, a subsidiary of Bonnier Multimedia, in March 1997. Svea Rike was published exclusively within Sweden. Following the release of the sequel Svea Rike II, Target filed for bankruptcy and had its assets sold to Paradox Interactive.

Svea Rike was based on the award-winning board game of the same name published by Target Games, sharing the historical theme of simulating political and cultural events in Northern Europe in the period 1523–1818, the general game structure, and much of the media content. The notable additions for the CD-ROM version included a single-player mode against an AI, and a tactical combat system.

All wording and menus are in Swedish.

== Reception ==
Svea Rike received largely positive within the Swedish gaming press. Björn Tidal of Svenska PC Gamer gave it a 65% rating.

== Sequel ==
Svea Rike II
- Developers: Target Games, Korkeken Interactive Studio AB
- Publisher: Levande böcker
- Series: Svea Rike
- Platforms: Windows, Macintosh
- Release: 1998
- Genre: TBS

The sequel, Svea Rike II was released in 1998. The game opens in 1471 during the Battle of Brunkeberg. The goal is to ensure the player reaches the Peace of Fredrikshamn, while keeping Sweden's borders intact.

== See also ==
- Europa Universalis: Crown of the North (original title: Svea Rike III. Sequel to Svea Rike II.)
- Two Thrones (Sequel to Europa Universalis: Crown of the North)
