= Europa Universalis V =

2025 video game

- Developer: Paradox Tinto
- Publisher: Paradox Interactive
- Director: Johan Andersson
- Designer: Álvaro Sanz
- Programmer: Alexander Ivannikov
- Artist: David Horler
- Composer: Håkan Glänte
- Series: Europa Universalis
- Engine: Clausewitz Engine
- Platform: Windows
- Release: 4 November 2025
- Genre: Grand strategy
- Modes: Single-player, multiplayer

Europa Universalis V is a grand strategy game developed by Paradox Tinto and published by Paradox Interactive. It is the sequel to the 2013 game Europa Universalis IV.

It was announced on 8 May 2025 and released on 4 November 2025. It received generally favorable reviews from critics.

== Gameplay ==
Europa Universalis V is a grand strategy game that allows players to take control of a country and guide it through the period from 1 April 1337 to 1 January 1837. Unlike in previous entries in the series, most parts of the gameplay can be automated at the player's discretion, allowing the player to focus on specific mechanics such as trade or military while giving control over the others to the game's AI.

Europa Universalis V places a stronger emphasis on population simulation and internal state management than its predecessors, with the introduction of a detailed population system intended to model social classes, migration, and economic productivity over time.

== Development ==
Europa Universalis V was developed by Paradox Tinto. During its development, which began in 2020, it was known as "Project Caesar". Starting in early 2024, Paradox Tinto began releasing forum posts known as "Tinto Talks", which showcased several aspects of the game. These included mechanics centered around the economy management, its map, its depiction of the Holy Roman Empire, and diplomacy features. Later, on 10 January 2025, Paradox began releasing posts under the name "Tinto Flavour", which focused on specific countries in the game. The game was officially announced on 8 May 2025.

=== Downloadable content ===
Name	Accompanying patch	Type	Release date	Description
Fate of the Phoenix	1.2 "Echinades"	Immersion Pack	6 May 2026	Centering on the Byzantine Empire, new features are added including interactions with the Byzantine bureaucracy and laws as well as the Eastern Orthodox Church. Also adds flavor to revive Hellenism.
Across the Pillars	1.4 "Rio Salado"	Chronicle Pack	28 October 2026	Adds the "Battle for the Strait" historical situation, centering on control of the Strait of Gibraltar, while adding new mechanics and flavor for nations in the Iberia and Maghreb region. Further additions include trade and exploration mechanics, including gold caravans and treasure fleets.
The Auld Alliance	1.5 "Fealty"	Chronicle Pack	Spring 2027	Planned to center around the Auld Alliance between France and Scotland and their conflicts with England.

== Reception ==
Reception

Aggregate scores
Aggregator	Score
Metacritic	85/100
OpenCritic	100% recommend

Europa Universalis V received "generally favorable" reviews from critics, according to the review aggregation website Metacritic. OpenCritic determined that 100% of critics recommended the game.

IGN praised its unprecedented depth of simulation and its detailed population and terrain systems, but noted balance and tuning issues at launch. Rock Paper Shotgun also praised its depth, but said that its "overwhelming" complexity makes it less accessible than other Paradox titles.

=== Awards ===
Year	Award	Category	Result	Ref.
2026	The Steam Awards 2025	Most Innovative Gameplay	Nominated	
2026	29th Annual D.I.C.E. Awards	Strategy/Simulation Game of the Year	Nominated	

== See also ==
- List of grand strategy video games
- List of Paradox Interactive games
- List of historical video games
