= Kaiserpunk =

2025 video game

- Developer: Overseer Games
- Publishers: Overseer Games; Elda Entertainment
- Composer: Nikola "Nikita" Jeremic
- Engine: Unity
- Platform: Windows
- Release: March 21, 2025
- Genres: City-building, Grand strategy
- Mode: Single-player

Kaiserpunk is a city-building and grand strategy video game developed by Overseer Games and published by both Overseer Games and Elda Entertainment. It was released on March 21, 2025 for the Windows platform. The game merges multiple genres and is roughly set during the first half of the 20th century.

== Gameplay ==
The core of Kaiserpunk is made up of city building and production chains, with some 4x elements and with added grand strategy layers.

The game has several factions on the global map. The player is given a hub to manage, i.e a city you build up on a separate local map which is then used to produce and deploy army units to seize neighboring regions, of which there are over a hundred. Both the local and the global map are synced in real time. The global map offers the player the option to conduct trade and diplomacy with other factions. Depending on the extent of trade with the other factions, it could lead to an alliance or even incorporation by the player.

The notifications from the global map are incorporated into the local city management. The enemy is able to disrupt the players production and supply chains, causing long term issues. Every operational building you build in the city gives you development points, which are then used for the unlocking of additional technologies, which allow for producing more advanced manufactured goods, give additional building bonuses, new buildings and upgrades. The development is divided into several tracks: Living, Agriculture, Manufacturing, Utilities, Civics, Transport, Morale, and Military.

== Plot ==
=== Setting ===
Kaiserpunk is described as being set in an alternate universe spanning years between 1918 and 1950 and with some added fantasy elements. The developers cite German noir and the Roaring Twenties aesthetic as an inspiration for it. A world where the Treaty of Versailles was never signed, and in which World War I and World War II are being merged into one big long conflict are another descriptions for the setting.

== Development ==
The game was first announced on November 19, 2023. During its development, the game was described as an 'alt-history city builder grand strategy hybrid' with focus on production management and logistics. Due to the inclusion of 4X elements, some media outlets drew comparison of its gameplay to Civilization VII, though the developers discounted this, instead stating that the game is more similar to the Anno series.

Overseer Games provided a demo of an early build of the game for playtest during 2024. Two Steam playtests were organized in total, during which new features were added, and existing ones were reworked. The first one ran from July 20, to July 22, 2024. The game was initially slated for release in 2024, but it was postponed twice to February 27, and then to March 21 of 2025. Elda Entertainment joined Overseer Games as a publishing partner, whose employees were previously involved with games such as Cities: Skylines and Surviving Mars.

== Reception ==
Reception

Aggregate score
Aggregator	Score
Metacritic	62/100

Review scores
Publication	Score
Destructoid	7/10
GameStar	65/100
IGN	5/10

Kaiserpunk received "mixed or average" reviews according to review aggregator Metacritic.

In his review for Polygon, Jason Rodriguez, praised its city building as engaging and addictive but found significant issues with other aspects such as the UI and grand strategy. He states that 'trying to get your armies up and running — not to mention your navy and air force — is a painstaking and arduous task', which ultimately makes replaying the game 'tedious' and 'repetitive'. Destructoid described it as a weird mix of genres, a kind of 'Civilization merges with SimCity', reviewing it with a score of 7. IGN reviewer Lena Hafer described it as having an interesting premise, but lacking polish and having no sense of scale between its individual layers stating that the game would have been better suited as an early access title at this stage.
