= Sengoku (2011 video game) =

- Developer: Paradox Development Studio
- Publisher: Paradox Interactive
- Director: Thomas Johansson
- Producer: Johan Andersson
- Designer: Christopher King
- Programmers: Thomas Johansson; Olof Björk
- Artist: Fredrik Toll
- Composer: Daniel Pharos
- Engine: Clausewitz Engine
- Platforms: Microsoft Windows, Mac OS X
- Release: NA: 13 September 2011; EU: 16 September 2011
- Genres: Grand strategy
- Modes: Single-player, multiplayer

Sengoku: Way of the Warrior is a grand strategy computer game developed by Paradox Development Studio and published by Paradox Interactive.

== Plot and gameplay ==
The player assumes the role of a Japanese noble in 1467. The title means "warring states" and refers to the Sengoku era. The gameplay is similar to Crusader Kings II, another Paradox game. Nobles hold titles giving them an income from their demesne and their vassals. Relationships are based on character traits and situation. Soldiers and fleets are levied from your vassals according to how much they like the player. Mercenaries and hired retinues supplement their levies. Hostages are held to confirm peace treaties.

== Reception ==
Reception

Aggregate score
Aggregator	Score
Metacritic	70/100

Review scores
Publication	Score
PC Gamer (UK)	71%
PC PowerPlay	5/10

The game received "average" reviews according to the review aggregation website Metacritic.

The game was criticized by WarGamer for its lack of missions and the lack of a flexible starting date, atypical for a Paradox game.

== See also ==
- List of Paradox Interactive games
