= EU3 (disambiguation) =

EU3 may refer to:

- EU three, either France, Germany and Italy (largest countries at the founding of the European Union), or France, Germany and the UK (current largest economies in Europe)
- Euro 3, an emission standard for vehicles
- Europa Universalis III, a computer game by Paradox Interactive
