= Europa Universalis (board game) =

Strategy board game

Europa Universalis is a board game created by Philippe Thibaut and released by Azure Wish Enterprise on 27 April 1993. It is a geopolitical strategy game in which players compete as the powers of Europe during the period 1492 to 1792.

== Description ==
A game can last from six hours up to several weeks; Board Game Geek estimates the playing time to be 15 days. About 1,000 markers are used, as well as two 56 cm × 86 cm (22 in × 34 in) maps: one for Europe and one for the rest of the world. The English rulebook is 154 pages long including player guides and various tables.

=== Gameplay ===
The game is primarily designed for 6 players, but a 5-player variant also exists. Playable countries are Spain/Austria (Note: Under certain conditions, Spain player has the choice of switching over to Austria in 1700), France, The Ottoman Empire, Portugal/Russia (Note: Russia starts as NPC and other players are unable to interact with it, until 1560 when Portugal player switches his country to Russia, making it a major country), England, Venice/The Netherlands (Note: Holland starts with no provinces, because the Netherlands are controlled by Spain. However, as the game progresses, Spain receives events where they lose their provinces in the Netherlands to Holland. When these events occur in 1560, the Venice player changes his country to Holland.).

Each country has unique events, objectives, and special rules; for example, Turkey deal with corruption of the pashas, Russia's military power is limited until the arrival of Peter the Great, and England has access to powerful privateers.

== Extensions and variants ==
A first official extension was released and introduced new rules for forts and missionaries, as well as a new set of objectives. A second extension has been widely circulated on the internet. It introduced yet another set of rules, such as palaces, including historical monarchs with predefined characteristics and a faster combat system that could divide by ten or more the time for one battle, as well as many new minor countries and counters. It was never published officially.

Two more variants have also been circulated: the event rewrite by Risto Marjomaa and the Europa8 version by Pierre Borgnat, Bertrand Asseray, Jean-Yves Moyen and Jean-Christophe Dubacq, which introduces two more players, revised counters and maps, and is not finished yet.

== Reviews ==
- Casus Belli #79

== Adaptions ==
In 2000, Swedish video game developer Paradox Development Studio adapted the board game into a video game, with notable changes including replacing the turn-based gameplay with realtime. Paradox continued developing sequels to their adaptions, including Europa Universalis II, III, IV, and V.

In 2023, Paradox also published their own boardgame based on their video game, Europa Universalis: Price of Power.
