= Europa Universalis: Rome =

2008 video game

- Developer: Paradox Development Studio
- Publisher: Paradox Interactive (Note: Ported to Mac by Virtual Programming.)
- Producer: Johan Andersson
- Programmer: Thomas Johansson
- Artists: Jonas Jakobsson; Mikael Olsson
- Composer: Andreas Waldetoft
- Series: Europa Universalis
- Engine: Clausewitz Engine
- Platforms: Microsoft Windows, OS X
- Release: NA: 15 April 2008; EU: 18 April 2008; Mac OS X 7 July 2008
- Genre: Grand strategy
- Modes: Grand strategy, multiplayer

Europa Universalis: Rome is a grand strategy game developed by Paradox Development Studio. Published by Paradox Interactive and released in 2008, it became the fourth installment in the Europa Universalis series. It was the second game to be based on Paradox's Clausewitz Engine.

== Gameplay and release ==
The game is set during the time of the Roman Republic, beginning in 280 BC with the start of the Pyrrhic War, and ending with the rise of the Roman Empire in 27 BC. Players have a choice of leading any of over 53 factions, which represent ten prominent cultures including Carthaginian, Celtic, Egyptian, Greek, and Roman. The game was released for Microsoft Windows in April 2008, followed by an OS X version ported by Virtual Programming in July.

== Editions ==
The game's only expansion, Vae Victis, was released on 19 November 2008. Paradox had ideas for a second expansion based around the timeline of Alexander the Great, but this was never developed.

Virtual Programming published the Mac OS X version of the Europa Universalis: Rome Gold Edition on 23 July 2010, which includes the Vae Victis expansion pack.

== Reception ==
Reception

Aggregate score
Aggregator	Score
Metacritic	73%

Review scores
Publication	Score
1Up.com	C
Eurogamer	7/10
GameSpy	3/5
IGN	8.7/10

== See also ==
- Imperator: Rome, a spiritual successor to Europa Universalis: Rome
- List of grand strategy video games
- List of Paradox Interactive games
