= Hearts of Iron IV =

2016 video game

- Developer: Paradox Development Studio
- Publisher: Paradox Interactive
- Directors: Dan Lind (2016–2021); Peter "Arheo" Nicholson (2021–2026); Laszlo "Batya" Pieper (2026–present)
- Composer: Andreas Waldetoft; Mangalf; Sabaton
- Series: Hearts of Iron
- Engine: Clausewitz Engine
- Platforms: Microsoft Windows, macOS, Linux
- Release: WW: 6 June 2016
- Genres: Grand strategy
- Modes: Single-player, multiplayer

Hearts of Iron IV is a 2016 grand strategy video game developed by Paradox Development Studio and published by Paradox Interactive. It is the fourth installment in the Hearts of Iron series and the sequel to 2009's Hearts of Iron III.

Like previous games in the series, Hearts of Iron IV is a grand strategy wargame that focuses on World War II. The player can control any country in the world, starting either in 1936 or 1939. Players may decide to follow a nation's historical path, or lead various non-historical paths. The game allows players to play both single-player and multiplayer modes.

By May 2018, the game had sold a total of one and a half million copies worldwide. As of November 2025, the game has sold over seven million copies on Steam alone. Since its release, Paradox has released a large amount of downloadable content for Hearts of Iron IV.

== Gameplay ==
Hearts of Iron IV is a grand strategy wargame that revolves around World War II. The player may play as any nation in the world, with start dates on 1 January 1936 or 14 August 1939 in single-player or multiplayer.

=== Economy and "political power" ===
Military factories produce equipment, while dockyards build ships. These military factories and dockyards are constructed using civilian factories, which can also construct other buildings, produce consumer goods for the civilian population, and oversee trade with other nations. Most nations are initially forced to devote a significant number of their civilian factories to producing consumer goods, but as the nation mobilizes, more factories will be freed up for other purposes. Since the update coinciding with the expansion No Compromise, No Surrender, all factories need to be powered by coal, and power gain from coal can be influenced by technologies and other buildings in states such as dams or nuclear power plants.

With the expansion Arms Against Tyranny, the player can interact with the global arms market and access military industrial organizations, which improve military equipment over time.

Mobilization, conscription, and trade laws are represented as policies that the player may adjust with the proper amount of political power, an abstract resource that is also used to appoint new ministers and change other parts of the nation's government.

=== Military and combat ===
A nation's military is divided between ground forces, naval forces, and aerial forces. For the ground forces, the player may train, customize, and command divisions consisting of various types of infantry, tanks, cavalry, motorized, and mechanized battalions. These divisions require equipment and manpower to fight properly. The navy and air force also require men and equipment, including the actual warships and warplanes that are used in combat. The player can manually customize the tanks, airplanes, and boats with certain DLCs.

Land in the game is divided into tiny regions known as provinces (also called tiles), which are grouped to form states. Each state has a set number of building slots that affect the entire state, while provinces have province-building slots that affect only the individual province. Similarly, major seas and oceans (for warships) and the sky (for warplanes) are divided into strategic regions. Sea regions and provinces each have a type of terrain and weather assigned to them that determines how well different types of units will perform in combat there. Air regions do not have terrain types, but still have weather.

Divisions are deployed in provinces and can capture enemy provinces and engage in combat. How well divisions perform in combat depends on various factors, such as the quality of their equipment, the weather, the type of terrain, the skill and traits of the general commanding the divisions, aerial combat in the region, supply lines, their organisation, how high their defense or attack—'soft' or 'hard'—is, and supporting units. Technologies can be researched to improve equipment. Military doctrines can be upgraded using army XP, among other things, which often gives a more technologically advanced nation an edge in combat. If a division (or a group of divisions) successfully overwhelms an enemy province, they will occupy it. Some provinces may have victory points, which can push a nation closer towards capitulation if occupied. Occupying key provinces within a state allows the occupying power to access the enemy's factories and natural resources in that state. Resistance to occupation within a state, when a nation lacks a 'core' in a controlled territory, can hamper the occupying power's control over it.

Nations can develop nuclear bombs if they have the proper technology, which can be used to devastate enemy provinces and states. Since the release of the update coinciding with the expansion Götterdämmerung, special projects have been added which require facilities to be constructed to allow for the pursuit of nuclear energy and weapons, as well as other technologies such as super-heavy tanks, intercontinental bombers, or rockets.

=== Politics, diplomacy, and autonomy ===
Hearts of Iron IV also attempts to recreate the complex diplomatic relationships of the late 1930s. Nations may undertake a variety of diplomatic actions; they may sign non-aggression pacts, guarantee the independence of other nations, and grant or request military access, amongst other things. Another key feature of diplomacy is the ability to create a faction or invite other nations to an existing one. Factions represent the main alliances of the era, like the Axis and Allies. For gameplay purposes, real-world factions like the Axis and Allies are split into numerous smaller factions, like the Comintern, the Chinese United Front, the American Commonwealth (which later joins the Allies), and the Greater East Asia Co-Prosperity Sphere. Faction members may assist each other in wars, making faction members precious assets. The expansion No Compromise, No Surrender introduced new faction mechanics beyond those previously listed, such as faction goals, rules, research, military operations, intelligence, initiative, and influence. Other diplomatic actions are also available, such as coups, war justification, and influencing other nations with their ideology.

Countries in the game may be democratic, communist, fascist, or non-aligned. Each of the four ideologies has advantages and disadvantages; for example, fascist nations can go to war with other countries easily, but other nations are not as willing to trade with them. At the other end, democratic nations have difficulty invading other countries, but they can more easily guarantee the independence of any nation. If a nation's ideology is democratic, it may hold elections that allow party popularity to shift without the use of political power. If a nation's ideology is non-aligned, then it can be several things, such as a monarchy, dictatorship, or an anarchy. For example, if the German Reich opposes Adolf Hitler, it is possible to bring back the German Empire (monarchy), which is non-aligned. Accordingly, if the anarchists win the Spanish Civil War, they are non-aligned as well. If a different ideology becomes too popular in a country, a referendum may be held to convert the nation to that ideology peacefully. Otherwise, ideologies may come to power violently through coups, civil wars, or forced subjugation by a foreign power.

The expansion Together for Victory introduced a new autonomy system for subjects and their overlords, which allows for overlords to decrease the autonomy of and annex their subjects. In contrast, subjects can increase their autonomy and become independent. This is influenced through a points system, which can be affected by Lend-Lease, building in subject by overlord, national spirits, and more. Different autonomy types determine the bonuses the overlord receives from their subjects, such as a factory percentage or extra trade. The autonomy system for most countries includes the following autonomy types: Free; Dominion; Colony; Puppet; Integrated Puppet; and Annexed. Subsequent DLCs have added more autonomy types, such as Reichskommissariats, personal unions, EU member states, and Chinese warlord subjects.

This diplomacy is further expanded by the addition of espionage in the expansion La Résistance, which extends gameplay by allowing espionage in other nations and counterintelligence at home.

Hearts of Iron IV also uses the concept of "world tension", an abstract measure of how close the world is to global war, ranging from 0 to 100. Aggressive actions can increase world tension, while peaceful actions can decrease it. Depending on a nation's circumstances, such as its ideology, a certain level of global tension may be necessary to take actions like justifying war on another country or sending volunteers to fight in wars.

=== National focuses and spirits ===
While Hearts of Iron IV does feature some scripted events, it also includes a "national focus" system that makes fixed events less necessary than in previous installments in the series. Each country in the game has a "focus tree" with various "national focuses" that can achieve a variety of in-game effects, such as granting bonuses or triggering events. For example, for Germany to complete the national focus "Anschluss", Germany must first complete the previous focuses that branch down to the Anschluss focus. Meanwhile, other focuses can grant special bonuses, like faster research times for certain technologies or extra factories. While some bonuses (such as extra factories) are very tangible, others (such as morale improvements) are more abstract. These abstract bonuses are represented by "national spirits" that can be temporary or permanent. Not all national spirits are granted by focuses, and not all spirits are entirely beneficial. Focuses are completed over time; only one focus may be worked on at once, and working on one consumes some political power. Initially, only a handful of key nations, like Nazi Germany, the United Kingdom, the Soviet Union, and the United States, had unique focus trees; all other nations shared a generic one. Subsequent updates and DLCs have added focus trees to other nations as well.

=== Events and decisions ===
Country events are pop-ups triggered by national focuses, decisions, and other events (visible or hidden). Each event gives the player several options to pick from, often granting either bonuses or negatives (such as selecting leaders in an election), while also sometimes being used as a notification (informing players that a civil war is about to begin, for example). News events are another feature that notifies players when events of international significance occur.

Decisions were a feature added in the update coinciding with the expansion Waking the Tiger that allow players to select policies without using their national focus slot. They often cost political power and can be used for actions such as propaganda, resource development, state integration, country formation, and other policies.

== Development ==
Hearts of Iron IV was announced in 2014 and was originally slated for a late 2015 release. At E3 2015, creative director Johan Andersson confirmed that the game would be pushed back from its original release window, with the new release date being scheduled for the first quarter of 2016. This was an attempt to resolve several issues encountered with the game. In March 2016, it was announced that the game, built with the Clausewitz Engine, would be released on 6 June 2016, which was the 72nd anniversary of the Normandy landings.

Hearts of Iron IV has also received many free updates since the launch of the game (19 major with over 100 in total). These often coincide with DLC releases, and add new content or change content for the base game.

=== Downloadable content (DLC) ===
DLC timeline Integrated DLC in yellow Future DLC in blue
2016	Together for Victory
2017	Death or Dishonor
2018	Waking the Tiger
2019	Man the Guns
2020	La Résistance
2020	Battle for the Bosporus
2021	No Step Back
2022	By Blood Alone
2023	Arms Against Tyranny
2024	Trial of Allegiance
2024	Götterdämmerung
2025	Graveyard of Empires
2025	No Compromise, No Surrender
2026	Peace For Our Time
2026	Thunder at our Gates
2026	To the Bitter End
2027	The Giant Wakes
2027	The Price of Peace

Hearts of Iron IV has received several DLC ever since its release. This has included a variety of new content for the game, including graphical additions such as new armor models or new music packs such as the collaborations with the Swedish power metal band Sabaton.

Hearts of Iron IV has several types of DLC that change gameplay elements. These include:

- Country Packs which add focus trees and other content for countries in-game
- Expansions which add focus trees and other content for countries in-game, and also provide large mechanic overhauls and new mechanics for all countries
- Focus Packs which add focus trees and other content focusing on one country
- Theater Packs which add focus trees and other content to countries within a certain theater of World War II, and add gameplay content about that theater

Expansion Passes were introduced with the announcement of Götterdammerung as a way for players to purchase several upcoming DLCs at a discounted price. These are limited-time deals that end with the release of the last included DLC.

Name	Accompanying patch	Type	Expansion Pass #	Release date	Description
Together for Victory (Note: Part of base game since April 4, 2024)	1.3 "Torch"	Country Pack	None	15 December 2016	Together for Victory is a country pack that adds content to multiple nations within the British Empire: Canada, Australia, New Zealand, South Africa, and the British Raj. It also expands the gameplay mechanics between puppet states and their masters, with a special autonomy system that determines a subject nation's degree of independence. Features like an expanded Lend-Lease system and the sharing of technology are also added. The country pack was later integrated into the base game.
Death or Dishonor	1.4 "Oak"	Country Pack	None	14 June 2017	Death or Dishonor is a country pack that adds content to several minor powers in Central Europe and the Balkans, which include Yugoslavia, Romania, Czechoslovakia, and Hungary, while also featuring the ability to license military equipment to other countries. If Together for Victory is not owned, the expansion also adds limited puppet levels to the game. Following the release of the 1.10 "Collie" patch, content for Yugoslavia and Romania was reworked. The country pack was later integrated into the base game.
Waking the Tiger	1.5 "Cornflakes"	Expansion	None	8 March 2018	Waking the Tiger is an expansion that fleshes out the Second Sino-Japanese War with new content for Japanese-controlled Manchukuo, as well as Nationalist and Communist China, and a shared focus tree for the Chinese warlords of Guangxi, Yunnan, Ma, Shanxi, and Sinkiang. The expansion also adds new opportunities for alternate history within the focus trees of Germany and Japan, which were expanded, and several new formable nations were added. In addition, special projects and policies can be enacted with unique decisions, and several changes to the management of generals are present in the expansion. The expansion was later integrated into the base game.
Man the Guns	1.6 "Ironclad"	Expansion	None	28 February 2019	Man the Guns is an expansion that improves the naval combat aspect of the game with the inclusion of a ship designer, although numerous other changes and new features are also present in the expansion, such as adding content for the Netherlands and Mexico and also including new alternate history paths for the United States and the United Kingdom. The expansion also adds fuel as a resource separate from oil, and government-in-exile mechanics. The expansion was later integrated into the base game.
La Résistance	1.9 "Husky"	Expansion	None	25 February 2020	La Résistance is an expansion that adds espionage and occupation mechanics. Intelligence is greatly expanded, while occupation and resistance are completely reworked. The expansion also includes a revamped focus tree for France (including Free and Vichy France), a new one for Portugal, and two focus trees for the different sides of the Spanish Civil War, one for the Nationalists and one for the Republicans. It also allows the civil war to spiral into a much bigger conflict.
Battle for the Bosporus	1.10 (Note: Patch 1.10, aka "Collie", was released only to beta testers. It was superseded by Patch 1.10.1, which coincided with the release of Battle for the Bosporus.) "Collie"	Country Pack	None	15 October 2020	Battle for the Bosporus is a country pack that adds unique focus trees for Greece, Bulgaria, and Turkey. With the accompanying patch focus trees for Romania and Yugoslavia were also updated.
No Step Back	1.11 "Barbarossa"	Expansion	None	23 November 2021	No Step Back is an expansion that adds railroads, armored trains, railway guns, and a tank designer, with the possibility of customising chassis, weapons, and engines. It also introduces the general staff and adds unique focus trees to the Baltic countries, and a reworked one for the Soviet Union. An additional free update reworks the Polish focus tree.
By Blood Alone	1.12 "Avalanche"	Expansion	None	27 September 2022	By Blood Alone is an expansion that adds new peace conference options, a plane designer, unit medals, and embargo interaction. It also includes a reworked national focus tree for Italy, as well as new national focus trees for Switzerland, the Sultanate of Aussa, and Ethiopia.
Arms Against Tyranny	1.13 "Stella Polaris"	Expansion	None	10 October 2023	Arms Against Tyranny is an expansion that adds unique focus trees for the Nordic countries, customizable special forces units and a system for selling equipment between countries.
Trial of Allegiance	1.14 "Bolivar"	Country Pack	None	7 March 2024	Trial of Allegiance is a country pack that adds unique focus trees for Argentina, Brazil, Chile, Paraguay, and Uruguay.
Götterdämmerung	1.15 "Kaiser"	Expansion	Expansion Pass 1	14 November 2024	Götterdämmerung (German for Twilight of the Gods) is an expansion that centers on special projects and military raids. It also features updated focus trees for Germany and Hungary while adding new ones for Austria, Belgium, and the Congo.
Graveyard of Empires	1.16 "Countenance"	Country Pack	Expansion Pass 1	4 March 2025	Graveyard of Empires is a country pack that adds unique focus trees for Iran, Iraq, and Afghanistan, as well as revamping the British Raj.
No Compromise, No Surrender	1.17 "Musketeer"	Expansion	Expansion Pass 2	20 November 2025	No Compromise, No Surrender is an expansion that focuses on improved military doctrines, an expanded faction system, and improved naval mechanics. It also includes new focus trees for Japan, Nationalist China, Communist China, and the Philippines.
Peace For Our Time	1.18 "Case Green"	Focus Pack	Expansion Pass 2	22 April 2026	Peace For Our Time is a focus pack that adds a new focus tree for Czechoslovakia. This is the first gameplay-changing DLC for Hearts of Iron IV that features content created by modders of the game.
Thunder at our Gates	1.19 "Operation Postern"	Theater Pack	Expansion Pass 2	11 June 2026	Thunder at our Gates is a theater pack that adds new focus trees for Australia, Siam, and the Dutch East Indies. It also added military HQs and ship captains.
To the Bitter End	TBA	Focus Pack	Expansion Pass 3	19 November 2026	To the Bitter End is an upcoming focus pack that will add a new focus tree for Romania. Like Peace For Our Time, content of this DLC is also created by modders.
The Giant Wakes	TBA	Expansion	Expansion Pass 3	1 Q 2027	The Giant Wakes is an upcoming expansion that will focus on paratroopers mechanics, and industry restructuring. It also will include new focus trees for United States, Canada, Mexico, and a shared focus tree for Caribbean and Central American countries.
The Price of Peace	TBA	Theater Pack	Expansion Pass 3	2 Q 2027	The Price of Peace is an upcoming theater pack that will add new focus trees for Yugoslavia, Burma, South Africa and Venezuela. It also will add international organisations.

On 4 April 2024, Together for Victory, Death or Dishonor, and Waking the Tiger were integrated into the base game and are no longer sold separately or considered DLC. On 20 November 2025, Man the Guns was integrated into the base game upon the release of No Compromise, No Surrender and is also no longer sold separately or considered DLC.

== Modding ==
Hearts of Iron IV was developed to be more open-ended than previous games in the series. Partially as a result of this, the game can be more easily modded than its predecessors. According to game director Dan Lind, 64% of Hearts of Iron IV players use mods. The game is written in Paradox's Clausewitz Engine, a version of C++.

Mods can be found on Paradox Mods and the Steam Workshop. Many mods do not change the gameplay experience drastically and have become mainstays of the community. For example, 'Player-Led Peace Conferences' gives the player full control over the outcome of postwar peace conferences. Other mods encompass total conversions that change the game significantly, usually through the use of alternate history scenarios, different starting scenarios, or adding content to the game. Some mods have been successful enough to attract attention from the media, such as the following:

=== Kaiserreich: Legacy of the Weltkrieg ===
Kaiserreich: Legacy of the Weltkrieg is a mod set in a world where the Central Powers won World War I. It is considered the largest and most in-depth Hearts of Iron IV mod by many community members. The mod was first released on the Steam Workshop on 1 December 2016.

=== Equestria at War ===
Equestria at War is a mod for Hearts of Iron IV based off the TV series My Little Pony: Friendship Is Magic. The mod has been considered one of the best Hearts of Iron IV mods and placed 7th in the player vote for ModDB's 2023 Mod of the Year Award. The mod first launched on June 30, 2017 on the Steam Workshop.

=== Old World Blues ===
Old World Blues is a mod set in the Fallout universe. It has been praised for its effective portrayal of the Fallout series within a grand strategy setting. The legacy version of the mod was first released on the Steam Workshop on 17 February 2018.

=== The New Order: Last Days of Europe ===
The New Order: Last Days of Europe (TNO) is a mod set in an alternate 1962 after the Axis powers won World War II, where there is a three-way Cold War between Nazi Germany, Imperial Japan, and the United States. The mod has received praise for its rich storytelling and esoteric atmosphere. The mod was first released on the Steam Workshop on 21 July 2020. The modern version of the mod was released 27 March 2021.

=== Controversial mods ===
Some Hearts of Iron IV mods have attracted controversy. Millennium Dawn allows players to take control of any country in the modern day, including the Islamic State, and was embraced by far-right elements. In addition, the now-removed Deus Vult allowed players to take control of the Knights Templar and commit various atrocities.

== Reception ==
Reception

Aggregate score
Aggregator	Score
Metacritic	83/100

Review scores
Publication	Score
GameSpot	8/10
IGN	9/10
PC Gamer (US)	88/100

Hearts of Iron IV was a commercial success. It sold more than 200,000 units within two weeks of its launch, which made it the fastest-selling historically themed Paradox title by that time, ahead of Crusader Kings II and Europa Universalis IV. The game's sales surpassed 500,000 units in February 2017, and 1 million units in May 2018. It was the first Hearts of Iron game to reach the million mark, and the third Paradox title after Crusader Kings II and Europa Universalis IV to do so. The game received "generally favorable reviews" from critics, according to the review aggregator Metacritic.

GameSpot gave the game a positive review, writing that "Hearts of Iron IV embodies the hard truths about all-consuming war and the international politics that guide it." It argued that the tutorial was the only weak point, and that "for the dedicated, Hearts of Iron IV could end up being the best grand strategy game in some time."

It was also reviewed in Kotaku, with the reviewer writing it was "overwhelming in both its depth and, more importantly, its complexity" and arguing that some players unfamiliar with the franchise might find the game interface too complex to navigate easily.

IGN wrote a positive review, describing it as "an incredibly complex World War II simulation that will require potentially hundreds of hours to master, both in-game and poring over wiki articles that read like an economics textbook", but adding that "the payoff is brilliant for those willing to put in the time to learn". The review praised the layout, writing "thanks to an unusually striking look and clean, easily navigable interface, the biggest challenges Hearts of Iron 4 presents us with are the good kind: strategic planning, division composition, and fine-tuning economic and political policies". IGN went on to conclude that Hearts of Iron IV "is a strong contender for the title of the ultimate armchair-general game. The biggest problems I can point to are almost all performance-related, putting a slow, frustrating finale on what is otherwise an ingeniously detailed strategic stimulation of just about every aspect of 20th-century global warfare".

A review in PC Gamer described it as a "unique, beautiful, thrilling wargame", specifically praising its frontline system and production mechanics, but also criticising the ideology system for being too bland, and finding that combat was somewhat unintuitive, writing "while I found several flaws when I stood close to the tapestry, it's important to remember that Hearts of Iron 4 exists to encompass the whole sweep of the war".

Polygon praised the openness of the game, writing that "Hearts of Iron 4 goes a step further, allowing players to take control of nearly every single nation-state in the world during the same period. If you want to play as Eleazar López Contreras, a Venezuelan fascist with two army divisions and 12 fighter planes to his name, you can give it a go".

In 2022, six years after the game's release and shortly after the By Blood Alone expansion, Hearts of Iron IV hit a concurrent player record of about 70,000, owing to a week-long deal that temporarily made the game free-to-play. The year prior, the game had reached a record of 68,000.

=== Contribution to political extremism ===
Hearts of Iron IV has been criticized for contributing to extremism, particularly with the rise of the alt-right. The Global Network on Extremism and Technology published a 2022 study of the subreddit r/HOI4 and found that a minority of posts espoused anti-semitic views and Nazi-sympathetic views, but that these views were suppressed and that most comments were apolitical in nature.

In 2018, Kotaku also published a story about several of the mods for Hearts of Iron IV, and that many of them attracted overtly racist, Islamophobic, anti-semitic, and hypernationalist views and comments. Several mod writers expressed to Kotaku the view that players are free to enjoy their mods as they see fit, with one writing by email, "If there are Islamophobes among those who enjoy my mods, then that's how it is. I will not start a witch hunt against people who have different political views". Kotaku writes that much of the vitriolic comments are left up in the principle of freedom of speech, but some mods, such as Millenium Dawn, have taken active steps to remove particularly extremist views.

=== Ban in China ===
Hearts of Iron IV was banned in China on 2 November 2017, shortly before the announcement of the Waking The Tiger expansion for "a claim that the game does not comply with local law." This is despite Tencent, a Chinese game developer, buying 10% of Paradox Interactive on 27 May 2016.

China had previously banned Hearts of Iron in 2004 for "distorting historical facts" by depicting Tibet, Manchukuo and West Xinjiang as sovereign countries and for having Japan control Taiwan.

== See also ==
- List of grand strategy video games
- List of World War II video games
- List of Paradox Interactive games
