= Two Thrones =

2004 video game

- Developer: Paradox Interactive
- Publishers: NA: Strategy First; SWE: PAN Vision; UK: Koch Media
- Engine: Europa Engine
- Platform: Windows
- Release: ESP: January 21, 2004; NA: February 11, 2004; EU: July 16, 2004
- Genres: Real-time strategy, Grand strategy
- Modes: Single player, multiplayer

Two Thrones is a 2004 real-time grand strategy video game developed and published by Paradox Interactive. It is the sequel to the international version of Europa Universalis: Crown of the North. The title refers to the thrones of England and France.

== Reception ==
Reception

Aggregate score
Aggregator	Score
Metacritic	53/100

Review scores
Publication	Score
Computer Gaming World	1.5/5
GameSpot	5.4/10
GameZone	6.9/10
PC Gamer (UK)	40%
PC Gamer (US)	50%
PC Zone	24%

The game received "mixed or average" reviews according to the review aggregation website Metacritic.

== See also ==
- List of grand strategy video games
- List of Paradox Interactive games
- List of historical video games
