= Paradox Development Studio =

Swedish video game developer

- Type: Subsidiary
- Industry: Video games
- Founded: 1995; 31 years ago
- Headquarters: Stockholm, Sweden
- Area served: Worldwide
- Key people: Johan Andersson (Studio manager)
- Products: Europa Universalis, Hearts of Iron, Victoria, Crusader Kings, Imperator, and Stellaris series
- Number of employees: 150 (2021)
- Parent: Paradox Interactive

Paradox Development Studio (PDS) is a Swedish video game developer founded in 1995. It is closely associated with its parent company and video game publisher, Paradox Interactive. It is best known for its grand strategy wargame series Europa Universalis, Hearts of Iron, Victoria, Crusader Kings, Stellaris, and Imperator.

== History ==
PDS is based on the heritage of the Swedish board game company Target Games, and has been a game developer of PC-focused grand strategy games since 1995, including the Europa Universalis, Hearts of Iron, Victoria, Crusader Kings, Stellaris, and Imperator series. The company continued to create PC games and in 1999, the company was divided into two separate entities: Paradox Interactive, which focused on creating grand strategy games for PC, and Paradox Entertainment, which focused on creating board and role-playing games.

In January 2012, the company divided yet again into two studios, becoming Paradox Interactive and Paradox Development Studio. Paradox Interactive became the game publisher focused on PC games of various genres and Paradox Development Studio became the game development studio focused on grand strategy games.

The game development studio was one of the first video game developers to create games in the grand strategy genre, and most of the games the studio has developed fall into that category. Grand strategy games are strategy games that usually cover the entire world map and include elements such as economy, diplomacy and warfare.

=== Studios ===
In 2021, Paradox announced that its former wholly organized development-division Paradox Development Studio was reorganized and split into several individual internal development teams, with each one handling one of the Paradox's own IPs respectively, whereas PDS was initially split into PDS Gold (Note: Initially called PDS Yellow) (Hearts of Iron IV), PDS Red (Victoria 3, Crusader Kings 3), and PDS Green (Stellaris). While this left Imperator: Rome without a dedicated development team, PDS leads stated that they are figuring out how they will return to the series in time.

Later on, the need arose to further divide PDS Red into splitting off the handling of Crusader Kings 3 into another individual dedicated studio for the game, to efficiently proceed in further development, which became PDS Black.

In 2024, PDS Red was replaced by PDS Purple. Additionally, PDS Teal was created, working on a yet unannounced project.

Name	Studio Lead	Game	Location
Paradox Tinto	Johan Andersson	Europa Universalis V	Sitges, Spain
PDS Black	Johanna Uddståhl Friberg	Crusader Kings III	Stockholm, Sweden
PDS Gold	Niels Uiterwijk	Hearts of Iron IV	Stockholm, Sweden
PDS Green	Rikard Jansson (Åslund)	Stellaris	Stockholm, Sweden
PDS Purple^{1}	?	Victoria 3	Stockholm, Sweden
PDS Teal	?	?	Stockholm, Sweden
~~PDX Tectonic~~^{2}	Rod Humble	Life by You (cancelled)	Berkeley, California
^{1} Formerly PDS Red^{2} Closed after cancellation of the game

The US-based studio Paradox Tectonic was founded in 2019 for the development of the game Life by You. After several delays and ultimately following the cancellation of the game the day prior, PDX Tectonic was subsequently closed down the next day on June 18, 2024.

== Game engines ==
To date, Paradox have engineered two main proprietary game engines for its titles, Europa and Clausewitz. Both were also designed to be open to anyone who wishes to modify the original game files to create mods. As a result, games can be modded with as little as a text editor, which has led to the development of strong modding communities for each of Paradox's games.

=== Europa Engine ===
Paradox developed its debut game Europa Universalis in 2000, and used large chunks of its code for its next games. Although this code overlap was subsequently referred to as the Europa Engine, studio manager Johan Andersson clarified that the 'engine' had not been part of the initial designs of each of the company's first six games, and that it just resulted from copy-pasting large parts of code from one game to the next. In April 2008, Paradox allowed certain indie game developers to freely use the (by then) superseded engine as part of their Europa Engine Licensing Program. The move led to the development of games such as For the Glory, Arsenal of Democracy, Darkest Hour, and Iron Cross.

=== Clausewitz Engine ===
In 2007, the studio debuted a new game engine, called Clausewitz Engine in Europa Universalis III. Named after the Prussian general Carl von Clausewitz, the new engine is written in the C++ programming language and provides a 3D view of part or the totality of the world map, depending on the played game. Sengoku (released 2011) was the first game utilizing the Clausewitz 2 engine. The studio's 17th game, Imperator: Rome (released 2019), was also built using Clausewitz, but with the addition of new 64-bit software known as "Jomini" (named after 19th century Swiss general Antoine-Henri Jomini) that allows for better 3D rendering and easier creation of mods. The newly improved engine now also features support for DirectX 11.

== List of games developed ==
List of games developed by Paradox Development Studios. Note that in addition to this list there are two other games developed in the early 2000s when the studio was part of Paradox Entertainment, Crown of the North and Two Thrones, both part of the Svea Rike series.

=== Europa Engine ===
Name	Released	Expansions	Date
Europa Universalis	2000	—N/a	
Europa Universalis II	2001	—N/a	
Hearts of Iron	2002	—N/a	
Victoria: An Empire Under the Sun	2003	Revolutions	2006
Crusader Kings	2004	Deus Vult	2007
Hearts of Iron II	2005	Doomsday	2006
Hearts of Iron II	2005	Armageddon	2007

=== Clausewitz Engine ===
Name	Released	Expansions	Date
Europa Universalis III	2007	Napoleon's Ambition	2007
Europa Universalis III	2007	In Nomine	2008
Europa Universalis III	2007	Heir to the Throne	2009
Europa Universalis III	2007	Divine Wind	2010
Europa Universalis: Rome	2008	Vae Victis	2008
Hearts of Iron III	2009	Semper Fi	2010
Hearts of Iron III	2009	For the Motherland	2011
Hearts of Iron III	2009	Their Finest Hour	2012
Victoria II	2010	A House Divided	2012
Victoria II	2010	Heart of Darkness	2013
Sengoku	2011	—N/a	
Crusader Kings II	2012	Sword of Islam	2012
Crusader Kings II	2012	Legacy of Rome	2012
Crusader Kings II	2012	Sunset Invasion	2012
Crusader Kings II	2012	The Republic	2013
Crusader Kings II	2012	The Old Gods	2013
Crusader Kings II	2012	Sons of Abraham	2013
Crusader Kings II	2012	Rajas of India	2014
Crusader Kings II	2012	Charlemagne	2014
Crusader Kings II	2012	Way of Life	2014
Crusader Kings II	2012	Horse Lords	2015
Crusader Kings II	2012	Conclave	2016
Crusader Kings II	2012	The Reaper's Due	2016
Crusader Kings II	2012	Monks and Mystics	2017
Crusader Kings II	2012	Jade Dragon	2017
Crusader Kings II	2012	Holy Fury	2018
March of the Eagles	2013	—N/a	
Europa Universalis IV	2013	Conquest of Paradise	2014
Europa Universalis IV	2013	Wealth of Nations	2014
Europa Universalis IV	2013	Res Publica	2014
Europa Universalis IV	2013	Art of War	2014
Europa Universalis IV	2013	El Dorado	2015
Europa Universalis IV	2013	Common Sense	2015
Europa Universalis IV	2013	The Cossacks	2015
Europa Universalis IV	2013	Mare Nostrum	2016
Europa Universalis IV	2013	Rights of Man	2016
Europa Universalis IV	2013	Mandate of Heaven	2017
Europa Universalis IV	2013	Third Rome	2017
Europa Universalis IV	2013	Cradle of Civilization	2017
Europa Universalis IV	2013	Rule Britannia	2018
Europa Universalis IV	2013	Dharma	2018
Europa Universalis IV	2013	Golden Century	2018
Europa Universalis IV	2013	Emperor	2020
Europa Universalis IV	2013	Leviathan	2021
Europa Universalis IV	2013	Origins	2021
Europa Universalis IV	2013	Lions of the North	2022
Europa Universalis IV	2013	Domination	2023
Europa Universalis IV	2013	King of Kings	2023
Europa Universalis IV	2013	Winds of Change	2024
Stellaris	2016	Leviathans	2016
Stellaris	2016	Utopia	2017
Stellaris	2016	Synthetic Dawn	2017
Stellaris	2016	Apocalypse	2018
Stellaris	2016	Distant Stars	2018
Stellaris	2016	MegaCorp	2018
Stellaris	2016	Ancient Relics	2019
Stellaris	2016	Federations	2020
Stellaris	2016	Nemesis	2021
Stellaris	2016	Overlord	2022
Stellaris	2016	First Contact	2023
Stellaris	2016	Galactic Paragons	2023
Stellaris	2016	Astral Planes	2023
Stellaris	2016	The Machine Age	2024
Stellaris	2016	Cosmic Storms	2024
Stellaris	2016	Grand Archive	2024
Stellaris	2016	BioGenesis	2025
Stellaris	2016	Shadows of the Shroud	2025
Hearts of Iron IV	2016	Together for Victory	2016
Hearts of Iron IV	2016	Death or Dishonor	2017
Hearts of Iron IV	2016	Waking the Tiger	2018
Hearts of Iron IV	2016	Man the Guns	2019
Hearts of Iron IV	2016	La Résistance	2020
Hearts of Iron IV	2016	Battle for the Bosporus	2020
Hearts of Iron IV	2016	No Step Back	2021
Hearts of Iron IV	2016	By Blood Alone	2022
Hearts of Iron IV	2016	Arms Against Tyranny	2023
Hearts of Iron IV	2016	Trial of Allegiance	2024
Hearts of Iron IV	2016	Götterdämmerung	2024
Hearts of Iron IV	2016	Graveyard of Empires	2025
Hearts of Iron IV	2016	No Compromise, No Surrender	2025
Hearts of Iron IV	2016	Thunder at our Gates	2026
Hearts of Iron IV	2016	Peace For Our Time	2026

=== Clausewitz Engine with Jomini Toolset ===
Name	Released	Expansions	Date
Imperator: Rome	2019	The Punic Wars	2019
Imperator: Rome	2019	Magna Graecia	2020
Imperator: Rome	2019	Epirus	2020
Imperator: Rome	2019	Heirs of Alexander	2021
Crusader Kings III	2020	Northern Lords	2021
Crusader Kings III	2020	Royal Court	2022
Crusader Kings III	2020	Fate of Iberia	2022
Crusader Kings III	2020	Tours and Tournaments	2023
Crusader Kings III	2020	Legacy of Persia	2023
Crusader Kings III	2020	Legends of the Dead	2024
Crusader Kings III	2020	Roads to Power	2024
Crusader Kings III	2020	Khans of the Steppe	2025
Crusader Kings III	2020	All Under Heaven	2025
Crusader Kings III	2020	By God Alone	2026
Crusader Kings III	2020	Silk & Silver	2026
Victoria 3	2022	Voice of the People	2023
Victoria 3	2022	Colossus of the South	2023
Victoria 3	2022	Sphere of Influence	2024
Victoria 3	2022	Pivot of Empire	2024
Victoria 3	2022	Charters of Commerce	2025
Victoria 3	2022	National Awakening	2025
Victoria 3	2022	Iberian Twilight	2025
Victoria 3	2022	The Great Wave	2026
Victoria 3	2022	State and Revolution	2026
Victoria 3	2022	Century of Strife	2027
Europa Universalis V	2025	Fate of the Phoenix	2026
Europa Universalis V	2025	Across the Pillars	2026
Europa Universalis V	2025	The Auld Alliance	2027
