= Europa Universalis =

2000 grand strategy video game

- Developer: Paradox Development Studio
- Publishers: GER: Blackstar Interactive; SWE: Vision Park; NA/AU: Strategy First; UK: Koch Media
- Producer: Henrik Strandberg
- Designers: Johan Andersson; Klas Berndal; Henrik Strandberg; Philippe Thibaut
- Programmer: Johan Andersson
- Artist: Daniel Nygren
- Engine: Europa Engine
- Platform: Microsoft Windows
- Release: GER: October 20, 2000; SWE: December 15, 2000; NA: February 21, 2001; UK: March 2, 2001; AU: December 14, 2001
- Genres: Grand strategy
- Modes: Single-player, multiplayer

Europa Universalis is a grand strategy video game developed by Paradox Development Studio and published in 2000 by Strategy First.

== Development ==
The game was originally based on a French board game of the same name by Philippe Thibaut that was released in 1993. To facilitate the new game, a new proprietary software engine, known as the Europa Engine, was developed. The game went gold on January 23, 2001.

== Gameplay ==
Europa Universalis is a historically accurate real-time strategy game; it recreates 300 years of history from the Age of Discovery in 1492 to Napoleon's rise to power in 1792.

The game lets the player take control of one of seven European nations (others are available in different scenarios) from 1492 to 1792, expanding its power through military might, diplomacy, and colonial wealth. The game takes place on a two-dimensional map divided into approximately 1,500 provinces, and proceeds in a pausable real time format. Part of the presented world is invisible for the player (terra incognita) – it is however possible to explore individual provinces.

The player directs one of the eight European powers available in the scenario and represents the individual historical rulers. They change over time according to historical realities and have different skills that translate into the development of the country. For example, John III Sobieski has high military skills in the game and Suleiman the Magnificent is a character with high administrative skills. The game features a number of historical events, such as the Reformation, the Treaty of Tordesillas and the uprising in the Netherlands, which have a significant impact on the game.

The player can take care of technological development in their own country by allocating part of the budget to research. Technological progress is linear and consists in reaching higher and higher levels of technology in four areas: army, navy, infrastructure, and trade. With progressive development, the player gains new capabilities, such as improved units. It is also possible to increase spending to maintain stability in the state or to abandon all subsidies to increase the state treasury at the expense of rising inflation.

Rebellions of the population can be a problem for internal development. Rebellions occur when there are differences between the state religion and the religion followed in a province (there are several different faiths and religions in the game), taxation of the population through the establishment of a tax collector's office, or as a result of game-activated events. Rebels can even secede from the state and declare independence. Therefore, the stability system plays an important role in the game, which determines the risk of rebellion in the provinces, as well as the speed of city development and the amount of taxes collected.

A special element of the game is the colonisation of uninhabited territories. The player, using conquistadors (in the case of land forces) and explorers (for sea forces) has the possibility to discover new provinces and thanks to the settlers can settle the chosen territory.

== Reception ==
Reception

Aggregate score
Aggregator	Score
Metacritic	86/100

Review scores
Publication	Score
Computer Games Strategy Plus	4.5/5
Computer Gaming World	3.5/5
Gamekult	5/10
GameSpot	8.1/10
IGN	9/10
Jeuxvideo.com	12/20
Joystick	84%
Next Generation	3/5
PC PowerPlay	68%
PC Zone	76%

The game received "favorable" reviews according to the review aggregation website Metacritic. John Lee of NextGen said, "A full-bodied simulation of European turmoil and global expansion between the 15th and 18th centuries, Europa Universalis isn't all that original, but if historic realism is your passion, you'll like what you see." Computer Games Strategy Plus gave the game acclaim while it was still in development in Europe.

The staff of Computer Games Magazine nominated the game for "Strategy Game of the Year" at the 11th Annual Computer Games Awards, which went to Civilization III.

== Sequels ==
Europa Universalis was the first in the series, followed by Europa Universalis II, Europa Universalis III, Europa Universalis: Rome, Europa Universalis IV, and Europa Universalis V.

== See also ==
- Europa Universalis: Crown of the North (original title: Svea Rike III. Predecessor of Europa Universalis.)
- List of grand strategy video games
- List of Paradox Interactive games
- Wargame (video games)
