= Johan Andersson (game developer) =

Swedish video game producer (born 1974)

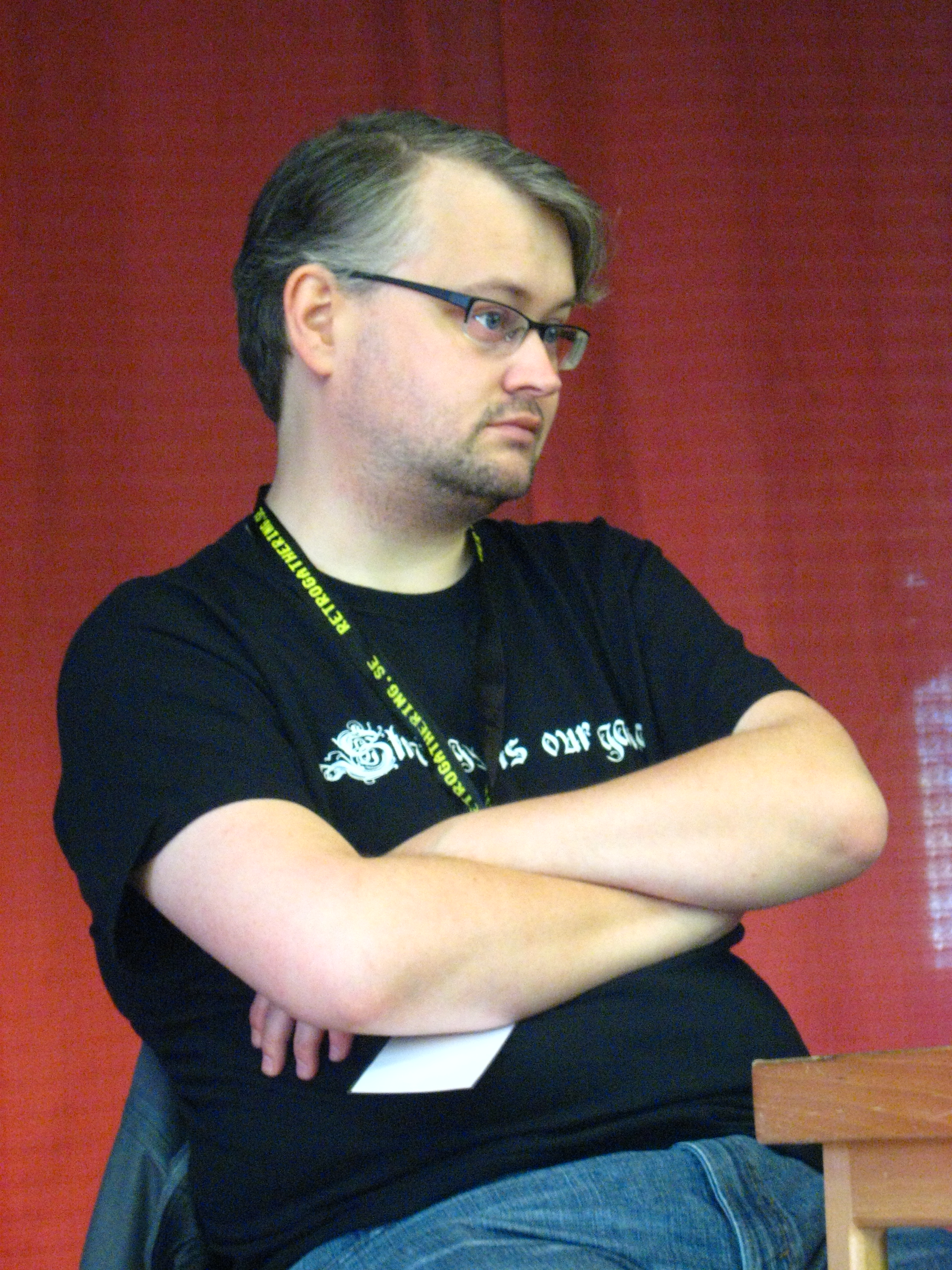
- Andersson in 2009
- Born: 28 August 1974 (age 52); Sweden
- Occupation: Studio lead of Paradox Tinto
- Known for: Designing grand strategy games

Johan Andersson is a Swedish video game designer and studio manager for Paradox Tinto, a division of Paradox Interactive based in Sitges, Spain near Barcelona. Andersson (usually simply called 'Johan' by users within the Paradox gaming community) is widely considered to be the central creative force behind the company’s grand strategy games, having led the design and production of flagship titles like Europa Universalis, Hearts of Iron, and Victoria.

== Career ==
Before working for Paradox Interactive, he was an employee of Funcom where he worked as a programmer for Sega Genesis games, such as Nightmare Circus and NBA Hangtime. He began working at what would later become Paradox Interactive in 1998, joining the original team that had been developing Europa Universalis.

Although he began his career as a programmer, Andersson later became a designer and producer at Paradox Development Studio, working on grand strategy games such as Hearts of Iron III, Crusader Kings II, Victoria II, Europa Universalis IV, Stellaris, Imperator: Rome, and Europa Universalis V.

Andersson's design philosophy is "to create believable worlds."

In June 2020, he became the lead of Paradox Tinto, a newly established Paradox studio planned to be based in Barcelona, Spain. However, Tinto was eventually established in nearby Sitges as many Tinto developers lived there.
