= List of Paradox Interactive games =

This is a list of video games developed, published and/or distributed by video game publisher Paradox Interactive.

== Published games ==
Name	Year	Developer	Platforms
Achtung Panzer: Kharkov 1943	2010	Graviteam	Windows
Age of Wonders: Planetfall	2019	Triumph Studios	Windows, PlayStation 4, Xbox One
Age of Wonders 4	2023	Triumph Studios	Windows 10, PlayStation 5, Xbox Series X/S
Airfix Dogfighter	2000	Unique Development Studios, Paradox Entertainment	Windows
Ageod's American Civil War	2007	AGEod	Windows
Ancient Space	2014	CreativeForge Games	Windows, macOS
Arsenal of Democracy	2010	BL-Logic	Windows
BattleTech	2018	Harebrained Schemes	Windows, macOS, Linux
Birth of America	2006	AGEod, SEP BOA	Windows
Birth of America II: Wars in America	2007	AGEod, SEP BOA	Windows
Chariots of War	2003	Slitherine Software, Paradox Interactive	Windows
Cities in Motion	2011	Colossal Order	Windows, macOS, Linux
Cities in Motion 2	2013	Colossal Order	Windows, macOS, Linux
Cities: Skylines	2015	Colossal Order, Tantalus Media	Windows, macOS, Linux, PlayStation 4, Xbox One, Nintendo Switch
Cities: Skylines II	2023	Colossal Order, Iceflake Studio (Note: Colossal Order worked on the game until December 2025. On November 2026, Paradox Interactive has announced Iceflake Studio will be taking over all development for Cities: Skylines II.)	Windows, Xbox Series X/S, PlayStation 5 (postponed indefinitely for console)
City Life 2008 Edition	2008	Monte Cristo	Windows
Combat Mission: Shock Force	2007	Battlefront.com	Windows
Commander: Conquest of the Americas	2010	Nitro Games	Windows
Crusaders: Thy Kingdom Come	2008	NeocoreGames	Windows
Dark Horizon	2008	Quazar Studio	Windows
Darkest Hour	2011	Darkest Hour Team	Windows
Defenders of Ardania	2012	Most Wanted Entertainment	Windows
Diplomacy	2005	Allan B. Calhamer	Windows
Dragonfire: The Well of Souls	2000	ComputerHouse GBG AB, Target Games Interactive AB	Windows
Dreamlords	2011	LockPick Entertainment	Windows
Dungeonland	2013	Critical Studio	Windows
East India Company	2009	Nitro Games	Windows
East vs. West – A Hearts of Iron Game	Cancelled	BL-Logic	Windows
Elven Legacy	2009	1C Company	Windows
Empire of Sin	2020	Romero Games	Windows, PlayStation 4, Xbox One, Nintendo Switch
For the Glory	2009	Crystal Empire Games	Windows
Fort Zombie	2009	Kerberos Productions	Windows
Foundry	2024 (early access)	Channel 3 Entertainment	Windows
Frontline: Fields of Thunder	2007	Nival Interactive	Windows
Galactic Assault: Prisoner of Power	2007	Wargaming	Windows
Galactic Civilizations II: Dread Lords	2006	Stardock	Windows
A Game of Dwarves	2012	Zeal Game Studio	Windows
Gettysburg: Armored Warfare	2012	Radioactive Software	Windows
Heart of Empire: Rome	Cancelled	Deep Red Games	Windows
Impire	2013	Cyanide Studios	Windows
Infinity Empire	2006	Typhoon Games	Windows
King Arthur: The Role-playing Wargame	2009	NeocoreGames	Windows
King Arthur II: The Role-playing Wargame	2012	NeocoreGames	Windows
Knights of Honor	2004	Black Sea Studios	Windows
Knights of Pen & Paper	2012	Behold Studios	Windows, macOS, Linux, iOS, Android
Knights of Pen & Paper 2	2015	Kyy Games	Windows, macOS, Linux, iOS, Android
Lead and Gold	2010	Fatshark	Windows, PlayStation 3
Legio	2010	Mezmer Games	Windows
Legion	2002	Strategy First, Inc.	Windows
Leviathan: Warships	2013	Pieces Interactive	Windows, macOS, iOS, Android
Life by You	Cancelled	Paradox Tectonic	Windows
Lionheart: Kings' Crusade	2010	NeocoreGames	Windows
Lost Empire	2007	Pollux Gamelabs	Windows
Lost Empire: Immortals	2008	Pollux Gamelabs	Windows
Magicka	2011	Arrowhead Game Studios	Windows
Magicka 2	2015	Pieces Interactive	Windows, PlayStation 4, macOS, Linux
Magicka: The Stars are Left	2011	Arrowhead Game Studios	Windows
Magicka: The Other Side of the Coin	2012	Arrowhead Game Studios	Windows
Magicka: Dungeons and Daemons	2012	Arrowhead Game Studios	Windows
Magna Mundi	Cancelled	Universo Virtual	Windows
Majesty: The Fantasy Kingdom Sim	2000	Cyberlore Studios	Windows
Majesty: The Northern Expansion	2001	Cyberlore Studios	Windows
Majesty 2: The Fantasy Kingdom Sim	2009	1C Company	Windows
Majesty 2: Battles of Ardania	2010	1C Company	Windows
Majesty 2: Kingmaker	2010	1C Company	Windows
Majesty 2: Monster Kingdom	2010	1C Company	Windows
Mount & Blade	2008	TaleWorlds	Windows
Mount & Blade: Warband	2010	TaleWorlds	Windows, macOS, Linux
Mount & Blade: With Fire & Sword	2011	TaleWorlds	Windows
Millennia	2024	C Prompt Games	Windows
Mutant Chronicles Online	Cancelled	Imaginations FZ LLC	Windows
Napoleon's Campaigns	2007	AGEod	Windows
Naval War: Arctic Circle	2012	Turbo Tape Games	Windows
Penumbra: Black Plague	2008	Frictional Games	Windows, macOS, Linux
Penumbra: Overture	2007	Frictional Games	Windows, macOS, Linux
Penumbra: Requiem	2008	Frictional Games	Windows, macOS, Linux
Perimeter: Emperor's Testament	2005	KD Labs	Windows
Pillars of Eternity	2015	Obsidian Entertainment	Windows, macOS, Linux, PlayStation 4, Xbox One, Nintendo Switch
Pirates of Black Cove	2011	Nitro Games	Windows
Pride of Nations	2011	AGEod	Windows
Prison Architect: Mobile	2017	Introversion Software	iOS, Android
Restaurant Empire 2	2009	Enlight Software	Windows
Rise of Prussia	2010	Paradox France	Windows
Rush for Berlin	2006	StormRegion	Windows
Salem	2011	Seatribe	Windows
Ship Simulator Extremes	2010	VSTEP	Windows
Star Trek: Infinite	2023	Nimble Giant Entertainment	Windows, macOS
The Showdown Effect	2013	Arrowhead Game Studios	Windows, macOS
Silent Heroes	2006	Dark Fox	Windows
Starvoid	2012	Zeal Game Studio	Windows
Steel Division: Normandy 44	2017	Eugen Systems	Windows
Supreme Ruler 2020	2008	BattleGoat Studios	Windows
Supreme Ruler Ultimate	2014	BattleGoat Studios	Windows, macOS
Supreme Ruler 1936	2014	BattleGoat Studios	Windows
Supreme Ruler 2020: Global Crisis	2008	BattleGoat Studios	Windows
Supreme Ruler Cold War	2011	BattleGoat Studios	Windows
Surviving the Aftermath	2020	Iceflake Studios	Windows, PlayStation 4, Xbox One, Nintendo Switch
Surviving Mars	2018	Haemimont Games, Abstraction Games	Windows, macOS, Linux, PlayStation 4, Xbox One
Svea Rike	1997	Target Games	Windows, Classic Mac OS
Svea Rike II	1998	Target Games	Windows, Classic Mac OS
Sword of the Stars: A Murder of Crows	2008	Kerberos Productions	Windows
Sword of the Stars: Argos Naval Yard	2009	Kerberos Productions	Windows
Sword of the Stars II: The Lords of Winter	2011	Kerberos Productions	Windows
Take Command: 2nd Manassas	2006	MadMinute Games	Windows
Tarr Chronicles	2007	Quazar Studio	Windows
Trainz	2008	N3V Games	Windows
Transport Fever 3	2026	Urban Games	Windows
Tyranny	2016	Obsidian Entertainment	Windows, macOS, Linux
Two Thrones	2004	Paradox Entertainment	Windows
UFO: Extraterrestrials	2007	Chaos Concept	Windows
Valhalla Chronicles	2003	Big City Games	Windows
Vampire: The Masquerade – Bloodlines 2	2025	Hardsuit Labs (Note: Hardsuit Labs worked on the game until February 2021. Paradox Interactive has announced it will be collaborating with another developer to finish production.), The Chinese Room (Note: In September 2023 it was announced at PAX West that The Chinese Room had taken over development of the game.)	Windows, PlayStation 4, Xbox One, PlayStation 5, Xbox Series X and Series S
War of the Roses	2012	Fatshark	Windows
War of the Vikings	2014	Fatshark	Windows
Warlock: Master of the Arcane	2012	1C Company	Windows
Warlock II: The Exiled	2014	1C Company (Ino-Co Plus)	Windows, macOS, Linux
Woody Two-Legs: Attack of the Zombie Pirates	2010	Nitro Games	Windows
Surviving the Aftermath	2019	Iceflake Studios	Windows
World War One	2008	AGEod	Windows

== Developed and published games ==
Name	Year	Developer	Platforms
Age of Wonders: Planetfall	2019	Triumph Studios	Windows, Linux, PlayStation 4, Xbox One
Age of Wonders 4	2023	Triumph Studios	Windows 10, PlayStation 5, Xbox Series X/S
Airfix Dogfighter	2000	Unique Development Studios, Paradox Entertainment	Windows
BattleTech	2018	Harebrained Schemes	Windows, macOS, Linux
Chariots of War	2003	Slitherine Software, Paradox Interactive	Windows
Crusader Kings	2004	Paradox Development Studio	Windows
Crusader Kings: Deus Vult	2007	Paradox Development Studio	Windows
Crusader Kings II	2012	Paradox Development Studio	Windows, macOS, Linux
Crusader Kings III	2020	Paradox Development Studio	Windows, macOS, Linux, PS5, Xbox Series X/S
Europa Universalis	2000	Paradox Development Studio	Windows
Europa Universalis II	2001	Paradox Development Studio	Windows
Europa Universalis III	2007	Paradox Development Studio	Windows
Europa Universalis IV	2013	Paradox Development Studio	Windows, macOS, Linux
Europa Universalis V	2025	Paradox Tinto	Windows
Europa Universalis: Crown of the North	2003	Paradox Interactive	Windows
Europa Universalis: Rome	2008	Paradox Development Studio	Windows
Europa Universalis: Vae Victis	2008	Paradox Development Studio	Windows
Hearts of Iron	2002	Paradox Development Studio	Windows
Hearts of Iron II	2005	Paradox Development Studio	Windows
Hearts of Iron III	2009	Paradox Development Studio	Windows, macOS
Hearts of Iron IV	2016	Paradox Development Studio	Windows, macOS, Linux
Hearts of Iron - The Card Game	2011	Paradox Development Studio	Windows
Imperator: Rome	2019	Paradox Development Studio	Windows, macOS, Linux
Life by You	Cancelled	Paradox Tectonic	Windows
March of the Eagles	2013	Paradox Development Studio	Windows
Sengoku	2011	Paradox Development Studio	Windows
Stellaris	2016	Paradox Development Studio	Windows, macOS, Linux, PlayStation 4, Xbox One
Runemaster	Cancelled	Paradox Development Studio	Windows
Svea Rike	1997	Target Games	Windows, Classic Mac OS
Svea Rike II	1998	Target Games	Windows, Classic Mac OS
Two Thrones	2004	Paradox Entertainment	Windows
Victoria	2003	Paradox Development Studio	Windows
Victoria: Revolutions	2006	Paradox Development Studio	Windows
Victoria II	2010	Paradox Development Studio	Windows
Victoria 3	2022	Paradox Development Studio	Windows, macOS, Linux
The Lamplighters League	2023	Harebrained Schemes	Windows, Xbox One, Xbox Series X and Series S

== Paradox Arc Published Games ==
This is a list of video games published and/or distributed by video game publisher Paradox Arc.

Name	Year	Developer	Platforms
Across the Obelisk	2021	Dreamsite Games, Fire Falcom	Windows
STARDEUS	2022	Kodo Linija	Windows
Nexus 5X	2024	Whatboy Games	Windows
Surviving the Abyss	2024	Rocket Flair Studios	Windows
Space Trash Scavenger	2024	Square Play Gamez, SquarePlay Limited	Windows
Darfall	2025	SquareNite	Windows
Escape The Mad Empire	2025	XperimentalZ Games	Windows
Tlatoani: Aztec Cities	2026	Perspective Games, Bellwood Studios	Windows
Guardians of the Wild Sky	2027?	Blue Isle Studios	Windows

== See also ==
- Paradox Development Studio
- List of grand strategy video games
- Wargame (video games)
- Wargaming
