= Philippe Thibaut =

French game programmer and designer

- Occupations: Game designer, video game designer, video game producer
- Years active: 1993–present
- Known for: Europa Universalis, Pax Romana, Great Invasions

Philippe Thibaut is a French designer and producer of several popular grand strategy video games, most notably Europa Universalis, the AGEod collection including Birth of America, AGEOD's American Civil War, Pax Romana, Great Invasions, and World War I: la Grande Guerre '14-'18.

He was the original designer of Europa Universalis as a board game that was published in 1993 by Azure Wish, before leading the adaptation of the hit game for PC in 2000 in collaboration with Target Games that became Paradox Development Studio, and then co-founding AGEod in 2005, that he subsequently merged with Paradox Interactive in December 2009. Working as independent game designer since 2012.

== Board games ==
Philippe Thibaut is the game designer of the boardgame Europa Universalis in 1993 (with later expansions). He also designed the boardgame la Grande Guerre '14-'18 in 1995. Both of the above were published by AWE.

Other designs are still unpublished to date.

== Video games ==
The games developed, co-developed and/or produced by Philippe Thibaut:

Game	Release
Europa Universalis	2000
Europa Universalis II	2001
Pax Romana	2003
Great Invasions: The Darkages 350-1066 AD	2006
Birth of America	2006
AGEOD's American Civil War	2007
Napoleon's Campaigns	2007
Birth of America II: Wars in America 1750-1815	2008
World War I	2008
Rise of Prussia	2010
Revolution Under Siege	2010
Pride of Nations	2011
Alea Jacta Est (video game)	2012
Civil War II	2013
To End All Wars	2014
Wars of Napoleon	2015
Blocks! Richard III	2019
