= Supreme Ruler (video game) =

1982 video game

- Developer: JMG Software
- Publisher: JMG Software
- Designer: George Geczy
- Platform: TRS-80
- Release: October 1982
- Genre: Strategy
- Modes: Single player, multiplayer

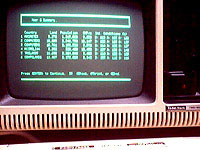
Running on a TRS-80 Model 4P

Supreme Ruler is a strategy video game in which a player controls a region's government and attempts to conquer a fictional world of fragmented states. The game simulates raising funds through taxes and spending on agriculture, government services, and the military. Up to 9 regions play at once, either human hotseat or AI-controlled, and all actions are resolved simultaneously at the end of each turn. The design of Supreme Ruler was influenced by earlier nation-state simulations such as Sumer, though the concept is taken further with the addition of multiplayer, military battles, and a more sophisticated design.

The game was created by George Geczy and produced and published by JMG Software International, released for the TRS-80 microcomputer system in October 1982. An updated and expanded version, Supreme Ruler Plus, was released in May 1983.

== Legacy ==
The original Supreme Ruler games were the inspiration for George Geczy and David Thompson to create a modern version for Microsoft Windows. This project began in January 2000 with the formation of BattleGoat Studios and culminated with the release of Supreme Ruler 2010 in May 2005, followed by sequels Supreme Ruler 2020 in June 2008, Supreme Ruler: Cold War in July 2011, Supreme Ruler 1936 in May 2014, Supreme Ruler Ultimate in October 2014, and Supreme Ruler The Great War in August 2017.
