= Supreme Ruler Ultimate =

2014 video game

- Developer: BattleGoat Studios
- Publisher: BattleGoat Studios
- Designer: BattleGoat Studios
- Platforms: Windows, OS X
- Release: October 17, 2014
- Genre: Strategy
- Modes: Single-player, multiplayer

Supreme Ruler Ultimate is a grand strategy video game developed by BattleGoat Studios. It is the fifth installment in the Supreme Ruler series and was released on October 17, 2014. The game is the sequel to Supreme Ruler 1936. It is essentially a compilation release, streamlining Supreme Ruler 2020, Supreme Ruler Cold War, and Supreme Ruler 1936 into one game, using the same UI as 1936, as well as adding additional features and gameplay.

== Gameplay ==
Supreme Ruler Ultimate generally operates as a real-time strategy game, but the player is able to pause the game and choose the game speed. In the game the player tries to control a country they have chosen. War is a dominant theme in the game with its military element played in battalion-sized units created by the player during the game. There is also a detailed economic aspect that records a large variety of statistics including under and over employment and natural resources. AI nations work on the same economy system as the player so for example if no one produces enough oil everybody will suffer.

Players can choose from nearly any existing country as their starting region, and some sandboxes and scenarios feature sub-national divisions to choose from (such as US States or European ethnic regions).

Starting eras of the game sandboxes include:

- 1914 - The Great War
- 1917 - The Great War
- 1936 - The Road to War
- 1940 - Europe at War
- 1941 - The World at War
- 1949 - Cold War
- 2017 / 2018 - Trump Rising
- 2020 - Divided States
- 2020 - Make America Great
- 2020 - Shattered World
- 2020 - World (Modern World)

Regions are controlled through a number of "cabinet departments" consisting of:

- State Department (Diplomacy)
- Finance (Treasury / Spending)
- Resources (Raw and Finished Goods Production and Markets)
- Research (Technology)
- Defense Production
- Defense Deployment and Orders

== Development and Release ==
Supreme Ruler Ultimate was developed and published by BattleGoat Studios on Steam. The game uses the proprietary BattleGoat Game Engine that has been used and updated since the release of the original Supreme Ruler 2010 game in 2005. The Supreme Ruler games series is a modern update of the original Supreme Ruler game first released for the TRS-80 microcomputer in 1982. Game developer George Geczy created the original game and has been the technical lead and primary programmer in each of the modern game releases. They have also stopped supporting Mac users, which while controversial they have no plans on changing.

Supreme Ruler Ultimate was released to the public on Steam for Windows and Mac OSX on October 17, 2014.

== DLC ==
Name	Release date	Price	Description
Trump Rising	26 July 2016	Free	Adds a new Sandbox starting on US Inauguration Day, January 20, 2017.; Updated "Modern World" relationships, leaders and regional economies.; Take control as President Donald Trump or as another World Leader.; Build the Trump Wall & Encourage regional growth with the Trump Tower economic development zones.
The Great War DLC	31 August 2017	$17,99	Adds new 1914 and 1917 start dates.; Adds a new trench and emplacements system.; New technologies and military types to reflect World War I armaments.; The ability to influence the course of history and play up to the present day.

== Reception ==
In a review of the game at Armchair General (magazine), Robert Mackey wrote that "Overall, the game does fine for what it is designed to do—provide a playable, real-time grand-strategy game covering 150 years or so of modern (and future) history."

Neal Sayatovich at Game Industry News, wrote that "Supreme Ruler Ultimate should be the ultimate go-to wargame on your list."

== See also ==
- List of grand strategy video games
