= Supreme Ruler The Great War =

2017 video game

- Developer: BattleGoat Studios
- Publisher: BattleGoat Studios
- Platforms: Windows, OS X
- Release: August 1, 2017
- Genre: Strategy
- Modes: Single-player, multiplayer

Supreme Ruler The Great War is a grand strategy video game developed by BattleGoat Studios. It is the sixth installment in the Supreme Ruler series and was released on August 1, 2017. The game is the sequel to Supreme Ruler Ultimate.

== Gameplay ==
Supreme Ruler The Great War generally operates as a real-time strategy game, but the player is able to pause the game and choose the game speed. In the game, the player tries to control a country they have chosen. War is a dominant theme in the game with its military element played in battalion-sized units created by the player during the game. There is also a detailed economic aspect that records a large variety of statistics including under and over employment and natural resources.

Starting eras of the game sandboxes include:

- 1914 - Brinksmanship (Alternate History)
- 1914 - The Great War
- 1917 - The Great War

There is also a game Campaign featuring objectives and events, starting on June 28, 1914. The Campaign can be played from a number of starting regions:

- German Empire
- United Kingdom
- Russian Empire
- France
- Austro-Hungary

== Development and Release ==
Supreme Ruler The Great War was developed and published by BattleGoat Studios on Steam. The game uses the proprietary BattleGoat Game Engine that has been used and updated since the release of the original Supreme Ruler 2010 game in 2005. The Supreme Ruler games series is a modern update of the original Supreme Ruler game first released for the TRS-80 microcomputer in 1982. Game developer George Geczy created the original game and has been the technical lead and primary programmer in each of the modern game releases.

Supreme Ruler The Great War was released to the public on Steam for Windows and Mac OSX on August 1, 2017.

== Reception ==
In a review of the game at Wargamer, Bill Gray called playing the game " a rewarding, if frustrating experience, but overall I'd say I'm very impressed", and "Overall, I feel the good vastly outweighs the bad and the ugly, so it has my strong recommendation."

John Breeden writing for Game Industry News recommended the game saying that "perfectly captures the flavor of the times, and the long slog that nearly murdered a generation."

== See also ==
- List of grand strategy video games
