= Crawl (video game) =

2017 video game

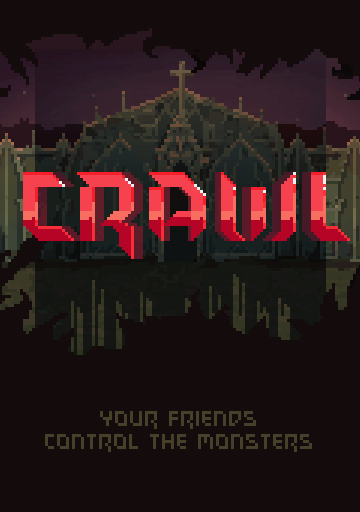
- Developer: Powerhoof
- Publisher: Powerhoof
- Programmer: David Lloyd
- Artist: Barney Cumming
- Composer: Alex Yoder
- Engine: Unity
- Platforms: Windows, macOS, Linux, PlayStation 4, Xbox One, Nintendo Switch
- Release: April 11, 2017; Nintendo Switch; December 19, 2017
- Genre: Beat 'em up
- Modes: Single-player, multiplayer

Crawl is a brawler video game by Australian developer Powerhoof. Up to four players and bots in local multiplayer advance through randomly generated dungeons with one player as the hero and the others as spirits who possess traps and monsters in the environment to kill and thus replace the hero. The game received a Steam Early Access release for Microsoft Windows, OS X, and Linux platforms in August 2014, and a full release for those three as well as PlayStation 4 and Xbox One in April 2017 and a release for Nintendo Switch on December 19, 2017.

== Gameplay ==
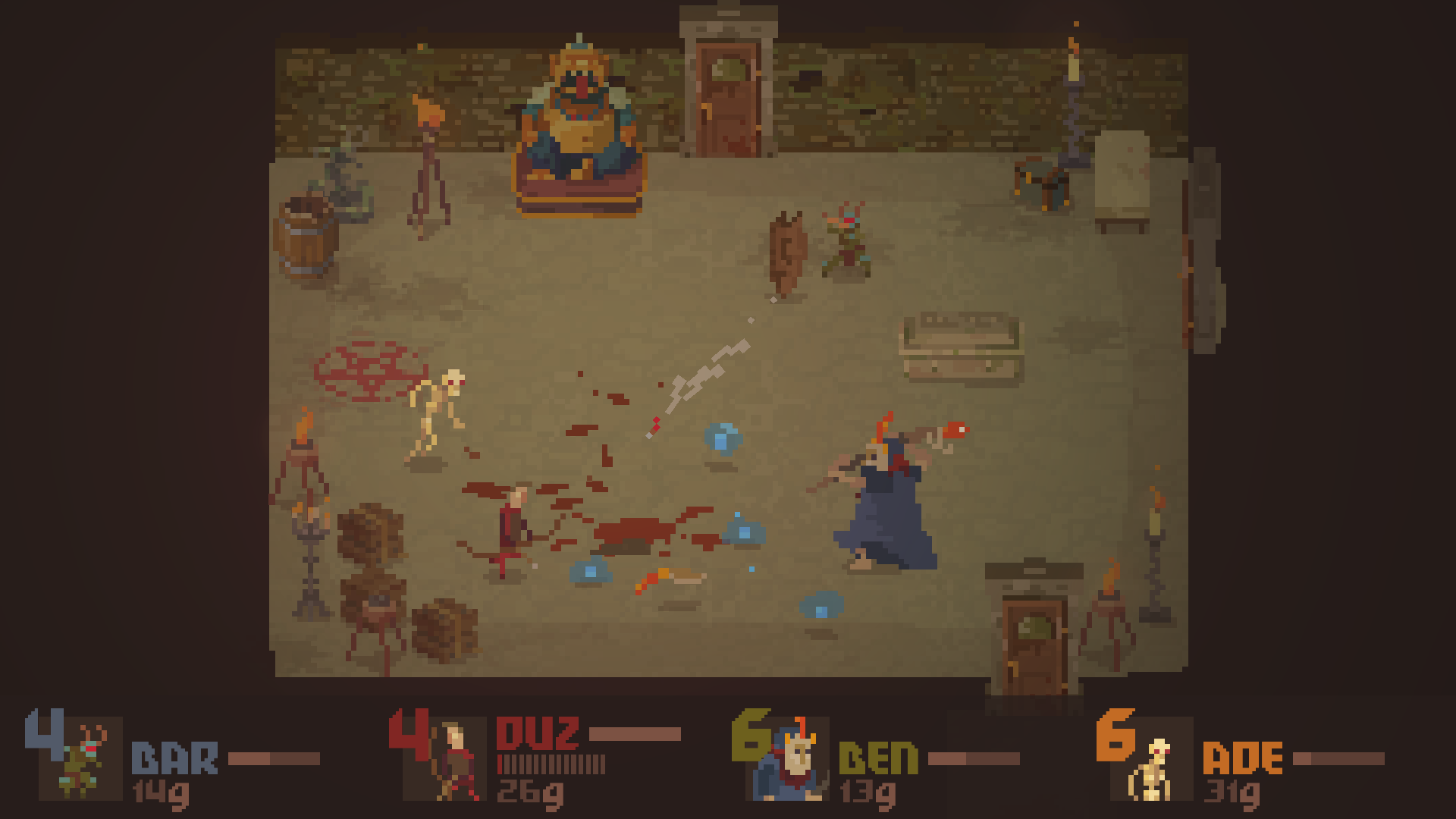
A screenshot of the gameplay, depicting the art-style and combat

Crawl is a cross-genre game with roguelike, bullet hell, and brawler elements for up to four offline players and bots. The main player advances through randomly generated dungeons as a human hero while up to three other spirit players control the dungeon's enemies and traps to kill the main player. The spirit player who kills the human hero swaps roles to become the next main player. Players earn experience as they progress through the dungeon in both the human hero and the non-human spirit roles. Hero experience unlocks new attacks and spells, and spirit experience unlocks stronger enemies to possess. Each player's human hero experience level, weapon, and stats progress is preserved between turns. Crawl was designed to be more fast-paced and arcade-like than strategic, and includes genre-standard activities like collecting loot and upgradable weapons and magic items. Once player spirits possess "monster spawners" and traps in the active room, they cannot leave the form until they die or kill the main character. The players and enemies grow progressively more powerful over the course of a match. The game ends when a human hero reaches experience level 10, enters a portal, and defeats a final boss whose limbs are controlled cooperatively by the other players. Typical matches last about 30 minutes.

== Development ==
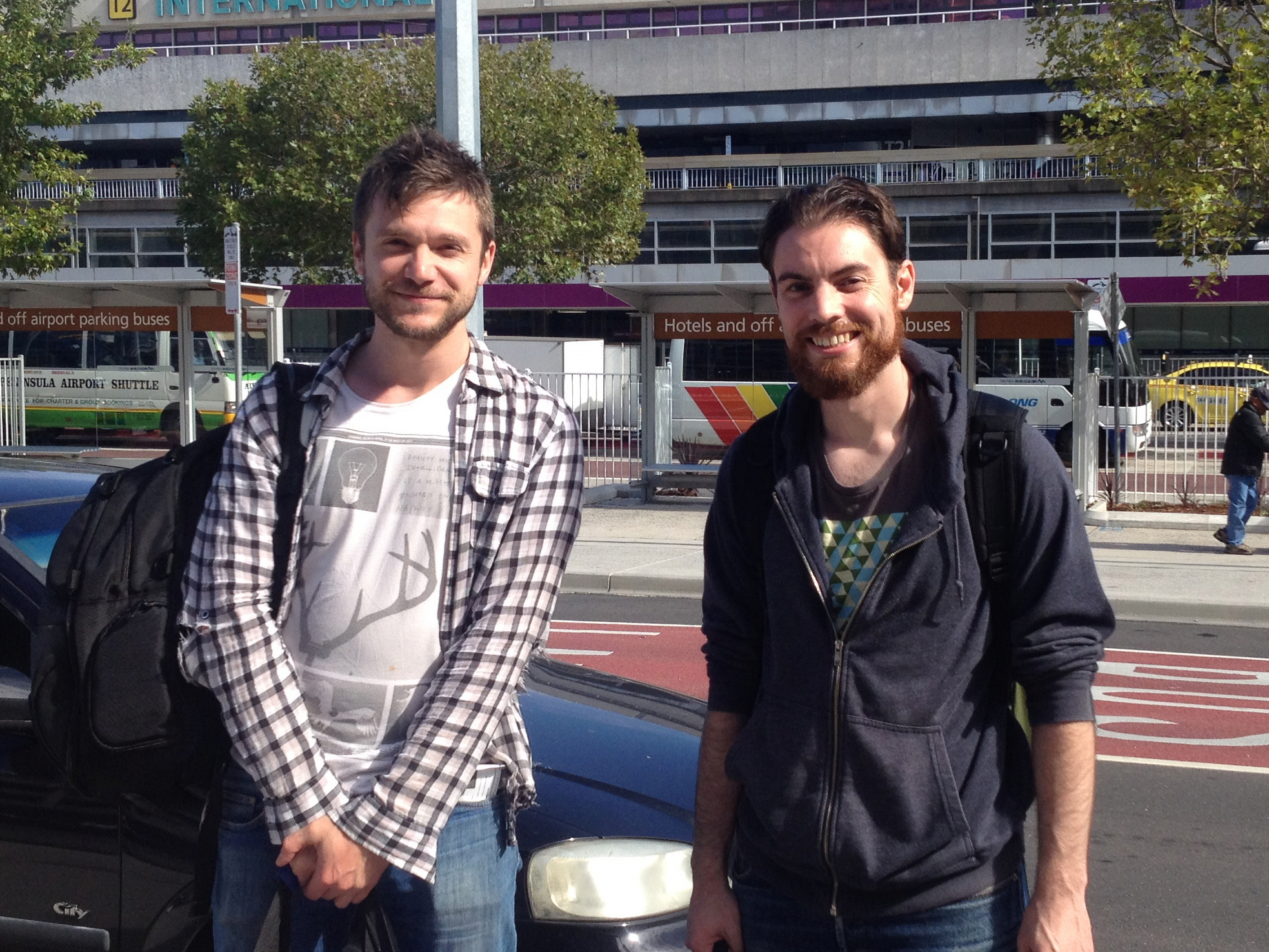
Powerhoof's Barney and Dave

Crawl was developed by Powerhoof, a two-person indie studio based in Melbourne. They described the game as their version of four-player Gauntlet combined with the Japanese bullet hell genre, or a combination of Super Bomberman and The Legend of Zelda. The game was made on the Unity game engine, and the developers designed a pixelated version of Gabe Newell as an in-game boss.

The game was "greenlit" on Steam within twenty-four hours. There is no online multiplayer. The game was expected for release on Steam Early Access in July 2014, but was delayed due to an issue pertaining to Powerhoof's taxes and formation as a company. The game was released on Steam Early Access on August 6, 2014 for Microsoft Windows, OS X, and Linux platforms. The full version released for computers, PlayStation 4, and Xbox One on April 11, 2017. A Wii U console version was planned in 2014.

== Reception ==
Reception

Aggregate score
Aggregator	Score
Metacritic	XONE: 76/100; NS: 82/100

Critics placed Crawl in a trend of local multiplayer functionality amongst indie games. Pete Davison of USgamer wrote that the game bridged multiple genres and was an example of the resurgence of couch co-op's fashionability. Rock, Paper, Shotgun's Nathan Grayson compared the game's premise with Dungeonland. Hardcore Gamer's Marcus Estrada called the game's concept "ingenious" and praised its capacity as a party game. In reviewing a prerelease version, Estrada wrote that the game had issues with gameplay pacing, lackluster artificial intelligence, and opportunities for players to hold up the game.

The game sold over 10,000 copies in its first 12 days on sale on early access.
