= Achtung Panzer: Kharkov 1943 =

2010 real-time strategy video game

- Developer: Graviteam
- Publishers: RU: 1C Games; NA: Paradox Interactive; UK: Mamba Games
- Platform: Windows
- Release: RU: 11 September 2009; NA: 25 February 2010; UK: 14 May 2010
- Genres: Real-time strategy, wargame

Achtung Panzer: Kharkov 1943 (Russian: Линия фронта: Битва за Харьков) is a 2010 single player, real-time strategy video game developed by Ukrainian studio Graviteam and published by Paradox Interactive.

== Gameplay ==
The game covers a relatively short segment of the Third Battle of Kharkov between Germany and the Soviet Union, taking place from 2 – 8 March 1943, while the real battle spanned from 19 February – 15 March 1943. The game has 6 scenarios to choose from, set in different historically accurate battles surrounding the Third Battle of Kharkov. 2 of these scenarios have you controlling the Germans, while the other 4 have you controlling the Soviets. The game also contains an editor so players can create their own scenarios, with several training scenarios being available.

Units in the game consist of platoon size groupings of soldiers, with 250 types of soldiers and officers and an additional 40 types of combat and tactical vehicles available. A 3D encyclopaedia of the units available is also present, allowing you to see the capabilities of both the German and Soviet units. Vehicles in game, much like in Steel Fury: Kharkov 1942, the previous game of the series, simulate penetration values, each part of vehicles and individual members of the crew. This means that a tank may become immobilised when hit in the tracks or the engine, or a Molotov cocktail may set the tank alight. It also means that shells fired at vehicles may ricochet or not cause any damage at all.

When in a scenario the game contains two modes, a strategic and a tactical map mode. The strategic map mode is represented by a 2D topographical map separated into grids, where you can get an idea of the scale of the battle and move your units to various positions, including key points on the map. While you do so, the enemy will be doing the same. If you leave a unit in a single grid, they will be able to dig trenches and foxholes to use in a battle.

When two units meet in a single square, a battle may begin, moving into the tactical map. A battle also consists of units in neighbouring squares as well, as such your units can be reinforced by nearby units and vice versa. Each turn in the strategic map signifies 4 hours of in game time, meaning that when you get into a battle you may either be playing during the day or the night. During the night there are various simulated light sources such as parachute flares and burning vehicles.

The tactical map is in 3D, beginning with showing you where you can deploy squads with the help of a colour coded grid overlay, the colours denoting where is best to place certain types of units. Once units are placed and the battle begins, the game goes into real time, allowing you to move your units around the battlefield to capture key points and assault enemy positions. Circles around a selected unit denotes spotting ranges, firing ranges or a commander's area of effect.

The game contains what the developers describe as a "fully interactive landscape", meaning that you can "tear down, blow-up, and destroy everything from a small bush to an entire village". This allows you to deny the enemy cover and flush out squads by firing artillery into a forest where you think an enemy may be hiding. You can also fight on the same battleground several times during a scenario and take advantage of prior battles, using artillery craters made during previous battles as makeshift foxholes for your squads. You can see knocked out vehicles from prior battles as well. Squads will also make use of various features, such as scavenging weapons from corpses, entering buildings and riding on armoured vehicles.

The more key points and area the player holds, the more victory points they will gain at the end of a turn. The player with the most victory points at the end of the scenario is declared the winner.

== Reception ==
Reception

Aggregate scores
Aggregator	Score
GameRankings	80.00%
Metacritic	70/100

Review score
Publication	Score
GameStar	58/100

Achtung Panzer: Kharkov 1943 received mixed reviews from critics upon release. On Metacritic, the game holds a score of 70/100 based on 6 reviews, indicating "mixed or average reviews". On GameRankings, the game holds a score of 80.00% based on 5 reviews.

ArmchairGeneral described the tutorial as "a series of slow-loading large tool tips, textually explaining what an interface button or symbol is. BORING. It takes a very long time for it to cycle through the whole process, if a player is able to stay awake for it. Three manuals come in .pdf form with the downloaded GamersGate version, yet they don't do much better in explaining the game. The primary game manual was not translated to English well and is a pain to read at times." Rock Paper Shotgun had similar concerns, saying "AP's manual would benefit from a few more pages, its tool-tips from better translation. The devs have gone for a stripped down RTS-style interface rather than CC/CM-esque pop-up menus. There's sense in this approach, but the result is too condensed for its own good. It takes a few days of experimentation to discover the impact of different combinations of movement, attack, and formation modes."

ArmchairGeneral also had concerns about the AI, saying "Path-finding was also a pain at times, as units just didn't seem to want to go exactly where they were instructed to go. Making use of the movement orders buttons is imperative, and worked much better than the easier method of clicking on the desired destination. It also seemed units didn't automatically run for cover when taking fire; the player has to click on the "go on defensive" button. Taken together, these factors make for a much greater degree of micromanaging, not always a good thing-especially in an RTS game. The official website touts the AI as "analyses tactical movements of player and chooses the best strategy based on opponents’ behaviour rather than follows scripts." However, there were a couple of combat actions where this reviewer would have to call that statement suspect. On one occasion, the enemy didn't even attempt to flank approaching forces they could clearly see coming. Another time, the enemy was under heavy fire yet remained plain sight on an open field instead of retreating back a few meters into the woodline."

Despite these concerns with the game, the reviewer went on to say "Achtung Panzer: Kharkov 1943 is still a pleasing war game, especially for the $20 price tag. The attention to detail that went into the units and maps alone make it worthy, and the added combat ballistics and 3D action help push it up a few more notches. Wargamers desiring a fresh look into the Battle of Kharkov would do well to buy Achtung Panzer: Kharkov 1943."

Rock Paper Shotgun had similar sentiments surrounding the AI, saying in their review "Artificial adversaries aren't particularly good at using quirky kit like mortar halftracks and tank destroyers. The Marder II's thin armour and exposed crew make it a poor choice for close infantry support yet the AI often employs them in this way. I'd like to see all vehicles especially German armour and halftracks being a tad more backward in coming forward. Infantry would also benefit from a sharpened self-preservation instinct. At the moment too many of the poor buggers perish while advancing gamely into the teeth of chattering machine-guns. If Graviteam could get them to use covered routes more often (admittedly not always possible in the hedgeless Ukrainian terrain) and lay down more suppressive fire before assaulting (again, not always possible) then defending would be an even more challenging business."

Rock Paper Shotgun did have a unique complaint relating to the placement of victory points, saying "AP's AI is guided by victory locations some of which are historical - villages, key buildings etc. - others randomly generated. The latter can feel pretty arbitrary at times. Watching the AI waste blood and lead securing an unremarkable field at the bottom of a valley, doesn't feel right. If flags were placed a little more thoughtfully, favouring hilltops, hamlets, copses and road junctions, topographical fixation would feel more natural."

Much like ArmchairGeneral, they also praised the game, saying "Don't mistake these grumblings for serious discontent. The majority of battles I've overseen over the last few days have been strikingly resonant affairs. If I close my eyes and think back, I see soldiers spilling from half-tracks then pushing forward while those same halftracks provide motherly support. I see defences crumbling one trench or one house at a time, brutal midnight knifefights for bridges, rail crossings and anonymous thickets."

== See also ==
- Wargame (video games)
- List of Paradox Interactive games
- List of PC games
- 2010 in video gaming
