= Foundry (disambiguation) =

A foundry is a factory that produces metal castings.

Foundry or The Foundry may also refer to:

== Manufacturing ==
- Type foundry, a type of company that produces and/or distributes typefaces
- Semiconductor fabrication plant, a factory where semiconductor devices are manufactured using the foundry model

== Other ==
- The Foundery (or Foundry), an 18th-century Methodist chapel London established by John Wesley
- The Foundry, a U.S. organization identified as a white nationalist hate group by the Southern Poverty Law Center
- The Foundry Visionmongers, a London-based VFX software company
- The Foundry, East Quay, Peel, Isle of Man, one of Isle of Man's Registered Buildings
- Foundry (bar), a bar in Shoreditch
- Foundry Networks, a U.S. Ethernet switch and router manufacturer
- "The Foundry" (Supernatural), an episode of the television series Supernatural
- Foundry (band), an American hard rock band from Las Vegas
- Foundry (video game), a 2024 video game
- Wargames Foundry, a games company created by Bryan Ansell
- Foundry, a network of mental health resource centres in British Columbia
- Foundry, a fictional planet in the Star Wars franchise
- Foundry, a former subsidiary of International Data Group that was sold to Regent LP in 2025
- Foundry, a cryptocurrency mining services company owned by Digital Currency Group
