= Chariots of War =

2003 video game

- Developers: Slitherine Software; Paradox Interactive
- Publishers: NA: Strategy First; UK: Koch Media; SWE: PAN Vision
- Producer: François Bolduc
- Designer: Iain McNeil
- Programmer: David Parsons
- Artists: Fad; Marcus Edström
- Platform: Windows
- Release: NA: June 11, 2003; UK: July 4, 2003
- Genre: Computer wargame
- Mode: Single-player

Chariots of War is an isometric 2D computer wargame, developed by Slitherine Software and Paradox Interactive, and published by Strategy First. It is set in the ancient Near East.

== Gameplay ==
The strategic layer of Chariots of War is turn-based, though unlike Civilization, the focus is almost entirely on real-time tactical combat. The game is similar to Slitherine's earlier wargame Legion, and uses the same graphics engine.

There are 58 different civilizations to play, all divided into the following ethnic groups:

- Assyrian
- Bedouin
- Egyptian
- Hittites
- Mitanni
- Nubian
- Skythian (Scythian)
- Summerian (Sumerian)
- Syrian
- Tribal

There are nine different resources to collect (food, building materials, copper, tin, wood, gold, gems, incense, and horses), which are used to construct buildings and units. While trade and diplomacy do feature in the game, they are of lesser importance, as conquest is the only way to attain victory.

The battles themselves take place on a separate deployment screen. The player's forces are positioned across one third of the battlefield, and the player alters their formations and gives certain orders. As in Legion, the actual fighting is automated, so the initial orders are the only input in the battle until it is over.

The game features both campaign and non-campaign modes of play.

== Reception ==
Reception

Aggregate score
Aggregator	Score
Metacritic	54/100

Review scores
Publication	Score
Computer Gaming World	2/5
GameSpot	6/10
GameSpy	2/5
GameZone	7.4/10
IGN	5/10
PC Gamer (UK)	24%
PC Gamer (US)	58%
PC Zone	47%

The game received "mixed" reviews according to the review aggregation website Metacritic.

== See also ==
- List of Paradox Interactive games
