= Eon Digital Entertainment =

British computer games publishing company

Eon Digital Entertainment was a computer games publishing company based in London, UK, operating globally. It was founded by John Burns, now of Electronic Arts and a former managing director of Activision Europe as well as senior management figure at Atari, Sega and Bandai. Other management included Sara Pelton of Ubisoft&Activision, James Cato of Take 2 Interactive and several other experienced industry management figures.

The company was founded in 2000, initially targeting the PlayStation and Game Boy platforms. Later they went on to also publish several PC and PlayStation 2 games, the first one was called Airfix Dogfighter. In 2000 the company merged with an Italian distributor, gaming TV station and website to form Digital Bros, a planned 'Total gaming company' which subsequently floated on the Italian stock exchange in late 2000. In 2002, Eon was closed after Burns departed the company leaving some developers like Bethesda Softworks to search for new publishers. Eon for example had been set to release The Elder Scrolls III: Morrowind and Sea Dogs in Europe as well as Star Trek Elite Force and others.

== Games published ==
- Airfix Dogfighter (PC)
- Crime Cities (PC, 2000)
- Mission: Humanity (PC)
- SUper (PC)
- Super Bust-A-Move (PC)
- Z: Steel Soldiers (PC, 2001)
- Builder's Block (PlayStation)
- Chaos Break (PlayStation)
- Formula Nippon (PlayStation)
- K-1 Grand Prix (PlayStation, 2000)
- Wild Rapids (PlayStation, 1994)
- OverBlood 2 (PlayStation, 2001)
