= Rod Humble =

American video game designer (born 1966)

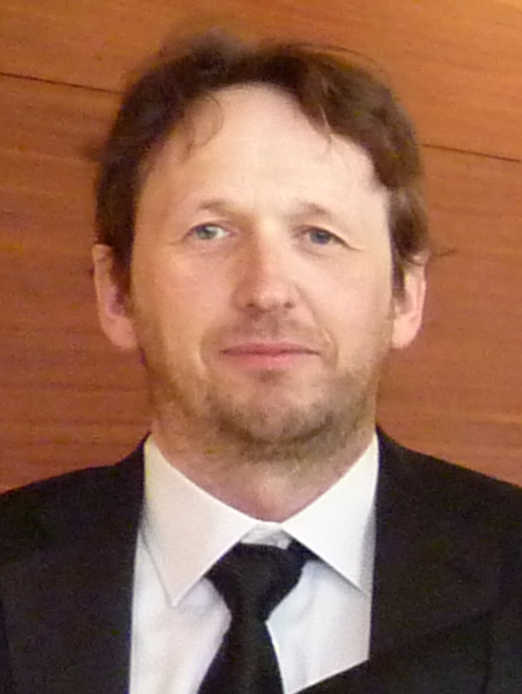
- Humble in 2011
- Born: 1 June 1966 (age 60); Loughborough, England
- Occupations: Video game designer, general manager

Rodvik Humble (born June 1, 1966) is a British video game designer. He is the former chief executive officer of Second Life developer Linden Lab, Chief Creative Officer at ToyTalk, and former executive vice president for the EA Play label of the video game company Electronic Arts. He is the general manager for the Berkeley studio of Paradox Interactive. He has been contributing to the development of games since 1990, and is best known for his work on the Electronic Arts titles, The Sims 2 and The Sims 3. Previously, he worked at Sony Online where he worked on EverQuest and before that Virgin Interactive's SubSpace.

== Biography ==
Humble was born on June 1, 1966, in Loughborough, England. The son of an English mother and an Irish father, Humble moved to the US when he was around 27 years old.

Humble has developed experimental games including The Marriage, Stars Over Half Moon Bay and Last Thoughts of the Aurochs. His work was shown and played at the SFMOMA in 2016.

On 7 October 2008, a press release noted that Electronic Arts had promoted Humble to Executive Vice President and Head of The Sims Label of EA. In this role, Humble was to be responsible for The Sims Label, the developer and marketer of life-simulation games and online communities with an emphasis on creativity, community and humor. A non-player character in The Sims 2 expansion pack, FreeTime, is based on Humble. He is seen delivering a gift to new home-owners, the gift always being a computer, the computer having a sneak preview of The Sims 3.

On 23 December 2010, Linden Lab, the creators and operators of the virtual world Second Life, announced that he would become their new CEO as of January 2011. On 24 January 2014, Humble announced on his Facebook account that he would be leaving Linden Lab to pursue founding a new company that will "make art, entertainment and unusual things!". On 29 January 2015, Humble announced his latest solo project Cults & Daggers, with his new company Chaphat.

Paradox Interactive announced that Humble would lead its new internal studio, Paradox Tectonic, located in Berkeley, California, starting in March 2019. On March 6, 2023, Paradox Interactive teased Life by You with Rod leading the studio. On 17 June 2024, a forum post from Paradox Interactive deputy CEO Mattias Lilja announced that Life by You had been cancelled.
