= Galaxy of Pen & Paper =

2017 video game

- Developer: Behold Studios
- Publishers: Dear Villagers; Paradox Interactive
- Platforms: Android; iOS; Linux; macOS; Windows; PlayStation 4; Nintendo Switch; Xbox One
- Release: PC, iOS, Android; WW: July 27, 2017; PlayStation 4; WW: April 7, 2020; Nintendo Switch, Xbox One; WW: April 8, 2020
- Genre: Role-playing
- Mode: Single-player

Galaxy of Pen & Paper is a role-playing video game developed by Behold Studios and published by Plug In Digital and Paradox Interactive. It is a follow-up to Knights of Pen & Paper.

== Gameplay ==
Players control a group of friends who are playing a tabletop science fiction role-playing game. The stories and friends make many pop culture references to science fiction franchises and authors. The in-game characters can perform side quests, fight turn-based battles against enemies, and engage in ship battles. It mixes retro pixel art and 3D graphics.

== Development ==
Developer Behold Studios is based in Brasília, Brazil. Paradox Interactive released Galaxy of Pen & Paper for Linux, macOS, Windows, iOS, and Android on July 27, 2017. A content update and bugfix, titled the +1 Edition, was released in November 2018. Dear Villagers released it for PlayStation 4 on April 7 and for Xbox One and Nintendo Switch on April 8, 2020.

== Reception ==
On Metacritic, Galaxy of Pen & Paper received mixed reviews for Windows and positive reviews for iOS. RPGamer said the turn-based combat is nothing special, but they enjoyed the spaceship combat. RPGFan said it has charming moments but is a missed opportunity because players never learn anything about the in-game friends who are playing the game. Pocket Gamer enjoyed the humor, pop culture references, and gameplay. They called it "brilliant, entertaining, wonderfully balanced". Gamezebo said it was not as good as Knights of Pen & Paper' but was still fun. Though they encountered some bugs, they felt the humor was fresher than the fantasy-based Knights.
