= Legion Arena =

2005 video game

- Developer: Slitherine Strategies
- Publishers: EU: Black Bean Games; NA: Strategy First; Freeverse Software (Mac)
- Platforms: Windows, Mac OS X
- Release: EU: November 11, 2005; NA: December 21, 2005; Mac OS X: NA: June 30, 2006
- Genre: Computer wargame
- Modes: Single player, multiplayer

Legion Arena is a computer wargame developed by Slitherine Strategies. It allows the player to play as several tribes during the rise of the Roman Empire. The player can play as the Latin tribes, the Celts and the Romans. It is published by Black Bean Games in Europe and Strategy First in North America for Windows.

== Release ==
The game was announced on June 30, 2004. A OS X port by Freeverse was announced on January 12, 2006. In 2006, an expansion to Legion Arena was released under the title of Legion Arena: Cult of Mithras. It incorporated mythical elements into the base game.

== Reception ==
Reception

Aggregate scores
Aggregator	Score
GameRankings	68.23%
Metacritic	66/100

Review scores
Publication	Score
G4	3/5
GameSpot	6.9/10
GameZone	8/10

Legion Arena received mixed reviews from critics upon release. On Metacritic, the game holds a score of 65/100 based on 20 reviews, indicating "mixed or average reviews". On GameRankings, the game holds a score of 68.23% based on 22 reviews.

== See also ==
- Legion
