= Airfix Dogfighter =

2000 flight-combat video game

- North American cover
- Developers: Unique Development Studios; Paradox Entertainment
- Publishers: SWE: Vision Park; WW: EON Digital Entertainment
- Designer: Daniel Nygren
- Artist: Peter R. Andersson
- Platform: Microsoft Windows
- Release: UK: November 3, 2000; NA: December 13, 2000
- Genres: Action, vehicular combat
- Modes: Single-player, multiplayer

Airfix Dogfighter is a flight-combat video game for Microsoft Windows; developed by Unique Development Studios and Paradox Entertainment, published by EON Digital Entertainment, it was released in late 2000 in North America and Europe. 15 planes are at the players' disposal to re-enact World War II in a 1950s home.

The game is based on the Airfix brand of plastic models. Airfix Dogfighter lets players pilot detailed, miniature versions of World War II aircraft through a large, 3D-rendered house. The players can fly for the Allies or the Axis powers, each with a home base in a different room of the house. Dogfights take place in the yard or throughout a house full of curios, knick-knacks, canisters, and decorations, many of which can be destroyed and which contain special power-ups.

== Gameplay ==
=== Weaponry ===
The Airfix Dogfighter engine supports 9 different weapons, 4 of which will become stronger as the player unlocks tech bonuses. The machine gun, cannon, rocket, and bomb weapons are available to both sides and can be upgraded through 5 different tech levels. Each side has two unique weapons in the single player campaign; the Axis can use homing rockets and a "particle beam" laser, but the Allied forces can use floating "paramines" and a Tesla coil capable of shocking multiple units. Lastly, both forces unlock an atomic bomb in the final campaign mission for their side. All of the special weapons start at the highest tech level and are unaffected by bonuses.

=== Bonuses ===
Players have 5 tech levels. They start with the first one, which is the simplest, but can acquire stars or crosses (stars for allies, crosses for axis), which are found in destroyed enemies or breakables (items in the surrounding environment that players can destroy). 10 stars upgrade players to the second level, 10 more for third level, 11 stars to the next, and 10 more to get to the final level, which makes destruction of most enemies easy.

=== Enemy Units ===
In the campaign, players fight some of the most popular tank designs in World War II, including the Churchill, Tiger Tank, and Sherman. Other units such as battleships, U-boats and personnel carriers are also included.

=== Territory ===
For most rooms, players must have a key to get in, which will be revealed depending on the mission. Unless otherwise specified, players cannot go upstairs in Axis or downstairs in Allies, or their airplanes will come under fire from powerful enemy anti-air defense batteries. At the end of the Allied Campaign, players can go wherever they want in the house.

=== Storyline ===
The game's plot is based on the invasion of Britain.

=== Multiplayer ===
In multiplayer, players can have their own insignia and aircraft. Players also can choose a campaign map or a map created in the editor. Players can also make special practice maps for themselves and can create buildings.

=== Editor ===
The editor is where players can create their own maps, choosing from a variety of pre-made rooms and objects.

== Reception ==
Reception

Aggregate score
Aggregator	Score
Metacritic	75/100

Review scores
Publication	Score
Computer Games Strategy Plus	2.5/5
Computer Gaming World	3.5/5
Eurogamer	8/10
GameSpot	7.3/10
GameZone	9.5/10
IGN	8/10
PC Gamer (US)	79%
PC Zone	59%

The game received "generally favorable reviews" according to the review aggregation website Metacritic.

== See also ==
- Wargame (video games)
- List of Paradox Interactive games
- List of PC games
