= Knights of Pen & Paper 2 =

2015 role-playing video game

- Developer: Kyy Games
- Publisher: Paradox Interactive
- Platforms: iOS, Android, Windows, OS X, Linux, PlayStation 4, Nintendo Switch, Xbox One
- Release: May 13, 2015: iOS, Android May 13, 2015 Windows, OS X, Linux October 20, 2015 PlayStation 4; PAL: December 11, 2018; NA: December 12, 2018 Nintendo Switch December 13, 2018 Xbox One December 14, 2018
- Genre: RPG
- Mode: Single-player

Knights of Pen & Paper 2, stylized as Knights of Pen & Paper II, is a role-playing video game developed by Kyy Games and published by Paradox Interactive. It was released on May 13, 2015, for iOS and Android, and on October 20, 2015, for Windows, OS X and Linux through the download service Steam. Versions for PlayStation 4, Nintendo Switch, and Xbox One were released in December 2018 under the name Knights of Pen & Paper 2: Deluxiest Edition. It is the sequel to Knights of Pen & Paper.

The game received mixed reviews from critics, who praised the art and overall improvements to the gameplay and story, but criticized it for being overly similar to the first game in the series, using the same music, and being shorter and easier than that entry.

== Gameplay ==
The gameplay of Knights of Pen & Paper 2 is similar to the first game in the series. It is a turn-based RPG in which the player controls a group of role-playing game players during a Dungeons & Dragons-style game session, as well as their Dungeon Master. The gameplay was streamlined from the first game, requiring less grinding, but is also less difficult overall.

== Development ==
The studio Kyy Games took over from the original developers, Behold Studios, due to the latter being too busy developing Chroma Squad.

== Reception ==
Reception

Aggregate score
Aggregator	Score
Metacritic	(iOS) 71/100; 67/100

Review scores
Publication	Score
Destructoid	(iOS) 7.5/10
GamesMaster	(iOS) 56%
Gamezebo	(iOS) 4/5
IGN	(iOS) 7.8/10
Pocket Gamer	(iOS) 4/5
RPGamer	(PC) 3.5/5
TouchArcade	(iOS) 3.5/5
VentureBeat	(PC) 60/100
The Escapist	(PC) 4/5

The game received "average" reviews on all platforms according to the review aggregation website Metacritic. Sam Wachter of RPGamer called the PC version more accessible than the original, with improved gameplay, and praised the 16-bit style graphics. Wachter criticized the amount that was recycled from the first game. Shaun Musgrave of TouchArcade said that the iOS version "feels less complete than its predecessor", and criticized it for being shorter and easier, despite complementing its improved presentation and better spelling and grammar in story sections.
