= Ageod's Wars of Succession =

2018 video game

Wars of Succession
- Developer: AGEod
- Publisher: Slitherine Ltd
- Engine: AGE
- Platform: Microsoft Windows
- Release: Jan 25, 2018
- Genre: Turn-based grand strategy
- Modes: Single-player, multiplayer

Ageod's Wars of Succession is a strategy wargame that covers the War of Spanish Succession (1701–1713) and Great Northern War (1700–1721).

The game was released on Jan 25, 2018, being developed by French company AGEOD and published by Slitherine Ltd.

Covering all Europe, from the Atlantic to Russia, and from Southern Spain to Scandinavia, the map has over 5,000 different regions.

== Gameplay ==
In Wars of Succession the player is tasked with leading the armies of the nations involved in the two major wars, managing logistics, production, attrition, battlefield tactics, naval warfare. The game includes numerous historical leaders, including Charles XII of Sweden, John Churchill, Duke of Marlborough, Prince Eugene of Savoy or admiral George Rooke.

Furthermore, the game portrays hundreds of various historical units, from regular infantry to Winged Husssars, life guard units and various mercenary troops, as well as ships, ranging from small riverine boats to huge ships of the line.

Wars of Succession has five separate scenarios, of which one covers the entire Great Northern War, while the other four deal with the War of Spanish Succession.

== Critical reviews ==
The game received positive reviews from several reviewers, praising its historical accuracy. The editors from the Big Boss Battle gaming news website wrote: "The ease of movement, army structuring and information access makes an exceptionally deep strategy game immediately accessible". At the same time, the editor of the gaming blog A Wargamers Needful Things wrote that "the game is meat and potatoes for a wargamer and the AGE engine; even if it is long in the tooth, it still gives the wargamer a great experience". Italian website SpazioGames notes that "Wars of Succession is a real turn based strategy game, but it has some technical problems" and gave it a score of 65.
