= Landmaker =

1998 video game

Landmaker Builder's Block
- European game cover
- Developer: Taito
- Publishers: JP: Taito; NA: Jaleco; EU: Eon Digital Entertainment
- Platforms: Arcade, PlayStation, PlayStation Network
- Release: Arcade: JP: June 1, 1998; EU: 1998; AS: 1998; PlayStation: JP: December 9, 1999; NA: July 12, 2000; EU: September 30, 2000; PlayStation Network: JP: November 12, 2008
- Genre: Puzzle
- Modes: Single-player, multiplayer
- Arcade system: Taito F3 System

Landmaker (ランドメーカー, Randomēkā) is an isometric arcade puzzle video game developed and released by Taito in 1998. It is a versus action puzzle game similar in appearance to Taito's own Puzzle Bobble, though it plays more similarly to Puyo Puyo or Baku Baku Animal. The arcade version was released only in Japan, though a prototype for a worldwide release exists.

The game was ported to the PlayStation in 1999, featuring a completely new set of modes using 3D graphics. This version was later released in North America by Jaleco as Builder's Block, and then in Europe by Eon Digital Entertainment. More recently, this version was distributed through the PlayStation Network in Japan by Square Enix.

== Gameplay ==
Arcade screenshot

This original arcade version uses 2D graphics from an isometric perspective and is entirely versus-based. Players choose from eight to ten playable characters, each with a unique stage and damage effect:

- Hiryu (飛劉): a red-skinned man who uses fire
- Aifa (愛華): a young girl who uses plants
- Soumei (蒼瞑): a pale man who uses ice
- Renki (錬奇): a purple-skinned, zombie-like man who seems to use mud
- Youen (踊燕): a male (Japanese versions) or female (other versions) musician who uses sound (flute)
- Kouko (候虎): a muscular man who uses rock
- Rinrei (櫚鈴): a blue-haired woman who uses steel (swords)
- Roushinshi (楼蜃子): an elegant-looking man who uses lightning; he is accompanied by an unnamed young boy, most likely his apprentice
- Ranju (蘭嬬): the first boss character, uses raw power (?). When defeated, turns into Gaira. Playable with a code.
- Gaira (鎧羅): also known as "Devil-Gaira", the second and final boss character, uses raw power (?). Playable with a code.

== Ports ==
In addition to an accurate port of the arcade version ("Arcade Mode"), the PlayStation version also contains new single player ("Puzzle Mode") and multiplayer ("Battle Mode") modes, using 3D graphics. Gameplay is somewhat similar to the arcade version and even uses the same basic rules, but these two modes have nothing else in common with the arcade version.

== Reception ==
In Japan, Game Machine listed Landmaker on their October 1, 1998 issue as being the fourteenth most-successful arcade game of the month.
