= Knights of Pen & Paper =

2012 role-playing video game

- Developer: Behold Studios
- Publishers: Paradox Interactive, Seaven Studio
- Platforms: iOS, Android, Windows, OS X, Linux, Nintendo Switch, PlayStation 4, Xbox One
- Release: iOS, Android; October 30, 2012; Windows, OS X, Linux; June 18, 2013; Nintendo Switch, PlayStation 4 May 29, 2018; Xbox One; May 30, 2018
- Genre: Role-playing game

Knights of Pen & Paper is a role-playing video game developed by Behold Studios and published by Paradox Interactive and Seaven Studio. It was released on October 30, 2012, for iOS and Android, and on June 18, 2013, for Windows, OS X and Linux (the latter under the name Knights of Pen & Paper: +1 Edition). A Nintendo Switch version, entitled Knights of Pen & Paper: +1 Deluxier Edition, was released on May 29, 2018, in North America and Europe and on November 21, 2019, in Japan. Similar versions for PlayStation 4 and Xbox One were released on May 29 and May 30, 2018, respectively.

== Gameplay ==
Knights of Pen & Paper is a turn-based RPG with the twist that the game itself exists in the imaginations of a group of Dungeons & Dragons-style role-playing game players, who are also shown. The player can control not only the players of the in-universe game, but also the Dungeon Master, allowing them to choose which battles to fight. The table upon which the in-universe game is being played is also a constant presence.

Sometimes the role-players will break character and talk amongst themselves informally. The game contains many references to 16-bit RPGs.

== Reception ==
Reception

Aggregate score
Aggregator	Score
Metacritic	(iOS) 83/100 (NS) 80/100 (PC) 62/100

Review scores
Publication	Score
Eurogamer	(iOS) 9/10
Gamezebo	4.5/5

The iOS and Switch versions received "favorable" reviews, while the PC version received "mixed or average reviews", according to the review aggregation website Metacritic.

Rich Stanton of Eurogamer called the iOS version a "rare case" in which such an "offbeat premise" is "executed with such winning aplomb that you can't help but be sucked in", and said that it made him interested in the real Dungeons & Dragons. Nick Tywalk of Gamezebo called it a "send up and tribute to old-school RPGs", with "witty writing".

== Sequels ==
The game received a sequel called Knights of Pen & Paper 2, which was developed by Kyy Games and released in 2015.

Galaxy of Pen & Paper, a table-top RPG based on science fiction rather than swords and sorcery, which was developed by Behold Studios once again, and released in 2017.

Knights of Pen & Paper 3 was released in March 2023.
