= K-1 Grand Prix =

1998 video game

- Developer: Daft
- Publishers: JP: Xing Entertainment; NA: Jaleco; EU: Eon Digital Entertainment
- Series: K-1 Fighting
- Platform: PlayStation
- Release: JP: November 26, 1998; NA: January 25, 2000; EU: 2000
- Genres: Sports, fighting
- Modes: Single-player, multiplayer

K-1 Grand Prix, known in Japan as Fighting Illusion: K-1 Grand Prix '98, is a video game based on the K-1 martial arts organization in Hong Kong and the K-1 World Grand Prix, developed by Daft and published by Xing Entertainment in Japan in 1998, and by Jaleco and Eon Digital Entertainment in 2000, both for PlayStation. It is the sixth game in the K-1 Fighting series.

== Reception ==
Reception

Aggregate score
Aggregator	Score
GameRankings	56%

Review scores
Publication	Score
Famitsu	27/40
Game Informer	5.5/10
GameFan	79% (Note: In GameFan's viewpoint of the game, one critic gave it 76, and the other 81.)
GameSpot	3.1/10
IGN	3/10
Official U.S. PlayStation Magazine	3.5/5
PlayStation: The Official Magazine	3/5

The game received mixed reviews according to the review aggregation website GameRankings. In Japan, Famitsu gave it a score of 27 out of 40.
