= The Marriage (video game) =

2006 video game

- Designer: Rod Humble
- Platform: Microsoft Windows
- Release: March 2007
- Genre: Art game
- Mode: Single-player

The Marriage is an experimental art game created by Rod Humble and released for Microsoft Windows in March 2007. Humble set out to explore the forms of artistic expression unique to video games, leading him to express his feelings associated with marriage by relying primarily on game mechanics rather than on traditional storytelling, audio, or video elements. The game uses only simple colored shapes that the player interacts with using a mouse. The player's actions cause pink and blue squares to increase or decrease in both size and opacity, representing the balance of personal needs in a relationship.

The game received praise for its innovative concept and design, as well as criticism for its heavy reliance on Humble's accompanying written explanations, and for its depiction of simplistic gender roles. As a game that self-consciously embraces its medium, it attracted attention from fellow game designers and games studies scholars, who have used it to develop concepts like the relationship between art and games or between simulation and metaphor. It is credited with beginning a movement of games designed with a focus on creating meaning through game mechanics.

== Gameplay ==
By combining heavily constrained mechanisms for interaction and control with abstract visuals, The Marriage encourages experimentation and meaning-making based on kinds of engagement and interpretation. The game's instructions suggest playing it first, before reading the detailed description of its mechanics and intended meanings.

The player interacts using only mouse movement, hovering over abstract shapes. The player's actions or inaction enlarge or shrink pink and blue squares, increase or decrease their opacity, and move them towards or away from each other. Placing the cursor over either of the squares causes the blue square to shrink, and for the squares to move towards each other. Moving the cursor over a circle makes the circle disappear, while at the same time reducing the size of the pink square. If the two squares "kiss" by touching edges, the sizes and transparency are affected inversely: the blue square shrinks and becomes more transparent; the pink square grows and becomes more opaque. When the blue square comes in contact with circles of any color other than black, it grows and becomes more opaque. When the pink square comes in contact with circles of any color other than black, it grows but transparency does not change. When either square collides with a black circle, its size decreases. As squares collide with each other or with circles, a light bar at the bottom of the screen grows in size. Over time, the pink square steadily increases its transparency unless counteracted by touching edges with the blue square.

The game ends when either the blue or pink square becomes too small or too transparent. To sustain the existence of both squares, the player must balance activities which increase the size and opacity of each. Humble intended this to convey the complexities of balancing the sometimes conflicting needs of partners in a marriage. The background color changes as the game progresses, eventually arriving at a fireworks display on a black background if the player is able to sustain a balance.

== Background and intent ==
"The challenge as I saw it was to have the primary medium of expression something unique to games. So it couldn't be a story for example, because stories can be told by other mediums. It couldn't be a poem or sounds because they also have other counterparts. In other words I didn't want to limit games to being a hybrid art form. [...] I wanted something that was not easily representable by other media. I wanted to use game rules to explain something invisible but real."

Humble is a video game industry veteran, known for his roles in the development of several successful games, including EverQuest, The Sims, and Second Life, though his independent work is noted for its experimentation. The Marriage is his second attempt at a game which derives personal meaning primarily through mechanics rather than audio, video, or other traditional storytelling, following A Walk With Max and preceding Stars Over Half Moon Bay. The Marriage is comparatively and intentionally more abstract than its predecessor to further restrict the role played by more traditional audio, video, and storytelling elements.

The core ideas behind The Marriage began while Humble was on a trip to Carmel, California, with his wife, and was developed over the weeks that followed through a process he described as "like carving with the grain of the wood or painting with the brushstrokes rather than against them."

Humble understood and embraced that someone would not be able to understand the meaning of the game simply by looking at it, instead requiring explanation and active engagement, taking meaning from the mechanics rather than strictly visual symbolism. The two prominent squares represent the partners in the marriage, while the circles are external variables that affect the squares in different ways. The size of the squares refer to the "size" of a person, or their personality, in a relationship.

Following its first public showcase at the 2007 Game Developers Conference, the game was released as freeware in March 2007. According to Humble, total development time of the game was "one evening, plus a few months of debugging".

== Interpretation and analysis ==
The Marriage has been the subject of analysis in both video game journalism and academic research. Writers took interest in its main conceit as a game that embraces its medium by trying to remove traces of all others, and saw that reduction as an opportunity for scholars researching video games and procedurality. Games studies scholar Ian Bogost categorized The Marriage as a "proceduralist game," which "rely primarily on computational rules to produce their artistic meaning." Game designer Christopher Fidalgo wrote that it could be considered "a testament to the artistic potential of games on their own grounds". Bogost compared it to Braid and Passage, games which share several properties: "procedural rhetoric, introspection, abstraction, subjective representation, and strong authorship." Games researcher Theresa Claire Devine used The Marriage as a case study to develop her methodology evaluating the role of Art (in the sense of high art, opposed to low art) in games. Applying a multi-part algorithm to various aspects of the game, she concluded that it could be considered a "Game," as opposed to a "game," using parallel capitalization to indicate a "high" versus "low" distinction.

Designer Jason Begy used The Marriage to flesh out his definition of an "abstract game," looking at the way the game's objects operate as "sign[s] in the game's fiction" while at the same time lacking "relation between their form and their function." Media studies lecturer Sebastian Moring expanded on the role of abstraction by putting The Marriage at the center of a common dichotomy in video game studies, between simulation and metaphor. He took issue with the majority of scholars who wrote about the game and called it metaphorical, arguing that while it is tempting to consider The Marriage metaphorical simply because of its abstraction, lacking the audiovisual clues that a simulation would typically have, it is more accurate to think of it as a simulation. It is not a "mimetic simulation" like The Sims 3, but "a low fidelity simulation ... because of its very abstract semiotics as well as the few implementations of possible love relationship activities in the game mechanics." Starting with Humble's statement that the game is intended to be an expression of "how marriage feels," Game Development professor Doris Rusch wrote that she found the gameplay too far abstracted from a relationship such that it "does not actually model the experience of being in a relationship, but depicts from an outsider's view the reflection process about its mechanisms." According to Moring, however, what is simulated is not "love-related activities [or] an individual experience of love [but] a metaphorically structured concept of love."

In an interview, Humble commented that the most common criticism he received was that the documentation he provided to explain the game was too detailed, though he did not regret including it because he felt it was important to communicate his intention. Rusch wrote about the limitations of playing the game without the explanation, saying that it "illustrates that the power of procedural expression to teach us something about the human condition hinges on cognitive comprehension of what the game is about and what its various elements stand for." Without the explanation, she argues, any significance a player would take away from their experience with the game would be due to their own creativity rather than to meaning built into the game, as the mechanics of mousing over abstract shapes are too far removed from the concepts they signify.

== Reception and influence ==
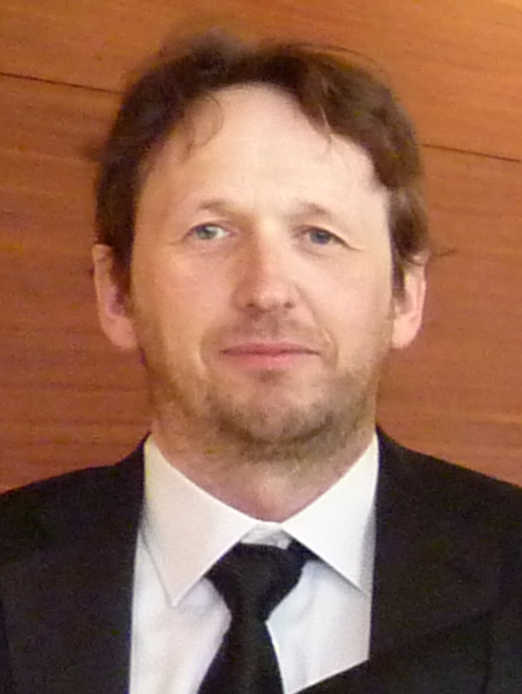
The Marriage creator Rod Humble in 2011

Engadget described the game's critical response as "enormous", noting the attention it received from both inside and outside the video game world. It has received praise for its innovation, effective expression, and impact on its players. Several reviewers commented on its value as art and the extent to which it generated discussion and reflection. For art game designer Jason Rohrer, "The game, and my experience discussing it, have reminded me of experiences at galleries of modern art."

Writing for MTV, Stephen Totilo expressed that the difficulty he encountered in playing the game and his inability to beat it actually generated anxiety about his own relationship. Humble told IGN he wanted to avoid player failure but explained that while he tries to subvert traditional elements of video games, in practice doing so is challenging: "you discover quickly why they are used too much, they are very useful tools which get you out of tricky design situations all the time."

Some reviewers have been critical of what they perceive as Humble's depiction of stereotypical or simplistic gender roles. Totilo said he was "left assuming that Humble thought it was husbands who benefited from engaging in stuff (and people?) besides a wife, whereas the wife only benefited from contact with the husband". According to Humble, though he intended to allow for a great deal of interpretation, this was not a message he intended. Rather, "the central point [is] that if both needs were not satisfied, the Marriage dies. In other words, love is satisfying different needs. For myself, I do need 'alone time' as well as 'together time,' but not one exclusively, and the game's rules were a way of exploring that." Edward Picot called the game "poetic" but also expressed concern about the game's "stereotypical view of the sexes" which he notes are particularly apparent through the use of blue and pink for the squares. At the Foundations of Digital Games conference, Treanor, et al. presented a paper that argued the pink and blue colors Humble chose for the squares subverted his intention to rely entirely on mechanics for meaning, due to the gender-related connotations those colors cause.

Others criticized the premise, arguing against reducing the complexities and ambiguities of human experience in order to correspond to simplified representation and a fixed model of interaction. From these criticisms and other interpretations, Humble said he learned an important lesson: "that the first mechanics you show define everything that follows, the power of that initial impact between the two squares and your reaction to it defines how you look at the rest of the game. It didn't realize this before and it's instructive going forward."

Treanor, et al. credit Humble's approach with helping "to inspire a proceduralist movement of game designers". The Marriage also more directly inspired two games by designers Petri Purho and Brett Douville. Purho, who called it "the most interesting game presented" at the 2007 Experimental Gameplay Workshop, created The Divorce as an April Fools' Day clone of Pong with a similar artistic explanation. Douville's My Divorce is a wholly new game utilizing similar aesthetics and tone.
