= Majesty 2: The Fantasy Kingdom Sim =

2009 video game

- Developer: 1C:Ino-Co
- Publishers: 1C, Paradox Interactive
- Composer: Andreas Waldetoft
- Platforms: Windows, Mac OS X
- Release: September 18, 2009 (Windows); December 2, 2010 (Mac)
- Genre: Real-time strategy
- Modes: Single-player, Multiplayer

Majesty 2: The Fantasy Kingdom Sim is a real-time strategy game developed by 1C:Ino-Co and published by Paradox Interactive. The game was released on September 18, 2009. It is a sequel to Cyberlore's Majesty: The Fantasy Kingdom Sim.

A Mac OS X version of Majesty 2 was announced by Virtual Programming on August 13, 2010. Virtual Programming published the Mac OS X version of the game on November 16, 2010. The publisher released the Mac OS X versions of the first two expansion packs, Kingmaker and Battles of Ardania, on December 15, 2010. In January, 2011, Virtual Programming published the third expansion, Monster Kingdom, for Mac OS X. In April, 2011, Paradox published a collection of the three expansions plus Majesty 2, titled "Majesty 2 Collection", for PC.

== Gameplay ==
Majesty 2 features 3D graphics, unlike 2D graphics of the previous game.

The core gameplay of Majesty 2 is essentially the same as the original Majesty. Players take the role of "the sovereign", placing buildings and recruiting units as in other real-time strategy titles. Individual units ("heroes"), however, are semi-autonomous; each has their own statistics and inventory and interact with the game world according to unit-specific AIs (for example hunters will scout unknown areas of the map while warriors prefer to attack or defend locations). The player can influence the actions of hero units by placing bounties on particular actions, such as exploring an area or defeating a specific enemy unit, using a variety of "flags". They also supply heroes with equipment and other items via trade buildings, which both improves the hero's abilities and allows the player to recoup the money heroes have gained from flags and defeated enemies.

=== Multiplayer ===
Unlike the original, Majesty 2 does not feature freestyle play nor co-operative multi-player as part of its release offering. Because the new engine does not provide the technical capability to randomly generate maps it is unlikely that a freestyle game mode, of the sort found in the original game, will be provided. However, patch 1.3 introduced randomized non-quest monster dens, and places for construction of temples and trading posts. The patch also included a map editor.

== Plot ==
Majesty 2 returns to the gently satirical, high fantasy world of Ardania featured in the original, a magical realm populated by elves, gnomes, dwarves and various monsters, as well as humans.

According to the game's back story, Ardania was unified 500 years previously by a great ruler. Since that time, many celebrated kings ruled, who vanquished many legendary foes. The last king, Leonard, however, had no enemies left to conquer, and became worried over his place in history. He summoned a powerful demon in an attempt to banish it and win renown himself, but the demon killed the king and usurped his throne. Under the demon's rule, Ardania crumbled and fell back to its chaotic past, and many pretenders tried and failed to win the throne. The player assumes the role of the "true heir" to Ardania, who sets out to defeat the demon and purge the realm of evil.

== Expansions ==
The first expansion pack named Majesty 2: Kingmaker was released on March 26, 2010 for PC and on December 15, 2010 for Mac OS X. The story revolved around his majesty battling the evil Grum-Gog, lord of pestilence, and God of Goblins. It introduced a randomized map feature that will move the enemy den and trading posts to different locations, and a map generator for custom scenarios.

A second expansion pack named Battles Of Ardania was released on November 10, 2010 for PC and on December 15, 2010 for Mac OS X.

A third expansion pack named Monster Kingdom was released on January 11, 2011 for PC and in mid-January, 2011 for Mac OS X.

A collection of the three expansion packs plus Majesty 2, named "Majesty 2 Collection", was released by Paradox on April 19, 2011 for PC.

An unofficial expansion pack named Cold Sunrise was released on November 16, 2011 for PC.

== Reception ==
Reception

Aggregate scores
Aggregator	Score
GameRankings	75.85
Metacritic	72

Review scores
Publication	Score
Game Informer	8/10
GameSpot	3/5
IGN	7.5/10

Majesty 2 received mixed to mostly positive reviews, with a Metacritic average of 72%, and scores ranging from 50% to 88%.

IncGamers enjoyed the game, saying it was "lots of fun, remains true to the original and has some great new features." They only bemoaned the "lack of [a] freestyle mode."

IT Reviews said that "there's some initial enjoyment to be garnered here, [but] developing your heroes and coaxing them around soon starts to feel like a chore. The missions become repetitive, despite the constant drip-feed of new buildings and heroes, and we found the whole experience less than Majestic in the end."

PC Gamer magazine in the UK agreed, stating that Majesty 2 is "an intriguing spanner in the strategy game works, but one that causes too many malfunctions to justify its existence."

GameSpot critiques it, citing "Repetitive, formulaic missions" giving it a 6.5 out of 10.

== Sequels ==
A sequel stand alone game, Defenders of Ardania, was released on March 14 of 2012. The gameplay is very different from either of its predecessors, having switched genres to tower defense/offense.
