= Risk: Global Domination =

2003 video game

- Developer: Cyberlore Studios
- Publisher: Atari Interactive
- Engine: RenderWare
- Platform: PlayStation 2
- Release: NA: November 04, 2003; PAL: July 9, 2004
- Genres: Board game Turn-based strategy
- Modes: Single-player, multiplayer

Risk: Global Domination is a video game for the PlayStation 2, based upon the board game Risk, developed by Cyberlore Studios and published by Atari Interactive. It was released in 2003. Xbox and GameCube versions were planned, but cancelled.

== Gameplay ==
The game follows the board game. It can be played in three different forms: Classic, Secret Mission and Capital. Online play was also supported for up to 20 players.

In Risk: Global Domination, the player tries to win a game by controlling all 42 territories (Classic), controlling every capital (Capital), or completing a given secret mission objective (Secret Mission). There are a total of eleven AI opponents, referred to as Generals, based on historical military leaders and statesmen, such as Catherine the Great and Pangeran Diponegoro. With each game played, the player can accomplish certain tasks to acquire medals, with the tasks ranging from capturing a specific number of continents to winning a game against five AI opponents using a particular game rule configuration. Most of these medals also unlock a wide variety of extras, such as dice designs and troop uniforms.

== Reception ==
The game received "mixed or average reviews" from critics, according to Metacritic.
