= Lost Empire =

- Developer(s): Pollux Gamelabs
- Publisher(s): Paradox Interactive
- Designer(s): Flemming Pedersen
- Platform(s): Microsoft Windows
- Release: 14 June 2007
- Genre(s): 4X, turn-based strategy
- Mode(s): Single-player, multiplayer

Lost Empire is a 4X turn-based strategy video game developed by Pollux Gamelabs and released in June 2007.

== Synopsis ==
The game is set in the year 4620. There are seven major civilizations in space, humankind being one of them. The story is that an attack led by an unknown evil alien race has almost destroyed the seven civilizations, and they are therefore now trying to expand furthest in order to ensure their continued survival. However, a powerful character with devious motives known as Enais is interfering with the seven civilizations and their expansion plans.

You play the leader of one of the seven civilizations and must bring this civilization to victory by dominating the galaxy. It is possible to achieve victory through military domination, diplomacy, research, culture, or by killing the character Enais.

The game was released June 14, 2007 and quickly went to the top of the charts on the Paradox Interactive homepage. It featured 7 major races, 45 minor races, a huge tech tree, 3D battles, a very large galaxy with 5000 solar systems, and a special dragon-like race called the Chi Lung, which the player can choose to play. The game is mod-able with the possibility to tweak and change science descriptions, their effects, races, artwork, all text, and more. Lost Empire was nominated "Best Game of the Year" in 2006 at the D3Expo.

== Civilizations ==
- Humans: A race of stubbornness and self-righteousness, qualities which have made them one of the toughest races in the galaxy. Humans are good at everything but excel in nothing. The mad Goddess Enais left the humans in the dark after failing to convert them to her ways. However, she is always watching them...
- Tritons: Once proud and lazy, the Tritons had only managed to build a few drones when they were attacked by the mad Goddess Enais. They have learned the hard way that having the weakest firepower in battle is a costly thing. Now, they are one of the most ambitious races. Never again will they be attacked unprepared.
- Horde: Though not excelling individually, the sheer numbers of the Horde make them a formidable fighting force. The Horde has found that even though battles are lost, there are always plenty of fighting force left among the surviving masses, and so they always come back for more. Several now extinct races witnessed this ruthless perseverance of the Horde as it sealed their fate.
- Chi Lung: Enormous dragonbeings which evolved and prospered by devouring their home planet animals. When they figured out that they could actually leave their home planet and explore the galaxy on their own, many worlds came to suffer as the fearsome hungry beasts took what they needed to survive. Chi Lung never invented the wheel but who needs a wheel when you fly? Instead they evolved via mental training.
- Megalanians: These aristocratic beings constitute a highly intelligent scientific oriented race. Although suffering from mild megalomania they tend to be peaceful when they get their way. They consider themselves the most superior race in the Universe, since the evil goddess Enais cannot be considered a whole race.
- Crystal Spirits: These elusive creatures are quite evolved mentally and have become very adept at controlling the advanced computer systems they steal from other races. Even though they are only capable of taking physical form inside crystals, their superior knowledge of their native state highly increases their production rate and survivability. Their vast knowledge of computers also grants them a certain reputation in battle.
- Alkiths: Tall, secretive, and mystical, the Alkith race likes to keep out of sight until the right moment when they strike with extreme almost magical power. Alkiths were once the pawns of Enais, but have recently broken free and now seek revenge searching the Path of Enais relentlessly. Most races believe the Alkith have some form of secret weapon they have inherited from Enais.
- Enais: The information in this report is sketchy at best, and is a collection of our current available information on the creature known as Enais. Species: Unknown. Technological level: Probably beyond anything known. Enais is a creature which is deeply interwoven in the story line of Lost Empire. The player will find traces of her, and maybe even encounter her while playing. She is quite hostile, and very, very technologically advanced. The player might acquire her technology and use it to win the game. The player has to colonize all ten planets leading to Enais’ hideout in order to do this. However, it is very likely that Enais will attack any that threaten to steal her advanced technologies.

== Remake ==
A follow-up on this title called Lost Empire: Immortals, a revamped version of the game, was released March 11, 2008. This new version is based on the original design but now improved by Jonas Møller.

Lost Empire Immortals received a Metacritic score of 58, which means "mixed or average" reviews. Reviewers praised the graphics and the scale of the game, but criticized the awkward interface, computer AI, and balance problems with very large galaxies.
