= Tarr Chronicles =

2007 video game

- Developer(s): Quazar Studio, Akella
- Publisher(s): Paradox Interactive (AU) cdv Software
- Engine: BRU Engine
- Platform(s): Microsoft Windows
- Release: 2007: EU: September 28, 2007; NA: October 1, 2007; AU: November 8, 2007
- Genre(s): Space combat simulator
- Mode(s): Single-player

Tarr Chronicles (Russian: Хроники Тарр: Призраки звёзд) is a space combat simulation game developed by Quazar Studio and Akella and published by Paradox Interactive (AUS) and cdv Software. The game was released in 2007.

Tarr Chronicles initially debuted with incomplete joystick support. The game appeared to be released (and apparently designed) with the mouse and keyboard as the primary control system. The 1.0.6.0 patch however introduces joystick axis mapping to any game actions.

== Reception ==
Reception

Aggregate score
Aggregator	Score
Metacritic	60/100

Review scores
Publication	Score
GameSpot	4/10
GameZone	7.4/10
IGN	7/10
PC Format	62%
PC Gamer (US)	50%
PC Zone	60%

The game received "mixed" reviews according to video game review aggregator Metacritic.

== Sequel ==
- Dark Horizon
