= Salem (video game) =

- Official cover art
- Developer: Mortal Moments
- Publisher: Mortal Moments
- Platforms: Microsoft Windows, Linux, Mac OS X
- Release: June 19, 2015
- Genre: MMORPG
- Mode: Online multiplayer

Salem is a Java based free-to-play MMORPG developed by Mortal Moments. The game is set in 17th century New England featuring witchcraft and Lovecraftian creatures. This world is persistent and mutable, meaning player characters are able to make permanent changes to it by destroying and building landscape and houses etc. Gameplay in Salem is focused on all manner of crafting (farming, building, invention and so forth) and developing required character skills for doing so. It also features free-for-all PvP combat with the possibility to permanently kill player characters.

Originally announced in January 2011 and developed by Seatribe, a two-man development team, with Paradox Interactive attached as a publisher, it has been managed by indie developer Mortal Moments since 2014.
