= Leviathan: Warships =

2013 video game

- Developer: Pisces Interactive
- Publisher: Paradox Interactive
- Platforms: Windows; MacOS; iOS; Android
- Release: Windows: NA: April 28, 2013; EU: May 31, 2013; OS X, iOS, Android; April 30, 2013
- Genre: Turn-based strategy

Leviathan: Warships is a video game developed by Pieces Interactive and published by Paradox Interactive in 2013.

== Reception ==
Reception

Aggregate score
Aggregator	Score
Metacritic	(iOS) 71/100 (PC) 70/100

Review scores
Publication	Score
4Players	(PC) 70%
Destructoid	(PC) 7.5/10
Eurogamer	(iOS) 6/10
GamesMaster	(iOS) 69%
GameSpot	(PC) 6.5/10
IGN	(PC) 7.7/10
PC Gamer (UK)	(PC) 81%
PCGamesN	(PC) 7/10
Pocket Gamer	(iOS) 4/5
TouchArcade	(iPad) 3/5
Digital Spy	(iOS) 4/5

The iOS and PC versions received "mixed or average reviews" according to the review aggregation website Metacritic. GameSpot praised the PC version's naval combat, fleet customization options, and "rewarding payoff for clever tactics", but criticized the game's "poorly optimized" controls and "weak" campaign. IGN praised the multiplayer gameplay, but described the single-player campaign as "stagnant".
