= World War One (video game) =

2008 video game

- World War One cover art
- Developer(s): AGEOD
- Publisher(s): Ascaron Entertainment
- Platform(s): Microsoft Windows
- Release: WW: November 14, 2008
- Genre(s): Strategy
- Mode(s): Single-player, multiplayer

World War One is a 2008 strategy video game published by Ascaron Entertainment for Microsoft Windows.

== Reception ==
GamesRadar awarded World War One 7 out of 10, highlighting the vast game map of Europe, and the depth of diplomatic, economic and political options. The text-based tutorial was criticised, as was the slow AI and dull, uninformative combat results. IGN commented that "whatever joys might be found in the setting or the game design are still obscured by incomplete documentation, a clumsy interface and a number of bugs". IT Reviews said the game had a "user-unfriendly interface, an impenetrable tutorial and a constant desire to crash and burn".
