= Warlock: Master of the Arcane =

2012 video game

- Warlock: Master of the Arcane cover art
- Developer: 1C:Ino-Co Plus
- Publisher: Paradox Interactive
- Director: Aleksey Kozyrev
- Designers: Dmitry Gulin; Tatyana Savchenkova
- Artist: Alexey Shumeikin
- Writer: Pavel Kondrashov
- Series: Warlock
- Platform: Microsoft Windows
- Release: 8 May 2012
- Genre: Turn-based strategy
- Mode: Single-player

Warlock: Master of the Arcane is a 4X turn-based strategy video game developed by 1C:Ino-Co Plus and published by Paradox Interactive. It was released for Microsoft Windows on 8 May 2012. A sequel, Warlock II: The Exiled, was released in 2014.

== Gameplay ==
Warlock: Master of the Arcane is a 4X turn-based strategy game where players engage in world conquest against one another across a world map. The game is comparable to the Civilization series, particularly Civilization V where the game world is presented on a hexagon grid where all units, cities and pieces of environment are laid out on tiles. Each player takes control of a "Great Mage" to lead their faction to victory. There are several pre-made Great Mages available to select from the beginning, each with their own portraits, back story and selection of perks to help them in the initial stages of the game. However players can also customize any characters if they choose to. Each mage has a choice from a selection of perks that grant different abilities in gameplay from the beginning ranging from the amount of starting resources and production rate, spells and access to certain units or enhancements. There are three key resources players must manage; gold for new units, food for their upkeep and mana for casting spells.

Each Great Mage initially represents one of three races; humans, monsters and undead. The humans command a variety of staple medieval-style warriors and archers, while also utilizing mages and clerics. The monsters use a mixture of fantasy races including goblins, rat men and trolls. Finally the undead include reanimated skeletons, vampires, bat creatures and liches. While each Great Mage has immediate access to each race's units and buildings, they can later build and deploy non-starting race buildings and units if they capture an opposing city of that race. New constructions for a city can only be built on tiles within its borders, borders that will expand with gradual population growth and new buildings. Buildings themselves can produce resources including gold, food and mana, many of these being available for cities of any race while others depend on the race, including buildings for recruiting new units for that race. Natural tiles themselves can affect the effectiveness of buildings due to their landscape, for example a fertile field will boost the productivity of a food-based construction while an arid waste will hinder it. Certain tiles as part of the game world can also be built upon allowing unique constructions if within the city borders. Some will benefit productivity even further like a farm on an animal herd tile while others will allow the construction of special units not a part of any players’ race, including dwarves, minotaurs and werewolves. Units can gain experience through successful combat, granting players the option to grant them bonuses, increasing their effectiveness in combat

Throughout the game world there are also other threats besides players. Single state neutral cities of a random race are scattered across the map and are generally hostile to all mage players. Aggressive wildlife is also prevalent such as bears, giant spiders, demonic spawn and elementals and sea monsters in ocean titles, many of which will continue to spawn from a nest unless looted by the player for resources. These spawn points will appear randomly throughout the game.

Each game world is made up of multiple maps. All players begin within the same standard world known as Ardania made up of woodlands, deserts and arctic plains and seas and is traditionally the largest of all maps. Neutral portals however are found across Ardania that allow players to move units between dimensions known as Underworlds, opening up new maps. Players can settle within these worlds, allowing access to further unique tiles for resources, loot and potential access to some of the more powerful units of the game such as dragons. However the portals themselves are commonly defended by strong wild units, with further numerous dangerous wild life within each map.

Players can learn and cast various spells, each requiring research that can take multiple turns and at different tiers. Once a spell is available, players must spend mana points they have accumulated while also being within their mana pool, a gauge for all players that limits the number of spells that can be cast per turn. Spells can be used to help the effectiveness of units or tiles, spawn monsters or strike at enemy cities and armies.

As players expand their territory and explore, random quests can be given ranging from building a new city to defeating nearby wild units. Successfully completing them will reward players with gold, mana, spells and/or units. Special hero units can also be recruited as players expand, requiring a gold fee. Heroes can also gain experience while also equip artifacts and relics found through exploring, quests or random traveling merchants that will barter with players. Each hero has their own abilities, some even being able to cast spells separate from the player's mana pool.

Religion is also a feature, where players can align themselves with different gods. A player's alignment is dependent on whether or not they have completed quests a god has made available and if the player has built any temples to them. Like unique tiles, if they fall within a city's borders, temples can also be built on holy sites found randomly in each game world, thus swaying allegiance towards that god. Each god provides unique perks and buffs to certain units and spells while temples provide special units for that god, many also dependent on the player's starting race. The gods themselves oppose one another and favor with one can cause hatred for another and any players who follow them. Powerful and aggressive avatars of each god have a chance at spawning if their reputation with the corresponding god is hatred.

Diplomacy between players is possible despite there being only one winner by the end. Players can choose to agree to non-aggression pacts, alliances, declare war or make peace. Mana, spells and gold can also be traded or demanded to sway players further. Opposing AI players willingness to be diplomatic also depends on their starting race, religion, overall military strength and standing with other players. There are multiple victory conditions that can be set before each game. The first is Conquest, the standard victory where one player must simply defeat all other players. The second is a Holy victory requires one player to seize and maintain 50% of all holy sites to the gods. The third is a Unity victory where a player must gain and cast a unity spell over all others, effectively being a diplomatic victory. The fourth requires a player to kill a god's avatar if one is spawned.

== Reception ==
Following its release, Warlock: Master of the Arcane currently has an average critic score of 70/100 on the review aggregator website Metacritic.

Warlock: Master of the Arcane

Aggregate scores
Aggregator	Score
GameRankings	71.17%
Metacritic	70/100

Review scores
Publication	Score
Eurogamer	7/10
Game Informer	6.5/10
GameSpot	7.5/10
IGN	7.5/10
The Escapist	4.5/5
