= Majesty: The Fantasy Kingdom Sim =

2000 video game

- Developers: Cyberlore Studios; HeroCraft (mobile)
- Publishers: Hasbro Interactive (Note: Released under the MicroProse label) (PC); MacPlay (Mac)
- Composer: Kevin Manthei
- Platforms: Windows, Linux, Mac OS, Android, Symbian, iOS, Windows Phone
- Release: Windows: NA: March 21, 2000; UK: March 24, 2000; Mac: NA: December 12, 2000; Linux: April 24, 2003; Android: January 20, 2011; iOS: August 12, 2011; Windows Phone: March 23, 2012
- Genre: Real-time strategy
- Modes: Single-player, multiplayer

Majesty: The Fantasy Kingdom Sim is a real-time strategy (RTS) video game developed by Cyberlore Studios, and published by Hasbro Interactive under the MicroProse brand name for Windows in March 2000. It removes a central feature of the RTS genre, direct control over units.

The game is not a simulator. That part of the title is a reference to Majesty's central joke: affectionate parodying of fantasy role-playing games (RPGs). Drawing on RPG cliches presented in great seriousness, the realm of Ardania is ripe for wandering heroes to have adventures, with landscapes dotted with ancient evil castles, city sewers infested with giant rats, and guardsmen helpless against anything bigger than a goblin. But where convention would demand that the player take on a heroic role, they are instead cast as the quest-assigning troubled ruler, who in RPGs is a minor non-player character stock character/plot hook and essentially support staff.

MacPlay released a Mac OS port in December 2000. Infogrames released the expansion pack Majesty: The Northern Expansion for Windows in March 2001, and Majesty Gold Edition, a compilation for Windows bundling Majesty and The Northern Expansion, in January 2002. Linux Game Publishing released a Linux port of Majesty Gold Edition in April 2003. Majesty Gold Edition was re-released by Paradox Interactive under the name Majesty Gold HD Edition in March 2012, adding support for higher resolutions and including two downloadable quests that were incompatible with the original release of Majesty: The Northern Expansion.

A sequel, Majesty 2: The Fantasy Kingdom Sim, was released in 2009.

== Gameplay ==
The game has 19 single player scenarios but no overarching plotline. The Northern Expansion adds new unit abilities, buildings, monsters, and 12 new single player scenarios. Freestyle (sandbox) play and multiplayer are also available.

Each scenario ("quest") has a unique map. Even if the player chooses the same quest twice, it will have a map that, while retaining the general terrain of the region, is significantly different. The map is initially shrouded in blackness, but all activity in explored areas can be viewed no matter how far away from a building or character it is, with no fog of war.

In certain scenarios, the player also has the ability to interact with other kingdoms. This mainly includes the use of a kingdom's services by the heroes of a foreign faction, although in many cases, the player may choose to attack the foreign faction or will be automatically hostile toward them. In other, rarer instances, heroes may switch sides between kingdoms in the event that their guild has been destroyed and their native kingdom can no longer offer them hospitality.

=== Units ===
Units in Majesty are autonomous, a feature usually associated with construction and management simulation games. They act according to their internal priorities and cannot be given commands, only influenced by offering money for slaying a particularly troublesome monster or exploring an area of the map. Even then their cooperation is not guaranteed. Their preferences depend on their character class: for example, a paladin is much more likely to attack a dangerous monster than a rogue and will often choose to raid monster lairs, while rogues will steal and elves will perform at inns. Rogues will be the first to make an attempt at the rewards, followed soon after by elves or dwarves.

Heroes are the player's main fighting force. Borrowing from RPG conventions, heroes have individual experience points, experience levels, ability scores and inventories. Their names and monikers are randomly picked from class-specific pools, resulting in such names as Sir Calindor Broadedge for warriors, Skeev Neverspend for rogues, and Rulathal, Master of the Arcane for wizards (and Teylanoll the Soothing for healers.)

Henchmen are non-hero units that dwell in the player's palace and guard posts. They are automatically replaced when they die, numbered instead of named, and nonetheless essential to maintaining the realm. Peasants construct and repair buildings. Tax collectors collect gold to finance the realm. Guards provide a measure of defense. In addition, trade posts regularly spawn caravans to travel to a marketplace, where they deliver gold based on the distance they traveled. The Northern Expansion places a sewer main break, a destructible beachhead of the evil underground ratmen, on the map once too many henchmen die; in the base game, having Peasant #35 succumb and be replaced by Peasant #36 only highlights their disposability.

Creature dens, ruined keeps, and other dungeon crawls are implemented as buildings that spawn monsters, and instead of being delved are attacked until they collapse. Some monsters are scripted or arrive by other means, ensuring that the heroes never run out of fights for good. Experience is awarded with every attack and in some cases for class-specific acts, such as uncovering parts of the map or healing others. Heroes automatically learn any spells and other abilities of their class at specific levels, except wizards, who are not only slow, extremely fragile, and expensive, but require the player to pay for a library for studying some of their more useful spells. On the other hand, a wizard who manages to make it to high levels is very powerful (and fragile.) Parties are not implemented, but a few classes have preferences to follow and support others, and most ways heroes gain gold are split between all in the vicinity without attempting to determine if they've teamed up.

=== Buildings ===
Peasants constructing a guild. In the lower left, a blacksmith's shop has grown more elaborate indicating that it has been upgraded once out of a maximum of twice, and the light at the window and smoke from the chimney show that at least one hero is inside upgrading equipment.

Without the ability to command, the Sovereign's actions are limited to constructing and enhancing buildings, using building abilities and spells, hiring heroes, and offering rewards.

Base-building is comparable to other RTS games of the period. The game's sole resource is gold, and the player pays to construct buildings offering one or more of:

1. Guilds and temples that can be used to summon and house heroes (typically four per building). Heroes are hired there with gold, return there to recover or retreat, and leave if left with nowhere to stay. Temples and the wizard's guild allow the player to pay to cast spells, such as healing, haste, slow, or spells such as lightning bolt that directly damage enemies, but killing monsters with those alone rapidly becomes very expensive. Temples have mutual exclusivities. Likewise, the player may only host one of elves, dwarves, and gnomes.
2. Goods or services to heroes. In addition to shopping options such as blacksmiths and marketplaces, inns give a heroes another place to rest, heroes can gain experience at fairgrounds, learn minor aids at libraries even if they're not wizards, and meditate for random buffs at royal gardens.
3. Defense, they fire at enemies and/or host a guard. Of limited importance, the only defensive building that neither increases in price as more are built, as most buildings in Majesty do, or costs to use in this mode (ie. the only one with the capabilities of a standard RTS defense tower) is the dwarven ballista tower, which requires committing to dwarves over the other races.
4. Money. The marketplace in particular combines sales to heroes, the highest automatic daily income of all buildings, and caravans.

For an example of a building with multiple approaches, inns (which have individual names, such as The Surly Dwarf) have a modest daily income, allow heroes to rest and regain health in faraway places, and by steering heroes into their area, they have a defensive use.

Some don't ask permission. Houses are built as the player hires more heroes and bring in a modicum of daily income. The settlement's growth brings sewer grates and the death of too many heroes graveyards, both of which are indestructible and spawn monsters.

Some buildings have special, usually paid, abilities. For example, a warrior's guild's call to arms instantly moves all its heroes to its gates. Many have features to be researched, ie. unlocked with money, such as selling goods to heroes, and can be upgraded with money to increase their HP and give access to such features as more Sovereign's spells to pay to cast and a greater selection of wares to pay to research. Majesty's systems have many small details, such as how owning a blacksmith's gives a small discount for all construction, and building royal gardens will automatically place a gazebo in the settlement to give heroes a peaceful rest.

=== Economy ===
To pay for all of the above, the player has two revenue streams: buildings that generate gold - marketplaces through caravans most of all, but many with an automatic income every in-game day — or symbiosis with the heroes. Heroes gain gold when they kill a monster, receive a reward, destroy a den of evil, or open treasure chests scattered across the land. The next time they visit home, they pay a portion to the building's coffers as taxes. Facilities permitting, they'll (hopefully) spend the rest on better weapons and armor, enchanting their weapons and armor up to +3, temporarily poisoning their weapons at an upgraded rogues' guild, healing potions, and minor magic items. The Northern Expansion adds a magic bazaar for a range of other potions (and taking money from heroes that have bought everything else.) A portion of every sale is set aside for the Sovereign as taxes.

Inviting elves in doubles the gold generated by the first option, but also places a gambling hall and an "elven lounge" (implied brothel) that drain heroes of their wealth without paying taxes or giving them anything in exchange. Fortunately, rewards for destruction also work for the player's own buildings. (Gnomes offer cheap, shunned, numerous builders and cannon fodder.)

However it is earned, gold does not belong to the player before a tax collector retrieves it and survives to deposit it. In lieu of giving commands, the player can designate individual buildings for pickup, as exempt, or for pickup once (with the same choices for repair,) and adjust tax collectors' collective minimum thresholds for pickup and return. Extort, a rogues' guild's special ability, immediately gathers all available gold but most of if is lost in the process.

Gold is also spent as soon as it's offered as a reward. Rewards need money to draw the attention of heroes and can be increased or cancelled, but not retrieved.

== Reception ==
Reception

Aggregate scores
Aggregator	Score
GameRankings	PC: 76/100
Metacritic	iOS: 72/100

Review scores
Publication	Score
Computer Gaming World	4/5
Next Generation	3/5
PC Gamer (US)	82%
PC Zone	50/100
Computer Games Magazine	2.5/5

Majesty was generally well received by the gaming press, with many reviews commenting positively on its unique combination of elements from different genres. The game's Linux port was also well received, with gamers giving it four stars and numerous positive comments on The Linux Game Tome, as well as numerous positive comments at LinuxGames.

The game was reviewed in 2000 in Dragon #269 by Johnny L. Wilson in the "Silycon Sorcery" column. Wilson sums up the game: "Majesty offers a very different feeling than the average strategy or role-playing game in a fantasy world. It is similar to being a Dungeon Master or playing a simplified version of Birthright."

The editors of Computer Gaming World nominated Majesty as the best strategy game of 2000, although it lost to Sacrifice. However, the magazine presented Majesty with a special award "Pleasant Surprise of the Year", and the editors wrote that it "hooked more than one of us with a quick-paced, hands-off formula that defied our expectations and won our hearts."

Daniel Erickson reviewed the PC version of the game for Next Generation, rating it 3/5, and stated that "A great take on a classic formula. Only its lack of solid multiplay keeps Majesty out of the top ranks of RTS games."

== Legacy ==
=== Majesty: The Northern Expansion ===
Majesty: The Northern Expansion is generally seen as a fine sequel to the critically acclaimed Majesty. It holds a rating of 75% at GameRankings. It features new unit abilities, buildings, monsters, and twelve new single player scenarios (two of which are in a new "Master" level). Freestyle play is also available and includes new features including those present in the single player quests.

=== Majesty Gold HD Edition ===
On March 21, 2012, Paradox Interactive released Majesty Gold HD Edition. This version is identical to the standard Gold Edition containing both Majesty and Majesty: The Northern Expansion, but includes support for larger resolutions and native support for Windows 7. It also includes two downloadable quests that were compatible with the original Majesty, but not with the original release of The Northern Expansion.

=== Sequel ===
Cyberlore Studios planned a sequel, Majesty Legends, but it was never officially released. The developer cited the lack of a publisher as the reason. In July 2007, Paradox Interactive acquired the intellectual property for Majesty and released a sequel, Majesty 2: The Fantasy Kingdom Sim, on September 18, 2009.

=== Majesty Mobile ===
Mobile "Majesty: The Fantasy Kingdom Sim" is developed and published by HeroCraft and released on January 20, 2011. The game is designed to run on BlackBerry Playbook, iOS, Android, Bada and high-end Nokia Symbian devices. An iOS version is also available for iPhone, iPod touch, and iPad. The game is also available on Microsoft's Windows Phone platform as of March 2012.

== See also ==
- Recettear: An Item Shop's Tale, a 2007 game in a JRPG setting that casts the player as a shopkeeper.
- Dungeon Keeper, an influential 1997 strategy game in a fantasy setting that casts the player as the evil overlord.
