= AGEod =

Video game developer

- Industry: Video games
- Founded: Grenoble (Meylan), France (2005)
- Headquarters: Grenoble (Meylan), France
- Key people: Philippe Thibaut, CEO; Philippe Malacher, lead developer
- Products: Birth of America; Ageod's American Civil War; Field of Glory series (See complete products listing.)
- Website: www.ageod.com

AGEod (AGE Online Distribution) is a developer and publisher of PC games. The company is incorporated in France and has its head office located in Grenoble. The company specializes in developing history oriented strategy video games built with its proprietary Adaptive Game Engine (AGE), and also publishes third-party titles. AGEod's main goal is offering to players original, cultural, and gaming creations developed by small independent studios and producers that have trouble finding an outlet within the traditional organization of the market.

== History ==
AGEod was founded by Philippe Thibaut (designer of board game Europa Universalis, Pax Romana and Great Invasions) and Philippe Malacher (AGE engine creator) in 2005.

The first game distributed by AGEod was Birth of America, a turn-based strategy game about the French and Indian War that took place in the Seven Years' War, and also the American War of Independence. The second game, Ageod's American Civil War, is also a realistic historical turn-based strategy game about the American Civil War including political and economic options. The third game, Napoleon's Campaigns, is the successor of "Birth of America" with a tight focus on strategy during the Napoleonic Wars. In 2008, AGEod released Birth of America 2: Wars in America, which expanded the previous game Birth of America by a larger map, new rules, and new scenarios and campaigns.

On 17 December 2009, AGEod was acquired by Paradox Interactive. In 2012, Paradox France was split away from Paradox Development Studio to work exclusively on games utilizing the AGE engine, with full autonomy. Development of Napoleon's Campaigns II was shifted from being partially developed by Paradox Development Studio to being solely developed by them, utilizing the Clausewitz engine, that later become March of the Eagles.

== Adaptive Game Engine (AGE) ==
For its own titles, AGEod created and further developed AGE, a generic platform for turn-based strategy games, that is expandable and adaptable to different game scenarios. The engine comes in three main versions which in simplest terms determines the breadth and depth of the game which is built upon it. The scope may be heavily oriented towards a traditional war game (e.g., Birth of America, Napoleon's Campaigns, Birth of America 2: Wars in America) or much higher level with elements of country management, diplomacy, resource management (e.g., Ageod's American Civil War), and grand strategy considerations (e.g., Pride of Nations). The modularity of AGE allows AGEod to back port many features of recent releases to existing titles, practising a patch policy that goes beyond mere bug fixing.

== Games ==
=== As developer ===
- Birth of America (2006)
- Ageod's American Civil War - The Blue and the Gray (2007)
- Napoleon's Campaigns (2007)
- Birth of America 2: Wars in America (2008)
- World War One : La Grande Guerre 14-18 (2008)
- World War One Gold (2010) [ Remaster of WW1 : La Grande Guerre 14-18 ]
- Rise of Prussia (2010)
- Revolution Under Siege (2010)
- Pride of Nations (2011)
  - The Spanish-American War 1898 (2011)
  - The American Civil War 1862 (2011)
  - The Franco-Prussian War 1870 (2011)
  - The Scramble for Africa (2012)
- Alea Jacta Est (video game) (2012)
  - Birth of Rome (2013)
  - The Spartacus Revolt 73 BC (2013)
  - The Cantabrian Wars - 29BC (2013)
  - Parthian Wars (2013)
  - Hannibal: Terror of Rome (2014)
- Ageod's American Civil War II (2013)
  - The Bloody Road South (2014)
- Rise of Prussia Gold (2013) [ Remaster of Rise of Prussia ]
- Espana 1936 (video game) (2013)
- To End All Wars (video game) (2014)
  - Breaking the Deadlock (2015)
- Revolution Under Siege Gold (2015) [ Remaster of Revolution Under Siege]
- Thirty Years' War (2015)
- Wars of Napoleon (2015)
- English Civil War (2017)
- Wars of Succession (2018)
- Field of Glory: Empires (2019)
  - Persia 550 - 330 BCE (2020)
- Field of Glory: Kingdoms (2024)

=== As publisher ===
- Great Invasions (2006)
- Wicked Defence (2007)
- Montjoie! (2007)
