= Dark Horizon =

2008 video game

- Developer: Quazar Studio
- Publishers: Paradox Interactive, Akella
- Platform: Microsoft Windows
- Release: NA: September 23, 2008; EU: September 26, 2008
- Genre: Space combat simulator
- Mode: Single-player

Dark Horizon, released as Tarr Chronicles: Guardians of the Border (Russian: Хроники Тарр: Стражи Пограничья) in Russia, is a space combat simulation game developed by Russian team Quazar Studio and published by Paradox Interactive. The game released in North America on September 23, 2008. Dark Horizon is the prequel to Tarr Chronicles.

The game received mixed reviews, and it was the second and last game produced by Quazar Studio.

== Gameplay ==
The game takes place circa 100 years prior to Tarr Chronicles. The game is set in a fictional galaxy called Enosta, which is under the invasion of a malignant entity simply known as the Mirk. The player is a member of the Guardians, a society of people partially infected by the Mirk, who are attempting to construct a structure to contain the entity from wiping out rest of the galaxy, called the Light Core. The player is assigned to defend the Guardians from attack from the Mirk and ultimately finish construction of the Light Core.

Dark Horizon plays similarly to its predecessor. Players can now switch between 2 unique fighting modes; Shadow mode briefly turn the player's starship invisible, while decreasing firepower and speed. Corter mode sharply increases the player's offensive capabilities, but will constantly drain the player's shields until deactivated. The usage of these modes is determined by a 'cooling' system; If the player's starship is cooled down enough, Shadow mode will be activated. The opposite is true for Corter mode. Players can choose between third-person and first-person view.

== Reception ==
Reception

Aggregate score
Aggregator	Score
Metacritic	55/100

Review scores
Publication	Score
GameSpot	4.5/10
GamesRadar+	3/5
IGN	6/10
PC Zone	62%
411Mania	7/10

The game received "mixed" reviews, more so than the first, according to video game review aggregator Metacritic. IGN called the game "flawed" and "almost unifinished", but praised the graphics improvement from Tarr Chronicles - although GameSpot criticized the graphical design, calling it "very dark, even for deep space". Gamespot also criticized the confusing storyline and level design.

== See also ==
- Tarr Chronicles
