= Life by You =

Cancelled life simulation video game

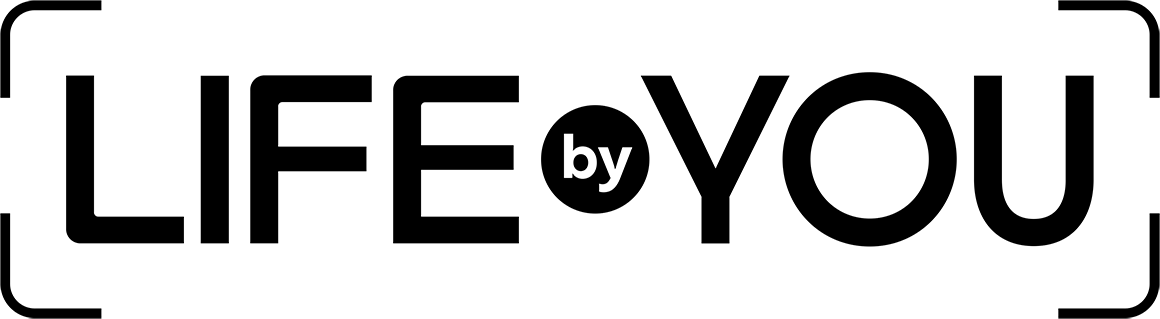
- Developer: Paradox Tectonic
- Publisher: Paradox Interactive
- Director: Rod Humble
- Platform: Windows
- Release: Cancelled
- Genre: Life simulation
- Mode: Single-player

Life by You is a cancelled life simulation game developed by the now-closed Paradox Tectonic studio for Paradox Interactive.

== Gameplay ==
Some gameplay elements were demoed before the game's early access release. Life by You would have included divergent game mechanics, where player choices might not always have the same result. Characters also spoke in English and had multiple dialogue choices.

The developers also introduced a significant amount of detail, shown when characters left their clothes on the floor or when they cut flowers from a garden and were then able to arrange those same flowers in a vase.

== Development ==
Life by You was the debut title for Paradox Tectonic, which was founded in March 2019. The game's development was being led by former Executive Vice President of EA Play and Head of The Sims Label Rod Humble. The game was teased on March 6, 2023, and the first full trailer was published on March 20, 2023. The game's early access release was delayed three times, missing its initial release date of September 12, 2023, its second target of March 5, 2024, and its last date of June 4, 2024.

=== Cancellation ===
On June 17, 2024, Paradox announced that it had cancelled the game. When speaking about the release, Paradox Interactive CEO Fredrik Wester stated "For a long time, we've held hopes for Life by You and the potential we saw in it, but it is now clear that the game will not be able to meet our expectations. A version that we'd be satisfied with is too far away, and therefore we are taking the difficult decision to cancel the release. Moving forward, we should perform at a much higher level, and it's obvious that we have work ahead of us". Paradox Tectonic was subsequently closed down the next day.

Paradox took a $19.2 million write-down on development costs for the game and reported a 90% drop in profit for the second quarter of 2024 as a result.

== See also ==
- InZOI
- The Sims
- Paralives
