= Warlock II: The Exiled =

2014 video game

- Warlock 2: The Exiled retail cover art
- Developer: 1C:Ino-Co Plus
- Publisher: Paradox Interactive
- Series: Warlock
- Platforms: Microsoft Windows, Linux, OS X
- Release: Windows; 10 April 2014; Linux, OS X; 21 October 2014
- Genre: Turn-based strategy
- Mode: Single-player

Warlock II: The Exiled is a 4X turn-based strategy video game developed by 1C:Ino-Co Plus and published by Paradox Interactive. It was released for Microsoft Windows on 10 April 2014. It is the sequel to Warlock: Master of the Arcane.

== Gameplay ==
Like its predecessor, Warlock II: The Exiled is a 4X turn-based strategy game where players and engage in world conquest against one another across a world map.

== Reception ==
Following its release, Warlock II: The Exiled currently has an average critic score of 73/100 on the review aggregator website Metacritic. Reviews were generally favorable. PC Games (Germany) states "Ino-Co Plus has done a good job of adding clever features to the established formula." Most criticism asserted a marginal improvement from the original with major problems remaining and fails to sustain interest of those who have played the original.

Warlock II: The Exiled

Aggregate scores
Aggregator	Score
GameRankings	76.67%
Metacritic	73/100

== Warlock 2: Wrath of the Nagas ==
Warlock 2: Wrath of the Nagas is the first expansion pack to Warlock II, released on 21 October 2014.
