= Wild Rapids =

2000 video game

Wild Rapids (爆流, Bakaryu) is a water sports video game developed by Fujimic, Inc in 2000 for the PlayStation.

== Gameplay ==
In Wild Rapids there are three playable modes: tournament, time attack and vs battle. Tournament mode is a progressive battle through the game's nine stages, players choose a racer and kayak must be among the first three across the finish line to proceed to the next stage. In time attack players pick a racer, kayak and any stage and attempt to beat the pre-existing lap records. Vs battle allows two players to race splitscreen on any stage. There is also a replay mode which triggers on successful completion of a race that allows the player to view the race from multiple camera angles. There are five playable characters with an additional sixth character unlockable by completing the remains course, there are eight playable courses with a ninth unlockable by beating the city stage.
