= Steel Fury =

2007 video game

Steel Fury: Kharkov 1942
- Developers: Discus Games; Graviteam
- Publishers: Buka (Russian); Lighthouse Interactive
- Platform: Windows
- Release: RU: November 2007; WW: 2008
- Genre: Simulation
- Mode: Single-player

Steel Fury: Kharkov 1942 is a World War 2 tank simulation computer game, set during the Kharkov offensive of 1942. It was made by the Ukrainian game developer team Graviteam and Russian developer Discus Games.

The game was released in Russia in November 2007 (Buka). An English version of the game was released in 2008. The publisher was the now defunct Lighthouse Interactive Game Publishing.

== Reception ==
Sector.sk and Peter Zeilstra of Gamer.nl praised the realistic graphics and gameplay, though the latter noted that a tank simulator would always be "dry". However, both publications criticized the lack of multiplayer gameplay.

In 2015, PC Gamer contributor Tim Stone described it as one of the 20 best war games in history.
