= AGEOD's American Civil War =

2007 video game

Ageod's American Civil War
- Developer: AGEOD
- Publishers: NA: Matrix Games; EU: Ascaron; NA: Take-Two Interactive (2008)
- Designers: Philippe Thibaut, Philippe Malacher
- Platforms: Windows, Mac OS X
- Release: NA: June 26, 2007 (Online); EU: September 15, 2007; NA: January 28, 2008; OS X: WW: April 8, 2011
- Genre: Turn-based strategy
- Modes: Single-player, multiplayer

AGEOD's American Civil War: 1861-1865 - The Blue and the Gray is a historical operational turn-based strategy video game that places players at the head of the United States or Confederate States during the American Civil War (1861–1865).

Players are military and political leaders trying to lead the troops of their nations (armies and fleets) to victory, while making political and economical/financial decisions throughout the game that affect the outcome.

Most of the individual years of campaign between 1861 and 1865 are playable via a separate scenario. Advanced scenarios allow recreation of yearly and/or theater campaigns.

Virtual Programming published the Mac OS X version of the game on April 8, 2011.

== Reception ==
Reception

Aggregate score
Aggregator	Score
Metacritic	63/100

Review scores
Publication	Score
GameSpy	3/5
GameZone	7/10
IGN	6.2/10
PC Zone	41%

The game received "mixed" reviews according to the review aggregation website Metacritic.

== Sequel ==
A sequel, titled Civil War II, was developed by AGEod and published by Slitherine Software. Developed to commemorate the 150th anniversary of the American Civil War, it was released in 2013. The developers partnered with the Civil War Trust, and a portion of proceeds from the sale of the game was donated to the trust.
