= Pride of Nations =

2011 video game

- Developer(s): AGEOD
- Publisher(s): Paradox Interactive
- Platform(s): Microsoft Windows
- Release: 8 June 2011
- Genre(s): Turn-based, Grand strategy
- Mode(s): Single-player, Multiplayer

Pride of Nations is a turn-based grand strategy video game set in the 19th century and 20th century (1850-1920) which allows players to play as one of the great powers (United Kingdom, United States, France, Prussia, Austria, Italy, Russia and Japan) to industrialize their nation, or expand their nation by military conquest and colonization.

== Reception ==
Pride of Nations received mixed reviews from critics upon release. On Metacritic, the game holds a score of 70/100 based on 14 reviews.
