= Cyberlore =

American video game developer

Cyberlore Studios, Inc.
- Industry: Video games
- Founded: October 1992
- Defunct: 2005
- Headquarters: Northampton, Massachusetts, United States
- Key people: Lester Humphreys; Ken Grey; Herb Perez
- Products: Majesty: The Fantasy Kingdom Sim
- Number of employees: 28 (1998)
- Website: cyberlore.com

Cyberlore Studios, Inc. was an American video game developer based in Northampton, Massachusetts.

== History ==
The company was founded in 1992 by Lester Humphreys, Ken Grey, and Herb Perez. Since 1992, they produced expansion packs for MechWarrior 4, Heroes of Might and Magic II, and Warcraft II: Tides of Darkness. They also produced Playboy: The Mansion (2005), a simulation game based on the life of Hugh Hefner and Playboy, and a PlayStation 2 version of the classic board game Risk. Their most notable game is Majesty: The Fantasy Kingdom Sim, whose original concept was created by Jim DuBois, who worked for the company as a senior designer.

The company grew from six employees in 1992 to thirty employees in 2000.

In 2005, Cyberlore ceased development of general entertainment games after the collapse of their publisher, Hip Games, and the subsequent layoff of two-thirds of their staff. The company refocused on the serious game corporate training market, under the new company name of Minerva Software.

== Published games ==
- Al-Qadim: The Genie's Curse (1994)
- Entomorph: Plague of the Darkfall (1995)
- Warcraft II: Beyond the Dark Portal (1996)
- Heroes of Might and Magic II: The Price of Loyalty (1997)
- Deadlock II: Shrine Wars (1998)
- Majesty: The Fantasy Kingdom Sim (2000)
- Majesty: The Northern Expansion (2001)
- MechWarrior 4: Black Knight (2001)
- MechWarrior 4: Mercenaries (2002)
- Risk: Global Domination (2003)
- Playboy: The Mansion (2005)
