= Foundry (video game) =

- Developer: Channel 3 Entertainment
- Publisher: Paradox Interactive
- Platform: Windows
- Release: May 2, 2024 (early access)
- Genre: Factory simulation
- Modes: Single-player, multiplayer

Foundry is a factory simulation video game developed by Channel 3 Entertainment and published by Paradox Interactive. It was released on Steam for Windows in early access on May 2, 2024. The player takes control of a worker robot on an alien planet who builds factories that construct robots, then sells them. It also contains online cooperative multiplayer. The game has been heavily compared to Satisfactory in its setting and gameplay. It was praised by reviewers for its voxel-based, procedurally-generated world resembling Minecraft, though it was also criticized as being overly forgiving in its gameplay and lacking difficulty.

== Reception ==
Enrico Marx of GameStar played the game's alpha preview in 2022 after purchasing it from Itch.io, and said he was skeptical it could be better than Satisfactory, calling its world lifeless due to a lack of animals, and saying the gameplay lacked uniqueness. Following its release in 2024, Wes Fenlon of PC Gamer described Foundry as "calm" and "pleasant", but he preferred other factory simulation games over it due to its lack of challenge, describing it as "dull" due to having too many conveniences that removed any friction from the building process. Mikhail Madnani of TouchArcade praised the game's soundtrack, describing the game itself as good for Steam Deck and having a "solid base".
