= Supreme Ruler: Cold War =

2011 video game

- Developer(s): BattleGoat Studios
- Publisher(s): Paradox Interactive
- Platform(s): Windows
- Release: July 19, 2011
- Genre(s): Grand strategy
- Mode(s): Single-player, multiplayer

Supreme Ruler: Cold War is a grand strategy game developed by BattleGoat Studios and published by Paradox Interactive for Windows on July 19, 2011. It is set during the Cold War Era from the end of World War II to the early 1990s. The main campaign allows the player to be the head of either the U.S. or the USSR, while the sandbox game mode can be played from any nation's point of view.

== Development ==
Supreme Ruler: Cold War is the third title in the Supreme Ruler series, following future-based titles Supreme Ruler 2010 and Supreme Ruler 2020. The gameplay features a new sophisticated Sphere of Influence system, as well as the usual military, economic and diplomatic simulation of the previous games.
