= Dungeonland (video game) =

2013 video game

- Developer: Critical Studio
- Publisher: Paradox Interactive
- Designers: Mark Venturelli, Gabriel Ribeiro Teixeira
- Engine: Unity
- Platforms: Microsoft Windows, OS X
- Release: Windows; January 29, 2013; OS X May 20, 2013
- Genre: Moba
- Modes: Single-player, Multiplayer

Dungeonland was a 2013 dungeon crawler MOBA made by Brazilian developer Critical Studio using the Unity engine. The game was released on January 29, 2013 for Windows and was shut down by Paradox on April 18, 2018.

== Gameplay ==
Dungeonland was a multiplayer dungeon crawler MOBA, which takes place in a theme park controlled by a 'Dungeon Maestro'. Featuring an isometric camera, the focus of each match is for the 3 players to overcome the obstacles and enemies of the dungeon set by the other player as the Dungeon Maestro. The game features simultaneous local and online multiplayer.

It is also possible for a fourth player to play as the Dungeon Maestro against the other players. They gain cards that can be spent with mana points to create obstacles such as killer rabbits, exploding frogs, or giant fans.

== Development ==
In November 2013, a free-to-play version of the game was released through Valve's Steam platform. The game's publisher Paradox Interactive initially had planned to develop Dungeonland into a franchise.

Dungeonland was shut down by Paradox on April 18, 2018.

== Reception ==
Reception

Aggregate score
Aggregator	Score
Metacritic	67/100

Review scores
Publication	Score
4Players	60%
Destructoid	8/10
Eurogamer	8/10
Gamekult	6/10
GameSpy	2/5
Hardcore Gamer	4/5
Hyper	7/10
IGN	4.6/10
Jeuxvideo.com	11/20
PC Gamer (UK)	70%
The Digital Fix	7/10
Digital Spy	3/5

The PC version received "average" reviews according to the review aggregation website Metacritic.
