= Supreme Ruler 1936 =

2014 video game

- Developer: BattleGoat Studios
- Publisher: BattleGoat Studios
- Platform: Windows
- Release: May 9, 2014
- Genre: Strategy
- Modes: Single-player, multiplayer

Supreme Ruler 1936 is a grand strategy computer wargame developed by BattleGoat Studios set in the World War II era. First announced in March 2013, It is a sequel to Supreme Ruler: Cold War. The game was released on May 9, 2014.

In the game, players will attempt to control a country during the time of the Second World War.

Supreme Ruler 1936 generally operates as a real time strategy game, though players are able to pause the game or change the game speed. The military element of the game is played through battalion-sized units represented on the game map, that can be controlled and given orders using the mouse individually or through groupings. Optionally players may leave unit initiative turned on, which will allow the AI to control military units for the player.

The player may also use Cabinet Ministers to assist with the operation of their regions, through the use of a Minister-priorities system and an in-game alerts system.

The main focus of the game are on four campaigns, each taking place from the perspective of either Germany, Japan, Italy, and the United Kingdom. Scenarios depict key moments in the war, such as Operation Barbarossa, Case Blue, and even alternate history scenarios such as Operation Sea Lion.

Multiplayer is available in LAN or Internet play for up to 16 players.

== Reception ==
Armchair General said: "SR36 is a unique game; no other World War II—or any global war strategy game—can match the excitement of the series, and SR36 continues the legacy of its ancestors." Digitally Downloaded wrote: "Supreme Ruler 1936 gets all the basics right. It has engaging combat, a robust economic model and plenty of entertaining gameplay." 4Players called it a solid world war simulator, despite its flaws.
