= Rise of Prussia =

2010 video game

- Box art
- Developer: AGEOD
- Publisher: Paradox Interactive
- Platform: Microsoft Windows
- Release: March 9, 2010
- Genres: Turn-based, Grand strategy
- Modes: Single-player, multiplayer

Rise of Prussia is a grand strategy wargame developed by AGEOD and published by Paradox Interactive. It was announced on April 24, 2009 and was released on March 9, 2010. The game covers the European campaigns of the Seven Years’ War (1756–1763).

A remastered version of the game, Rise of Prussia Gold, released on May 8, 2013. This edition featured fixes and improvements to the original game while adding three new scenarios that expand the length of the game.

== Gameplay ==
A preview image of Rise of Prussia showing the map, interfaces, and battle report.

Rise of Prussia features 200 leaders with individual portraits and 300 units. Players have the option to select from two sides. There is Prussia and its allies led by Frederick II and opposing them are Austria and its allies. Each leader has their own individual abilities that will provide bonuses to their units. For example, Frederick II has movement bonuses that makes his troops move significantly faster than that of other generals. There are 20 scenarios the player can choose from. 12 of these are battle scenarios centered on key battles, 7 span each year of the war, and the final Grand Campaign scenario spans the entire conflict. The map covers all of Germany and surrounding vicinity, with over 1,000 different regions.

== Reception ==
Rise of Prussia received mixed to negative reviews upon release. On Metacritic, the game holds a score of 54/100 based on 6 reviews.
