= Birth of America =

2006 video game

- Developer(s): SEP BOA
- Publisher(s): AGEOD
- Designer(s): Philippe Thibaut, Philippe Malacher
- Platform(s): Windows
- Release: WW: February 24, 2006 (Online); NA: July 26, 2006 (Steam); EU: September 1, 2006; NA: October 5, 2006
- Genre(s): Wargame
- Mode(s): Single player, multiplayer

Birth of America is a wargame by SEP BOA, a development team at AGEOD.

== Gameplay ==
In Birth of America, the player controls one of the major contenders of the French and Indian War or the American War of Independence, trying to achieve military and political victory.

The scope of the game covers all of North America, from Florida to Quebec and New England to Mississippi, from 1755 to 1783. The game map is divided into more than 700 provinces, with a great diversity of terrain, climates and civilization levels.

There are two nations fighting each other in all of the game's ten scenarios. Game turns correspond to one month of historical time. Scenarios vary from a few months to almost 9 years. Players control mostly the military action of their nation. This includes such activities as drafting forces, building forts and depots, sieges and blockades, raiding enemy settlements and battles, both on land and at sea.

Birth of America has two wars, the French and Indian War and the American Revolution. The object of the game is to attack and capture objectives, strategic towns, and manage strategies in order to win battles thus gaining edge. Real political events, such as the battle of Bunker Hill and the signing of the Declaration of Independence, will also influence the outcome of morale throughout the game.

== Reception ==
Reception

Aggregate score
Aggregator	Score
Metacritic	71/100

Review scores
Publication	Score
Eurogamer	7/10
GameSpot	6.9/10
PC Gamer (UK)	71%
PC Zone	70%

The game received "average" reviews according to the review aggregation website Metacritic. Over four months before the game was released for retail in Europe, PC Gamer UK gave it a review and commented that it "captures the unique character of American Revolutionary warfare without drowning wannabe Washingtons and Howes in detail." GameSpot lamented that "it doesn't do quite enough to broaden the genre's appeal to newcomers."

The editors of Computer Games Magazine presented Birth of America with their 2006 "Best Wargame" award.
