= Legion (video game) =

2002 video game

- Developers: Slitherine Software; Paradox Interactive
- Publishers: NA: Strategy First; UK: Koch Media; Mac OS X: EU: Virtual Programming; NA: Freeverse Inc.
- Designer: Iain McNeill
- Platforms: Windows, OS X, iPad
- Release: Windows: NA: June 4, 2002; UK: September 20, 2002; Mac OS X: EU: April 1, 2003; NA: April 10, 2003; iOS: WW: March 12, 2013
- Genre: Computer wargame
- Mode: Single player

Legion is a turn-based computer wargame with a historical setting, designed by Slitherine and released in 2002. In Legion, the player attempts to build a powerful army by controlling villages and defeating enemies with the ultimate goal of dominating a region. An updated version, Legion Gold, was released in 2003. A port for OS X was released in 2003, developed by Freeverse. A sequel, Legion II, was announced on November 16, 2004, for a 2005 release.

== Gameplay ==
Legion is a turn-based single-player wargame. The strategy of battle involves fighting on favorable terrain with enemies weak against the player's units. Other concerns are capturing cities that produce food, stone and wood. Upgrading the cities' buildings leads to the production of stronger units.

Each unit in Legion has its own strengths and weaknesses, different types of attacks (melee and ranged) and weapon.

Victory screen of an alternative campaign in Elysium Field. Note that the game declares the player a victor when domination is achieved, rather than total conquest

Legion takes place in the historic setting of the Roman expansion, from the conquest of Italy, Britain, Hispania, Gaul and Germania.

=== Campaigns ===
Legion Gold comes with eight campaign maps (including tutorial), each of which has three difficulty levels and options for historical and non-historical gameplay settings. The maps are generally well-researched and correspond closely to historical geography in the names of tribes and locations of cities.

== Development ==
Legion was announced on July 30, 2001. The release of Legion was on June 4, 2002. An iPad version was released on December 31, 2012.

== Reception ==
Reception

Aggregate score
Aggregator	Score
GameRankings	64%

Review scores
Publication	Score
GameSpot	5.9/10
IGN	4/10

Legion Gold got a 6.9 on Gamezone, an 8 on Gamevortex and a 7.5 on the Entertainment Depot, amongst others.

The game sold over 100,000 copies.

== See also ==
- Legion Arena
