= Chroma Squad =

2015 video game

- Logo
- Developer: Behold Studios
- Publishers: Behold Studios; Bandai Namco Entertainment
- Producer: Saulo Camarotti
- Designer: Mark Venturelli
- Programmers: Saulo Camarotti; Guilherme Mazzaro; Leonardo Prunk; Leonardo Leite
- Artists: Bruno Briseno; Betu Souza; Hugo Vaz
- Composers: Raphael Müller; Washington Rayk
- Platforms: Microsoft Windows, OS X, Linux, PlayStation 4, Xbox One, iOS, Android, Nintendo Switch
- Release: Microsoft Windows, OS X, Linux; April 30, 2015; iOS, Android; May 18, 2017; Playstation 4, Xbox One; May 19, 2017; Nintendo Switch; Aug 1, 2019
- Genre: Tactical role-playing
- Mode: Single-player

Chroma Squad is a tactical role-playing video game developed by the Brazilian development team at Behold Studios. The game is influenced by tokusatsu TV shows, particularly the Super Sentai and Power Rangers franchises. The game's development was funded via Kickstarter.

The game was released on April 30, 2015, for Microsoft Windows, Mac OS X and Linux. Digital distribution is available through Steam and GOG.com. Chroma Squad was released in early 2017 for PlayStation 4, Xbox One, iOS and Android mobile devices, being published by Bandai Namco Entertainment. A PlayStation Vita version was planned, however was ultimately cancelled. It was announced to be released on May 19, 2017, on PSN for PlayStation 4. It was also released for Nintendo Switch on Aug 1, 2019.

== Plot ==
The game follows a team of stunt actors that tired of their previous job, decide to start their own Tokusatsu company, assisted by a mysterious artifact they find known as "Cerebro".

== Gameplay ==
Once the studio is established, the player must assign the actors, each with their own special traits, to their respective roles in the team and their suits' colors. Other features can be changed as the game progresses including the team's name, the name of their robot and their catchphrases. Each stage in the game is a different episode of the show in which the heroes fight a group of villains, sometimes followed by a battle between the team's giant mecha and an enlarged monster, and their performance during the episode take a direct impact on the show's ratings. High ratings increase the show's fanbase and revenue, which can be used to improve the studio and upgrade the team's equipment and mecha. The episodes are grouped into seasons and failure to complete the goals set by the sponsors at the end of each season will lead to a game over.

The battles follow the heroes fighting initially in their normal selves, but later gaining the ability to transform, recovering their HP and obtaining special abilities. The "teamwork" function allows heroes to help each other during battle, be it reaching longer distances, dealing powerful attacks together, or combining their powers into a special attack that increases ratings when used to destroy the monster of the week.

== Reception ==
Reception

Aggregate score
Aggregator	Score
Metacritic	PC: 75/100; PS4: 74/100

Review scores
Publication	Score
Destructoid	8/10
Game Informer	7/10
Polygon	7.5/10
Shacknews	8/10

Chroma Squad received mixed to positive reviews from critics upon release. On Metacritic, the game holds scores of 75/100 for the PC version (based on 21 reviews), and 74/100 for the PlayStation 4 version (based on 7 reviews).

== Rights dispute ==
The rights were disputed by Saban Brands, owner of the Power Rangers franchise brand. An agreement was reached where Saban was given a royalty share of the project. The game's official logo has an additional subtitle that reads "Inspired by Saban's Power Rangers™".

== See also ==
- Out of Space
