= Supreme Ruler 2010 =

2005 video game

- Developer: BattleGoat Studios
- Publishers: NA: Strategy First; UK: Black Bean Games
- Platform: Windows
- Release: NA: May 10, 2005; UK: July 7, 2006
- Genre: Strategy
- Modes: Single-player, multiplayer

Supreme Ruler 2010 is a computer wargame in which a player controls all aspects of a region's government and attempts to unite a world of fragmented states in the year of 2010.

The game was produced by BattleGoat Studios and released by Strategy First in 2005.

Official support for Supreme Ruler 2010 ended in August 2006 with the release of the 6th update. The final version of the game was 4.6.1.

A sequel, Supreme Ruler 2020, was released in 2008 by publisher Paradox Interactive.

== Reception ==
Reception

Aggregate score
Aggregator	Score
Metacritic	69/100

Review scores
Publication	Score
Computer Games Magazine	3/5
GameSpot	7.6/10
GameSpy	3.5/5
GameZone	8.3/10
IGN	7.8/10
Jeuxvideo.com	14/20
PC Gamer (UK)	67%
PC Gamer (US)	34%

Supreme Ruler 2010 received "average" reviews according to the review aggregation website Metacritic.

Brett Todd of GameSpot praised the game's ease of play and quantity of scenarios but criticized the difficulty as being artificially inflated. Barry Brenesal of IGN gave praise to its gameplay and interfaces but criticized the AI and the numerous bugs.
