= Supreme Ruler 2020 =

2008 video game

- Developer(s): BattleGoat Studios
- Publisher(s): Paradox Interactive
- Platform(s): Windows
- Release: NA: June 17, 2008; EU: June 20, 2008; Global Crisis; December 22, 2008
- Genre(s): Strategy
- Mode(s): Single-player, multiplayer

Supreme Ruler 2020 is a grand strategy wargame developed by BattleGoat Studios and published by Paradox Interactive. The game was released in 2008 and is a sequel to Supreme Ruler 2010. In the game, the player controls all aspects of a region's government attempts to unite a world of fragmented states. On December 22, 2008 BattleGoat Studios released an expansion pack for the game titled Global Crisis. A Gold Edition of the game containing both the core game and the expansion pack was released on September 18, 2009.

== Gameplay ==
The game allows players to choose either Scenarios with a defined scope and objective, or a Campaign "Sandbox" mode where there are no pre-determined victory conditions. There are over 250 playable regions simulated in the game. The player controls the economies, the militaries, research, government spending, spy operations (including the launching of satellites), and diplomacy. The player decides what military units to build, what facilities to build, how much or how little of a resource to produce, and also sets government policies in areas such as finance and social services. Diplomatic options include alliances, treaties, and trades of resources and technologies. The player can lead their people in technological advances and social reforms including globalization, free trade, renewable resources, biotechnology, nanotechnology, robotics, cyborg engineering and neural interface.

Supreme Ruler 2020 generally operates as a real time strategy game, though players are able to pause the game or change the game speed. The military element of the game is played through battalion-sized units represented on the game map, that can be controlled and given orders using the mouse individually or through groupings. Optionally players may leave unit initiative turned on, which will allow the AI to control military units for the player.

The player may also use Cabinet Ministers to assist with the operation of their regions, through the use of a Minister-priorities system and an in-game email system.

Multiplayer is available in LAN or Internet play for up to 16 players.

== Global Crisis Expansion ==
In December 2008 BattleGoat and Paradox released the Global Crisis Expansion Pack for Supreme Ruler 2020. This expansion featured additional content and improvements to the core game engine.

== Supreme Ruler 2020: Gold Edition ==
In 2009, Battlegoat Studios released a Gold Edition of Supreme Ruler 2020 including both the original game, as well as its expansion pack, Global Crisis. The Gold Edition is multiplayer compatible with the expansion pack for the core game.

== Reception ==
Reception

Aggregate score
| Aggregator | Score |
|---|---|
| Metacritic | 65/100 |

Review scores
| Publication | Score |
|---|---|
| 1Up.com | B− |
| 4Players | 76% |
| GameSpot | 4.5/10 |
| GameZone | 7/10 |
| IGN | 7.8/10 |
| Jeuxvideo.com | 13/20 |
| PC Gamer (UK) | 61% |
| PC Gamer (US) | 50% |
| PC Zone | 69% |

The game received "mixed" reviews according to the review aggregation website Metacritic.
