= Cities: Skylines - Snowfall =

DLC for Cities: Skylines

Cities: Skylines - Snowfall is the second major downloadable content (DLC) expansion pack for the construction and management simulation video game Cities: Skylines developed by Colossal Order and published by Paradox Interactive. The expansion was released on 18 February 2016 and adds winter features to the game.

== Reception ==
According to review aggregator Metacritic, the expansion received "mixed or average" reviews from critics. PC Gamer gave the expansion a rating of 83/100, stating, "I wouldn’t say it’s a complete game-changer, but it does add a few more frosty layers to your management challenges and options...", while noting that it altered the gameplay more than the prior expansion After Dark. Eurogamer.pl rated it 8/10, feeling that it was an improvement over the prior DLC that "greatly diversified the game's formula". Rock Paper Shotgun called it "a charming and worthwhile expansion for what is already an excellent city-builder", calling the features "relatively subtle additions that certainly have an impact," but wouldn't have too large of an effect on the game.

In contrast, GameSpot called it "pretty much an all-or-nothing proposition," feeling that the features were limited and "[didn't add] much in the way of difficulty." However, they still gave it a generally positive review, rating it 7/10. Common Sense Media gave the expansion a rating of 3/5, feeling it was difficult to play.

Retroactively, PC Gamer noted it was generally "one of the least well-regarded DLCs for Cities: Skylines." In particular, the decision to have many of the added features only available on winter maps has been criticized. TheGamer placed it fifteenth on their list of best DLCs for the game, while CBR placed it twelfth.
