= Surviving Mars =

2018 video game

- Developer: Haemimont Games (Note: Abstraction Games developed two downloadable content packs for the game.)
- Publisher: Paradox Interactive
- Director: Gabriel Dobrev
- Producer: Bisser Dyankov
- Designers: Boyan "Chimera" Ivanov; Boian "Blizzard" Spasov; Ivan Grozev
- Programmers: Ivan-Assen Ivanov; Svetoslav Genchev
- Artist: Chrom
- Composers: George Strezov; Jonatan Palmgren
- Platforms: Windows macOS; Linux; PlayStation 4 Xbox One; Relaunched; Windows; PlayStation 5 Xbox One; Xbox Series X/S
- Release: March 15, 2018; Relaunched; November 10, 2025
- Genres: City-building, survival
- Mode: Single-player

Surviving Mars is a city building survival video game developed by Haemimont Games and published by Paradox Interactive. It was released on Microsoft Windows, macOS, Linux, PlayStation 4 and Xbox One on March 15, 2018. The player serves as an overseer who must build a colony on Mars and ensure the survival of the colonists.

Two spiritual successors, Surviving the Aftermath and Surviving the Abyss, were released in 2019 and 2022. A spin-off, Surviving Mars: Pioneer, and a remaster, Surviving Mars: Relaunched, was released in November 10, 2025.

== Gameplay ==
Screenshot of the game, showing a dome and its buildings

Surviving Mars is a city-building survival game that takes place on Mars and is modeled after real Martian data. The player chooses a sponsoring nation and a commander profile, each conferring slightly different benefits, a unique building and vehicle. Possible sponsors include an International Mars Mission, the United States, Europe, India, China, Russia, and fictional organizations such as the Blue Sun Corporation, SpaceY, the Church of the New Ark, and Paradox Interactive. A rocket filled with resources, drones, prefabricated buildings, and Mars rovers lands on a selected location and prepares the basic infrastructure. The only resources that may be found on the surface or extracted from underground are metals, rare metals, concrete, water and sometimes polymers, all other resources (food, fuel, machine parts, electronics, power, oxygen) must be manufactured or imported. Money is only used for transactions between the colony and the sponsor, and is generated mainly from exports of rare metals. There is a technology tree divided in five categories: physics, engineering, social, biotechnology, and robotics. The game can generate natural disasters such as dust storms, meteor storms, cold waves, and dust devils.

To create a Mars colony the player must build a dome with buildings inside, provide power, water, and oxygen, and bring colonists from Earth. Each individual colonist has traits, flaws, and a specialization, making them fit to work at certain buildings and unfit for others. They also have stats on morale, comfort, sanity, and health, which vary according to gameplay. Happy colonists may father martian-born colonists. Unhappy colonists may become Earthsick and return to Earth or become rebels. People may also live in the domes as tourists, who do not work and stay for a limited time, and pay money if their comfort is high enough.

The game also has storylines called mysteries, which add various events to the colony, including plagues, war, rival corporations, AI revolt, alien contact, and others.

== Development ==
Haemimont Games, developers of the Tropico 5 game, initially led the game's development. The initial idea was to make a game set in outer space, and they soon realized that the setting and gameplay would be very different if the game was set on Mars, the Moon or Venus. Eventually they decided to use Mars as a result of the Mars race. The team studied the real-world challenges that scientists consider when thinking about colonizing Mars. These challenges were then translated into gameplay elements for the game. To do so, the developers sought to find a balance between the complexity of the real-world science and the more simplified nature of gameplay. CEO Gabriel Dobrev cited as an example the Mars Oxygen ISRU Experiment, or "MOXIE", a device that can generate breathable oxygen from the carbon dioxide of the atmosphere. Regardless of its internal working, when it was adapted into gameplay it became just a box that, once plugged, generates an in-game resource. And to avoid making it too simple, they generated situations where the MOXIE would not work, and others where it would break. Similarly, the game incorporates into its gameplay simplified versions of the problems an actual colonization effort would face, such as the Martian dust, the low temperatures and the constant need of food.

The game's aesthetics were inspired by The Jetsons and Futurama. Describing the game as a "hardcore survival city-builder, where players will be tasked with creating a livable colony in the harsh, hostile environs of Mars", publisher Paradox Interactive announced the game in May 2017. The game was released for Windows, macOS, PlayStation 4 and Xbox One on March 15, 2018. The game included mod support from the start.

=== Downloadable content ===
Surviving Mars has several DLCs, available either separately or as part of the digital season pass available in the game's "First Colony Edition". Space Race, the game's first expansion, was released on November 15, 2018. It introduces rival colonies competing to achieve milestones on Mars, and two new sponsor nations, Japan and Brazil. The second, Green Planet, was released on May 16, 2019, and introduces the concept of terraforming Mars into a planet that can sustain human life. Gabriel Dobrev reported that this was the highest user-requested feature since game launch. Several content packs were also released, including a building pack and the "Marsvision Song Contest" radio station (with the release of Space Race) and "Project Laika", which introduced ranching on Mars as well as pets in the colony (with the release of Green Planet).

In March 2021, Dutch studio Abstraction Games took over the development from Haemimont, and released a free update patch that expanded the gameplay options regarding tourism. The patch also released buildings created by Silva, a renowned modder of the game. On August 31, 2021, the paid expansion was announced as Below and Beyond, which includes underground facilities and the ability to build mining bases on asteroids. It was released on September 7. On August 28, 2022 was released a new paid expansion: "Martian Express", which includes trains as a new means of transport.

=== Surviving Mars: Relaunched ===
Relaunched is a remaster of Surviving Mars, developed by Haemimont Games. It was revealed by Paradox Interactive on August 20, 2025, and released November 10, 2025 for Microsoft Windows, PlayStation 5, and Xbox Series X. All DLC packs are included in the base game, as well as "improved visuals, UI, and quality of life improvements". In addition, a new "dynamic political system" titled "Martian Assembly" is included, and two of the existing Surviving Mars DLCs ("Martian Express" and "Below and Beyond") were reworked.

Feeding the Future, the first DLC pack for the remaster, was released on September 8, 2026.

== Reception ==
Reception

Aggregate score
Aggregator	Score
Metacritic	PC: 76/100; PS4: 73/100; XONE: 76/100

Review scores
Publication	Score
Destructoid	8/10
Eurogamer	Recommended
GameSpot	8/10
IGN	7.8/10
PC Gamer (US)	80/100
Push Square	7/10

The game received generally favorable reviews according to review aggregator website Metacritic, scoring 80% on PC Gamer, and 78/100 on IGN.

Alongside Cities: Skylines and Frostpunk, the game helped to gain new popularity for the city-building game genre, which was in decline since the failure of the 2013 reboot of the SimCity series. With the SimCity franchise no longer producing new games, smaller developers had a chance to provide more creative games. Shams Jorjani from Paradox Interactive said: "Things that aren’t big enough for the biggest publishers, are big enough for us, and Cities [Skylines] is an example of that. Those publishers find greener pastures, and that leaves space for us to grow." In particular, Surviving Mars provided an increased complexity to the genre, as unlike previous games bad decisions of the player can cause them to lose the game.

The city-builder game Cities: Skylines, also published by Paradox, received a free update themed around Surviving Mars. This was released to celebrate the game reaching sales of over five million, as well as its third anniversary. The new features were a new city building with a launch pad, an astronaut user in Chirper (an in-game parody of Twitter), and a new radio station, "Official Mars Radio".

Josh Tolentino from Destructoid praised the complexity of the game, as it goes into intricate details while managing the extractions of raw resources, manufacturing of complex ones, space, colonists with traits and flaws, and even natural disasters. He furthermore praised the visual style of the game, with bright and colorful buildings and domes that contrast with the dull, even if realistic, desert landscape. He pointed out that currency has a very limited use and most resources are actual resources, unlike other city builders that put a huge emphasis on the in-game currency. He also pointed out that, given the complexity and the random factors generated when starting a new map, game sessions are never the same, and even the basic survival of the colony is not guaranteed. He noted that things can seem slow and quiet, but the in-game radios can change the mood of the gameplay.

== Spin-off games ==
About a year after release, in June 2019, Haemimont signed on with Frontier Developments for development of a new property for Frontier's publishing label. Instead of releasing a sequel game, Paradox released Surviving the Aftermath in 2019, with similar mechanics but a different premise, and made by Iceflake Studios instead. A third game in the Surviving... series, Surviving the Abyss by Rocket Flair Studios, was released in 2022. In March 2021, Paradox announced that development of Surviving Mars has moved from Haemimont Games to Abstraction Games, a studio that helped develop the game Mass Effect Legendary Edition. In 2025, Paradox acquired all the shares of Haemimont Games, becoming the full owners of the game. Shortly after that, Paradox released a trailer for Surviving Mars: Pioneer, a VR game based on the original game. This spin-off game would shift the construction of a base in Mars to a first-person perspective.
