= Cities: Skylines - After Dark =

DLC for Cities: Skylines

Cities: Skylines - After Dark is the first major downloadable content (DLC) expansion pack for the construction and management simulation video game Cities: Skylines developed by Colossal Order and published by Paradox Interactive. The expansion, released on 24 September 2015, focuses on adding nightlife elements to the game.

== Gameplay ==
The expansion released alongside a free update to the game that added a day-and-night cycle.

== Reception ==
According to review aggregator Metacritic, the expansion received "generally favorable" reviews from critics. GameSpot gave the expansion a positive review, rating it 8/10, although they felt that it lacked major additions to the core gameplay. PC Gamer also gave it a positive review, rating it 80/100. They praised the new features but admitted they weren't a "major game changer". Eurogamer.pl rated it 6/10, stating that the expansion gave players the opportunity "to enjoy the game almost all over again," but left "a bit to be desired."

Rock Paper Shotgun also gave it a positive review, but noted it did not fix the existing problems of the game. The Escapist also gave it a positive review, stating, "[v]ery casual players might be satisfied with the expansion's accompanying free content, but if you're putting more than ten hours into a city (and you will) you'll want After Dark." Game Rant rated it 3.5/5, stating it was "very small in size," but provided "great gameplay additions that the hardcore fans will love." British computer magazine Micro Mart called it "[a] solid update, if lacking excitement". Computer Shopper felt it was "decent for the price," but "[didn't] add anything essential to the core experience".

In contrast, IGN gave the expansion a lesser rating of 6.5/10, calling it a "ho-hum expansion to an excellent city-builder" that felt "like an afterthought", stating "[i]t’s the kind of content that, if you weren’t looking for it, would probably take you a while to notice." They also criticized the decision to release the day-and-night cycle as a free update, feeling that it left the pack "without a defining feature to hang its hat on." Eurogamer.net also gave it a lesser review, stating that "while it makes many additions to the base game, they ultimately have little overall effect on how it plays," although they still found some of the features such as the commercial districts to be useful. Gry-Online stated in their review "[s]trange things happen in cities at night – it's no different in the case of [this expansion]". Although they spoke positively of the new features, they found it "little too high a price in relation to the contents."

Reviewers also pointed out that at the time of release, many mods developed for the game did not work with the new expansion. TheGamer ranked it first on their list of best DLCs for Cities: Skylines, while CBR ranked it ninth.
