= Lego Skylines =

Upcoming video game

- Promotional image
- Developer: Iceflake Studios
- Publisher: Paradox Interactive
- Series: Lego
- Platforms: Windows; Nintendo Switch 2; PlayStation 5; Xbox Series X/S
- Genre: City-building

Lego Skylines is an upcoming Lego-themed city-building video game developed by Iceflake Studios and published by Paradox Interactive. It is a spin-off of Cities: Skylines.

== Development ==
The title of the game was first made known in May 2026 after it was rated by South Korea's Game Rating and Administration Committee. It was officially announced at Gamescom in August 2026. The game is set to be released for Windows, Nintendo Switch 2, PlayStation 5, and Xbox Series X and Series S.
