= Crusader Kings II: Holy Fury =

2018 video game DLC

Crusader Kings 2: Holy Fury
- Developer: Paradox Development Studio
- Publisher: Paradox Interactive
- Engine: Clausewitz Engine
- Platforms: Windows, macOS
- Release: November 13, 2018
- Genre: Grand strategy
- Modes: Single-player, Multiplayer

Crusader Kings II: Holy Fury is a DLC for the grand strategy video game Crusader Kings II, developed by the Paradox Development Studio and published by Paradox Interactive. Holy Fury mainly focused around improvements to religion and the ability to create randomly generated worlds.

== Gameplay ==
Holy Fury added numerous features to Crusader Kings II. Most prominent among these were improvements to religion. Holy Fury expanded mechanics for Christian religions, including the addition of sainthood, mass conversion and coronations, as well as improved crusades. One of the additional features that was most commented on was the addition of an easter egg where the player could play in a world ruled by animals. Several different animals, both real and mythological, were made available to play as. Also included was the "Bloodlines" feature, wherein particularly prestigious characters would create a bloodline that passed prestige onto their descendants, and the ability to start in a "shattered world", where no titles higher than Duke exist.

== Development and release ==
Holy Fury was announced in May 2018. Initial marketing focused around the changes to pagan religions. The DLC was released on November 13. In its first month of release, Holy Fury received more buys than that of any other Crusader Kings 2 DLC had achieved during its first month.

== Reception ==
PC Invasion gave a positive review of the DLC, giving it 8 out of 10 and declaring that it "spice[d] up the entire game", while finding that it required other DLC in order for a player to fully use its content. Strategy Gamer also spoke positively of the DLC, declaring that it "ups the ante" and describing the bloodlines feature as "amazing", while also finding that some content was locked behind other DLCs.
