= Crusader Kings II: Sword of Islam =

2012 video game DLC

Crusader Kings 2: Sword of Islam
- Developer: Paradox Development Studio
- Publisher: Paradox Interactive
- Series: Crusader Kings II
- Release: June 26, 2012
- Genre: Grand strategy
- Modes: Single-player, multiplayer

Crusader Kings II: Sword of Islam is a downloadable content pack developed by Paradox Development Studio and published by Paradox Interactive for the grand strategy wargame Crusader Kings II. It allows the player to play as Muslim characters within the main game for the first time, and introduces a number of events and gameplay elements for those characters, such as decadence and polygamy.

== Gameplay ==
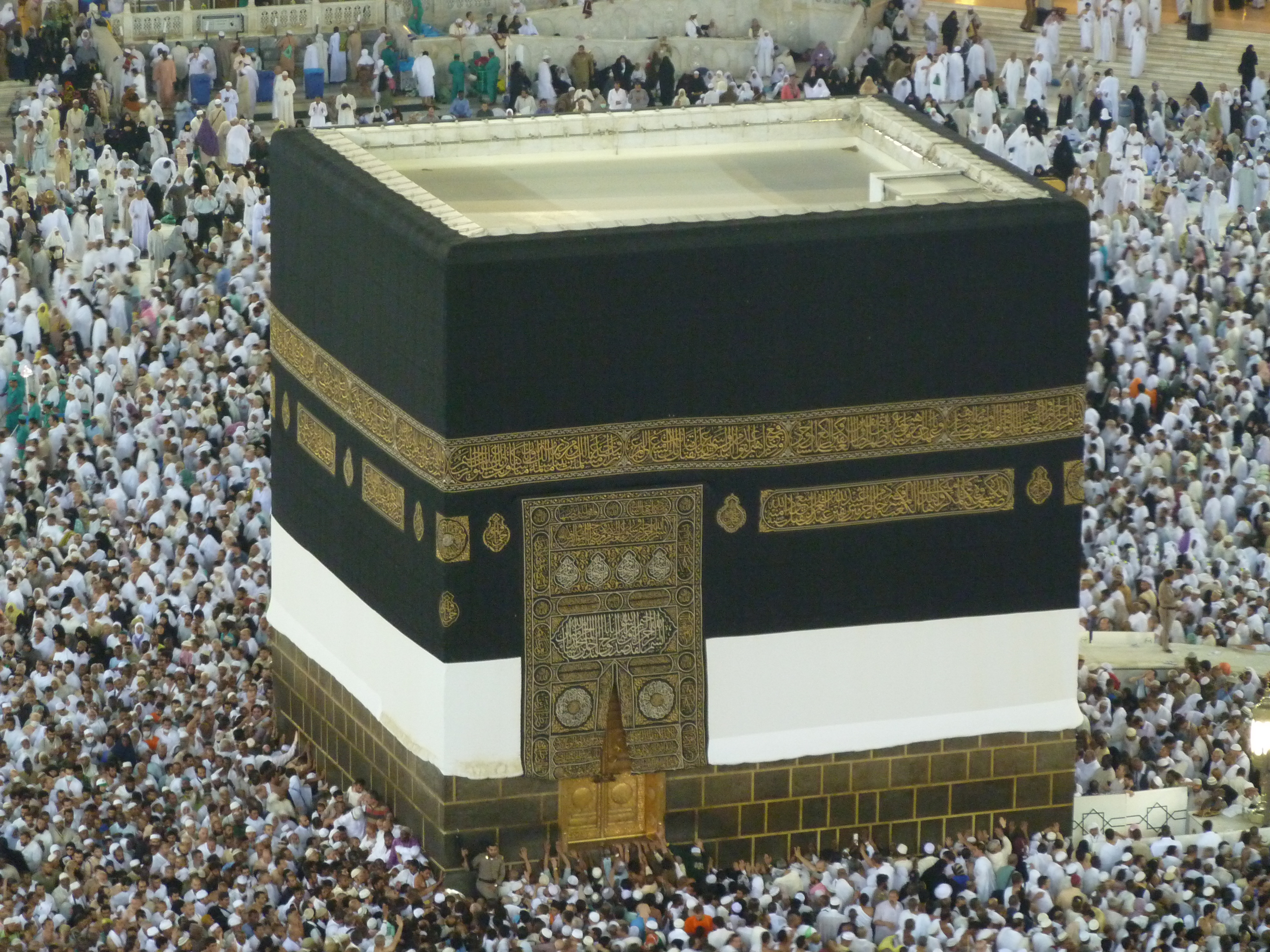
The expansion introduces the Hajj, in which the player can conduct the Tawaf around the Kaaba (pictured).

In the original game, the player can play as any Christian dynasty. Sword of Islam expands that premise, to allow the gamer to play as any of the Islamic characters in the game, and introduces new events and actions only available to the characters of those related religions. The graphical interface was re-designed for use when playing an Islamic character. The new actions include celebrating Ramadan and sending their player-character on a pilgrimage to Mecca, known as the Hajj. The level of detail given in that action includes allowing the player to decide whether the character to proudly or humbly chant while walking around the Kaaba during the Tawaf.

The expansion introduced a new gameplay attribute for Islamic characters, known as decadence. It was intended to show stagnation in a dynasty, leading to lower troop morale and tax income from their held lands. The decadence levels are generated by the number of males who do not hold titles within the family, and can build up over time. This adds a level of family management to the game, as the player can choose whether to give them territory or attempt to have them killed in order to remove the increasing levels of decadence. Further to the family management side of the game, the expansion also introduced the ability to have multiple wives for the first time, but is only allowed for Islamic religions. Should the character not have sufficient wives to match the level of their station, then it will impact on their prestige.

A non-Islamic related change in Sword of Islam was an update to the way in which the game approaches assassinations and plots. Whereas in the original game, it would display a percentage chance of having a character killed by the action, the updated mechanic has characters work together on those assassinations over time. For example, another character might suggest killing someone by using fertilizer as the basis for an explosive.

== Development and release ==
Sword of Islam was the first major expansion to Crusader Kings II. It was first announced in May 2012, to be released later that year in June. It was intended to allow players to play as Muslim characters and rulers, but also to introduce a new style of gameplay for those types of characters. The lead on the project, Henrik Fåhraeus, said that the decadence system was the hardest part of the expansion to balance correctly, but also the part that he felt proudest of.

== Reception ==
Crusader Kings II: Sword of Islam was released as downloadable content on June 26, 2012. The release of Sword of Islam coincided with a patch which changed some elements of the main game. These included an introduction of minor and major claims on land for characters, and a map extension, going further south west into Africa to add Mali and Ghana. Additional de jure empires were also introduced, such as a united British Isles forming the Britannia Empire and a united Scandinavian region forming the Empire of the same name.

In a preview piece for Kotaku, Luke Plunkett described the idea behind Sword of Islam as "awesome" due to the normal lack of opportunity to play realistic Islamic or Middle Eastern characters in video games whilst dismissing the "fairy-tale" and "cliched ideal" of Prince of Persia. James Tanaleon reviewed the expansion for Wargamer.com, and called it an "excellent and a much needed expansion". He added that it was a waste not to have Muslim characters playable in the original game, and that the expansion was a "positive step forward" for Paradox Interactive.
