= Crusader Kings II: Sons of Abraham =

2013 video game DLC

Crusader Kings 2: Sons of Abraham
- Developer: Paradox Development Studio
- Publisher: Paradox Interactive
- Series: Crusader Kings II
- Release: WW: November 18, 2013
- Genre: Grand strategy

Crusader Kings II: Sons of Abraham is a downloadable content pack developed by Paradox Development Studio and published by Paradox Interactive for the grand strategy wargame Crusader Kings II. The expansion pack created more events and interactions with the Christian, Islamic and Jewish religions within the game. There were concerns by the production staff that elements included such as the ability to expel Jews from the player-held lands and the ability to create the Kingdom of Israel could lead to criticism. Game critics were mostly positive of the game, with praise directed at the new gameplay elements introduced.

== Gameplay ==
The real-world expulsions of Jews in Europe from 1100 to 1600

The Sons of Abraham expansion increased the events and interactions with religion in Crusader Kings II. While the previous expansion pack to the game, entitled The Old Gods, was primarily about paganism, Sons of Abraham was intended to expand on Judaism, Islam and Christianity. For example, the Catholic religion is expanded by introducing the College of Cardinals, thereby increasing the interaction between the player's ruler character and the reigning Pope. It allows the Pope to choose who is admitted to become one of the nine standing Cardinals based on a number of attributes, with a preference for members of the Italian culture. Jewish characters are playable for the first time and allows the player to restore the Kingdom of Israel, build the Third Temple and bring back the Priesthood. Meanwhile, Islamic characters can choose to become members of the Mu`tazila or Ash'ari theologies, with penalties being suffered towards members of the other theology.

The expansion modifies the economy in Crusader Kings II to require greater financial upkeep. This is balanced by the ability to borrow money from either a number of holy military orders or Jewish lenders. As with the real-world Alhambra Decree, in which the joint Catholic Monarchs of Spain, Isabella I of Castile and Ferdinand II of Aragon, the game allows the player to expel the Jewish population from their held lands. This will remove all Jewish characters, default on any debts owed to Jewish money lenders, and prevent the player from borrowing any further money from those Jewish lenders in the future.

Religious heresies have been expanded to receive individual powers other than those held by the main religion in each case. For example, Catharism allows its followers to appoint women as bishops. Also, once a heresy increases in power sufficient to outnumber the orthodoxy, then the former orthodoxy becomes the heresy and vice versa. When this happens, any holy military orders which previously followed the old orthodox religion will switch to follow the former heresy. Those holy orders can also gain lands of their own, and may build castles in empty provinces in other territories.

== Development and release ==
The expansion pack was announced via Paradox Interactive's Twitch stream at 6pm GMT on October 22, 2013. It is the fifth major expansion pack for the game. The lead designer on Sons of Abraham was Henrik Fåhraeus, who said that the production team were careful about how they introduced interactions with the Jewish faith. He explained that while elements of the game were already dark, but "you do some things that you can’t do in other games, so we felt that it could be done". Regarding the ability to expel the Jewish population, Fåhraeus said that the mechanic was designed to hurt the player in the long run.

The ability to play as a Jewish character was not previously available in the game as the production team didn't consider that there were any significant Jewish rulers from 1066 onwards, but with the earlier setting beginning in The Old Gods, the Khazar Khanate was changed from following Tengrism to Judaism. This reflects the historical record of the 8th century. Fåhraeus did not fear any backlash to the inclusion of the reformation of the Kingdom of Israel, and compared it to earlier expansions where the player could reform the Roman Empire as the Byzantines or Zoroastrian characters reforming the Persian Empire.

== Reception ==
Sons of Abraham

Aggregate scores
| Aggregator | Score |
|---|---|
| GameRankings | 72% |
| Metacritic | 77% |

Review score
| Publication | Score |
|---|---|
| IGN | 7 |

Crusader Kings II: Sons of Abraham was released as downloadable content on November 18, 2013. It was brought out a week after a patch for the main game and alongside three minor downloadable content packs. The review aggregator websites GameRankings and Metacritic gave the expansion scores of 72% and 77% respectively.

While writing for IGN in Italy, Di Claudio Chianese described Sons of Abraham as building on the solid foundation formed by the original game, but he felt like it didn't go far enough in the expansion of the religions, and missed out on the chance to play as the Pope. Di Claudio opined that it would be well received by experienced gamers of Crusader Kings II.

Gaming journalist Luke Plunkett, in a preview piece for Kotaku, described Paradox Interactive as having "brass balls" due to the inclusion of Israel within the game. A review of the expansion by Edge magazine likened the experience of trying to rule as the Jewish Khazars as repetitive as the main character from the film Groundhog Day trying to save an old man. This is because in their experience, playing as Isaac of the Khazars often ended with the character dying after a few years without issue, ending the game quickly.
