= CS2 =

CS2 may refer to:

== Software and video games ==
- Counter-Strike 2, a 2023 first-person shooter computer game
- Cities: Skylines II, a 2023 city management computer game
- CS2, Adobe Creative Suite's second version, a graphic software suite

== Chemistry ==
- Carbon disulfide, CS_{2}, an inorganic compound
- Dicaesium, Cs_{2}, an allotrope of elemental caesium
- CS2, a siliconized, micro-pulverized form of CS gas

== See also ==
- CS2, the former name of a cycle route in London, now known as C2
- CS-2, a supercomputer system architecture by Meiko Scientific
- Help:Citation Style 2, a Wikipedia project page
