= Karoliina Korppoo =

Finnish game designer

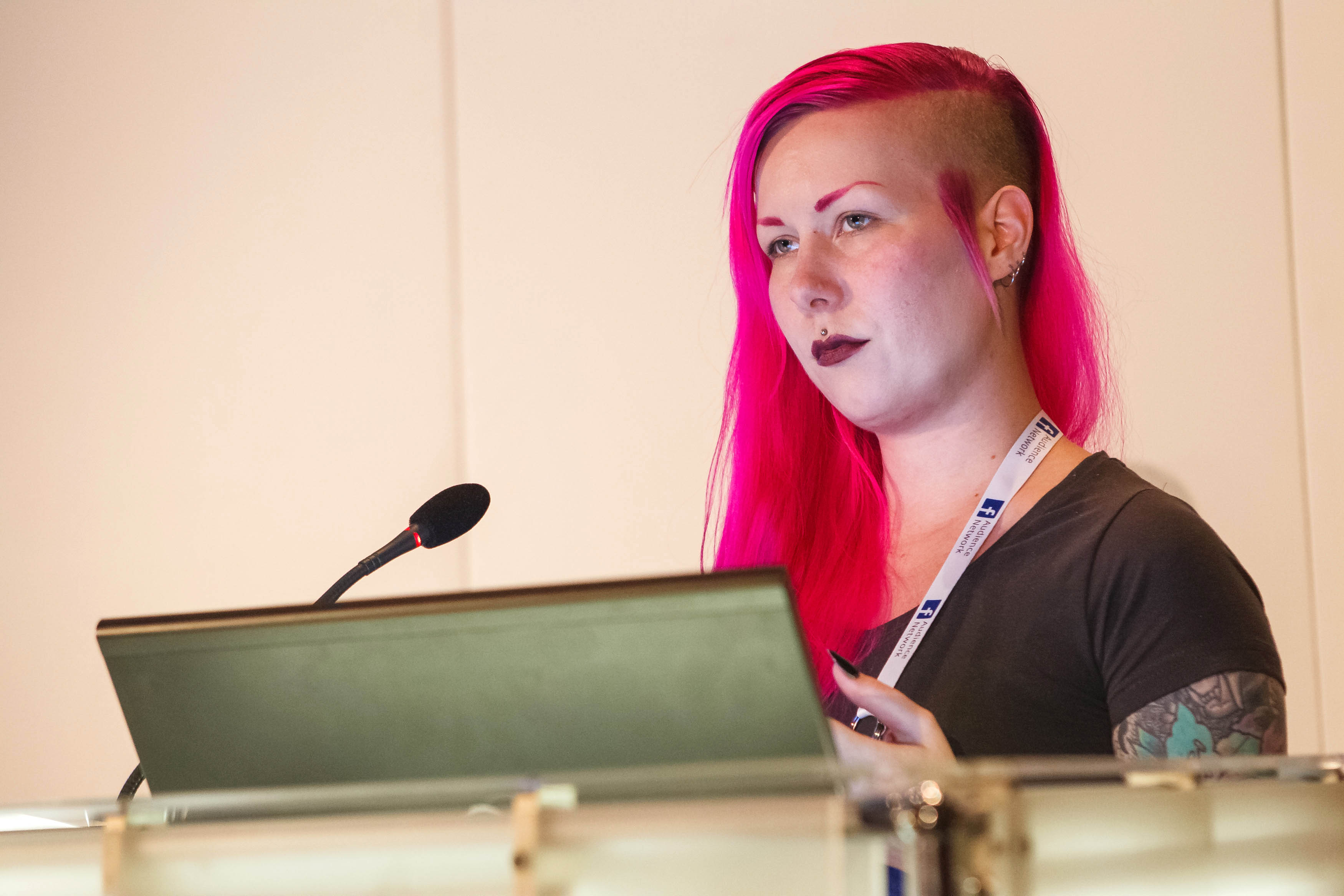
- Karoliina Korppoo in 2015
- Born: 1984 (age 41–42)
- Education: Tampere University of Applied Sciences
- Occupation: Game Designer
- Notable work: Cities in Motion; Cities in Motion 2 Cities: Skylines

Karoliina Korppoo (born 1984) is a Finnish game designer who has worked at Colossal Order and ran her own start-up company called 10th Muse from 2020 to 2022. She is known as the lead designer of the Cities: Skylines city building video game, which has sold more than 6 million copies as well as being one of the two Finns who have ever been invited to speak at a TED main conference. 10th Muse's main project was Sana Stories, a platform for writing and reading interactive stories.

Korppoo is a well-known defender of inclusiveness and equality and often speaks in public about changes in the gaming industry. She is one of the first women to become well-known in the field of game design in Finland, both in role-playing games and video games. Korppoo was the main character in the 2015 episode of the Finnish Yle's Tekijänä documentary.

== Biography ==
Korppoo has graduated from Tampere University of Applied Sciences as a graphic designer and studied for a master's degree in Tampere University's Internet and Game studies program. After graduation Korppoo has worked as a mobile game tester, game producer and graphic designer.

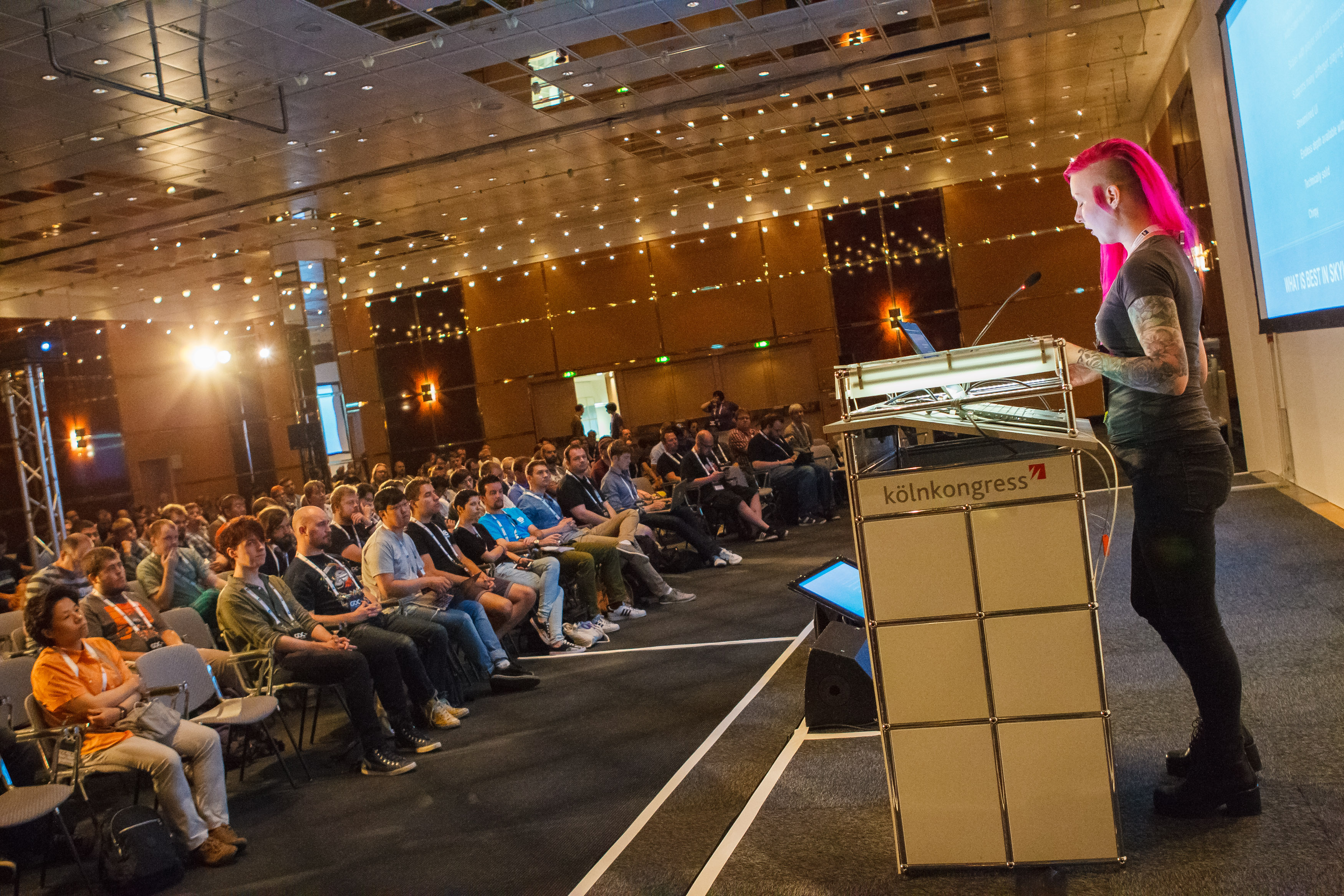
Karoliina Korppoo at the GDC Europe session

=== Colossal Order ===
She started working with Colossal Order in July 2009 as one of the two lead designers on Cities in Motion. She was also a lead designer for Cities in Motion 2 and Cities Skylines, including all DLCs until Industries.

=== 10th Muse and story games ===
After leaving Colossal Order in 2018, Korppoo started her own start-up company called 10th Muse in the role of the CEO and creative director. Aside from the interactive storytelling platform that the startup developed, Korppoo has self-published digital and physical story card games. Her works include Aulos (2008) and Invitation to Love (2010), which borrows its name from the Twin Peaks television series.

=== Events ===
Korppoo has been a speaker at the TED main event in Canada in April 2017. She has appeared at many game industry events, such as GDC Europe (2015), Pocket Gamer Connects (2018, 2019 and 2020), Aalto University Games Now lecture series (2016) and Visual Forum (2015).

== Games ==
- Cities in Motion
- Cities in Motion 2
- Cities: Skylines (all DLCs until Industries)
