= Crusader Kings II: Sunset Invasion =

2012 video game DLC

- Developer: Paradox Development Studio
- Publisher: Paradox Interactive
- Engine: Clausewitz Engine
- Platforms: Windows, macOS
- Release: November 15, 2012
- Genre: Grand strategy
- Modes: Single-player, Multiplayer

Crusader Kings II: Sunset Invasion is a DLC for the 2012 grand strategy video game Crusader Kings II, developed by the Paradox Development Studio and published by Paradox Interactive, which adds a fictional Aztec invasion of Europe to the game.

== Gameplay ==
Sunset Invasion adds a fictional event where the Aztec Empire invades Europe. The feature was created as a way to counterbalance the invasion of the Mongol Empire, which usually conquers large sections of the eastern half of the game map while leaving the west untouched. The DLC added an Aztec culture and religion to the game, as well as an "Aztec disease".

== Announcement and release ==
The DLC was announced on October 31, 2012, and released on November 15 of that year. Initial reactions to the DLC noted it as the first alternate history DLC created by the Paradox Development Studio.

== Reception ==
Sunset Invasion received mixed reviews from critics. Konstantin Fomin of Riot Pixels gave a positive review, rating it at 80% and declaring that it would "take you on a rollercoaster ride". Fraser Brown of Destructoid gave a mixed opinion on the DLC, finding it an interesting scenario while also writing that it was "more of a novelty than serious DLC". Adam Smith of Rock, Paper, Shotgun spoke tepidly of the DLC, declaring: "I'm not opposed to its existence but I doubt I'd spend much time with it". Writing in 2018, Jason Rodriguez of PC Invasion wrote negatively of Sunset Invasion, deeming it the worst Crusader Kings II DLC and declaring that it "isn't so much an expansion as it is a glorified event".
