= Cities in Motion =

2011 business simulation video game

- Developer: Colossal Order
- Publisher: Paradox Interactive
- Producer: Mariina Hallikainen
- Designers: Karoliina Korppoo; Mikko Tyni
- Programmer: Antti Lehto
- Artists: Antti Isosomppi; Mikko Tyni
- Composers: Tuomas M. Mäkelä; Ilpo Kärkkäinen; Oleksi Onttonen
- Platforms: Windows, Mac OS X, Linux
- Release: February 22, 2011: Windows; NA: February 22, 2011; EU: February 25, 2011; AU: March 24, 2011; Mac OS X; May 20, 2011; Linux; January 9, 2014
- Genre: Business simulation
- Mode: Single-player

Cities in Motion is a business simulation game developed by Colossal Order and published by Paradox Interactive.

The goal of the game is to implement and improve the public transport system in various cities. This can be achieved by building lines for buses, trams, metro trains, waterbuses, and helicopters.

It was released for Microsoft Windows in 2011. Paradox Interactive released the Mac version of Cities in Motion on May 20, 2011. A port of Cities in Motion to Linux was announced by Paradox Interactive in 2013, with it eventually arriving via Steam on January 9, 2014.

== Gameplay ==
The main objective of the game is to create a profitable transport network that provides residents access to places of work, leisure, shopping centers and residential areas in various cities. The player acts as the head of a company providing public transportation, building new transit networks and completing tasks from city residents or the mayor. Four European cities are available in the base game: Amsterdam, Berlin, Helsinki and Vienna, but other cities have been released with DLCs and more can be added with addons and the map editor.

Public transport lines in the game are closed loops of stops along which transit vehicles move. There are five types of transport in the game: bus, tram, metro, water bus and helicopter. Depending on the type of transit, structures required for the operation of the route differ. A bus route needs a few stops installed along an already built street, trams need rails and stops along them. Metro needs large stations connected with metro tracks. Water bus needs two water bus stops on water, and a helicopter needs two helipads.

Management in the game involves regulating the salaries of workers and setting fares. Increasing fares increases revenue from routes, but may reduce the number of potential passengers, who are divided in the game by social cliques. At the same time, as employee salaries increase, costs increase and the condition of vehicles improves.

There are two game modes available for the game: campaign and sandbox. The campaign mode consists of scenarios depicting historical stages of public transit development in various cities throughout the 20th century. In each scenario the player needs to complete all tasks provided by the city mayor or citizens. The player is given a certain amount of money, and can take out loans from different banks with different interest rates and earn money from the transit system. Loan payments are made monthly until the entire amount is returned to the bank. At the same time, the number of available loans is limited, so if the budget is spent inefficiently the player might go bankrupt. Sandbox mode is a free game mode; when starting the mode, the player can select the city, the starting year from 1920 to 2020 and the starting amount of money. In the sandbox mode, the player is not limited to completing scenario tasks and can build the city's transport network at the player's own discretion.

One of the game's lead designers Karoliina Korppoo has mentioned that the focus in Cities in Motion was on the citizens. Citizens divide into 7 social clique groups, each with their own public transportation preferences and needs:

- Blue-collar workers: mostly factory workers who need cheap transport.
- White-collar workers: mostly office workers who wish fast and efficient transport.
- Businesspeople: wealthy entrepreneurs and government workers who value comfortable transport.
- Students: college and university students who need cheap public transport.
- Tourists: tourists who want to see the city regardless of the transportation costs.
- Pensioners: old-aged people who need comfortable public transport.
- Dropouts: unemployed and dropouts who need cheap transport.

=== Tutorial ===
The tutorial is presented in a separate scenario with tasks containing basic instructions for controlling the camera, navigating the interface, operating the company and building routes.

=== Map editor ===
Cities in Motion has a built-in map editor that allows players to create their own city maps and edit existing ones. The editor is equipped with various tools that allow landscaping, placing trees, buildings, roads, etc. With the help of mods and addons it is possible to increase the number of available object models and expand the functionality of the editor.

== Downloadable content ==
A total of 13 downloadable content packs were released for Cities in Motion, all including a total of 58 new transport models, 9 cities and 2 new metro train station types.

DLC name	Release date	New content
Design Classics	6 April 2011	Five new modes of transportation: the "Jubilee Blim" bus, the "Livingstone Inauguration" tram, the "Arnauld Porte" subway train, the "Tiergarten Ferry" ship, and the "Skylark III" helicopter
Design Marvels	21 May 2011	Five new models of transport: buses "Dino Vettore" and "Comet Ambienta", helicopter "Roto-Tec Leopard", tram "Prospecta Experimental" and a subway train "Capitol W700 automatic"
Tokyo	1 June 2011	A map of Tokyo with its own soundtrack along with a new four-scenario campaign, seven new transport models and the new monorail transit type that replaces trams in Tokyo
Design Now	14 June 2011	1 new model of every transport type: "Stern-Berger Midi" bus, helicopter "Pavlov P-42", ship "Stingray Cityjet", tram "Vagabondo Satellite" and metro train "Crescenta T4 Suburbia"
Metro Stations	23 July 2011	2 new metro station types: crossed platform and multiplatform stations
German Cities	14 September 2011	Two new cities: Cologne and Leipzig with a new campaign
US Cities	17 January 2012	2 new cities: New York City and San Francisco, 7 new transport models and two new transit types: trolleybus instead of tram in New York and a cable car as a tram model in San Francisco
Design Dreams	29 February 2012	Five new models of transport: tram "Bergstrom Light", helicopter "LI-8", bus "Pavlov 677M", 2 metro trains "Galaxie Berliner" and "Ohm M1"
Ulm	12 April 2012	New city Ulm with its new campaign
Paris	15 May 2012	A map of Paris with a new three-scenario campaign and four new models of transport
St. Petersburg	26 July 2012	A map of St. Petersburg with a new three-scenario campaign and 5 models of trolleybuses and other transport types
London	20 November 2012	New city London with a four-scenario campaign and 5 new transport models
Design Quirks	5 February 2013	Five new models of transport: "Hot air balloon" in the form of a helicopter, ship "Amphibus", metro train "Caterpillar", tram "Lucitania" and bus "Sight-seeing Bus"

On May 19, 2011, Paradox Interactive announced Cities in Motion: Tokyo, the first expansion containing a new city with a campaign and new Monorail transport type.

A poll on the game's Facebook page made the city of Munich a free download for all users in addition to the expansion pack. During their Holiday Teaser, Paradox Interactive released a photo of the Statue of Liberty with the title Cities in Motion. U.S. Cities soon revealed in a press conference in January 2012.

== Reception ==
Reception

Aggregate score
Aggregator	Score
Metacritic	72/100

Review scores
Publication	Score
4Players	82%
Gamekult	7/10
GameSpot	7.5/10
GameStar	80%
IGN	7/10
Jeuxvideo.com	15/20
MeriStation	7/10
PC Gamer (UK)	67%
PC Games (DE)	63%
PC PowerPlay	7/10

Overall, Cities in Motion received mostly favorable reviews from reviewers and players. The review aggregation website Metacritic displays the score of Cities in Motion at 72/100. Reviews from players on the Steam platform are "mostly favorable". Among more than five hundred reviews left by users of the service, 75% are positive.

Reviewers noted that the video game has quite good graphics and soundtrack, as well as interesting gameplay, which at the same time can become too repetitive. They also believe that despite the convenient interface, the video game lacks direct passenger-player communication to show why exactly passengers are dissatisfied with a particular route. The opinions of reviewers were divided on the difficulty of the video game and its scenarios. According to some reviewers, the complexity is unduly overestimated, which leads to significant micromanagement, while for others it has become not an obstacle, but a kind of challenge. Some reviewers have noted that the game had very few playable cities in the base game.

"City maps are attractive but are lacking in atmosphere and are somewhat utilitarian, presumably to best show off the game's focus on roadways" noted Brett Todd in his review for GameSpot. In addition he has noted that the game completely lacks the day-night cycle, as well as any weather conditions. The clear and intuitive interface, as well as the complexity of game scenarios were in Todd's opinion the greatest achievements of Cities in Motion. At the same time, he emphasized the repetitiveness of the gameplay and the need for a more accurate description of passenger dissatisfaction, as well as some tips for the game: "For example, when people are mad along bus stops because of wait times, do you add more buses to the existing routes or lay down new routes?".

== Sequel ==
On August 14, 2012, at the annual Gamescom video games trade fair in Cologne, Paradox Interactive announced the sequel, named Cities in Motion 2. It was released six months later on April 2, 2013.

== See also ==
- Cities: Skylines – a full city simulator also by Colossal Order
