= Crusader Kings II =

2012 video game

- Developer: Paradox Development Studio
- Publisher: Paradox Interactive
- Director: Henrik Fåhraeus
- Producer: Johan Andersson
- Designers: Henrik Fåhraeus; Christopher King
- Programmers: Henrik Fåhraeus; Johan Lerström; Fredrik Zetterman
- Artist: Fredrik Toll
- Composer: Andreas Waldetoft
- Platforms: Microsoft Windows, OS X, Linux
- Release: Microsoft Windows; February 14, 2012; OS X May 24, 2012; Linux; January 14, 2013
- Genre: Grand strategy
- Modes: Single-player, multiplayer

Crusader Kings II is a grand strategy video game developed by Paradox Development Studio and published by Paradox Interactive. Set in the Middle Ages, the game was released on February 14, 2012, as a sequel to 2004's Crusader Kings.

Crusader Kings II attracted a wider audience than Paradox's previous games, contributing to the growth of the company. On October 18, 2019, the base game, excluding its downloadable content, became free to play. A sequel, Crusader Kings III, was released on September 1, 2020.

== Gameplay ==
Crusader Kings II is a grand strategy video game, in which the player controls a medieval dynasty from 1066, the Norman Conquest, to 1453, the Fall of Constantinople. Players are able to start at any date between September 15, 1066, to December 31, 1337. (Note: the Charlemagne DLC allows players to start as early as January 1, 769, and the Old Gods DLC gives players a January 1, 867 start date) Through the strategic use of war, marriages and assassinations, among many other things, the players work to achieve success for their dynasty.

The game depicts or mentions numerous historical figures, including William the Conqueror, Charlemagne, Genghis Khan, Harold Godwinson, Robert Guiscard, Robert the Bruce, Harald Hardrada, El Cid, Constantine X Doukas, Harun al-Rashid, Alexios I Komnenos, Richard the Lionheart, Ivar the Boneless, Alfred the Great, Baldwin I of Jerusalem, Boleslaw the Bold and Saladin, and allows for the player to choose less-significant figures such as minor dukes and counts, and for the creation of new characters with the use of the Ruler Designer downloadable content.

Success is defined solely by the player. The in-game objective is to obtain as many prestige and piety points as possible in order to surpass the various historically relevant European dynasties in a prestige ranking system (the three most prestigious ones being the Capetian, the Rurikid and the Habsburg dynasties). The game ends when the player's current character dies without an heir of the same dynasty to succeed them, when all landed titles of the count rank or above are stripped from all members of the player's dynasty (including themselves), or when the game reaches its end in 1453 (unless the player is in "observer mode", at which point the game will continue onwards).

The game employs a genetics and education system, through which children inherit many traits, culture, religion and skills from their parents and guardians. This adds an additional layer of strategy to marriages, such that a player will attempt not only to form beneficial alliances, but also to select marriage partners with strong heritable traits to maximise the quality of offspring and thus strengthen the dynasty. This requires balancing sometimes conflicting interests; for example, while one possible marriage might allow some desirable alliance to be formed with another ruler, it may require marrying a spouse with some undesirable traits. Such a trade-off can occur in the reverse as well: one possible spouse could possess highly desirable traits but yield no new alliances for the player's dynasty.

== Expansions and mods ==
Name	Release date	Accompanying patch	Description
Sword of Islam	26 June 2012	1.06	Sword of Islam allows the player to play as most Muslim rulers. Focuses on making Sunni and Shia characters unique to play as with a new UI, story events, traits, government types and decisions. The game map was expanded into the Mali region.
Legacy of Rome	16 October 2012	1.07	Legacy of Rome focuses on the Byzantine Empire, adding events and game mechanics. It adds the "Retinue" mechanic, allowing the player to maintain a standing army.
Sunset Invasion	15 November 2012	1.08	Sunset Invasion's main focus revolves around a story event in which Europe is invaded by a fictional, more technologically advanced version of the Aztecs. They can appear later in the game and have a religion and culture unique to them.
The Republic	15 January 2013	1.09	The Republic makes naval-based merchant republics playable, with their own unique playstyle centering around wealth and elections. It adds casus belli options as well as events concerning Republican politics and familial feuds.
The Old Gods	28 May 2013	1.10	The Old Gods adds a start date, 867, and makes most pagans playable with their own unique mechanics. It adds viking mechanics, revolt mechanics, adventurer claimants and a way to reform religions.
Sons of Abraham	18 November 2013	2.0	Sons of Abraham gives further depth to the three Abrahamic faiths: Christianity in particular, but also added some content for Muslims and the Jewish faith. Also adds Holy Orders for all faiths alongside events.
Rajas of India	25 March 2014	2.1	Rajas of India makes Hindu, Buddhist and Jain rulers playable. Expands the map as far east as Bengal. With Patch 2.8, Taoist rulers were added.
Charlemagne	14 October 2014	2.2	Charlemagne unlocks several improvements to narrative aspects, custom kingdoms and empires and vice royalties. The 769 start date was added focusing on the life and death of Charlemagne, with many events tailored around this.
Way of Life	16 December 2014	2.3	Way of Life improves role-playing and immersion by letting the player influence more directly the type of story events that may happen, rather than relying solely on personality traits or randomness.
Horse Lords	14 July 2015	2.4	Horse Lords allows the player to play as most nomadic characters. Overhauls the nomadic government with clan politics and events.
Conclave	2 February 2016	2.5	Conclave improves interaction with vassals, gives power to the council and overhauls the system of education for children.
The Reaper's Due	25 August 2016	2.6	The Reaper's Due improves game mechanics related to the plague, epidemics, minor diseases, prosperity and interactions with the court.
Monks and Mystics	7 March 2017	2.7	Monks and Mystics adds societies, artifacts and relics, councilor jobs and the ability to give commands to allied armies.
Jade Dragon	16 November 2017	2.8	Jade Dragon adds interactions with China, Chinese artifacts, casus bellii and rally points, along with making the Tibetan Plateau a playable area.
Holy Fury	13 November 2018	3.0	Holy Fury allows the player to "design" pagan religions upon reformation, introduces Crusade mechanics and events, mechanics for coronations, sainthood and bloodlines and includes shattered and random maps.

Expansions timeline
2012	Sword of Islam
2012	Legacy of Rome
2012	Sunset Invasion
2013	The Republic
2013	The Old Gods
2013	Sons of Abraham
2014	Rajas of India
2014	Charlemagne
2014	Way of Life
2015	Horse Lords
2016	Conclave
2016	The Reaper's Due
2017	Monks and Mystics
2017	Jade Dragon
2018	Holy Fury

=== Mods ===
Aside from the official expansion packs, third-party mods are available on sites such as the Steam Workshop.

When a Crusader Kings II (CK2) game is launched, Paradox servers collect information about the game setup such as game version, single player or multiplayer, and what mods are in use. Data collected on 23 April 2017 showed that at least 42% of users on that day had activated at least one mod. Data also reveals that multiplayer "cheat mods" are popular, too, as are graphics or GUI mods.

A few accuracy and realism mods have also been produced by fans, such as Historical Immersion Project and CK2+. A large number of total conversion mods are also available:

- A Game of Thrones, based on George R. R. Martin's A Song of Ice and Fire fantasy novels, released in May 2012, which "has long been the most popular CK2 mod".
- After the End, which is set in the 27th century in a post-apocalyptic North America, the most up-to-date version of the mod however goes by the name After the End Fan Fork Anniversary Edition.
- Elder Kings, based on Bethesda Softworks's The Elder Scrolls video game series
- Middle Earth Project, based on the works of J. R. R. Tolkien.
- When the World Stopped Making Sense, set in the Dark Ages.
- Witcher Kings, based on Andrzej Sapkowski's The Witcher series of novels, as well as CD Projekt Red's video game series.

Paradox actively encourages modding, and the developers regularly tweaked the game in order to make modding easier, furthermore there exist in-depth guides on how to mod in the Crusader Kings II wiki.

== Release and reception ==
Reception

Aggregate score
Aggregator	Score
Metacritic	82/100

Review scores
Publication	Score
GameSpot	8/10
IGN	8/10
PC PowerPlay	7/10

A demo was released on February 4, 2012, which featured four playable characters over a 20-year span. A marketing campaign for the game featured light comedy videos on the concept of the Seven Deadly Sins.

The game, based on the Clausewitz Engine, was met with generally positive reviews and has attained a metascore of 82 at Metacritic. GameSpot reviewer Shaun McInnis stated: "Through a complex system of diplomacy and backstabbing, Crusader Kings II makes every power struggle an engrossing one" and he lauded the gameplay while noting the "lackluster tutorials". IGN summed up their review by saying "an intense learning curve, but a unique strategy experience". IGN rated the gameplay and "lasting appeal" a 9/10. A reviewer for Rock, Paper, Shotgun wrote that Crusader Kings II was "probably the most human strategy game" he ever played. Rob Zacny of PC PowerPlay, who gave the game a 7/10 score, called it a "brilliant treatment of feudalism in terms of strategy and story" but also stated it "requires major investment to overcome information overload". Kotaku named the game as one of their game of the year nominees.

By September 2014, Crusader Kings II had sold more than 1 million copies, with the expansion pack and DLC sales totaling over 7 million units. This makes it Paradox's most successful release prior to the debut of Europa Universalis IV. According to Paradox Interactive, the game was played by an average of 12,500 players every day, with an average playtime of 99 hours per player.

== See also ==
- List of grand strategy video games
- List of Paradox Interactive games
- List of historical video games
