= Iceflake Studios =

Finnish video game developer

- Type: Subsidiary
- Industry: Video games
- Founded: 7 September 2007; 19 years ago
- Founders: Lasse Liljedahl; Tapani Valkonen
- Headquarters: Tampere, Finland
- Key people: Lasse Liljedahl (CEO)
- Parent: Paradox Interactive (2020–present)
- Website: www.iceflake.com

Iceflake Studios (registered as Iceflake Studios Oy) is a Finnish video game development studio that was founded in Tampere, Finland, in 2007 and was acquired by Paradox Interactive in 2020. They have developed games for desktop, mobile, and console, as well as modifications to games. They are primarily known for developing Surviving the Aftermath, and taking over development of Cities: Skylines II in early 2026.

== History ==
Iceflake Studios was co-founded by Lasse Liljedahl and Tapani Valkonen on 7 September 2007 in Tampere, Finland. Prior to their founding, they developed a game modification for Battlefield 1942 called FinnWars. They initially developed small mobile games varying from golf and pool, to a puzzle game named Pirate Treasure, and a platforming game named Panzer Jumper. Their first non-mobile game, Ice Lakes, was released on Steam in 2016.

Surviving the Aftermath was Iceflake Studios' first game to receive a metacritic score, receiving mixed reviews. Paradox Interactive, the game's publisher, posted a teaser for the game on 7 October 2019. It was announced to be in early access on 19 October 2019 at PDXCON, and was publicly released on 16 November 2021. In March 2023 Paradox announced Rebirth, the third DLC expansion pack for Surviving the Aftermath.

On 17 July 2020, Paradox announced they would be acquiring Iceflake Studios, making it their ninth internal studio. Charlotta Nilsson, the COO of Paradox at the time, said "The collaborative efforts ... with Iceflake have given us all the confidence that this is a natural fit. Surviving the Aftermath fits the Paradox portfolio perfectly" within the announcement of the acquisition.

On 17 November 2025, Paradox announced that they and Colossal Order, original developer of Cities: Skylines II, would mutually "pursue independent paths". As a result, development of Cities: Skylines II moved to Iceflake at the beginning of 2026. The announcement disclosed that Iceflake would be responsible for the planned console releases, though Paradox did not announce a delay nor an anticipated release window. Some speculate this separation was influenced by Cities: Skylines II's poor release, reception, and ongoing development issues with Colossal.

== Games ==
=== List of games ===
| Year | Title | Publisher | Platform(s) |
|---|---|---|---|
| 2012 | Epic Speed Pro | Iceflake Studios | Android, Windows Phone |
| 2012 | Panzer Jumper | Iceflake Studios | Windows Phone |
| 2013 | Pirate Treasure | Iceflake Studios | Windows Phone, Android, iOS |
| 2013 | Premium Pool | Iceflake Studios | Windows Phone, Windows 8 |
| 2014 | Pirates Don't Run | Iceflake Studios | Windows 8, Android, iOS |
| 2014 | Premium Minigolf | Iceflake Studios | Windows Phone |
| 2014 | Target Horizon | Iceflake Studios | Android |
| 2016 | Ice Lakes | Iceflake Studios | Windows, MacOS, Linux |
| 2017 | Race Arcade | Iceflake Studios | Windows, MacOS, Linux, Xbox One, PlayStation 4, Nintendo Switch |
| 2017 | Premium Pool Arena | Iceflake Studios | Windows, MacOS, Linux, PlayStation 4, Xbox One, Nintendo Switch |
| 2021 | Surviving the Aftermath | Paradox Interactive | Windows, Xbox One, PlayStation 4, Nintendo Switch |
| 2026 | Cities: Skylines II | Paradox Interactive | Windows, planned for Xbox Series X and Series S and PS5 |
| TBA | Lego Skylines | Paradox Interactive | Windows, Nintendo Switch 2, PlayStation 5, Xbox Series X/S |
