= Justin Roczniak =

American structural engineer and YouTuber

Justin Gibs Roczniak
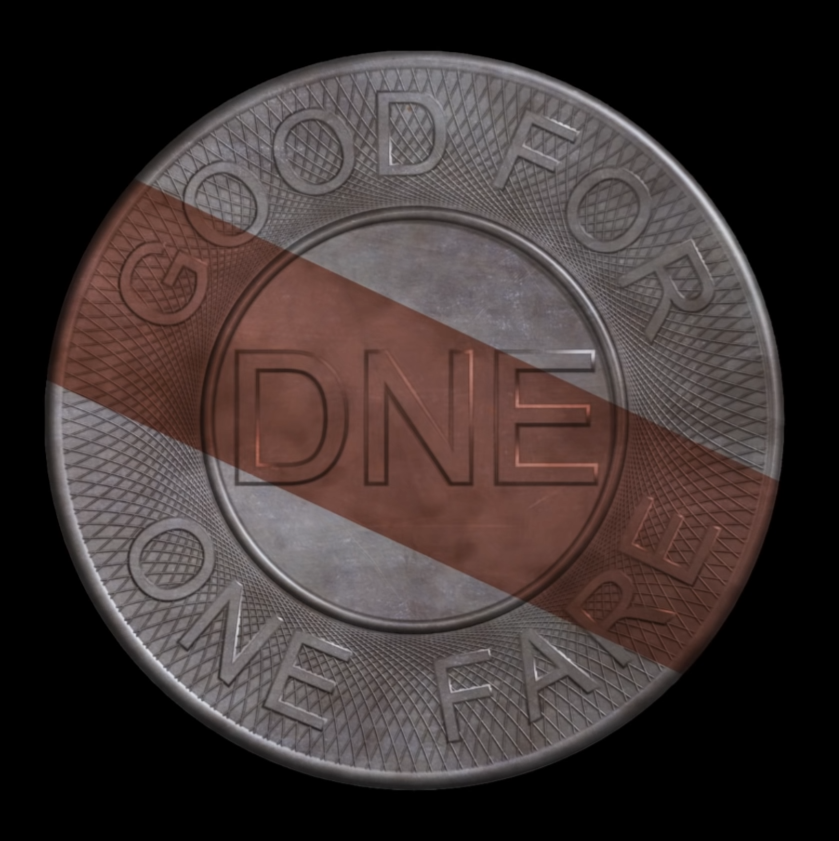
- Logo of the YouTube channel donoteat01, styled after a SEPTA transit token.
- Occupations: Structural engineer; YouTuber; podcaster

YouTube information
- Channel: donoteat01
- Years active: 2018–present

Justin Gibs Roczniak (/ˈrɒzniæk/, born March 31, 1993), also known through his YouTube alias donoteat01, is an American structural engineer, YouTuber and podcaster. He is known for his political commentary through the video game Cities: Skylines and as the co-host of podcast Well There's Your Problem.

== Personal life ==
Roczniak is a structural engineer with a degree in engineering from Drexel University. He lives in Philadelphia. He considers himself to be a socialist.

He is part of the Philly Transit Riders Union.

== YouTube career ==
On his YouTube channel donoteat01, Roczniak uploads videos on Cities: Skylines, using the game to explain the politics and power behind the construction of American cities. In the videos, he constructs case studies of urban development, discussing topics like public housing, slum clearance, and parking minimums. His main YouTube series is Franklin, where he discusses the historical development of cities through the fictional city of Franklin.

WTYP Ep 4׃ Hyatt Regency Walkway Collapse (Intro)
Start of Episode 4 of Well There's Your Problem, covering the Hyatt Regency walkway collapse, with hosts (Roczniak, November Kelly and Liam Anderson) and guest (Kate Wagner) intros

He co-hosts the engineering disaster podcast Well There's Your Problem, which was initially an offshoot of his YouTube channel. It has been characterised by Hyperallergic magazine as exposing "the darkly humorous side of capitalism destroying bridges, dams, and more" and was praised by Patrick Yocum of the Boston Ballet as being a "sarcastic and dry conversation about some of the most ridiculous and occasionally tragic accidents, blunders, miscommunications and societal failures that make the world of big engineering projects so fascinating and scary".

Although Roczniak initially intended for his videos to focus on the history first and foremost, rather than be political, he has stated that it would not be possible to discuss history in an apolitical manner, as he considers it an "absurd standard" to hold history to.

== Advocacy ==
Throughout his works, Justin Roczniak has advocated for many positions, such as increasing unionization, changes to urban design, rent control, and railroad nationalization.
