= Cities in Motion 2 =

2013 video game

- Developer: Colossal Order
- Publisher: Paradox Interactive
- Producer: Mariina Hallikainen
- Designer: Karoliina Korppoo
- Programmer: Antti Lehto
- Artist: Antti Isosomppi
- Composer: Olli Perttula
- Engine: Unity
- Platforms: Windows, OS X, Linux
- Release: 2 April 2013: Windows, OS X; NA: 2 April 2013; EU: 19 April 2013; Linux; 9 January 2014
- Genre: Business simulation
- Modes: Single-player, Multiplayer

Cities in Motion 2 is a 2013 business simulation game that was developed by Colossal Order and published by Paradox Interactive and is the sequel to the popular mass transit simulation game Cities in Motion. As with its predecessor, the goal of the game is to create efficient public transport systems in different major cities of the world. In this edition, there are several new features that the developers introduced based on community feedback about the previous game, including day/night cycles, rush hours and the ability to create timetables. The additions also include dynamic cities where players' decisions have a notable impact on city growth, and the inclusion of cooperative and competitive multi-player. The developer of Cities in Motion 2, Colossal Order, also developed Cities: Skylines, which is also a city building game with a mass transit system.

== Gameplay ==
Gameplay of Cities in Motion 2 is similar to that of its previous game Cities In Motion. The player is required to place depots around the map of which routes will run out of and end in. Routes can either be circular or run in an A-B fashion but they must always start and end at a depot. Depots have a maximum number of vehicles held inside before another vehicle has to wait in a queue until another vehicle leaves the depot and makes space for it. More vehicles can be stored in a single depot and vehicles can hold more people and be cheaper through the use of a user created ruleset which can be created or modified in an in-game ruleset editor.

The game has an extensive scenario with many missions spanning all in-game maps and custom scenarios can be created or modified using the in-game Scenario Editor. The game also has a built-in Map Editor. All custom Rulesets, Scenarios and maps can be shared via the Steam Workshop.

== Development ==
Cities in Motion 2 was announced for Linux on 3 January 2014.

== Reception ==
Reception

Aggregate scores
Aggregator	Score
GameRankings	74.43%
Metacritic	72/100

Review scores
Publication	Score
Destructoid	6.5/10
IGN	7.5/10
Hooked Gamers	6.5/10
Strategy Informer	7.5/10

Cites in Motion 2 received mixed reviews. It holds a Metacritic score of 72 (based on 15 reviews), with many critics citing the game's lack of a smooth interface and steep learning curve as the two biggest problems.
