= Cities: Skylines II =

2023 video game

- Developers: Colossal Order (until 2026); Iceflake Studios (from 2026)
- Publisher: Paradox Interactive
- Engine: Unity
- Platform: Windows
- Release: Windows; 24 October 2023; PlayStation 5, Xbox Series X/S; TBA
- Genres: City-building, construction and management simulation
- Mode: Single-player

Cities: Skylines II is a 2023 city-building game initially developed by Colossal Order, with Iceflake Studios taking over at the start of 2026, and published by Paradox Interactive. The game is a sequel to 2015's Cities: Skylines and expands upon many of its simulation factors such as simulated city and population sizes with improved traffic artificial intelligence and management schemes. It was released for Windows on 24 October 2023. A release for PlayStation 5 and Xbox Series X/S was previously planned to be released on the same day, but was later indefinitely delayed. The game received mixed reviews with praise going towards its gameplay but its harsh performance requirements and other technical flaws were criticised.

== Gameplay ==
Like its predecessor, Cities: Skylines II gives the player a virtual plot of land to create a city within. Players can lay down roads, zoning, utilities, and city services to bring in residents and businesses. The player can set city policies like tax rates, fees and ordinances to influence how the city grows, from which they also receive funds to continue to expand the city.

Initially the player is limited to nine tiles of space to build on but can expand outward by purchasing additional tiles with city funds as they achieve milestones. Whereas the first game was limited to nine tiles covering 33.1776 km^{2} (12.8099 sq mi) of area (81 tiles with user modifications) and the remastered edition to 25 tiles covering 92.16 km^{2} (35.58 sq mi), (Note: In the original Cities: Skylines, each map tile represents an area of 3.6864 km^{2} (1.4233 sq mi).) Cities: Skylines II allows players to build out to 441 tiles representing 171.33 km^{2} (66.15 sq mi) of area, meaning each individual tile is substantially smaller. (Note: In Cities: Skylines II, each map tile represents an area of 0.3885 square kilometres (0.1500 sq mi).) With a third-party modification, this can be increased to 529 tiles, which increases the available area to 205.52 km^{2} (79.35 sq mi). Unlike the previous game which was limited to around 65,000 citizens being rendered at a time, the number of citizens that can be directly simulated in Cities: Skylines II is limited only by a player's computer or console specifications. Each city can earn up to 2 billion currency units. Each map included with the game is based on a preset climate that influences weather behavior. Both the weather and the behavior of the city population follow annual and diurnal cycles, with each in-game day/night equivalent to one month of simulation time. Depending on the climate, the winter months may bring snow and other cold conditions, while summer weather may bring excessive flooding, forest fires and tornadoes. Such disasters can be mitigated with additional disaster response facilities and services within the city. Like its predecessor, Cities: Skylines II operates in a compressed time fashion.

Cities: Skylines II improved and expanded upon the city building mechanics of the first game, including fully-realized transportation and economic systems, enhanced construction and customization options, including American and European architectural themes, and advanced modding capabilities. Laying down roads now automatically places water piping and electrical conduits with them. Players have more fine-tuning control of residential zones, businesses, industrial manufacturing, and offices, including more zone types such as low rent housing and mixed-use residential/commercial. Signature buildings can be unlocked by reaching specific milestones and can impact the land value and other properties of whatever zone or city they are placed in. Rather than purely distance as in the first game, the simulated citizens use more intelligent methods to determine traffic routes, using route length, costs, comfort, and agent preference. Services like police and fire stations can also be assigned to specific districts to improve their response times, in contrast to the first game. In addition to public safety services, deathcare, education, and waste management, Cities: Skylines II also adds in services for telecommunications and welfare. These services can now be expanded through upgrades of existing locations rather than having to build a separate service building. Passenger and freight transport options are more flexible, allowing for importing and exporting to other virtual cities, and rather than unlocking certain transport options based on city size, Cities: Skylines II has a technology tree on which players can spend development points to advance and unlock desired transport options.

== Development ==
Cities: Skylines II was revealed on 6 March 2023, as part of the Paradox Announcement Show 2023. Adding to the base game, eight separate downloadable content packs were already slated for release, including the San Francisco Set, Beach Properties Asset Pack, two Content Creator Packs, the Bridges & Ports Expansion, and three Radio Stations in the Ultimate Edition option on the Windows, Xbox and PlayStation online distribution apps. According to Colossal Order, Cities: Skylines II was originally planned to be launched in late 2020, but various issues encountered in development delayed the release. Cities: Skylines II uses the Unity engine, like its predecessor. On 17 November 2025, Colossal Order announced the end of its involvement in the development of Cities: Skylines II. Future development of the game and the Cities Skylines franchise was moved to Iceflake Studios.

Unlike the first game, Cities: Skylines II was originally targeted to launch on both computers and consoles at the same time, but on 28 September 2023, Paradox Interactive announced that the console versions would not ship as expected on 24 October and that their release had been delayed to spring 2024. Preorders for the console releases were closed and all existing preorders were refunded. Colossal Order explained that the delay was to allow time to improve the quality of console gameplay and the optimisation of both console and Windows versions. Additionally, they also announced an increase to the minimum specifications requirements of the Windows version. In the week prior to the Windows release, Colossal Order stated that the game's performance may not be up to expectations at launch, but that they had planned a series of patches aimed at improving it. According to Paradox Interactive in 2024, they have struggled with optimizing the game to a playable level for console. In July 2024, Paradox announced a further delay for console versions, due to stability and performance problems.

=== User modifications ===
Colossal Order stated in October 2023 that while the game would support modding like the first game, mods would only be available through the Paradox Mods library, which allows for cross-platform support, rather than through the Steam Workshop that the first game had used. Mods can tweak settings and mechanics which normally cannot be changed in-game, as well as add new maps and assets. At least eight building style packs, which were developed by popular content creators from the first game, will be made available for free through Paradox Mods. Mod support was not offered to everyone at the time of release, per Paradox's announcement. Paradox Mods was released on 25 March 2024.

=== Downloadable content ===
As of April 2025, there are thirteen DLCs (downloadable content) for the game. In April 2024, Colossal Order and Paradox Interactive released a joint statement addressing the criticism from the release of the Beach Properties DLC, pulling it from the Steam storefront and offering refunds to its owners. In addition, Ultimate Edition buyers were offered three additional creator packs and three more radio stations. The statement pledged to focus on improving the base game and modding tools and providing free patches and updates before spending more time on paid content.

== Reception ==
Reception

Aggregate score
Aggregator	Score
Metacritic	(PC) 74/100

Review scores
Publication	Score
Game Informer	7.5/10
GamesRadar+	2/5
GameStar	74%
IGN	6/10; 8/10 (Italia)
PC Gamer (US)	77%
PC Games (DE)	6/10
PCGamesN	7/10
Shacknews	8/10
VideoGamer.com	8/10

=== Critical reception ===
Cities: Skylines II received "mixed or average" reviews from critics, according to review aggregator website Metacritic. The game was nominated for "Best Sim / Strategy Game" at The Game Awards 2023.

Leana Hafer from IGN said that although it has new enjoyable systems, the game can get better with post-launch content, stating "it feels like playing a beta, or a very early Early Access game." Ed Smith from PCGamesN describes how initial peaceful gameplay gave way to "supreme frustation and rage". In his Cities: Skylines II review, which scores the game seven out of ten, he concludes: "Something personal is lost in its larger scale while performance problems spoil the beauty, but this could one day become the superior city building game." Smith compared Skylines II to SimCity (2013), saying that both games experienced similar playability and performance issues. In an April 2024 retrospective, Rock Paper Shotgun said the performance had improved to tolerable levels but still needed more work. Despite issues with stuttering, their tests showed a two-fold improvement of frame rates in some cases.

The first DLC to be released for Cities: Skylines II, called Beach Properties, received near-universal negative reviews from players. Only 4% of the Steam reviews were positive three days post-release. Many of these reviews cited the lack of beaches and high price-to-content ratio as reasons for disappointment. In response, the Cities: Skylines II team apologized and announced plans to make this content a free add-on, issue refunds, and pledged to focus on gameplay issues before releasing more DLC.

=== Technical issues ===
In the days following the launch, the game received "mixed" reviews from players, with the majority of the reviewers criticizing the game's various performance issues and noticeable bugs. Since its release in 2023, Paradox has failed to shift public perception regarding the game, with the majority of community reviews in 2024 being negative on Steam. In the eighth edition of the Cities: Skylines II developer diary, Philip Hallikainen of Paradox said that "feedback has risen to toxic levels". The Beach Properties DLC received negative reviews from players who criticized its lack of meaningful additions and the studio's focus on creating paid expansions instead of improving the state of the game.

One issue that the community noticed was that each simulated citizen has their teeth rendered in full detail. Due to the fact that the citizens never open their mouths and the camera is usually positioned far away, the teeth are never visible. Developers confirmed this fact and stated that this does not contribute to the performance in any significant way. In 2023, Colossal Order announced plans to address performance issues, including those related to characters' teeth.

=== Sales ===
At launch, the game reached more than 100,000 concurrent players on Steam. In February 2024, Paradox stated that the game had sold more than 1 million copies.
