= Micro Mart =

British computer magazine

- Editor: Anthony Enticknap
- Categories: Computing
- Frequency: Weekly
- Circulation: 5,422 (Jan–Dec 2015)
- Founded: 1985
- Final issue: December 2016
- Company: Dennis Publishing Ltd.
- Country: United Kingdom
- Language: English
- Website: www.micromart.co.uk/
- ISSN: 1473-0251

Micro Mart was a weekly computer magazine published in the United Kingdom by Dennis Publishing Ltd. As of 2015, it had a circulation of 5,422. In a letter to subscribers in December 2016 it was announced that the magazine would cease publication with issue No 1445 (published just after Christmas 2016): "After 30 amazing years of telling it like it is, Micro Mart magazine is logging off."

The magazine contained news, reviews, articles, and classified adverts covering many popular areas of computing (both in hardware and software areas). The magazine's articles are targeted at many different levels of expertise, from beginners' tasks (such as working with Word documents, setting up a simple wireless network, or building a water-cooled PC) to more advanced articles (such as working with Linux kernels or becoming a shareware author).

The magazine was also notable for being the only publication in the UK to still regularly cover the Amiga market, as most magazines have abandoned coverage of the format in the years following the collapse of Commodore.

== History ==
Micro Mart was launched in November 1985 as a fortnightly publication called Micro Computer Mart consisting of classified advert listings for the computer trade. The magazine soon expanded in editorial content to include articles and reviews from many realms of computing. It became popular with both amateur and professional system builders. In 1991, due to reader demands, Micro Mart moved to a weekly format.

On 14 November 2002 (issue 723) the magazine moved to a full-colour format, having previously been printed in black and white. At this time, Micro Mart also expanded in content (for example Ask Jason moved from 1 to 2 pages).

Since then, the magazine celebrated its 30th birthday, its 1,400th issue and had several design changes, the most recent in 2011.

Micro Mart was initially published by MicroMart (UK) Ltd. Owners Stewart Somerville and Roy Perrin, along with Stewart's wife Fiona, controlled publication and distribution of the magazine until 28 February 1995 when Trinity Publications (a subsidiary of the Trinity Mirror group) bought the company. The headquarters was in Birmingham. On 12 June 2006 the magazine was bought by Dennis Publishing Ltd. after a deal brokered by Ian Savage Publishing. The magazine joined the ranks of titles such as Computer Shopper, PC Pro, and Custom PC.

The magazine was under the editorship of Anthony Enticknap, whose leadership in recent years saw the magazine solidifying its sales and readership figures at a time when traditional print media was being squeezed by the Internet. The magazine was overseen by Simon Brew.

== Identity ==
Micro Mart had several quirks that helped to give it an identity. For example, the disclaimer printed at the end of the magazine was ended with a short insight into the news and events in the editorial office. One feature of Micro Mart was the images of the regular experts placed alongside their columns.

As well as this, there were several other quirky additions to the magazine that did not contribute to the 'normal' content. For example, a regular feature of the news section was Tales from the Towers (Micro Mart Towers being the pet name for the editorial offices used by magazine staff and contributors). Written by staff writer Michelle, this section gave a light-hearted look at the week's events in the editorial office. When the offices moved from Birmingham to London and Michelle left the team, TFTT became Tales from the Shed written by editor Simon Brew for a while, but was not included in the magazine.

The magazine was the only English-language commercial magazine to still have a regular section dedicated to the Amiga (this article celebrated its tenth birthday). This came about after readers requested such coverage and after several requests the Amiga section was launched.

Many sections in the magazine were devoted to reader contributions. The regular caption competition invited readers to submit a caption for a computing-related image. A less regular addition was called Readers' dives. As the name suggests, this feature printed images of readers' computer rooms (or dives). One section that gained more response was the Windows Crashing feature, where readers sent in pictures of Microsoft Windows going wrong in public places (such as cash machines or photo booths). This particular feature was replaced on one occasion with 'EVE Online Crashing', a news story/user submission hybrid featuring a crash occurring during the advert break of an EVE online Tournament.

In late 2005, the editorial team introduced readers' reviews. This section was intended for reviews of computer products submitted by readers, but a lack of response caused it to die out after a few months.

Micro Mart had a commitment to involving readers as much as possible in the publication. Many of the lead articles were written by readers, and for some this led to them pursuing a career in journalism.

== Online community ==
Micro Mart also had a large online community based on the website's forums. There were slightly over 10,000 registered users (although a much smaller number regularly contributed). The forum was divided up to cover several topic sections (such as retro computing, Linux or gaming) and had a core group of contributors who answered questions and queries. The board was moderated by volunteers who each monitored different sections.

The Micro Mart chat room was connected to the forums, most regularly used between midnight and 2am every night by certain forum users and moderators. There was also a monthly early evening meeting organised by Jason D'Allison (from the Ask Jason magazine column) where he answered questions. However, in October 2008 Jason D'Allison announced that the chatroom had "run its course", and the final official monthly meet was held in December 2008.

A Micro Mart blog was set up in October 2005 but was abandoned quite quickly. After the move to Dennis Publishing, some new members of the Micro Mart editorial team attempted to revive it, but it was only updated sporadically.

== Editorial staff ==
Editor: Anthony Enticknap

Bonus John: John Moore

Designer: Laura Jane Gunnion

== Sections ==
A list of regular sections (inc. editorial) in the magazine, listed in accordance with the magazine's layout:

- Features – A variety of articles on a wide range of computer-related subjects produced by freelance writers. They usually consist of a single lead story as well as several (approximately eight each week) other pieces.
- On Test – Reviews and comparisons of computing hardware, software, and peripherals

Group Test – Weekly group test of computer hardware/software. Recent tests include office suites, a roundup of the latest motherboards and AM2 processors. The rating system takes into account quality and value (with each being marked out of 10), from these an overall mark (again out of 10) is awarded. At the end of the roundup the overall best product is awarded Editors choice whilst the runner up receives a Highly recommended.
Reviews – General reviews of the latest computer hardware/software. The products are reviewed by a variety of freelance reviewers and awarded marks out of 10 in the same way as the group tests.

- News and Views – News, editorial, and letters from the PC world
- Specialists – Commentary by six experts on computing fields of interest

Beginners' Linux Mart (defunct) – Tips for using Linux for the first time, replaced in issue 1068 by Linux News
Linux Mart (was "Linux News") – Latest News from the Global Linux Community
Amiga Mart – Amiga-related news and views, celebrated its tenth Anniversary in issue 1068 (now very other issue, and thus fortnightly.)
Mac Mart – Apple-related news and views (alternates with "Amiga Mart" and is thus fortnightly.)
Mobile Mart – Phone and Tablet news and views
Retro Mart (defunct) – Retro gaming and old computers
Hardware Mart (was "System Builder") – Advice and tips from a professional PC builder
Gaming Mart (was "Gaming Weekly") – Weekly coverage of gaming news, containing separate columns for both online and offline news.

- Classified Ads – Free classified adverts notable people who was quite active was pcmadness AKA (David) of www.modulewebdesign.com
- Experts – Expert Q&A pages from two contributors

Ask Jason – Technical computer questions
Ask Aaron – General system building/software questions
Ask Gordon (defunct) – Programming and web development questions
Ask James (defunct) – Internet security questions

- Logging Off... – A regular contributor ends the magazine with a short commentary/editorial piece.

XWord – A crossword puzzle with computing terms
