= Cities: Skylines =

2015 city-building video game

- Developers: Colossal Order (until 2024); Tantalus Media (from 2024) (Note: Tantalus Media ported the game to consoles, and took over Windows development from October 2024.)
- Publisher: Paradox Interactive
- Producer: Mariina Hallikainen
- Designers: Karoliina Korppoo; Henri Haimakainen; Miska Fredman
- Programmers: Antti Lehto; Damien Morello
- Artist: Antti Isosomppi
- Composers: Jonne Valtonen; Jani Laaksonen
- Engine: Unity
- Platforms: Windows; macOS; Linux; Xbox One; PlayStation 4; Nintendo Switch; Google Stadia; PlayStation 5; Xbox Series X/S; Nintendo Switch 2
- Release: Linux, macOS, Windows; 10 March 2015; Xbox One; 21 April 2017; PlayStation 4; 15 August 2017; Nintendo Switch; 13 September 2018; Google Stadia; 17 May 2022; PS5, Xbox Series X/S; 15 February 2023; Nintendo Switch 2; 28 October 2026
- Genres: City-building, construction and management simulation
- Mode: Single-player

Cities: Skylines is a 2015 city-building game developed by Colossal Order and published by Paradox Interactive. The game is a single-player open-ended city-building simulation. Players engage in urban planning by controlling zoning, road placement, taxation, public services, and public transportation of an area. They also work to manage various elements of the city, including its budget, health, employment, traffic, and pollution levels. It is also possible to maintain a city in a sandbox mode, which provides more creative freedom for the player.

Cities: Skylines is a progression of development from Colossal Order's previous Cities in Motion titles, which focused on designing effective transportation systems. While Colossal felt they had the technical expertise to expand the Cities gameplay into a more full-featured city simulation game, their publisher Paradox Interactive initially held off on the idea, fearing the market dominance of the SimCity series. However, they reconsidered after the critical failure of the 2013 SimCity game, which provided an opportunity for Paradox to establish a competing franchise. Colossal's goal was to create a game engine capable of simulating the daily routines of nearly a million unique citizens, while presenting this to the player in a simple way, allowing the player to easily understand various problems in their city's design. This includes realistic traffic congestion, and the effects of congestion on city services and districts. Since the game's release, various expansions and other DLC have been released for the game. The game also has built-in support for user-generated content.

The game was first released for the Windows, macOS, and Linux operating systems on 10 March 2015. Console ports by Tantalus Media were released for the Xbox One and PlayStation 4 game consoles in 2017, for the Nintendo Switch in September 2018, and for Google Stadia in May 2022. A remastered edition, also by Tantalus, was released for the PlayStation 5 and Xbox Series X/S in February 2023. An expanded edition is set to release for Nintendo Switch 2 in October 2026. The game received favourable reviews from critics, and was a commercial success, with more than twelve million copies sold on all platforms as of June 2022.

A sequel, Cities: Skylines II, was released on 24 October 2023 to mixed reviews.

== Gameplay ==
Cities: Skylines allows for construction of cities, buildings, and a variety of transportation options.

The player starts with a plot of land – equivalent to a 2-by-2-kilometre (1.2 mi × 1.2 mi) area – along with an interchange exit from a nearby highway, access to a body of water, as well as a starting amount of in-game money. The player proceeds to add roads and residential, industrial and commercial zones, and basic services like power, water and sewage, to encourage residents to move in and supply them with jobs.

As the city grows beyond certain population tiers, the player unlocks new city improvements, including schools, fire stations, police stations, health care facilities and waste management systems, tax and government edicts, mass transit systems, and other features for managing the city. One such feature enables the player to designate parts of their city as districts. Each district can be configured by the player to restrict the types of developments permitted or to enforce specific regulations within the district's bounds, such as only allowing for industrial sectors devoted to agriculture, offering free public transportation for the district to reduce traffic, raising or reducing taxes for the various classes of development, or, with the Green Cities DLC, discouraging fossil-fuel vehicles from entering a district while not discouraging electric vehicles, reducing noise pollution caused by traffic.

Buildings in the city have various development levels that are met by improving the local area, with higher levels providing more benefits to the city. For example, a commercial store will increase in level if nearby residents are more educated, which in turn will allow it to hire more employees and increase tax revenue for the city. When the player has accumulated enough residents and money, they can purchase neighbouring plots of land, each equivalent in size to the starting land area, allowing them to build up eight additional parcels out of 25 within a 10-by-10-kilometre (6.2 mi × 6.2 mi) area. The parcel limitation is to allow the game to run across the widest range of personal computers, but players can use Steam Workshop modifications to open not only all of the game's standard 25-tile building area, but the entire map (81 tiles, 324 square kilometres or 125 square miles).

The game is rendered using tilt shift effects to give an impression of scope for the simulation.

The game also features a robust transportation system based on Colossal Order's previous Cities in Motion, allowing the player to plan out effective public transportation for the city in order to reduce traffic congestion and generate transit revenue. Roads can be built straight or free-form, and the grid used for zoning adapts to the shape of the adjacent roads; cities do not need to follow a square grid plan. Roads of varying widths (up to major freeways) accommodate different traffic volumes, and variant road types (for example, avenues lined with trees or highways with sound barriers) offer reduced noise pollution or increased property values in the surrounding area at an increased cost to the player. The road system can be augmented with various forms of public transportation such as buses, taxis, trams, trains, ferries, and metro systems.

Modding, via the addition of user-generated content such as buildings or vehicles, is supported in Cities: Skylines through the Steam Workshop. The creation of an active content-generating community was stated as an explicit design goal. The game includes several pre-made terrains to build on, and also includes a map editor to allow users to create their own maps, including the use of real-world geographic features. Mods are also available to affect core gameplay elements; pre-packaged mods include the ability to bypass the aforementioned population tier unlock system (Unlock All), unlimited funds, and a higher difficulty setting.

== Development ==
Finnish developer Colossal Order, a thirteen-person studio at the time Cities: Skylines was released, had established its reputation with the Cities in Motion series, which primarily dealt with constructing transportation systems in pre-defined cities. They wanted to move from this into a larger city simulation like the SimCity franchise, and in preparation, developed Cities in Motion 2 using the Unity game engine to assure they had the capability to develop this larger effort. They pitched their ideas to their publisher, Paradox Interactive, but these initial pitches were focused on a political angle of managing a city rather than planning of it; the player would have been mayor of the city and set edicts and regulations to help their city grow. Paradox felt that these ideas did not present a strong enough case as to go up against the well-established SimCity, and had Colossal Order revise their approach.

The situation changed when the 2013 version of SimCity was released, and was critically panned due to several issues. Having gone back and forth with Colossal Order on the city simulation idea, Paradox used the market opportunity to greenlight the development of Cities: Skylines.

One goal of the game was to successfully simulate a city with up to a million residents. To help achieve this goal, the creators decided to simulate citizens navigating the city's roads and transit systems, to make the effects of road design and transit congestion a factor in city design. In this, they found that the growth and success of a city was fundamentally tied to how well the road system was laid out. Colossal Order had already been aware of the importance of road systems from Cities in Motion, and felt that the visual indication of traffic and traffic congestion was an easy-to-comprehend sign of larger problems in a city's design.

To represent traffic, Colossal Order developed a complex system that would determine the fastest route available for a simulated person going to and from work or other points of interest, taking into account available roads and public transit systems nearby. This simulated person would not swerve from their predetermined path unless the route was changed mid-transit, in which case they would be teleported back to their origin instead of calculating a new path from their current location. If the journey required the person to drive, a system of seven rules regulated their behaviour in traffic and how this was shown to the user, such as skipping some rules in locations of the simulation that had little impact while the player was not looking at those locations. This was done to avoid cascading traffic problems if the player adjusted the road system in real time. The city's user-designed transportation system creates a node-based graph used to determine these fastest paths and identifies intersections for these nodes. The system then simulates the movement of individuals on the roads and transit systems, accounting for other traffic on the road and basic physics (such as speed along slopes and the need for vehicles to slow down on tight curves), in order to accurately model traffic jams created by the layout and geography of the system. The developers found that their model accurately demonstrates the efficiency, or lack thereof, of some less common roadway intersections, such as the single-point urban interchange or the diverging diamond interchange.

== Release ==
Cities: Skylines was announced by publisher Paradox Interactive on 14 August 2014 at Gamescom. The announcement trailer emphasized that players could "build [their] dream city," "mod and share online" and "play offline"—the third feature was interpreted by journalists as a jab at SimCity, which initially required an Internet connection during play. Skylines uses an adapted Unity engine with official support for modding. The game was released on 10 March 2015, with Colossal Order committed to continuing to support the game after release. Tantalus Media assisted Paradox in porting the game to the Xbox One console and for Windows 10, which was released on 21 April 2017. This version includes the After Dark expansion bundled with the game, and supports all downloadable content. Tantalus also ported the game and the After Dark expansion for PlayStation 4, released on 15 August 2017. Both Xbox One and PlayStation 4 versions received physical release versions distributed by Koch Media. Tantalus also ported the game for the Nintendo Switch, which was released on 13 September 2018 and included the After Dark and Snowfall expansions.

The game was built from the ground up to be friendly to player-created modifications, interfacing with Steam Workshop. Colossal Order found that with Cities in Motion, players had quickly begun to modify the game and expand on it. They wanted to encourage that behaviour in Cities: Skylines, as they recognized that modding ability was important to players and would not devalue the game. Within a month of the game's release, over 20,000 assets had been created in the Workshop, including modifications that enabled a first-person mode and a flying simulator. As of February 2020, over 200,000 user-created items were available. Many of these fans have been able to use crowd-funding services like Patreon to fund their creation efforts. Paradox, recognizing fan-supported mods, started to engage with some of the modders to create official content packs for the game starting in 2016. The first of these was a new set of art deco-inspired buildings created by Matt Crux. Crux received a portion of the sales of the content from Paradox.

An educational version of Cities: Skylines was developed by Colossal Order in conjunction with the group TeacherGaming and released in May 2018. This version includes tutorials and scenarios designed for use in a classroom, as well as a means for teachers to track a student's progress.

=== Remastered edition ===
A remastered version of Cities: Skylines was released exclusively for PlayStation 5 and Xbox Series X/S on 15 February 2023. The upgraded version includes a building area of up to 25 tiles, performance enhancements and other quality of life improvements. The upgrade released as a free download to players who previously owned the PlayStation 4 and Xbox One versions, respectively.

=== VR version ===
A virtual reality adaptation of the game titled Cities: VR, developed by Fast Travel Games, was released for Meta Quest 2 on 28 April 2022 and released on PlayStation VR2.

=== Expanded edition ===
An expanded version for Nintendo Switch 2, titled Cities: Skylines – Expanded Edition, is set to release on October 28, 2026.

== Reception ==
Reception

Aggregate score
Aggregator	Score
Metacritic	(PC) 85/100 (PS4) 81/100 (XONE) 81/100 (NS) 67/100

Review scores
Publication	Score
Destructoid	9/10
Game Informer	8.75/10
GameSpot	8/10
IGN	8.5/10
PC Gamer (US)	86/100
The Escapist	5/5

Upon release, Cities: Skylines received "generally positive" reception from critics, according to review aggregator Metacritic. IGN awarded the game a score of 8.5 and said "Don't expect exciting scenarios or random events, but do expect to be impressed by the scale and many moving parts of this city-builder." Destructoid gave the game a 9 out of 10 with the reviewer stating, "Cities: Skylines not only returns to the ideals which made the city-building genre so popular, it expands them. I enjoyed every minute I played this title, and the planning, building, and nurturing of my city brought forth imagination and creativity from me like few titles ever have." The Escapist gave Cities: Skylines a perfect score, noting its low price point and stated that despite a few minor flaws, it is "the finest city builder in over a decade."

Much critical comparison was drawn between SimCity and Cities: Skylines, with the former seen as the benchmark of the genre by many, including the CEO of Colossal Order. When the game was first announced, journalists perceived it as a competitor to the poorly received 2013 reboot of SimCity, describing it as "somewhat ... the antidote to Maxis' most recent effort with SimCity" and "out to satisfy where SimCity couldn't." A Eurogamer article touched upon "something of a size mismatch" between developer Colossal Order (then staffed by nine people) and Maxis, and their respective ambitions with Skylines and SimCity. Critics generally considered Cities: Skylines to have superseded SimCity as the leading game of the genre, with The Escapist comparing the two on a variety of factors and finding Cities: Skylines to be the better game in every category considered. However, some critics did consider the absence of disasters and random events to be something that the game lacked in comparison to SimCity, as well as a helpful and substantial tutorial. Disasters were added to the game in the aptly titled Natural Disasters DLC, as well as special buildings for detecting and responding to them.

The city government of Stockholm, where Paradox's headquarters are located, used Cities: Skylines to plan a new transportation system. The developer of Bus Simulator 18 planned out the roads and highways of the game's world map through Cities: Skylines before recreating it within their game to provide a seemingly realistic city and its facilities for the game. A Polish YouTuber recreated an interchange which was due to be built near Kraków in the game, showcasing its issues such as causing congestion and multiple lane-switching. In response, the Polish General Directorate for National Roads and Highways ordered additional analysis, which confirmed the issues and the interchange was redesigned.

In 2020, Rock, Paper, Shotgun rated Cities: Skylines the fourth best management game on the PC. During the 19th Annual D.I.C.E. Awards, the Academy of Interactive Arts & Sciences nominated Cities: Skylines for "Strategy/Simulation Game of the Year".

=== Sales ===
Cities: Skylines has been Paradox's best-selling game. Within 24 hours, 250,000 copies had been sold; within a week, 500,000 copies; within a month, one million copies; and on its first anniversary, the game had reached two million copies sold. By its second anniversary, the game had reached 3.5 million sales. In March 2018, it was revealed that the game had sold more than five million copies on the PC platform alone. On the game's fourth anniversary in March 2019, Colossal Order announced that Cities: Skylines had surpassed six million units sold across all platforms. In June 2022, it was announced that the game had sold 12 million copies on all platforms. It is the best-selling Finnish-developed game to date.

=== Research ===
Research has examined using Cities: Skylines as a potential teaching tool for many different academic subjects, including real estate, environmental science, urban planning, and even news and journalism.

The marketing behind the game also encouraged people to view it as an educational tool in part through its video series "city builders", which also promoted Justin Roczniak's educational series, which uses Cities: Skylines as visual aid.

== Downloadable content ==
Cities: Skylines has received several paid and free downloadable content packs since its release in 2015, and multiple types of content packs have been released: expansion packs, cosmetic packs, content creator packs, flavour packs, music packs, and map packs. Downloadable content for the game was previously developed and released for the PC versions of the game first before being released on consoles a few months later. Newer DLC has since been released simultaneously on both PC and consoles.

=== Expansion packs ===
Name	Release date / pack summary
After Dark	24 September 2015
After Dark	Adds new unique buildings, including a casino and a luxury hotel, and settings for expanded tourism and leisure specializations. Alongside the DLC, a free update was released that adds a day-night cycle into the game, as well as a few features that take the day-night cycle into account.
Snowfall	18 February 2016
Snowfall	Adds snow and other winter-themed elements, as well as trams. Alongside the DLC, a free update introduced a theme editor that allows players to create visually different worlds, such as an alien landscape. These customized game maps could then be uploaded to the Steam Workshop for download by other players.
Natural Disasters	29 November 2016
Natural Disasters	Introduces natural disasters to the game, in addition to new disaster response and recovery services that the player could add to their city. A free update released alongside this DLC added new features such as a scenario editor and in-game radio stations.
Mass Transit	18 May 2017
Mass Transit	Introduces more diverse options for the game's mass transit systems, such as ferries, cable cars, blimps, monorails and improved commuter hubs, among other additional assets. A free update released alongside the DLC added things such as the ability to set custom names for individual streets in the game, and the ability to manage intersections by toggling traffic lights and stop signs.
Green Cities	19 October 2017
Green Cities	Allows the player to implement principles related to sustainable development to cities, such as solar panel rooftops, electric cars, and other ecological improvements. A free update released alongside this DLC overhauled how noise pollution works on roads, and added new trees and electric cars.
Parklife	24 May 2018
Parklife	Concentrates on building amusement parks, nature reserves, zoos, and city parks. Using the park area tool, the player can create large expanses of customizable parks and can also place various buildings along and close to pathways, not just on roads. New district and area policies, new assets, and sightseeing tours were also added.
Industries	23 October 2018
Industries	Enhances the industries in a player's city. It allows players further customization of the industrial aspects of their city by letting players micro-manage more parts of the industrial zoning. It also utilized resources a lot more allowing for more levels of resource specialization and unique industrial buildings exclusive to the DLC. All of the new buildings are ploppable and are intertwined between each other whilst managing to function collaboratively. A free update released alongside this DLC added things such as toll booths.
Campus	21 May 2019
Campus	Allows players to zone university campuses with the campus area tool. Players can create three different types of campus – trade schools, liberal arts colleges, and universities. Other additions include museums, varsity sports facilities (e.g. baseball, basketball, swimming arenas) and academic works. A free update released alongside this DLC added public libraries and school buses, the latter of which works as a regular city bus.
Sunset Harbor	26 March 2020
Sunset Harbor	Adds a new fishing industry, intercity buses, trolleybuses, transport hubs, helicopters, and several new buildings. A free update released alongside this DLC overhauled the metro system, allowing it to be above-ground.
Airports	25 January 2022
Airports	Introduces the ability to design and build custom airports. It was the first major DLC to be released for the game in nearly two years. A free update released alongside this DLC added new trees by modder MrMaison, as well as the ability to change the trees on roads with them.
Plazas & Promenades	14 September 2022
Plazas & Promenades	Introduces support for building pedestrian zones and adds high-capacity service buildings and schools, as well as wall-to-wall specializations. A free update was released alongside this DLC that added many new roads and one-way metro tracks.
Race Day	10 March 2026
Race Day	Introduces the ability to add dedicated race tracks and street circuits for motor, cycle, and running races, as well as parades.

=== Mini-expansions and cosmetic/flavor packs ===
Name	Release date / description
Match Day	9 June 2016
Match Day	Free DLC released for players that adds a football stadium and allows players to host sporting events.
Pearls From the East	22 March 2017
Pearls From the East	Pearls From the East is a free cosmetic pack that was announced on 10 March 2017. Official description: 'Pearls from the East will bring a splash of style to your city, inspired by Chinese architecture and design! Give your residents some new attractions (and pandas!) to visit with three original buildings, each ready to become a unique part of your skyline.'
Concerts	17 August 2017
Concerts	Mini-expansion. Enables players to place an event venue for concerts and festivals, and enact laws and regulations relating to these. Not released on console editions.
Financial Districts	13 December 2022
Financial Districts	Introduces a new "investment" feature and allows various tweaks to a city's tax system, letting players use their funds to invest in the best industries for their population. It also adds a new district specialization with its own visual style and 104 new assets, including bank buildings.
Hotels & Retreats	23 May 2023
Hotels & Retreats	Adds a variety of new unique hotel buildings, along with a new feature that allows players to manage their hotels.

== Legacy ==
Paradox Interactive announced a sequel to Cities: Skylines in March 2023, titled Cities: Skylines II. The game was released on 24 October 2023 for Windows. The Xbox Series X/S and PlayStation 5 release was scheduled for Q2 of 2024, then postponed until October 2024 and was later indefinitely postponed.

A Lego-themed spin-off of the series, titled Lego Skylines, was announced at Gamescom in August 2026.
