= Colossal Order =

Finnish video game developer

- Type: Private
- Industry: Video games
- Founded: June 2009; 17 years ago
- Headquarters: Tampere, Finland
- Key people: Mariina Hallikainen (CEO)
- Number of employees: 30 (2022)
- Website: colossalorder.fi

Colossal Order is a Finnish video game development studio known for its business simulation game series Cities in Motion and for its city-builder series Cities: Skylines. The company was founded in Tampere, Finland, in 2009. The CEO of Colossal Order is Mariina Hallikainen.

== History ==
Colossal Order was founded in the summer of 2009 by a group of game developers of the mobile game company Universomo. Mariina Hallikainen was hired from outside of Universomo as the CEO of the new company.

At first, Colossal Order had difficulties obtaining funding for its first game, the business simulation game Cities in Motion, which was already in development when the company was founded. Investors thought that Cities in Motion would not attract a large enough clientele. Instead of big investors, the first steps of the company were funded by Finnish public instruments – Centre for Economic Development, Transport and the Environment, Tekes, and DigiDemo finance of the Promotion Centre for Audiovisual Culture – as well as small private investors.

In its early phase, the company was coached by the Yritystalli program of the Tampere University of Technology, but advice was sought directly from experienced Finnish game development companies as well, specifically Remedy Entertainment and Frozenbyte. Upon being founded, Colossal Order compared dozens of publishers and ended up signing a publishing agreement with Paradox Interactive after over a year's worth of negotiations.

Colossal Order was awarded the Finnish Game Developer of the Year (Finnish: Vuoden suomalainen pelinkehittäjä) award at the 2015 DigiExpo convention. The judges said that Colossal Order was an example for companies seeking success in the gaming industry space.

On 17 November 2025, Colossal Order announced that it had mutually decided to part ways with its publisher, Paradox Interactive, therefore ending their partnership in the Cities: Skylines franchise.

== Games ==
The relationship between Colossal Order and its publisher Paradox Interactive has been characterised as constructive. Colossal Order has the freedom to create games without limitations set by the publisher, bar those on schedules.

Unlike the game developers that founded it, Colossal Order does not develop mobile games. Instead, the company focuses on PC games. Employees of the company have their own internal wiki platform for developing games. Games by Colossal Order are known for their active modding communities. One of the programmers at the company works full-time on modding tools.

The best-known game of the company is the city-building game Cities: Skylines, published on 10 March 2015. It competes with games of the SimCity and Cities XL series. A total of 14 expansion packs, 22 content packs and 23 music packs were released for the game.

Cities: Skylines II was announced on 6 March 2023 and released on 24 October 2023 for Windows. Console versions of the game were delayed until Q2 2024, before being further delayed indefinitely.

=== List of games ===
Year	Title	Publisher	Platform(s)
2011	Cities in Motion	Paradox Interactive	Windows, MacOS, Linux
2013	Cities in Motion 2	Paradox Interactive	Windows, MacOS, Linux
2015	Cities: Skylines	Paradox Interactive	Windows, MacOS, Linux, Xbox One, Xbox Series X and Series S, PS4, PS5, Switch, Stadia
2023	Cities: Skylines II	Paradox Interactive	Windows, planned for Xbox Series X and Series S and PS5
