= Paradox Interactive =

Swedish video game publisher

Paradox Interactive AB
- Type: Public
- Traded as: Nasdaq Stockholm: PDX
- ISIN: SE0008294953
- Industry: Video games
- Genre: Grand strategy games, 4X
- Founded: 1999; 27 years ago
- Headquarters: Stockholm, Sweden
- Key people: Fredrik Wester (CEO)
- Products: Video games
- Revenue: ▼2,201 million kr (2024)
- Operating income: ▲721.4 million kr (2024)
- Net income: ▲757.3 million kr (2024)
- Owner: WesterInvest AB (33.4%); Investment Aktiebolaget Spiltan (15.3%); Tencent (10%); State Street Bank and Trust Company (3.9%)
- Number of employees: 663 (Dec 2025)
- Subsidiaries: Paradox Development Studio; Triumph Studios; Playrion Game Studio; Iceflake Studios; White Wolf Publishing; Haemimont Games
- Website: paradoxinteractive.com

Paradox Interactive AB is a video game publisher based in Stockholm, Sweden. The company started out as the video game division of Target Games and then Paradox Entertainment (now Cabinet Entertainment) before being spun out into an independent company in 2004. Through a combination of expanding internal studios, founding new studios and purchasing independent developers, the company has grown to comprise nine first-party development studios, including its flagship Paradox Development Studio, and acts as publisher for games from other developers.

Paradox is best known for releasing strategy video games, especially historically-themed grand strategy games, and has published strategy games in different settings, as well as games of other genres such as role-playing video games and management simulators. They typically continue development of its games after initial release with the creation of downloadable content, and are also known for creating games that are easy to mod.

Outside of video games, Paradox has created board games based on several of its titles, and owns the rights to the tabletop role-playing game series World of Darkness since purchasing White Wolf Publishing in 2015. They hold an annual convention, PDXCON, which has been open to the public since 2017.

== History ==
=== Separation from Paradox Entertainment (1999–2004) ===
Paradox Interactive's origins started with Target Games, a Sweden-based board game company. Target had been producing board and tabletop role-playing games in the 1980s and 1990s, and ventured into video games. By the late 1990s, Target was struggling financially, and it ultimately folded into bankruptcy by 1999. The video game division spun off into a separate entity, Paradox Entertainment, which published video game adaptions of Target's games. The new division selected an image based on the skeleton of a platypus, which originally given the scientific name ornithorhynchus paradoxus; the division considered its design philosophy to be "weird and unique" like the platypus. Between 2000 and 2004, Paradox Entertainment released the first titles of several grand strategy games, including Europa Universalis, Hearts of Iron, Victoria: An Empire Under the Sun, and Crusader Kings. The company had several mediocre releases, as well as a failed, ambitious attempt at releasing a free-to-play massively multiplayer online game first-person shooter title on a triple-A scale, leading to more than 30 developers losing their jobs when the project was later cancelled before its completion.

By around 2003, Paradox Entertainment began buying the intellectual property rights to various franchises like Conan the Barbarian from Robert E. Howard and Solomon Kane. Fredrik Wester, current CEO of Paradox Interactive, stated that around 2003 he had been brought aboard by Paradox Entertainment to help write their business plan, which included the drive to transform their video game division into a triple-A studio. Wester cautioned them about this, pointing back to the studio's previous unsuccessful project. The Paradox Entertainment executives did not take this advice well and decided it would be better to shutter the video games division and focus exclusively on licensing their acquired brands. Instead, Wester, along with the Paradox Entertainment CEO Theodore Bergquist, bought out the video games division retaining the Swedish Paradox Development Studio and all seven of its developers including Johan Andersson and Henrik Fåhraeus. They gained all intellectual property rights to the studio's past games, forming Paradox Interactive in 2004.

=== Growth as a publisher (2005–2015) ===
One of the first titles that was planned by Paradox Interactive was Crusader Kings, another grand strategy title. Their publisher, Strategy First, filed for bankruptcy about two months into its release, costing Paradox revenues from those sales as well as the lack of a North American distributor. After the launch of the digital storefront Steam around 2003, Wester experimented with digital marketplaces by offering downloadable content for Victoria via their website. The experiment proved successful, and subsequently in 2006 the company launched Paradox On Demand, a digital storefront with several of Paradox's back-catalog for sale. This eventually was renamed as GamersGate later in 2006. To help support it, Paradox looked to sign on games from developers as to bolster the company's reputation as a world-class video game publisher. Wester stated in 2013 that many of these games were "terribly bad", but that some proved to be strong performers, such as Mount & Blade. GamersGate eventually was spun off to be its own entity in 2008, while Paradox continued to acquire additional titles to fill its distributor catalogue which helped to finance continued development of grand strategy titles from the Paradox Development Studio. By 2013, the company had reached 100 employees, and established new offices in Stockholm, Sweden.

Paradox Interactive continued to publish numerous games from smaller developers over the next several years, finding success in games like Magicka from Arrowhead Game Studios (the publisher's first title to break 1 million copies sold) and War of the Roses from Fatshark. Wester and others in Paradox admitted in 2013 that this approach had been ambitious and led to issues with quality control in the resulting games, leading to a general impression about Paradox games being buggy. The publisher had greenlit and invested in several titles by its internal studios without careful review that failed to pan out, such as East vs. West, a spin-off from the Hearts of Iron series, By 2014, the company had made a decision to become much more selective of which titles to publish, making sure they were able to provide the necessary quality control support each title needed before agreeing to publish. Crusader Kings II in 2012 was one of the first games developed and published by Paradox with more attention focused on development timelines and testing to avoid past mistakes, and Paradox has since followed a similar model on its future titles.

On 17 December 2009, PI acquired AGEod which in turn became known as Paradox France as the company's French footprint. In 2012, then AGEod as Paradox France was split away again from Paradox Development Studio for working exclusively on games utilizing AGEod's own AGE-engine, with full autonomy. Development of AGEod's own successor Napoleon's Campaigns II to its own previous Napoleon's Campaigns (2007) was shifted from being partially helped developed by Paradox Development Studio to being solely developed by them, utilizing eventually the own in-house Clausewitz engine — The game later became known as Paradox' published own March of the Eagles.

One of Paradox Interactive's more notable publishing deals was its agreement with Colossal Order in 2011 to publish its Cities in Motion transportation simulation game and later its sequel Cities in Motion 2. Colossal Order ultimately wanted to produce a city simulation game to challenge Electronic Arts SimCity series but Paradox had expressed concerns regarding the competition. However, after the release of the 2013 SimCity game and the poor reception it received due to a variety of gameplay changes and difficulties with online services required to play the game, Paradox greenlit Colossal Order for its city simulation game, Cities: Skylines, which was released in 2015 and has sold over 12 million copies by June 2022. Another collaboration for Paradox was with Obsidian Entertainment. Obsidian, having struggled financially, crowd-sourced the development of a new game, Pillars of Eternity, and entered into a publishing deal for it through Paradox. Obsidian published its next title, Tyranny through Paradox.

Paradox opened its second internal development studio, Paradox Arctic, located in Umeå, Sweden, formed from former members of EA DICE and Starbreeze Studios, in 2014.

=== Going public (2016) ===
In March 2016, CEO Fredrik Wester stated in an interview with Di Digital that Paradox Interactive had launched the IPO process. The company stated its intention to complete this process within a year, with the goal of spreading ownership between employees and players of its games and "looking for long-term owners who want to take part in the Paradox journey".

On 31 May 2016, trading in Paradox Interactive commenced on Nasdaq First North under the ticker PDX. The initial price offering was 33 per share kr (US$3.96) valuing the company at 3.485 billion kr (US$420 million). Paradox set aside about 5% of the shares to allocate to Tencent, valued at about 174.24 million kr (US$21 million). Wester continued to hold 33.3% of the shares of the company, while investment firm Spiltan held to 30.5% of the shares. Finances created by the offering allowed Paradox to begin several acquisitions of various studios and intellectual properties.

=== Continued development (2017–present) ===
Paradox announced the opening of its third internal studio, Paradox Thalassic located in Malmö, Sweden, in May 2017. The studio was established to develop mobile games based on Paradox's properties. Paradox Interactive's financial performance for 2017 saw a 24% year-on-year increase in revenues to 813.8 million kr, and a 10% year-on-year increase in profits to 339.8 million kr.

Wester stepped down as CEO in August 2018, but he remained executive chairman of the board while board member Ebba Ljungerud took his place as CEO. The move was billed as giving Wester more ability to look for growth opportunities while Ljungerud handled the day-to-day operations of the company, which had since grown to about 300 employees since its foundation.

In March 2019, Paradox announced the opening of Paradox Tectonic, located in Berkeley, California, with Rod Humble serving as studio lead. Another new studio, Paradox Tinto, was opened in June 2020 in Barcelona, Spain, led by Johan Andersson to oversee Europa Universalis IV development and other Paradox grand strategy titles.

In June 2020, Paradox became one of the first major publishers to announce support for unionization efforts when it concluded a labour agreement with its employees in its Swedish divisions and the Swedish unions Swedish Confederation of Professional Associations and Unionen. Paradox acquired Playrion, the developer of Airlines Manager, in July 2020. In 2021, Paradox committed to overhauling its online forums, due to challenges in engaging its community.

On 1 September 2021, Ljungerud resigned as CEO "due to differing views on the company's strategy going forward," with the then executive chairman of the board and former CEO Fredrik Wester taking her place and resigning from his position on the board. Following this, Håkan Sjunnesson, at the time deputy chairman of the board, became chairman. At the end of September 2021, the company announced it was cancelling development on several unannounced products to focus on "proven game niches", leaving 15 projects in development. According to Wester, the company's focus remains on their strategy and simulation games, and that they have "sharpened our pipeline further to ensure that the projects with the highest potential have the resources necessary for the best possible development".

That same September, Swedish publication Breakit reported that an internal survey from Paradox employees found 44% of the 133 responds had reported some type of "mistreatment" in the company, and that many respondents believed there was a "culture of silence" at the firm. The following month, a report from Svenska Dagbladet further investigated this situation, finding that the female employees believed the company was "clearly male-dominated", and with several men in senior management positions in roles involved in harassment and mistreatment of employees. Eurogamer also spoke to Paradox employees, confirming these findings. Paradox replied to these reports that while the prior survey was too small a fraction of its total employee count to take action on, it has hired an independent auditor to review its company culture, starting with its Sweden operations. In February 2022, it published the audit on its webpage.

The company launched Paradox Arc in August 2022 as a new publishing label aimed for games from smaller studios.

Colossal Order had released Cities: Skylines II in 2023, published by Paradox. The sequel had several problems at launch, which had pushed back planned DLC releases for the game. By November 2025, Paradox and Colossal Order had announced they planned to pursue independent paths, with Cities: Skylines II development to be taken over by Paradox's Iceflake Studios.

Paradox transitioned to the Nasdaq Stockholm Main Market on 9 June 2026.

== Studios ==
Paradox operates five internal studios:

Parent group	Name	Location	Founded or acquired	Ref(s).
Paradox Interactive	Paradox Development Studio	Stockholm, Sweden	Founded: 1995	
Paradox Interactive	Paradox Tinto	Sitges, Spain	Founded: 2020	
Triumph Studios		Delft, Netherlands	Acquired: 2017	
Playrion Game Studio		Paris, France	Acquired: 2020	
Iceflake Studios		Tampere, Finland	Acquired: 2020	
Haemimont Games		Sofia, Bulgaria	Acquired: 2025	

=== Former ===
Name	Location	Founded or acquired	Closed or Divested	Ref(s).
Paradox Arctic	Umeå, Sweden	Founded: 2014	Closed: 2023	
Paradox Thalassic	Malmö, Sweden	Founded: 2017	Closed: 2023	
Harebrained Schemes	Seattle, Washington	Acquired: 2018	Divested: 2024	
Paradox Tectonic	Berkeley, California	Founded: 2019	Closed: 2024	

=== Video games ===
Paradox is the publisher of its internally developed single and multiplayer grand strategy games series; Imperator: Rome, Crusader Kings III, Europa Universalis V, Victoria 3, Hearts of Iron IV, and Stellaris. Each of these franchises accounts for different periods of time in human history - the founding of the Roman Empire, the Middle Ages, the early modern period, the Victorian era, World War II, and a science fiction-oriented "future" space age, respectively.

Paradox has also published games for 1C Company, AGEod, Arrowhead Game Studios, BattleGoat Studios, NeocoreGames, TaleWorlds Entertainment, and Frictional Games.

=== Board games ===
At the 2018 PDXCon, Paradox announced it was working with board game designers and publishers to produce a number of board games based on its video game properties, including Europa Universalis, Crusader Kings, Hearts of Iron, and Cities: Skylines.

A board game version of Hearts of Iron created by Steamforged Games was announced on December 13th, 2024.

=== Events ===
==== PDXCON ====
Prior to 2016, Paradox Interactive had invited members of the gaming industry press to Stockholm to preview upcoming titles at an annual press day. Starting in 2017, Paradox transformed this to a weekend event opened to the public called PDXCon. PDXCon 2017 was held in May at the Gamla Riksarkivet in Stockholm, and included four hundred gamers alongside the press at the event. For the 2018 PDXCon in May, Paradox expanded the public attendance to 800 gamers. The 2019 PDXCon was held in Berlin in October 18–20, 2019, giving it access to a larger space and more ready access for gamers to attend. On April 21, 2022, Paradox announced via Twitter that PDXCON would be returning in September.

==== Paradox Insider ====
Due to the COVID-19 pandemic Paradox chose to replace PDXCON with virtual events called Paradox Insider.

The first occurred on June 13, 2020, and would air in partnership with Guerrilla Collective after their showcase.

On February 11, 2021, Paradox announced that Insider would return again on March 13, 2021, and would be part of the Game Dev Direct showcase.

== Game characteristics ==
=== Grand strategy ===
Paradox Interactive has generally focused on publishing grand strategy games made by its subsidiary, Paradox Development Studio. Grand strategy games are often played on a real-world map, marked by the use of standard real-time elements but with an ability to make any and all changes even while paused. The focus of each game is different, but generally a player must manage the economy, commerce, internal politics, diplomacy, technological development, and military forces of a nation. The games are usually nonlinear with no set victory condition.

Examples of these grand strategy games in the Paradox catalogue include Imperator: Rome, the Crusader Kings series, the Europa Universalis series, the Victoria series, the Hearts of Iron series, and Stellaris.

=== Other genres ===
Along with grand strategy games, Paradox's catalogue has come to include simulation and management games, such as the Cities in Motion series and Cities: Skylines, and role-playing video games such as Pillars of Eternity. The publisher has ventured into other genres in the period between 2011 and 2014, but have since shifted focus back to these three core areas; according to Shams Jorjani, the vice president of business development, "We had this vision of people buying a Paradox game without knowing what the game was; that 'Paradox' should be a guarantee for a type of game experience". The period from 2011 to 2014 was marked by the publication of the first Magicka game in 2011, itself having been greenlit for publishing after seeing the success of the Mount & Blade series in 2008, which did not quite fit their grand strategy profile. Magicka had been successful, so between 2013 and 2014, the publisher greenlit a number of different titles from across a number of genres, which, on retrospective, the publisher found that they could not properly manage or promote well, leading them to limit themselves to three core genres.

=== Post-content model ===
Paradox supports games following its release with a long tail of updates to its games often several years after release. Some of these are free updates or downloadable content (DLC), and many add large game changing elements to the game and the way it is played. Paradox board member Ebba Ljungerud justified this part of its business model by stating "We want to make really great games for our fans, and we can't do that if we don't charge something for the development". Players have complained of Paradox' tendency to have a large number of paid DLC for its games, some of which become required to be able to play with others. This can raise the effective cost of the game: for example, Crusader Kings II, which released in 2012, had 24 DLC packs by 2018, bringing the apparent price of the game from US$60 to US$300. Ljungerud has stated that it knows this approach to DLC is unconventional and inundating for newcomers and can be improved. However, Wester asserted its current approach is a "fair and balanced" method, as alongside the paid DLC, it also releases free updates that add new gameplay features and quality-of-life improvements to the title, so that all owners of the game can benefit from this approach regardless if they purchase the DLC.

Paradox trialed a subscription model approach to the extended content for these games, first as a limited beta in 2020 with Europa Universalis IV, before releasing a full subscription program in February 2021 for Crusader Kings II. A subscription gives access to all DLC for the subscribed title for a $5 monthly subscription fee. A Paradox spokesman said this was "an affordable way for players to experience the entire Crusader Kings II catalogue without having to weigh which items they would prefer to purchase". A full subscription program for Europa Universalis IV was issued in March 2021, for Hearts of Iron IV on 15 February 2022 and for Stellaris on 27 February 2024.

=== Modding ===
Paradox tries to make games that are open and easy to edit (moddable), from tweaking a saved game to creating a new scenario. Modding can be accomplished with simple tools and basic knowledge of scripting. To assist modders to figure out how to edit the game on their own, the Paradox forums provide fan-compiled libraries of "how to" advice. Paradox worked with Microsoft to develop Paradox Mods, an open modding platform that allows the same user-created mods to work both on Microsoft Windows and Xbox One system, with initial testing being done through Surviving Mars starting in February 2019.

== Acquisitions ==
=== White Wolf ===
Paradox Interactive purchased White Wolf Publishing's assets, including World of Darkness and Vampire: The Masquerade, from CCP Games in October 2015. White Wolf became a self-operating subsidiary of Paradox Interactive with its own management and goals.

In January 2017, White Wolf announced its partnership with video game publisher Focus Home Interactive for the video game adaptation of Werewolf: The Apocalypse, a tabletop role-playing game set in the World of Darkness. It was developed by the game development studio Cyanide and released on PC and consoles on February 4, 2021, as Werewolf: The Apocalypse - Earthblood.

In November 2018, as a result of backlash generated by material pertaining to "murder of gay Chechens" published in a Vampire: The Masquerade Fifth Edition source book, it was announced that White Wolf would no longer function as an entity separate from its parent company, and would cease developing and publishing products internally.

In May 2025, Jason Carl, Brand Marketing Manager at White Wolf, announced the company's return as the official licensing and publishing entity for all World of Darkness transmedia properties.

=== Studio acquisitions ===
Paradox Interactive acquired the Dutch game development studio Triumph Studios, the creator of the Age of Wonders and Overlord series, in June 2017. The acquisition was considered to be a good fit by both commentators and the involved companies, based on similarities in product genres and corporate culture.

In January 2018, Paradox acquired a 33% minority stake in developer Hardsuit Labs, the developers of Blacklight: Retribution, at a cost of US$2 million. In May 2023, Paradox would divest the remaining 33% to Keywords Studios for $4 million USD.

Paradox Interactive acquired Harebrained Schemes, the maker of Shadowrun Returns and the Paradox-published game BattleTech, in June 2018 for a fixed price of US$7,500,000 and 25% of the earnings of Harebrained Schemes excluding publishing cost in the next 5 years, to the extent they exceed the fixed purchasing price.

Paradox acquired Paris-based Playrion Game Studio, specializing in mobile game development, in July 2020, making it its eighth internal studio. Paradox stated the acquisition will help it expand into the mobile games marketplace. Also in July 2020, Paradox acquired Iceflake Studios out of Tampere, Finland, which had previously been developing Surviving the Aftermath with Paradox as the publisher.

On February 6, 2025, Paradox announced its acquisition of Bulgarian studio Haemimont Games who had previously developed Surviving Mars, which is published by Paradox, and games in the Tropico and Jagged Alliance series. Paradox stated the acquisition would assist its growth in the management game genre.

	Date	Company	Business	Country	Value (USD)	Adjusted (USD)	Derived Studios		References
1	June 2017	Triumph Studios	Video game developer	NED	$4.5 million	—	—	—	
2	January 2018	Hardsuit Labs	Video game developer	USA	$2 million (33%)	—	—	—	—
3	June 2018	Harebrained Schemes	Video game developer	USA	$7.5 million	—	—	—	—
4	July 2020	Playrion Game Studio	Mobile video game developer	FRA	undisclosed	—	—	—	—
5	July 2020	Iceflake Studios	Video game developer	FIN	undisclosed	—	—	—	—
6	February 2025	Haemimont Games	Video game developer	BUL	$11.1 million	—	—	—	—

=== Intellectual property acquisitions ===
In January 2019, Paradox acquired the intellectual property rights to the Prison Architect series from developer Introversion Software, with plans to continue to expand more games in the same theme. Introversion had stated it had taken the series as far as it could and believed that Paradox's purchase would ultimately help the series in the future.

In March 2022, Paradox acquired Academia: School Simulator from Squeaky Wheel Studio.

In April 2025, the game's rights to Stranded: Alien Dawn were sold to Paradox Interactive for £3.6 million from Haemimont Games.
