= Index of DOS games (H) =

This is an index of DOS games.

This list has been split into multiple pages. Please use the Table of Contents to browse it.

Title	Released	Developer(s)	Publisher(s)
Hack	1984	Don Kneller	
Hacker	1985	Activision	Activision
Hacker II: The Doomsday Papers	1986	Activision	Activision
Halls of Montezuma: A Battle History of the U.S. Marine Corps	1990	Strategic Studies Group	Strategic Studies Group
Halls of the Dead: Faery Tale Adventure II	1997	The Dreamers Guild	Encore, Inc.
Hammer of the Gods	1994	Holistic Design	New World Computing
Hamurabi	1996		
HardBall!	1987	Accolade	Accolade
HardBall II	1989	Distinctive Software	Accolade
HardBall III	1992	MindSpan	Accolade
Hardball 4	1994	MindSpan	Accolade
Hardball 5	1995	MindSpan	Accolade
Hard Drivin'	1990	Domark	Domark
Hard Hat Mack	1984	Michael Abbot, Matthew Alexander	Electronic Arts
Hardline	1997	Cryo Interactive	Virgin Interactive
Hard Nova	1990	Malibu Interactive	Electronic Arts
Hare Raising Havoc	1991	BlueSky Software	Disney Software
Harley Davidson: The Road to Sturgis	1989	Incredible Technologies	Mindscape
Harpoon	1989	Applied Computing Services, Three-Sixty Pacific	Three-Sixty Pacific
Harpoon 2	1994	Three-Sixty Pacific	Three-Sixty Pacific
Harpoon II: Admiral's Edition	1996	Three-Sixty Pacific	Eidos Interactive
Harrier Combat Simulator	1987	Mindscape	Mindscape
Harrier Jump Jet	1992	MicroProse	MicroProse
Harvester	1996	DigiFX Interactive	Merit Studios
Hat Trick	1987	Bally Senate	Capcom
Headline Harry and the Great Paper Race	1991	Davidson & Associates	Davidson & Associates
Heartlight	1994	xLand Games	Epic MegaGames
Heart of China	1991	Sierra On-line	Dynamix
Heaven & Earth	1992	Buena Vista Games	Buena Vista Games
Heavy Barrel	1989	Quicksilver Software	Data East
Heimdall	1992	The 8th Day	Core Design
Heimdall 2: Into the Hall of Worlds	1994	The 8th Day	Core Design
Hell: A Cyberpunk Thriller	1994	Take-Two Interactive	GameTek
Heretic	1994	Raven Software	id Software
Heroes of Might and Magic: A Strategic Quest	1995	New World Computing	New World Computing
Heroes of Might and Magic II	1996	New World Computing	3DO Company
Heroes of the 357th	1992	Midnight Software	Electronic Arts
Heros: The Sanguine Seven	1993	Jeffrey Fullerton	Safari Software
Hexen: Beyond Heretic	1995	Raven Software	id Software
Hexxagon	1993	Argo Games	Software Creations
Hexx: Heresy of the Wizard	1994	Psygnosis	Psygnosis
Hiarcs Master 1.0	1991	Mark Uniacke	Applied Computer Concepts
Hidden Agenda	1988	TRANS Fiction Systems	Springboard Software
High Seas Trader	1994	Impressions Games	Impressions Games
Highway Hunter	1994	Omega Integral Systems	Safari Software
Highway Patrol 2	1990	MC2-Microïds	Titus France SA
Hillsfar	1989	Westwood Studios	Strategic Simulations
Hill Street Blues	1991	Krisalis Software	DigiTek Software
Hind	1996	Digital Integration Ltd.	Digital Integration Ltd., Interactive Magic
Hi-Octane	1995	Bullfrog Productions	Electronic Arts
Hired Guns	1993	DMA Design	Psygnosis
History Line: 1914-1918	1992	Blue Byte	Blue Byte, Strategic Simulations
Hitchhiker's Guide to the Galaxy, The	1984	Douglas Adams, Steve Meretzky	Infocom
Hobbit, The	1983	Beam Software	Melbourne House
Hocus Pocus	1994	Moonlite Software	Apogee Software
Hollywood Hijinx	1986	Infocom	Infocom
Home Alone	1991	Manley & Associates	Capstone Software
Home Alone 2: Lost in New York	1992	Manley & Associates	Capstone Software
Home Alone Computerized Coloring Book, The	1992	Capstone Software	IntraCorp
Hometown U.S.A.	1988	Manley & Associates	Publishing International
Homey D. Clown	1993	Synergistic Software	Capstone Software
Hook	1992	Shadow Software	Ocean Software
Hoosier City	1992	MVP Software	MVP Software
Horde, The	1994	Toys for Bob	Crystal Dynamics
Horror Zombies from the Crypt	1990	Astral Software	Millennium Interactive, U.S. Gold
Hostage: Rescue Mission	1988	Infogrames	Infogrames, Superior Software
Hound of Shadow, The	1989	Eldritch Games	Electronic Arts
Hovertank 3D	1991	id Software	Softdisk
Hoyle's Official Book of Games: Volume 1	1989	Sierra On-Line	Sierra On-Line
Hoyle's Official Book of Games: Volume 2	1990	Sierra On-Line	Sierra On-Line
Hoyle's Official Book of Games: Volume 3	1991	Sierra On-Line	Sierra On-Line
Hugo's House of Horrors	1990	Gray Design Associates	Gray Design Associates
Hugo II, Whodunit?	1991	Gray Design Associates	Gray Design Associates
Hugo III, Jungle of Doom!	1992	Gray Design Associates	Gray Design Associates
The Humans	1992	Imagitec Design	GameTek
Humbug	1990	Graham Cluley	
Hunt for Red October, The	1988	Oxford Digital Enterprises	Datasoft, Grandslam Entertainment, Software Toolworks
Hunt for Red October, The	1990	Images Software	Grandslam Entertainment
H.U.R.L.	1995	Millennium Media Group	Deep River Publishing
Hyper 3-D Pinball	1995	NMS Software Ltd.	Virgin Interactive
Hyper Dyne Side Arms	1987	Capcom	Capcom
Hyperspeed	1991	MicroProse	MicroProse
