= List of PC games (H) =

The following page is an alphabetical section from the list of PC games.

== H ==
Name	Developer	Publisher	Genre(s)	Operating system(s)	Date released
Hades	Supergiant Games	Supergiant Games	Roguelike, action role-playing, hack and slash	Microsoft Windows, macOS	17 September 2020
Hades II	Supergiant Games	Supergiant Games	Roguelike, action role-playing, hack and slash	Microsoft Windows, macOS	25 September 2025
Half-Life	Valve, Gearbox Software	Sierra Entertainment	First-person shooter	Microsoft Windows, Linux, macOS	19 November 1998
Half-Life 2	Valve	Valve, Sierra Entertainment	First-person shooter	Microsoft Windows, Linux, macOS	16 November 2004
Half-Life: Blue Shift	Valve, Gearbox Software	Sierra Studios	First-person shooter	Microsoft Windows, Linux, macOS	12 June 2001
Half-Life Deathmatch: Source	Valve	Valve	First-person shooter	Microsoft Windows, Linux, macOS	1 May 2006
Half-Life: Opposing Force	Valve, Gearbox Software	Sierra Studios	First-person shooter	Microsoft Windows, Linux, macOS	10 November 1999
Half-Life: Source	Valve	Valve	First-person shooter	Microsoft Windows, Linux, macOS	1 June 2004
Half-Life 2: Deathmatch	Valve	Valve	First-person shooter	Microsoft Windows, Linux, macOS	30 November 2004
Half-Life 2: Episode One	Valve	Valve	First-person shooter	Microsoft Windows, Linux, macOS	1 June 2006
Half-Life 2: Episode Two	Valve	Valve	First-person shooter	Microsoft Windows, Linux, macOS	10 October 2007
Half-Life 2: Lost Coast	Valve	Valve	First-person shooter	Microsoft Windows, Linux, macOS	27 October 2005
Half-Life: Alyx	Valve	Valve	First-person shooter, VR game	Microsoft Windows, Linux	23 March 2020
Halo: Combat Evolved	Bungie, Gearbox Software, Westlake Interactive	Microsoft Game Studios, MacSoft	First-person shooter	Microsoft Windows, macOS	30 September 2003
Halo: Combat Evolved Anniversary	343 Industries; Saber Interactive	Microsoft Studios	First-person shooter	Microsoft Windows	3 March 2020
Halo 2	Bungie, Microsoft Game Studios, Pi Studios	Microsoft Game Studios	First-person shooter	Microsoft Windows	17 May 2007
Halo Infinite	343 Industries	Xbox Game Studios	First-person shooter	Microsoft Windows	8 December 2021
Halo: The Master Chief Collection	343 Industries	Xbox Game Studios	First-person shooter	Microsoft Windows	3 December 2019
Halo Recruit	343 Industries; Endeavor One	Microsoft Studios	First-person shooter	Microsoft Windows	17 October 2017
Halo: Spartan Assault	343 Industries; Vanguard Games	Microsoft Studios	Twin-stick shooter	Microsoft Studios	18 July 2013
Halo: Spartan Strike	343 Industries; Vanguard Games	Microsoft Studios	Twin-stick shooter	Microsoft Studios	16 April 2015
Halo Wars 2	343 Industries; Creative Assembly	Microsoft Studios	Real-time strategy	Microsoft Windows	21 February 2017
Hard Truck Apocalypse	Targem Games	Buka Entertainment	Vehicular combat	Microsoft Windows	19 June 2006
Harvester	DigiFX Interactive	Merit Studios, Virgin Interactive, Night Dive Studios	Adventure	DOS, Microsoft Windows, Linux	25 September 1996
A Hat in Time	Gears for Breakfast	Humble Bundle	Adventure, platforming	Microsoft Windows, macOS	2017
Hatoful Boyfriend: A School of Hope and White Wings	PigeoNaton, Mediatonic	MIST[PSI]PRESS, Devolver Digital	Visual novel, dating simulation, otome game, nakige	Microsoft Windows, Linux, macOS	24 August 2014
Headlander	Double Fine Productions	Adult Swim Games	Metroidvania	Microsoft Windows, macOS	26 July 2016
Hearthstone	Blizzard Entertainment	Blizzard Entertainment	Digital collectible card game	Microsoft Windows, macOS	March 11, 2014
Hearts of Iron	Paradox Development Studios	Strategy First	Grand strategy	Microsoft Windows, macOS	24 November 2002
Hearts of Iron II	Paradox Development Studios	Paradox Interactive	Grand strategy	Microsoft Windows, macOS	4 January 2005
Hearts of Iron III	Paradox Development Studios	Paradox Interactive	Grand strategy	Microsoft Windows, macOS	7 August 2009
Hearts of Iron IV	Paradox Development Studios	Paradox Interactive	Grand strategy	Microsoft Windows, macOS	6 June 2016
Heavy Rain	Quantic Dream	Quantic Dream	Interactive drama, action-adventure	Microsoft Windows	24 June 2019
Hello Neighbor	Dynamic Pixels	tinyBuild	Stealth, survival horror	Microsoft Windows, macOS	8 December 2017
Helldivers	Arrowhead Game Studios	Sony Computer Entertainment	Shoot 'em up	Microsoft Windows	7 December 2015
Helldivers 2	Arrowhead Game Studios	Sony Interactive Entertainment	Third-person shooter	Microsoft Windows	8 February 2024
Helltaker	Łukasz Piskorz	Łukasz Piskorz	Adventure, puzzle, dating sim	Microsoft Windows, macOS, Linux	11 May 2020
Hell Is Us	Rogue Factor	Nancon	Action-adventure	Microsoft Windows	4 September 2025
Heroes of the Lance	U.S. Gold	Strategic Simulations, Inc.	RPG, fantasy	MS-DOS, Amiga, Amstrad CPC, Atari ST, Commodore 64, FM Towns, ZX Spectrum	1 November 1988
Heroes of Might and Magic: A Strategic Quest	New World Computing	New World Computing	Turn-based strategy	Microsoft Windows, DOS, Mac OS	31 August 1995
Heroes of Might and Magic II	New World Computing	The 3DO Company	Turn-based strategy	Microsoft Windows, DOS, Mac OS, RISC OS	1 October 1996
Heroes of Might and Magic III	New World Computing	The 3DO Company	Turn-based strategy	Microsoft Windows, Linux, Mac OS	28 February 1999
Heroes of Newerth	S2 Games	S2 Games	MOBA	Microsoft Windows, Linux, macOS	12 May 2010
Heroes of the Storm	Blizzard Entertainment	Blizzard Entertainment	MOBA	Microsoft Windows, macOS	2 June 2015
Hitman: Absolution	IO Interactive, Feral Interactive	Eidos Interactive, Feral Interactive	Action-adventure, stealth	Microsoft Windows, macOS	19 November 2012
Hitman: Blood Money	IO Interactive	Eidos Interactive	Action-adventure, stealth	Microsoft Windows	30 May 2006
Hitman: Codename 47	IO Interactive	Eidos Interactive	Action-adventure, stealth	Microsoft Windows	19 November 2000
Hitman: Contracts	IO Interactive	Eidos Interactive	Action-adventure, stealth	Microsoft Windows	20 April 2004
Hitman 2: Silent Assassin	IO Interactive	Eidos Interactive	Action-adventure, stealth	Microsoft Windows	1 October 2002
Hitman	IO Interactive, Feral Interactive	Square Enix	Action-adventure, stealth	Microsoft Windows, macOS	11 March 2016
Hitman 2	IO Interactive, Feral Interactive	Warner Bros. Interactive Entertainment	Action-adventure, stealth	Microsoft Windows, macOS	9 November 2018
Hitman III	IO Interactive, Feral Interactive	[Unknown]	Action-adventure, stealth	Microsoft Windows, macOS	January 2021
Hiveswap	What Pumpkin Games	What Pumpkin Games	Adventure	Microsoft Windows, macOS, Linux	14 September 2017
Hogs of War	Infogrames Studios	Infogrames Europe	Turn-based tactics, artillery	Microsoft Windows	3 November 2000
Hogwarts Legacy	Avalanche Software	Warner Bros. Games	Action role-playing	Microsoft Windows	10 February 2023
Hollow Knight	Team Cherry	Team Cherry	Action adventure, Metroidvania	Microsoft Windows, macOS, Linux	24 February 2017
Hollow Knight: Silksong	Team Cherry	Team Cherry	Action adventure, Metroidvania	Microsoft Windows, macOS, Linux	4 September 2025
Homeworld	Relic Entertainment	Sierra Entertainment	Real-time strategy, real-time tactics, space simulation	Microsoft Windows	28 September 1999
Homeworld: Cataclysm	Barking Dog Studios	Sierra Entertainment	Real-time strategy	Microsoft Windows	30 June 2000
Homeworld 2	Relic Entertainment	Sierra Entertainment	Real-time strategy	Microsoft Windows, macOS	16 September 2003
Homeworld: Deserts of Kharak	Blackbird Interactive	Gearbox Software	Real-time strategy	Microsoft Windows, macOS	20 January 2016
Hot Lava	Klei Entertainment	Klei Entertainment	platforming	Microsoft Windows, macOS	19 September 2019
Hotline Miami	Dennaton Games	Devolver Digital	Action, top-down shooter	Microsoft Windows, Linux, macOS	23 October 2012
Hotline Miami 2: Wrong Number	Dennaton Games	Devolver Digital	Action, top-down shooter	Microsoft Windows, Linux, macOS	10 March 2015
House Flipper	Empyrean	Frozen District, PlayWay	Simulation	Microsoft Windows, macOS	17 May 2018
House Flipper 2	Frozen District, Empyrean	Frozen District, PlayWay	Simulation	Microsoft Windows	14 December 2023
Hugo's House of Horrors	Gray Design Associates	Gray Design Associates	Adventure, survival horror	Microsoft Windows, DOS	1990
Hydroneer	Foulball Hangover	Foulball Hangover	Sandbox, Construction and management simulation	Microsoft Windows	8 May 2020
