= Kaiserreich (video game mod) =

Hearts of Iron IV mod

Kaiserreich: Legacy of the Weltkrieg
- Steam Workshop icon
- Developer: The Kaiserreich Team
- Platforms: Linux, macOS, Windows
- Release: 1 December 2016
- Genres: Grand strategy wargame, alternate history

Kaiserreich: Legacy of the Weltkrieg is an alternate history total conversion mod for the grand strategy video game Hearts of Iron IV (2016). Set in an alternate timeline where the Central Powers won World War I, the world of Kaiserreich differs drastically from the politics and borders present during the real World War II, with several nations impacted by civil wars and revolutions.

Similarly to the base Hearts of Iron IV game, the player takes control of a nation during World War II and guides it through the conflict starting in 1936, with no major gameplay differences between the mod and the base game beyond the addition of content. The mod has been met with a positive response from critics, viewing its setting as surpassing that of the base game and allowing for more possibilities. Kaiser Cat Cinema, a group of artists, writers, actors and musicians that creates crowd-funded alternate history content has created several short films and merchandise based on the mod, with the former depicting events showcased in the mod's lore.

== Gameplay ==
Kaiserreich is an alternate history mod for the video game Hearts of Iron IV (2016), a grand strategy game where the player takes control of a chosen nation during World War II, and manages all aspects of it throughout the war, with the goal of being on the winning side of the conflict. These aspects include the nation's politics, industry, and diplomatic relations. Players can also pursue alternate history paths, known as "National Focuses." While Kaiserreich makes no major changes to the core gameplay, it changes the game's main setting, and adds new content to accommodate for it.

== Setting ==
Kaiserreich's map of Europe in 1936

Kaiserreich is set in an alternate timeline where the Central Powers won World War I by 1919, with the mod's start date being 1936. The Central Powers victory leads to numerous changes from the real world's political landscape, with every country and region being impacted and having altered history. The mod gradually leads to the onset of a fictional version of World War II known as the Second Weltkrieg, altered by the mod's lore as well as player action. The game's story and outcomes typically change between playthroughs, often having minor to major differences.

In the mod, the German Empire serves as the leading power of Europe, operating a number of client states in the eastern part of the continent, a large African colony named "Mittelafrika", and numerous colonies in Southeast Asia, all of which are united under a single alliance known as the "Reichspakt". Meanwhile, the other major Central Power, Austria-Hungary, manages to survive outside of Germany's sphere of influence and undergoes a consolidation into one government. After their defeat in the First World War, revolutions overthrow the governments of Great Britain, France, and northern Italy, which adopt various forms of syndicalism as their ideology, forming an alliance known as the Third Internationale, an alliance for socialist nations. Their former governments are exiled, but continue to maintain the Entente, and aim to retake their homelands and colonies. The Russian Revolution ends with the White Army crushing the Bolsheviks and Russia restored as a liberal democratic republic before becoming a far-right ultranationalist dictatorship. Additionally, several nations experience internal unrest after the war, with the United States, Spain, and Argentina all eventually falling into civil wars, and independence movements beginning in several colonies and client states.

In addition to the alterations of borders and diplomacy, Kaiserreich features alterations from the real world's political ideologies, featuring custom ideologies that combine many ideals from several nations into one, and not having the traditional concept of ideologies like communism and fascism. An example of these new ideologies is "Totalism", an ideology structured similarly to Stalinism that attracts figures that would have been otherwise considered fascist, as well as the aforementioned replacement of traditional communism with syndicalism, which starts in Western Europe instead of Eastern Europe.

== Release and promotion ==
A version of Kaiserreich has existed for several games in the Hearts of Iron series since 2005, starting with versions made for Hearts of Iron II and Darkest Hour. The version for Hearts of Iron IV, developed by the KR4 Team, was first released on 1 December 2016. Since its release, the developers have made merchandise for the mod and short films that depict parts of the mod's lore.

== Reception ==
Kaiserreich has been received positively by critics, with many viewing its lore as surpassing the original game's setting. Timothy Borsilli of Wargamer wrote that Kaiserreich was a "rich, well-researched, and lovingly crafted world" that retained realism and fidelity and was designed for "maximum entertainment value." He believed that the base game was generally predictable, with player choice not having any major impact on the final result of the conflict due to being grounded to World War II, while Kaiserreich was a mod that "attacks" that problem.

Luke Plunkett of Kotaku shared similar thoughts, believing that while Hearts of Iron IV had limited variation in outcomes, Kaiserreich was a mod that opened an "infinite number of sliding doors moments every time you move," believing that every possible player choice was accounted for in order to increase immersion. He stated that Kaiserreich was one of his favorite video game mods, and that it was much more than what is generally viewed as a mod. PCGamesN's Joe Robinson echoed similar thoughts to Plunkett and Borsilli, writing that the mod was like a "well-written, perfectly paced war movie, with a slick setup, a rising arc of tension, and an explosive, climactic finale."

== See also ==
- Equestria at War
