= Nitemare 3D =

1994 video game

- Developer: Gray Design Associates
- Publisher: Accurate Research
- Designer: David P. Gray
- Artist: Denise M. Tyler
- Composer: David B. Schultz
- Platforms: MS-DOS, Windows 3.1x
- Release: MS-DOS: May 17, 1994; Windows 3.1 December 12, 1994
- Genre: First-person shooter
- Mode: Single-player

Nitemare 3D is a horror-themed first-person shooter released by Gray Design Associates in 1994 for MS-DOS and Windows 3.x. There are three episodes with the first episode released as shareware and ten levels in each. The full release came on two 3½" floppy disks with a guide to the game's thirty levels. According to author David P. Gray, the game is the first pixelated Windows game to use the WinG interface. Along with WinDoom also from 1994, a similar first-person shooter, Bad Toys, was released for Windows 3.1 in 1995.

The visuals are similar to those used in Wolfenstein 3D with perpendicular walls and no textures on the floors and ceilings. The music was composed by David B. Schultz who also composed for Quiver.

== Plot ==
Nitemare 3D follows the story of Hugo, from the Hugo trilogy, a series of graphic adventure PC games consisting of Hugo's House of Horrors, Hugo II, Whodunit?, and Hugo III, Jungle of Doom!. Penelope, Hugo's girlfriend, has been kidnapped by the evil Dr. Hammerstein for use in heinous experiments. Hugo must battle through Hammerstein's bizarre mansion, caverns complete with prisons and laboratories, and finally through a twisted alternate dimension of demons and aliens in an attempt to save her.

== Gameplay ==
Nitemare 3D's gameplay is puzzle-oriented. The four weapons (plasma gun, magic wand, pistol, and auto-repeat plasma gun) have different usages—for example, magic blasts are especially useful against magical creatures such as witches, whereas robots are strong against them. Meanwhile, vampires take heavy damage from silver bullets, but are strong against plasma gun. Each level in the game has numerous secret panels, some of which are for bonuses, but others are essential to completing the level. To make tasks easier, the player can collect magic eyes, which enable the player to activate a mini-map in the game's HUD and give hints as to the locations of panels, and crystal balls for displaying the location of enemies.

In a similar vein to id Software's Wolfenstein 3D and Doom, the player character's face is shown on the status bar and acts as a visual reflection of the player's health. It is also similar to the early Catacomb 3-D games.

== Reception ==
Reception

Award
Publication	Award
Ziff Davis	Best 1995 Shareware Game
