= Hearts of Iron =

2002 video game

- Developer: Paradox Development Studio
- Publishers: Microsoft Windows: NA: Strategy First, Atari SA (Platinum); SWE: PAN Vision AB; UK: Koch Media; Mac OS X: UK: Virtual Programming; NA: MacPlay
- Producer: Johan Andersson
- Designers: Henrik Fåhraeus; Joakim Bergqwist; Johan Andersson
- Programmers: Johan Andersson; Henrik Fåhraeus; Patric Backlund
- Artists: Dick Sjöström; Stefan Thulin; Marcus Edström
- Series: Hearts of Iron
- Engine: Europa Engine
- Platforms: Microsoft Windows, Mac OS X
- Release: Windows: NA: 27 November 2002; EU: 28 February 2003; Mac OS X: EU: 1 October 2003; NA: 7 October 2003; Hearts of Iron: Platinum: NA: 21 September 2004
- Genres: Grand strategy
- Modes: Single-player, multiplayer

Release timeline
2002	Hearts of Iron
2003
2004
2005	Hearts of Iron II
2006
2007
2008
2009	Hearts of Iron III
2010	Arsenal of Democracy: A Hearts of Iron Game
2011	Darkest Hour: A Hearts of Iron Game
2012
2013
2014
2015
2016	Hearts of Iron IV

Hearts of Iron is a 2002 grand strategy video game developed by Paradox Development Studio and originally published by Strategy First for Microsoft Windows. A Mac OS X version was released by Virtual Programming the following year. In 2004, Atari SA published Hearts of Iron: Platinum, an updated version that sought to improve several aspects of the game.

Hearts of Iron allows the player to take control of a nation in the world and guide it through World War II and the years immediately before and after it. Hearts of Iron is the first game in the eponymous series of grand strategy wargames. Despite receiving mixed reviews from critics, Hearts of Iron was followed by three additional games: Hearts of Iron II, Hearts of Iron III, and Hearts of Iron IV.

== Gameplay ==
Players play as a nation in the world in the years leading up to, during, and immediately after World War II. There are three main alliances in the game: the Allies, the Axis, and the Comintern. Nations in the game can attempt to join these alliances. Players can also control their nation's economy, government, and military. The game ends when there is only one alliance left or when the end date is reached; the winning alliance is determined through a victory point system, with points being given to alliances that control key regions or cities.

== Sequels ==
A sequel to Hearts of Iron, Hearts of Iron II, was released in 2005. Two spin-offs were created for Hearts of Iron II: Darkest Hour: A Hearts of Iron Game and Arsenal of Democracy. The third game in the series, Hearts of Iron III was released on 7 August 2009. Hearts of Iron – The Card Game was released as a free-to-play, browser-based collectible card game on 3 October 2011. East vs. West – A Hearts of Iron Game was scheduled to release in 2014, but was canceled. Hearts of Iron IV, the fourth main installment in the series, was released on 6 June 2016.

== Reception ==
Hearts of Iron

Aggregate score
Aggregator	Score
Metacritic	72/100

Review scores
Publication	Score
Computer Gaming World	3.5/5
Eurogamer	6/10
GameSpot	7/10
GameZone	7.5/10
IGN	8.5/10
PC Format	76%
PC Gamer (US)	90%
PC Zone	85%

The game received "average" reviews according to the review aggregation website Metacritic. Tom Chick of Computer Games Magazine summarized Hearts of Iron as "an ambitious mess, a noble mess, certainly a well-intentioned mess, but ultimately a mess nonetheless".

=== Hearts of Iron: Platinum ===
Hearts of Iron: Platinum

Aggregate score
Aggregator	Score
Metacritic	78/100

Review scores
Publication	Score
GameSpy	4/5
GameZone	8.6/10

Hearts of Iron: Platinum was released in 2004 with the intention of improving several elements of the original game. According to Metacritic, Hearts of Iron: Platinum received slightly more favorable reviews than the original Hearts of Iron.

=== Ban in China ===
The game was banned in the People's Republic of China because of the game's depiction of Taiwan under Japanese control and Tibet, Sinkiang, and Manchuria as independent nations. In the time period depicted in the game, Manchuria was a Japanese puppet state, Taiwan was under Japanese control, Sinkiang was partially under Soviet rule and other parts were part of the First and Second East Turkestan Republics, while Tibet was a de facto independent nation. The People's Republic of China recognises all as provinces of the nation, and refuses to allow recognition of history outside the Communist takeover in 1949.

== See also ==
- Chronology of grand strategy video games
- List of Paradox Interactive games
- List of World War II video games
