= WinG =

Windows 3.x graphics API

Calibration screen

WinG (pronounced Win Gee) is an application programming interface release in 1994 that was designed to provide faster graphics performance on Windows 3.x operating systems. It was initially positioned as a way to help game developers more easily port MS-DOS games to Windows. WinG was quickly discontinued in favor of DirectX.

== Background ==
WinG fixed two problems. The first problem that WinG fixed was that Windows 3.x did not support creating Device Contexts (DCs) based on device independent bitmaps, only actual display devices. One major limitation of the Graphics Device Interface (GDI) DCs was that they were write-only. Data, once written, could not be retrieved. The second problem was that all GDI drawing was implemented in the Windows 3.x video drivers. This included the drawing of bitmaps.

Alex St. John, one of the creators of DirectX, said in a 2000 interview that,

WinG was a technology being built by Chris Hecker in the research group, and at the time it was one of the small Microsoft Skunkworks projects, very low profile and off-the-wall. Basically it was fixing broken Windows drivers to make them run faster and more acceptably. Using it, we were actually able to create a video API that could run DOOM almost as fast under Windows as it did in DOS.

Microsoft announced WinG at the 1994 Game Developers Conference, demonstrating it with a port by id Software of Doom. WinG was shipped on September 21, 1994. WinG, while interesting, was still fundamentally based on drawing bitmaps in memory and outputting frames after the drawing was done. As a result, WinG was deprecated and DirectX was built. However, Windows NT 3.5 and Windows 95 introduced CreateDIBSection to provide support for creating DCs based on DIBs and video drivers also eventually improved.

== Implementation ==
WinG introduced a new type of device context called a WinGDC, allowing programmers to both read and write to it directly using device-independent bitmaps (DIBs) with the wingdib.drv driver. Programmers could write DIBs to the WinGDC and still have access to the individual bits of the image data. This meant that fast graphics algorithms could be written to allow fast scrolling, overdraw, dirty rectangles, double buffering, and other animation techniques. WinG provided much better performance when blitting graphics data to physical graphics device memory. Since WinG used the DIB format, it was possible to mix original GDI API calls and WinG calls.

WinG would also perform a graphics hardware/driver profiling test on the first execution of the program in order to determine the best way to draw DIBs. This test showed a window full of red curved lines, sections of which would wobble as performance was tested. Once WinG had determined the best approach, the results were saved to a profile.

== Support ==
WinG out-of-the-box support (i.e. as a separate API to Win32) was dropped in Windows 98 Second Edition (which integrated DirectX 6), as it did nothing but pass through to the Win32 APIs that it was wrapping (including CreateDIBSection). WinG DLLs were sometimes distributed with an application, at which point it merely became a matter of copying the files wing.dll, wing32.dll, wingde.dll, wingdib.drv and wingpal.wnd to the system32 directory (for 32 bit Windows) or SysWOW64 directory (for 64 bit Windows) to regain system-wide support.

== List of applications using WinG API ==
- Adobe Photoshop 3.0 (1994)
- Adobe Photoshop 4.0 (1997)
- Alone in the Dark: Ghosts in Town (1996)
- Bad Toys 3D (1995)
- CivNet (1995)
- Comix Zone (1995)
- Dark Seed II (1995)
- Disney's Animated Storybook: The Lion King (1994)
- Doom (1995)
- Dust: A Tale of the Wired West (1995)
- Entomorph - Plague of the Darkfall (1995)
- Fury3 (1995)
- Garfield: Caught in the Act (1996)
- Grant - Lee - Sherman: Civil War 2: Generals (1997)
- Heroes of Might and Magic II (1996)
- Industry Giant (1997)
- Lode Runner: The Legend Returns (1994)
- Star Wars Screen Entertainment (1994)
- Maui Mallard in Cold Shadow (1996)
- Microsoft Return of Arcade (1996)
- Microsoft Bob (1995)
- Microsoft Oceans (1995)
- Monopoly (Westwood Studios) (1995)
- Muppets Inside (1996)
- Nitemare 3D (1994)
- Noir: A Shadowy Thriller (1996)
- P.T.O. II (1995)
- Sid Meier's Civilization II (1996)
- Sid Meier's Colonization (1995)
- SimCity 2000 (Windows 16-bit) (1995)
- SimTower (1994)
- Sonic's Schoolhouse (1996)
- The Rise & Rule of Ancient Empires (1996)
- This Means War! (1995)
- Time Gate: Knight's Chase (1996)
- Titanic: Adventure Out of Time (1996)
- Total Distortion (1995)
- Toy Story (1996)
- Wages of War: The Business of Battle (1996)
- Warcraft II: Tides of Darkness (Map Editor) (1995)
- Warhammer: Shadow of the Horned Rat (1995)
- Wishbone Activity Zone (1997)
- Woodruff and the Schnibble of Azimuth (1995)

== See also ==
- Windows API
- DOSBox, allows emulation of DOS programs
