= East vs. West – A Hearts of Iron Game =

Cancelled 2014 grand strategy video game

- Developer: BL-Logic
- Publisher: Paradox Interactive
- Engine: Clausewitz Engine
- Platform: Microsoft Windows
- Release: Cancelled
- Genre: Real-time grand strategy
- Modes: Single-player, multiplayer

East vs. West – A Hearts of Iron Game is a cancelled grand strategy wargame set during the Cold War era between 1946 and 1991.

== Gameplay ==
East vs. West was not an expansion for Hearts of Iron III, but a standalone game. Like many of its predecessors in the Hearts of Iron series, East vs. West would have allowed the player to take control of and manage a country, including its political, diplomatic, espionage, economic, military, and technological aspects.

The game was to be set in the Cold War era, and wouldn't mainly focus on large-scale warfare. The use of nuclear weapons in game would have been possible, but it would've been limited by a nation's state of emergency.

=== Features ===
The main focus of the game was the diplomatic, political, economic, military, and espionage aspects of countries during the Cold War period and the decisions the player made regarding them.

Confirmed features included:

- New espionage system utilizing "spy cards".
- An extended political module.
- A Doomsday Clock indicating how close the in-game world is to total destruction.
- The presence of the United Nations to intervene in global events.
- The ability to customize ships.
- Nuclear arms race and warfare was to be expanded by a nuclear map mode, uranium as a resource, factories (centrifuges) to produce enriched fission material, ICBMs that could be launched from silos, nuclear submarines, and a red button.

The game was expected to retain many features included in Hearts of Iron III, such as control over the armed forces, the strategic warfare system, user mod-friendliness, and a multiplayer system with up to 32 players.

== Cancellation ==
No release date was scheduled for East vs. West after the initial Q1 2013 release date was missed. Following a decision to cut major features including multiplayer functionality from the game, the developers hoped to offer a pay-what-you-want public beta in March 2014. The cancellation of East vs. West was announced in a joint statement on 6 March 2014 by BL Logic and Paradox Interactive, citing multiple delays in the project.
