= Highway Hunter =

1994 video game

- Developer(s): Omega Integral Systems
- Publisher(s): Safari Software
- Designer(s): Alexander Safonov
- Artist(s): Serge Kuzmin
- Composer(s): Serge Shishkin
- Platform(s): MS-DOS
- Release: NA: 1994
- Genre(s): Vehicular combat
- Mode(s): Single-Player

Highway Hunter (Russian: Охотник на дороге) is vehicular combat game developed by Omega Integral Systems for MS-DOS compatible operating systems. It was published by the Safari Software label of Epic MegaGames in 1994.

== Plot ==
A hostile alien race has conquered the earth and enslaved the human race to do their bidding. The player assumes the role of a man who has worked in an alien maintenance garage, steals a prototype alien combat vehicle called the MASTER and escapes with it. The MASTER is used to fight the alien forces in a desperate bid to save the planet.

== Gameplay ==
The game uses a top-down view. The player's car is situated on a raised highway. The ground is visible on the sides. The player's car is constantly moving upwards through the level, though the player can maneuver the car around the screen within the boundaries of the highway. The player fires at enemies that come from the top of the screen. There are ground enemies on the highway and flying enemies that can come in from the sides or the top. Some enemies may drop weapon power ups, which make the player car's projectiles stronger or more numerous. The game is divided into three episodes, each with a number of levels, with a boss at the end of each level. The highway environments start out looking earthly, but the player moves into more alien levels later in the game.

== Reception ==
Reception

Review scores
Publication	Score
PC Zone	4 из 5
Top Secret	6,25 из 10
Secret Service	90%

The game was initially released as Highway Fighter before being re-released as Highway Hunter. According to a Home of the Underdogs review, while both versions shared similar graphics and gameplay mechanics, the original release featured significantly higher difficulty, with the reviewer unable to progress beyond the third level. The reviewer noted that the original version had a more user-friendly interface and contained several distinctly different levels. Polish magazine Top Secret's critics considered Highway Fighter's high difficulty to be one of its strengths. A Secret Service magazine reviewer praised the game's technical execution, noting that despite its Russian origin, it matched the quality of Western arcade products, though they pointed out some flaws including English translation errors.

In his Computer Gaming World review of Highway Hunter, Chuck Miller praised the game's graphics, music, and sound effects, comparing its smoothness and dynamic gameplay to arcade machines. However, he pointed out what he considered a genre-typical limitation: simplified driving mechanics that could lead to repetitive gameplay. German magazine PC Games noted that despite its seemingly complex plot, Highway Hunter was essentially a straightforward game featuring quality graphics and well-animated enemies. PC Zone's reviewer drew parallels between the game and Galaxians, with the addition of navigation on curved roads. While they considered the game nearly worthy of top marks, they found it less impressive when compared to the recently released Descent. A critic from German magazine Aktueller Software Markt drew comparisons between Highway Hunter game and Mad Max movie, highlighting the futuristic setting and the protagonist's powerful weaponry. They characterized the gameplay as a "typical shoot 'em up" with diverse weapons and power-ups, praising the auto-fire function while noting the challenge of eliminating certain enemies, particularly side-mounted guns and helicopters.

Russian gaming publications reviewed the localized version of Highway Hunter ("Охотник на дороге") favorably. Magazin Igrushek's review contrasted it with Omega Integral Systems' previous title Frantis: Mission 2, favoring Highway Hunter for its complete Russian localization and classic shooter gameplay. The reviewer referenced Xenon 2 Megablast and Zanac as comparable titles but considered Highway Hunter to be more compelling, analogizing the difference to that between Heretic and Doom. Virtualnye Miry magazine described it as an engaging arcade game influenced by Xenon 2, emphasizing its 15-level structure and technical merits in graphics and sound implementation.
