= Hugo III, Jungle of Doom! =

1992 video game

- Developer: Gray Design Associates
- Publisher: Gray Design Associates
- Designer: David Gray
- Artist: Gary Sirois
- Platforms: MS-DOS, Windows
- Release: NA: 1992
- Genre: Adventure
- Mode: Single-player

Hugo III, Jungle of Doom! (named Hugo's Amazon Adventure in the Hugo Trilogy re-release) is a text parser-based adventure game designed by independent software developer David P. Gray and published as shareware for MS-DOS by Gray Design Associates in 1992.

It follows Hugo's House of Horrors (1990) and Hugo II, Whodunit? (1991). The game uses the same text command format of the previous games and is the first game in the series to with custom artwork in every scene.

== Plot ==
Following the events of Hugo II, Whodunit?, Hugo and Penelope depart from Great Uncle Horace's mansion by plane, only to crash in the Amazon rainforest. While exploring, Penelope is bitten by a large venomous spider. A native from the nearby tribe tells Hugo that he needs to find water from a magic lagoon, but Hugo finds that a streaming waterfall blocks his path. He visits the tribe to trade for supplies and escapes capture from a witch doctor. Then he finds an elephant and stuns it with a blowgun. The elephant lands in a stream, blocking it and cutting off the supply to the waterfall. Hugo goes to the lagoon, collects the water, and returns to heal Penelope before the two take off for home once more.

== Gameplay ==
Hugo III retains the gameplay of the previous entries in the series. Hugo is controlled by the arrow keys on the keyboard, and other actions are input through the text parser at the bottom of the screen. This allows Hugo to describe what he sees, pick up objects, and interact with the environment. The game also provides a save/load function and a boss key to hide the program. In the Hugo Trilogy release, the text parser is supplemented by a point and click interface. Hugo III is the shortest game in the series.

== Development ==
Artist Gary Sirois' talent for drawing trees led to the game's jungle setting.

The first two Hugo games were solo projects by David P. Gray, but with Hugo III, Gray enlisted the help of computer artist Gary Sirois for the game's graphics. Sirois' talent for drawing trees led to the game taking place in a jungle, though having the graphics professionally done increased the production cost and consequently caused the game to be the shortest in the series. Gray has admitted to having confusion in geography, transposing African elements such as an elephant to the South American locale. Hugo's character design has been noted for looking similar to Indiana Jones. Gray maintains this was not intentional, though admits to perhaps a subconscious influence, going on to state that Tarzan was a greater influence. Hugo III also features a few minor technical improvements from the first two, such as a perspective system that changes Hugo's size as he moves deeper into the playing field and a hint system if players get stuck.

== Reception ==
Andrew Morin of Adventure Classic Gaming praised the improved art design and the lower difficulty compared to the game's predecessors as well as the game's humor. Richard Cobbett of PC Gamer also praised the game art designed, but criticized the game as not being fun. Hugo III had no direct sequels, but the characters of Hugo and Penelope reappeared as the main characters of Nitemare 3D.
