= Heroes of the 357th =

1991 combat flight simulation video game

- Publisher: Electronic Arts
- Platform: MS-DOS
- Release: 1991
- Genre: Combat flight simulation

Heroes of the 357th is a combat flight simulation game developed by Canadian studio Midnight Software for MS-DOS and published in 1991 by Electronic Arts.

== Gameplay ==
Heroes of the 357th is a World War II combat flight simulator. The game is based on the actual missions flown by the 357th squadron (the Yoxford Boys) and their P-51 Mustangs. The action takes place in skies over France and Germany.

== Reception ==
In 1996, Computer Gaming World declared Heroes of the 357th the 30th-worst computer game ever released.
