= Hearts of Iron III =

2009 video game

- Developer: Paradox Development Studio
- Publisher: Paradox Interactive
- Producer: Johan Andersson
- Designers: Johan Andersson; Christopher King
- Programmers: Thomas Johansson; Henrik Fåhraeus
- Artists: Jonas Jakobsson; Fredrik Toll
- Composer: Andreas Waldetoft
- Series: Hearts of Iron
- Engine: Clausewitz Engine
- Platforms: Microsoft Windows, OS X
- Release: Microsoft Windows: NA: 7 August 2009; UK: 14 August 2009; AU: 24 September 2009; OS X: WW: 7 December 2009
- Genres: Grand strategy
- Modes: Single-player, multiplayer

Hearts of Iron III is a 2009 grand strategy video game developed by Paradox Development Studio and published by Paradox Interactive for Microsoft Windows. A Mac OS X version was released the same year. A grand strategy wargame that focuses on World War II, it is the sequel to 2005's Hearts of Iron II and the third main installment in the Hearts of Iron series.

Initially, the game received a mixed reception, largely because of the large number of bugs present in the game at release. After several patches, the game's reception improved. In December 2009, it had an average score of 77 on Metacritic. A sequel, Hearts of Iron IV, was released on June 6, 2016.

== Gameplay ==
Hearts of Iron III allows the player to take control of any nation in the world and guide that nation through World War II. The player controls virtually every aspect of their country, including production, research, diplomacy, warfare, politics. and espionage. The game centers around three factions: the Axis (led by Germany), the Allies (led by the United Kingdom), and the Comintern (led by the Soviet Union). All other nations can slowly align with one of the factions. Nations are more likely to side with factions that they are ideologically and diplomatically aligned with. The player can use a multitude of different divisions, fleets, and warplanes to engage in combat with enemy forces.

== Development ==
The first trailer from the Games Convention in Leipzig showed new features such as 3D graphics, possible due to the new Clausewitz Engine. Paradox also released a series of developer diaries and video showcases.

Although happy with the scope of Hearts of Iron II, lead designer Johan Andersson wanted to improve upon every aspect of the game, starting again with a new engine. The game's artificial intelligence (AI) was designed to be able to achieve strategic objectives and control forces delegated to it, including whole theatres of operation. The AI can also remember and compare strategic possibilities as circumstances change. Changing to 3D graphics helped improve other areas, as Andersson explained:

Going 3D meant we could do another type of architecture where we could support more screen resolutions, and develop our maps in a quicker way. The biggest advantage from going 3D though was the ability to offload more to the GPU. With the machine advances during the last decade this gives us the biggest benefits in development when it comes to gameplay and AI.

Paradox had a vision for the style of the map, given that the player would spend the majority of their time looking at it: "[...] to create a map that feels like a WW2 map, like it could be a map which... a commander in the War would be looking at himself". The content of the map was also altered; the number of provinces was increased to more than 15,000 over Hearts of Iron II's 2,600. Customizable divisions were also added, each one containing two to five brigades. Each brigade increases the division's combat power and cost.

== Reception ==
Reception

Review scores
Publication	Score
GameSpot	8.5/10
IGN	8.5/10
PC Gamer (UK)	81/100
PC Zone	60/100
GamerLimit	75/100
Smartyweb!	65/100

Hearts of Iron III initially received a mixed reception because the game shipped with a large number of bugs in the early release. After several patches eliminated many bugs, reception improved and the game received generally positive reviews. In 2009 December it had a combined average of a 77 on Metacritic and a 79% on Gamerankings.

GamePro wrote, "Perhaps the worst problem is the interface itself, or more specifically, the amount of feedback it affords the player. In contrast to the old system, there is no instant way to assess how many divisions you have in each province, nor important values like their units' organization or combat values".

On the other hand, the game has been praised as being "tailored for experienced strat heads and wargamers with a lot of patience, but the game is more accessible than either of its predecessors and a great jumping-on point for new players who want to make the leap into a grand strategy epic".

== Expansion packs ==
Expansions timeline
2010	Semper Fi
2011	For The Motherland
2012	Their Finest Hour

Paradox Interactive released three expansion packs for Hearts of Iron III.

On 6 June 2010, the expansion pack called Hearts of Iron III: Semper Fi was released. The Mac OS X version of the expansion was shipped from Virtual Programming on 23 July 2010. A second expansion pack named Hearts of Iron III: For the Motherland was announced on 27 January 2011. and released on 28 June 2011. The Mac OS X version of the expansion was shipped from Virtual Programming on 28 September 2011. On 22 November 2011, Paradox Interactive released the Hearts of Iron III Collection, which includes both expansions for Hearts of Iron III as well as all previously released sprite packs. On 6 June 2012, Paradox Interactive announced the third and last expansion called Hearts of Iron III: Their Finest Hour. It was released on 26 September 2012. The Mac OS X version shipped from Virtual Programming on November 9, 2012.

== See also ==
- List of grand strategy video games
- List of Paradox Interactive games
- List of World War II video games
- Hearts of Iron II
- Darkest Hour: A Hearts of Iron Game
- Hearts of Iron IV
- Downloadable content
