= Hyper 3-D Pinball =

1996 video game

- cover of PAL version
- Developer: NMS Software
- Publisher: Virgin Interactive Entertainment
- Platforms: MS-DOS, PlayStation, Saturn
- Release: MS-DOS; December 1995; PlayStation, Saturn; 1996

Hyper 3-D Pinball is a pinball simulation video game developed by British studio NMS Software and published in 1995 and 1996 by Virgin Interactive Entertainment for MS-DOS, PlayStation, and Saturn. The game is known as Tilt! in some regions.

== Gameplay ==
Up to four players can choose between multiple viewing perspectives, including a top-down 2D view and a 3D full-table view.

There are six tables, each with a particular theme: "Fun Fair", "Star Quest 2049", "The Gangster", "The Monster", "Roadking U.S.A.", and "Myst & Majik".

The game emulates authentic pinball mechanics, including responsive flippers, bumpers, and the ability to nudge or “tilt” the table to influence ball trajectory.

Animations are played when locking balls and hitting various other shots.

The game supports English, Dutch, and French languages for the game’s menus and text.

== Development ==
On PC, the game supports 320 x 200, 640 x 480, and 800 x 600 resolutions, but only the 640x480 resolution supports all three view options, with some requiring more RAM.

== Reception ==
Reception

Review scores
| Publication | Score |
|---|---|
| AllGame | SSAT: 4/5 |
| Computer Gaming World | PC: 5/5 |
| Electronic Gaming Monthly | SSAT: 80% |
| GameSpot | SSAT: 5.9 |
| Next Generation | PC: 4/5 |
| PC Gamer (UK) | PC: 90 |
| Absolute PlayStation | PS: 7/10 |
| Intelligent Gamer | SSAT: C− |

Next Generation gave the MS-DOS version of the game four stars out of five; although generally commending the title, they noticed that some elements are missing, such as control of tilt sensitivity, number of balls, and table angles. Computer Gaming World found the tables to be beautiful and target rich. PC Gamer praised the graphics and audio (with the soundtrack played directly from the CD), and said the game would be near perfect if it had lower system requirements, and had a few more options such as the ability to adjust the table angle.

The Saturn version was praised for having "near perfect" controls, the sound was also praised. The graphics were commended for looking good, but the ball was found to move too quickly in the 2D view, with the ball easier to track in the 3D view, but with parts of the table obscured. In contrast, Intelligent Gamer found the game to be bland and misrepresentative to call it "Hyper" or "3-D". The physics of the ball were poor. In 1998, Saturn Power ranked the game 94th on their Top 100 Sega Saturn Games saying the game is worth a few tries.

Absolute PlayStation found the music tracks and sound effects to be excellent apart from on the "Myst & Majik" table, and the reviewer enjoyed the tables in the 2D views but recommended to avoid playing on the 3D setting. The game was declared good value for money.
