= Darkest Hour: A Hearts of Iron Game =

2011 video game

- Developer: Martin Ivanov
- Publisher: Paradox Interactive
- Engine: Europa Engine
- Platform: Microsoft Windows
- Release: WW: 5 April 2011
- Genres: Real-time Grand strategy
- Modes: Single-player, multiplayer

Darkest Hour: A Hearts of Iron Game is a 2011 grand strategy video game developed by Martin Ivanov and published by Paradox Interactive. It is the first installment in the Hearts of Iron series to not be developed by Paradox Development Studio, instead being developed by a team of independent developers led by Ivanov; Paradox let them use their in-house Europa Engine.

In Darkest Hour, as is the case with other Hearts of Iron titles, the player can take control of almost any country that existed in the game's timeframe, which spans from 1914-1920 or 1933–1964 depending on the scenario. Management of the state includes its political, diplomatic, espionage, economic, military, and technological aspects. The game was released on 5 April 2011.

== Description ==
Darkest Hour is, at its core, an evolution of Hearts of Iron II: Armageddon. This has been considered crucial by the development team to make it easy to port community-made modifications from Hearts of Iron II to Darkest Hour. Moreover, the most important changes to the engines have been added as mods to the core game, with the name Darkest Hour Light and Darkest Hour Full:

- Darkest Hour (core game): this version is focused on compatibility with Hearts of Iron 2 Armageddon and all mods available for it. The number of changed files has been kept as low as possible and all-new options are disabled or set as close as possible to the original settings.
- Darkest Hour Light: this version is available as a mod with only a few changes from HOI2, but nearly all new features are enabled.
- Darkest Hour Full: this version is available as a mod without any compatibility with HOI2 and implements or reworks many new features, the most visible difference being the new map and research system.

== Gameplay ==
Darkest Hour Full provides different grand campaign scenarios (where it is possible to choose any of the nations involved) or battle scenarios (focused on single theaters of operations, with only a few nations involved and playable).

The scenarios are:

- 1914 - The Great War (starting on June 27, 1914)
- 1936 - The Road to Another War (starting on January 1, 1936)

The player can build land divisions, aircraft fleets, and naval ships/fleets, and combine these into corps and armies. The player also has the ability to control the appointment of military leaders of land, air and naval units as well as to control the appointment of individual government ministers and military commanders in key General Staff positions. The player can declare war, make alliances, claim and annex territories. The player can also alter the social and economic policies of their nation using sliders, such as democratic versus authoritarian, free market versus central planning and so on. Moving the sliders would result in different bonuses and penalties, allowing for a range of choices and strategies. Technological research is also controlled by the player. All this is on a global scale, with the player simultaneously dealing and interacting with nations across the world. The game can be paused at any point.

The game provides a launcher that allows the player to change its settings (like resolution, language, etc.) and eventually choose a mod to run on top of it.

The 1.02 patch, released on November 11, 2011 added four new grand campaign scenarios and new functionalities (infantry units can now have two brigades and it is possible to upgrade a unit to a different model, for example, a simple infantry unit can be upgraded to a motorized unit). The four new scenarios are:

- 1933 - Day of Decision (starting on March 4, 1933)
- 1940 - Burning Europe (starting on May 10, 1940)
- 1941 - Awakening the Giant (starting on June 22, 1941)
- 1942 - Enemy at the Gate (starting on November 22, 1942)

With the 1.03 patch, further scenarios were added:

- 1939 - Invasion of Poland
- 1943 - Allied Invasion of Sicily
- 1944 - Allied Landing in Normandy
- 1945 - Battle of the Bulge

Furthermore, two battle scenarios were added. In these, the player can choose between a small number of nations. The battle scenarios focus on specific battles or wars:

- 1904 - Russo-Japanese War
- 1939 - Invasion of Poland

The latest patch version is 1.05, released in December 2017. A hotfix, 1.05.1, was released in February 2018 with a second hotfix, 1.05.2, released in June 2022.

== Development ==
Darkest Hour was first announced on September 14, 2010, by Paradox Interactive. The game became possible due to Paradox licensing its Europa Engine, in 2008, to independent developers.

== Expansion packs ==
The Iron Cross expansion for Hearts of Iron II and Arsenal of Democracy: A Hearts of Iron Game is also compatible with Darkest Hour.

== Community mods ==
Many mods designed for Hearts of Iron II: Armageddon were also converted to Darkest Hour. The most popular of these mods are: Kaiserreich (alternate history where Central Powers won World War I), the Total Realism Project Mod (Historical challenge mod for single and multiplayer), the Fallout Mod Fallout's Doomsday (set in the world of Fallout games), and Mod33 (rework of the game, beginning in 1933).

Other community mods include World in Flames II, which provides a more challenging German campaign, and The Grand Campaign 1914-1991, which lets players start from the 1914 scenario and play up to the year 1991. The New World Order mod allows users to play up to 1991 and focuses on the Cold War between the US and USSR. Similarly, the Fatherland Mod features an alternate timeline where Germany has won WWII and fights a Cold War against the USA. Another alternate history mod is The Bonaparte Legacy where CSA won the American Civil War and the Franco-Prussian war didn't happen leading to French Empire losing WW1 and becoming a national-socialist state in the 1930s.

Kaiserreich was released the same day as the game. Mod33 was released on 27 August 2011. The same year in September, the mod Arms, Armistice, and Revolutions (AAR) was made available, which linked the 1914 scenario to the classical 1933/1936 grand campaign. There were also plans to integrate the mod into the main Darkest Hour game in future patches. AAR was developed as an open project, and thus players were free to participate in development. AAR later formed the basis for The Grand Campaign 1914-1991 mod.

A group of modders created a spiritual successor in Hearts of Iron IV known as "Darkest Hour: A HOI4 Mod"

== See also ==
- List of grand strategy video games
- List of Paradox Interactive games
- List of PC games
