= Hydroneer =

- Developer: Foulball Hangover
- Publisher: Foulball Hangover
- Programmer: Max Hayon
- Engine: Unreal Engine 4
- Platforms: Windows; PlayStation 5; Xbox Series X/S
- Release: May 8, 2020: Playstation 5, Xbox Series X/S; WW: May 8 2026
- Genres: Sandbox, Construction and management simulation

Hydroneer is a 2020 mining sandbox video game developed by British indie video game studio Foulball Hangover. It was released onto Steam on May 8, 2020, and on the PS5 and Xbox Series X/S on May 8, 2026, on the game's sixth anniversary.

== Gameplay ==
Hydroneer is a physics-based sandbox mining simulation game in which players build and manage an increasingly automated excavation operation in a small open world. Gameplay centers on extracting soil, processing it to obtain valuable resources such as gold, iron, and gemstones, and reinvesting profits into progressively more advanced tools, machines, and infrastructure to expand efficiency and scale.

At the start of the game, players are provided with a basic plot of land, a nearby water source, and simple hand tools, including a shovel, a pan or bucket, and rudimentary equipment for washing and sorting dirt. Early progression is slow and largely manual, requiring the player to dig by hand, transport soil containers, and repeatedly wash and sift material to uncover small quantities of ore and gems. The game has no inventory system and players are required to move items around using only their hands. As income increases, players can purchase new parcels of land, water intake pipes, and powered devices, allowing for more efficient extraction and processing of resources.

== Development ==
Developer Foulball Hangover is based in the United Kingdom. The game received a creative mode feature in an update on November 4, 2021.

Multiplayer mode was added in an update on 2022. An expansion called "Journey to Volcalidus" was released in April 2024, adding a new area and town, as well as a new vehicle and mining mechanics.

It eventually sold over 500,000 copies.
