= Hugo's House of Horrors =

1990 video game

- Developer: Gray Design Associates
- Publisher: Gray Design Associates
- Designer: David P. Gray
- Platforms: MS-DOS, Windows
- Release: MS-DOS: NA: January 1, 1990; Windows; 1995
- Genre: Adventure
- Mode: Single-player

Hugo's House of Horrors is a text parser-based adventure game for MS-DOS designed by independent software developer David P. Gray. It was published as shareware in 1990. A version for Windows was released in 1995 as Hugo's Horrific Adventure.

The game follows the character Hugo as he searches for his girlfriend Penelope in a haunted house. To progress through the game, the player uses items and interacts with the environment to solve puzzles and access more rooms in the house. The gameplay was inspired by Leisure Suit Larry in the Land of the Lounge Lizards. Hugo's House of Horrors was praised for its environment and atmosphere, but was criticized for its plot and visual design. It was followed by two sequels: Hugo II, Whodunit? and Hugo III, Jungle of Doom!, and a spin-off first-person shooter game, Nitemare 3D.

== Gameplay ==
Hugo's House of Horrors is a parser-based adventure game, and the player interacts with the game by typing commands into the parser. This includes actions such as looking or grabbing items. Some synonyms are recognized and work as alternative inputs. Most puzzles are solved by using an item in the inventory to interact with the environment. The player controls Hugo's movement with the arrow keys on the keyboard. Pressing the key starts Hugo's movement, and pressing it again makes him stop. The numeric keypad is also supported, which allows diagonal movement.

Picking up items and completing certain actions gives the player points, and the points counter will reach its maximum once the player has completed every action and finished the game. Hugo's House of Horrors allows the player to freely save and load at any point, and it provides a boss key to hide the program. The game is short and can be completed in under ten minutes if a player is familiar with the required actions. In the Hugo Trilogy release, the text parser is replaced by a point and click interface.

As with many adventure games of the time, some puzzles result in an immediate game over if the player responds incorrectly, and the game can become unwinnable if certain items are not collected while they are available. This includes four different points in which the player must react immediately to avoid a game over. This sometimes means that the correct command must be typed and ready to submit before the player enters the next room.

== Plot ==
The plot of Hugo's House of Horrors is limited to what is necessary to explain the game's premise. Hugo ventures to a haunted house after his girlfriend, Penelope, goes there for a babysitting job and gets kidnapped. As he explores the house, he finds a vicious hungry dog, a mad scientist, and a dining room full of classic horror monsters. No explanation is given for why these characters are present in the house or what their motivations are. Hugo discovers a secret cave underneath the house where he evades a mummy and then encounters an old man who asks him trivia questions before letting him pass. Hugo answers the man's questions and goes into the next room to find Penelope. He frees her, and the two escape from the house.

== Development ==
Hugo stands in the main hall after entering the house. The help key, the player's score, and the sound toggle are all displayed above. The parser is displayed below.

Hugo's House of Horrors was a one-man project created by David P. Gray. According to Gray, he pursued self-employment after worrying about job security, and he chose software development after a chance encounter with a gynecologist who made money writing computer programs on the side. He founded Gray Design Associates, initially producing business oriented software before switching to video games. He had previous experience designing video games from practicing with the vector graphics system provided to him while he worked for the UK Ministry of Defence. Gray developed Hugo's House of Horrors in 1989.

Gray described Leisure Suit Larry in the Land of the Lounge Lizards as the inspiration for the gameplay in Hugo's House of Horrors. He had noted the long list of credits for the game and wished to produce a similar game entirely on his own. The alliterative title was chosen as a tribute to Leisure Suit Larry, as it allowed the executable file to be titled HHH.exe, similar to Leisure Suit Larry's LLL.exe. The gameplay is similar to that used by the Adventure Game Interpreter, the game engine used for games such as King's Quest, Space Quest, and Police Quest. Gray also took inspiration from the character design in Captain Comic.

Gray's goal in designing the game was to replicate the atmosphere he felt when he first played Colossal Cave Adventure. He likened the opening scene of Hugo's House of Horrors to text adventure games that start in front of a house. Gray intentionally did not include lengthy exposition or instructions in Hugo's House of Horrors, saying that he was impatient with these things in games. He determined that anyone who could not figure out the first puzzle themselves would probably not enjoy the game anyway. There is little dialogue in the game, and most text that appears are simple explanations of what is happening in the room. Hugo's House of Horrors uses a 16 color palette, and music and sound effects are limited to chiptune sounds produced by the PC speaker. The original game requires an IBM PC compatible computer with Enhanced Graphics Adapter or Video Graphics Array. More recent computers cannot run the game, but it is compatible with DOS emulators such as DOSBox.

Keith Stuart of The Guardian cited Hugo's House of Horrors as an early example of an indie game with horror elements. The game features several horror-themed elements, including a haunted mansion, a lightning storm, and bats. The haunted house premise arose from a cartoon image of a haunted house that Gray had purchased, choosing to design the game around this image. Gray cited Hammer House of Horror as an inspiration for the game's theme, including the character of Dr. Hamerstein, a mad scientist.

== Release ==
Gray released Hugo's House of Horrors on January 1, 1990. He first released it by uploading it to CompuServe forums and it saw success as a shareware game. The game was a commonly featured entry in shareware adventure game compilations. According to Gray, it was the first graphical adventure game to be released as shareware. He attributed its success to the relatively limited selection of such games in shareware. After it was successful as shareware, Gray sold a retail version of the game through different vendors before signing with Sofsource. Unlike most shareware games, there were no differences in the shareware and retail versions of the game. Instead, the retail version included a book of hints. The shareware version also allowed paid registration, and according to Gray, this earned him six times as much income as the retail version. The registered version also included the book of hints.

Hugo's House of Horrors was re-released on Windows in 1995 as part of the Hugo Trilogy. When porting the game to Windows 3.1, Gray replaced the parser-based gameplay with a point-and-click interface inspired by Beneath a Steel Sky, and he added new sound effects using Sound Blaster. The original DOS game was written in Microsoft Quick C, and the port to Windows was written in Microsoft Visual C++. The point-and-click version of the game is titled Hugo's Horrific Adventure. By 2008, Gray said that he had forgotten why he changed the name.

== Reception ==
Lee Perkins of The Age listed Hugo's House of Horrors as an example of a popular high quality shareware game in 1993. Meghann O'Neill of PC Gamer praised the game's focus on exploration and puzzles without excessive exposition. Richard Cobbett of PC Gamer criticized the game for its poor art design, its limited puzzles, its lack of narrative, and its short length. Reece Warrender of Adventure Gamers praised the game's atmosphere but criticized it for its sound design, counter-intuitive puzzles, and limited parser vocabulary. Gray himself acknowledged weaknesses in the game, describing it as short game with "rudimentary" graphics and little plot.

Players often compare Hugo's House of Horrors to the point-and-click adventure game Maniac Mansion, which features a similar premise and humor. Gray has responded that he had never played Maniac Mansion and was only aware of the similarities after Hugo's House of Horrors was released. Hugo's parser-based gameplay was already outdated by the time the game was created, as Maniac Mansion had already popularized the SCUMM game engine.

== Legacy ==
Gray created two sequels for Hugo's House of Horrors: Hugo II, Whodunit? and Hugo III, Jungle of Doom!. Nitemare 3D, a first-person shooter created by Gray, also features the characters of Hugo and Penelope and the same general plot as Hugo's House of Horrors. Fan versions of Hugo's House of Horrors have since been created. An unlicensed port was created using Adventure Game Studio in 2001, but was taken down after Gray issued a cease and desist letter. A surrealist choose-your-own-adventure modification of the game titled HHH was created as part of the 2014 Interactive Fiction Competition.
