= Harvester (video game) =

1996 video game

- European box art
- Developer: DigiFX Interactive
- Publishers: NA: Merit Studios; EU: Virgin Interactive
- Producer: Lee Jacobson
- Designer: Gilbert P. Austin
- Platforms: MS-DOS, Windows, Linux
- Release: NA: September 24, 1996; EU: 1996
- Genres: Interactive film, adventure
- Mode: Single-player

Harvester is a point-and-click adventure game written and directed by Gilbert P. Austin and developed by DigiFX Interactive. It was published for MS-DOS, Windows, and Linux in North America on September 24, 1996. Players take the role of Steve Mason, an 18-year-old man who awakens in the fictional Texas town of Harvest in 1953, with amnesia. Over the next week, he is coerced or manipulated into performing a series of tasks with increasingly violent consequences at the behest of The Order of the Harvest Moon, a cult-like organization which seems to dominate the town and which promises to reveal the truth about Steve and how he found himself in Harvest. The game is known for its violent content and its meta-commentary examination of violence, and has garnered a cult following.

== Gameplay ==
The game has a point and click interface. Players must visit locations within the game's fictional town of Harvest via an overhead map. By speaking to various townspeople and clicking on special "hotspots", players can learn information and collect items that progress the game's story and play. Harvester also features a fighting system where players can attack other characters by selecting a weapon and then clicking on the target. Both the target and the player's character have a limited amount of health available, allowing for either the player or the target to die. Players can choose to progress through the game by solving puzzles or by killing non-playable characters.

== Plot ==
Teenager Steve Mason awakens in the small Texas farming town of Harvest in the year 1953, with no memories of his past or who he is. Exploring his home, he discovers that he does not recognize his mother or younger brother, both of whom act strangely—his mother compulsively bakes cookies for a charity event a week away, causing her to throw out each subsequent batch; and his brother obsessively watches an ultra-violent cowboy show that is the only program broadcast on Harvest televisions.

Exploring the town, Steve discovers Harvest is populated by hostile, strange individuals whom he likens to facsimiles or parodies of real people. Steve learns that no one believes him to genuinely be amnesiac, with every citizen he meets responding to his pleas for help with the canned response "You always were a kidder, Steve." Everyone in town encourages Steve to join the Lodge, a large building (reminiscent of the Hagia Sophia) located at the center of town that serves as the headquarters of the Order of the Harvest Moon, which is the sociopolitical center of life in Harvest and whose members act instead of a mayor or city council.

Learning that he is set to be married in two weeks, Steve goes to meet his fiancée, Stephanie Pottsdam, the daughter of Mr. Pottsdam, an unemployed man who hopes to get a job alongside Steve's father working in Harvest's meat packing plant and who spies on his daughter via a peephole in her bedroom wall. Meeting Stephanie, Steve finds that she, too, has amnesia, and woke up the same morning as him with no idea of how she got to Harvest. The two form an alliance to figure out their past and escape the town.

Steve visits the Sergeant at Arms at the Lodge, who tells him that all of his questions will be answered inside the building, and sets about giving him a series of tasks that serve as initiation rites. Over the next week, Steve is given a new "task" each day, beginning with petty acts of vandalism that escalate to theft and arson, with each task having unforeseen, tragic circumstances that result in someone's accidental death, murder, or suicide. Meanwhile, driven by their mutual fear and reliance on one another, Steve and Stephanie may become lovers.

On the final day of his initiation, Steve discovers a mutilated skull and spinal cord in Stephanie's bed, which the Sergeant at Arms tells him is his invitation to the Lodge. Venturing inside, Steve discovers that the Lodge is composed of a series of rooms called "Temples" which serve as mordant burlesques of real civic locations (including a room with a dead family and a kitchen where a chef prepares human meat) and whose inhabitants challenge him with a series of puzzles meant to teach lessons integral to understanding the precepts of the lodge. Each "lesson" turns out to be an inversion of traditional morality, including the futility of charity, the uselessness of the elderly, and the benefits of lust and vanity.

At the highest level of the Lodge, the sergeant at arms presents a still-living Stephanie and explains that Harvest is an elaborate virtual reality simulator being operated by a group of scientists to determine if it is possible to turn average humans into serial killers. Steve and Stephanie are the only real people in the simulation, and everything Steve has experienced has been intended to warp his reality and break down his inhibitions to prepare him for life as a serial killer. The sergeant offers him two options: murder Stephanie, committing his first real crime and accepting a future as a murderer; or refuse, in which case the scientists will render both Steve and Stephanie brain dead in the laboratory. Should Steve choose the second option, the sergeant informs him that he and Stephanie will experience an entire lifetime of happiness in the Harvest simulator in the seconds before they die in the real world.

If the player chooses to kill Stephanie, Steve bludgeons Stephanie to death and removes her skull and spinal cord. After the murder is complete, Steve awakens in the laboratory and gleefully informs the scientists that he enjoyed the experience. Hitchhiking home, he murders the driver who picks him up. Later, while he plays a violent video game in his bedroom, Steve's mother chastises him for doing so, as it will induce violent impulses in him. Steve laughs as the camera enters his throat and stomach, revealing the dissolving body parts of the driver he killed earlier.

If the player chooses to spare Stephanie, the sergeant at arms performs an impromptu wedding in the chapel before letting the pair go. Steve and Stephanie buy a home, have a child, and grow old together before dying peacefully and being buried in the Harvest cemetery. In real life, the scientists express disappointment at the results of their experiment as they look on at the pair's dead bodies.

== Development and controversy ==
Harvester was developed by FutureVision (renamed DigiFX by the time of the game's release). Writer-director Gilbert P. Austin recounted:

My feeling was that FutureVision, being a small company, would need something "high concept" to compete with the industry giants of the time, and I argued that Harvester was exactly that idea. It was really the only idea that I pitched. I remember that it came to me in a flash. That's how I get a lot of my ideas, in creative rushes where I can barely write fast enough to get it all down. [...] The concept of Harvester, the idea that at the end of the game I wanted the player to mull over whether he had internalized the over-the-top violence and surreal imagery of the game in the same manner that Steve had, and the primary ending... all this was in the initial concept that I jotted down in one of those small reporter spiral notepads in about 30 minutes. That's what I pitched to FutureVision, and they bought it.

Harvester was announced at the Consumer Electronics Show (CES) in January 1994 in Las Vegas. The game had a budget of $1 million. The video footage was filmed in the back warehouse of publisher Merit Software. Though he was only contracted as the game's writer, Austin voluntarily directed the filming to ensure it stayed true to his vision for the game. Austin finished the creative work in Autumn 1994 and moved on to other projects, leaving producer Lee Jacobson in sole charge of the remaining development. The game was set to be released the same year, but the programming took two years to finish, and it became a commercial failure.

In a December 1996 press conference, family psychologist David Walsh released a list of excessively violent games. Jacobson publicly demanded that Harvester, which was not included in Walsh's list, be added to it. Gaming journalist Christian Svensson described Jacobson's actions as "shameless", and did not refer to Jacobson, DigiFX, or Harvester by name so as not to provide positive reinforcement for publicity seeking.

In Germany, the game was banned.

The game was designed by DigiFX Interactive and published by Merit Studios in 1996. On March 6, 2014, Lee Jacobson re-released it on GOG.com, for PC and Mac. On April 4, 2014, Nightdive Studios re-released it on Steam for PC and Linux.

== Reception ==
Reception

Aggregate score
Aggregator	Score
Metacritic	53/100

Review scores
Publication	Score
Adventure Gamers	2.5/5
AllGame	2/5
GameSpot	6.8/10
PC Gamer (US)	82/100
Entertainment Weekly	B+

Harvester received "mixed or average" reviews, according to review aggregator Metacritic. PC Gamer gave Harvester a positive review upon its initial release, but panned it in a 2011 review where they called it the "goriest, most confusing, and above all stupidest horror game ever." Allgame remarked that the game's delayed release negatively impacted its reception, as the game felt dated when it was finally released. They felt that this was indicative of the game as a whole, as "conversations with characters are frustrating and often make little sense, plus the manner in which the plot develops is disappointing. [...] there are things that are never explained, and the final third of the game is dull and pointless." GameSpot's review was mixed, as they felt that there was "nothing actually revolutionary going on in Harvester" but praised the game's full-motion video segments as "truly disturbing" and commented that it had "tried-and-true adventure mechanics with entertaining twists". Entertainment Weekly's Bob Strauss commented that "this gratuitously violent game doesn't make much sense, but it is a lot of twisted fun."

In 2018, Daniel Kurland of Bloody Disgusting published a retrospective review of the game, in which he wrote: "Harvester is so over the top in its violence, sex, and taboo impulses that it almost initially feels like a joke. Harvester proudly embraces the fact that it's one of the most preachy, nihilistic games that you'll ever come across and that it pushes an extremely heavy-handed narrative that acts as if this game has the ability to change the future of gaming and singlehandedly 'solve the problem' of video game violence. [...] However, it's this weird mash-up of tones, sensibilities, and the game's reception that result in it turning into such an interesting, controversial title that's still in discussion today."

The game has been compared to the works of filmmaker David Lynch, including the film Blue Velvet and the television series Twin Peaks.
