= Hearts of Iron II =

2005 video game

- Developer: Paradox Development Studio
- Publishers: WW: Paradox Interactive; SWE: PAN Vision AB
- Designers: Joakim Bergqwist; Henrik Fåhraeus; Johan Andersson
- Programmers: Johan Andersson; Henrik Fåhraeus
- Artist: Marcus Edström
- Composer: Andreas Waldetoft
- Series: Hearts of Iron
- Engine: Europa Engine
- Platforms: Microsoft Windows, Mac OS X
- Release: NA: 4 January 2005; SWE: 13 January 2005; AU: 18 February 2005; EU: 4 March 2005; Mac OS X 7 November 2005
- Genres: Grand strategy
- Modes: Single-player, multiplayer

Hearts of Iron II is a 2005 grand strategy video game developed by Paradox Development Studio and published by Paradox Interactive for Microsoft Windows. A Mac OS X version was released the same year. It is the sequel to Hearts of Iron.

It takes place in the time period from 1 January 1936 (1933 with an expansion) through 30 December 1947 (1964 with an expansion), and allows the player to assume control of any one of over 175 nations of the time and guide its development through the years before, during and after the Second World War. It was developed by Paradox Interactive and released in 2005. The lead game programmer was Johan Andersson.

A sequel, Hearts of Iron III, was released in August 2009.

Arsenal of Democracy, a grand strategy wargame based on Hearts of Iron II, was released in February 2010. Iron Cross, a Hearts of Iron II expansion, was released on October 7, 2010, and Darkest Hour, a stand-alone strategy game based on Hearts of Iron II, was released on April 5, 2011.

== Gameplay ==
Hearts of Iron II is a grand strategy game. The player can build land divisions, aircraft squadrons, and naval ships/fleets, and combine these into corps and armies. The player also has the ability to control the appointment of commanders of forces under their nation's flag or that of controlled nations as well as to control the appointment of individual government ministers and military commanders in key General Staff positions. The player also has a broader ability to control the heads of state and government; however, this option is only available to democracies and only then through elections, in which the player chooses the winner. Technological research is controlled by the player. All this is on a global scale, with the player simultaneously dealing and interacting with nations across the world. The game can be paused at any point.

=== Playable nations ===
The player can choose to play almost any nation from the time period, apart from some very small states such as Andorra, Monaco, Vatican City or others (and mods exist that make even these playable). The player can also play as a new nation that gains its independence as the game progresses, but should wait until the nation actually declares independence in the game before it can be played. However, many smaller nations do not have strong tech teams, nor do they possess a strong industrial base.

=== Politics ===
The player is able to manage their nation's foreign and internal policies on the Diplomacy page. The player can declare war, annex territories and make alliances. The player can also alter the social and economic policies of their nation using sliders, such as democratic versus authoritarian, free market versus central planning and so on. Moving the sliders will result in different bonuses and penalties, allowing for a range of choices and strategies.

On the same page, the player can appoint leaders and ministers, with some exceptions. The Head of State and Head of Government can only be changed through moving the political left vs. political right slider, or through elections and other one-time events.

=== Resource management ===
Hearts of Iron II features nine resources, of which six are conventional resources, and the other three are manpower, industrial capacity and transport capacity:

- Energy, rare materials (e.g. rubber), and metal are produced by individual provinces and pooled together to power the nation's industry.
- Supplies are consumed by a player's armed forces.
- Oil is consumed by mechanized or armored units, air units and naval units. (and some infantry with attached units)
- Money is raised through the production of consumer goods. The amount gained also varies based on government type and policy settings. Money is needed to carry out diplomatic actions, as well as pay research teams.
- Manpower is needed to recruit and reinforce all of a player's armed forces. One unit of Manpower generally represents 1,000 men, as a normal infantry division of 10,000 men requires ten Manpower.
- Each factory in a nation contributes one point of industrial capacity (IC). The total number of factories is known as the Base IC. Several factors, such as difficulty, ministerial appointments, technologies, and resources available can modify this number, producing the actual IC. Each actual IC requires two points of energy, one of metal and half a point of rare materials in order to function.
- Transport capacity (TC) is an abstract number that represents the trucks, trains and river barges which are used to supply a player's armed forces with fuel and supply. TC is a direct function of a player's IC; the player has a TC that is 150% his IC. When the TC used exceeds the available amount, movement, supplies and reinforcements are delayed.

The six conventional resources can be traded with other countries, subject to potential disruption by enemy forces if the routes to the other country are occupied. Trade offers can be made to any other country, even ones with poor diplomatic relations, although allied nations are more willing to accept more favorable trade offers. Manpower, IC and TC are not tradeable.

== Scenarios ==
In the game, a player assumes direct control of a nation at the start of a scenario through 1948. The following scenarios are available:

- The Road to War, beginning on New Year's Day, 1936;
- The Gathering Storm, beginning in September 1938, just before the Munich Agreement; added in the v1.2 patch.
- Blitzkrieg, beginning with Hitler's declaration of war upon Poland (the invasion of Poland) on 1 September 1939;
- Awakening the Giant, beginning on 22 June 1941, at the beginning of Operation Barbarossa.
- Götterdämmerung, beginning on 20 June 1944, two weeks after the Western Allies landed at Normandy.

Added in Iron Cross:

- 1933, beginning on 30 January 1933, when Hitler takes power in Germany.
- 1934, beginning on 1 October 1934, at the start of the Asturian miners' strike of 1934.

Playable operations are:

- Fall Gelb, the German invasion of France in 1940.
- Operation Barbarossa, the German invasion of the Soviet Union in Summer of 1941.
- The Ardennes Offensive, centered around the Battle of the Bulge, on the Franco-Belgian-German frontier the winter of 1944, which was also playable in the game's demo.
- Southern Conquests, revolving around the Japanese centrifugal offensive into the southern resource area in South-East Asia, following the attack on Pearl Harbor.
- Operation Watchtower, the battle for Guadalcanal in the Solomon Islands.
- Fall Weiss, the German invasion of Poland
- Fall Grün, the planned German attack on Czechoslovakia
- Platinean War, a fantasy scenario where German-backed Argentina and American-backed Brazil clash in a conflict that would involve most of South America.
- Winter War, the Soviet-Finnish War of 1939–1940.
- Desert Fox, the African campaign that culminated in the Battle of El Alamein.
- Operation Husky, the Allied landings in Sicily and the subsequent Italian Campaign.
- Operation Overlord, the Allied landings in Normandy.
- Operation Downfall, the planned Allied invasion of the Japanese Home Islands.
- Spanish Civil War, the conflict between the Spanish republicans and nationalists in 1936–1939.
- Battle of the Coral Sea, the Japanese plan to capture Port Moresby on New Guinea by sea and the following carrier battle.
- Fall Blau, the German 1942 summer offensive against the Soviet Union, eventually culminating in the Battle of Stalingrad; added in the v1.2 patch.

== Warfare ==
Hearts of Iron II is a grand strategy game. The smallest independent land unit is the division, although brigades such as engineers, artillery, or armoured cars can be attached to these. On sea, units are either single capital ships or flotillas of small ships such as destroyers. For the air force, the unit is a Wing or Group, depending on nationality. Land divisions include infantry, cavalry, and tanks. Land brigades include anti-tank guns, anti-aircraft artillery and military police.

On the map the player can direct divisions or groups of divisions. Fighting starts when an army starts moving into a defended enemy territory. The invading units do not have to be inside enemy territory to attack. A province is immediately occupied when the invaders arrive there with no opposition left. Because of this, a player can blitz through large swaths of enemy lands with minimal micromanagement. In addition, units who move constantly lose organization and risk losing supply, so poorly executed attempts to blitzkrieg can be stopped. Provinces can be fortified and infrastructure increased to improve combat performance. Structures include radar, and static AA. Many fortifications are pre-built, such as the Maginot Line along the French-German border.

Air units include bombers, fighters and transports. These divisions can, depending on type, engage in tactical or strategic missions. Sea units include transports, aircraft carriers, battleships, cruisers, destroyers, and submarines. Each unit has a strength, speed, and effective engagement range. Naval combats simulate the range between fleets, allowing only units in range to fire. This can make naval combats tactically complex.

== Controversy and censorship ==
Like its predecessor Hearts of Iron, the game is banned in the People's Republic of China. The main point of contention seems to be that the game portrays the various Chinese warlords as independent entities, while according to the PRC government they were nominally part of the Republic of China governed by the Chinese Nationalist government, represented in-game as 'Nationalist China'. Also, the Tibetan flag used in-game is banned in China. Paradox has stated that it will not reduce the level of historical accuracy in order to appease the PRC censors.

Anachronistically, Germany is represented with the flag of the German Empire as used by Germany until 1935, and not the Swastika flag, as was also done in the earlier board game Axis & Allies. Laws in Germany prohibit the use of the swastika. Additionally, in the German version of the game, pictures of leading Nazi leaders, such as Hitler, Göring, and Himmler were removed and their names subsequently altered, though this is not required under German censorship laws, and is not the case in non-German versions of the game. The game can be easily modified by users to include such graphics, but Paradox disallows discussion of this particular type of modification on their message boards.

== Expansions ==
=== Doomsday ===
A stand-alone expansion pack to the game, Hearts of Iron II: Doomsday, was released on April 4, 2006. It contains everything that was in the original game while highlighting and expanding the period after historical World War II, including a hypothetical nuclear war between the Soviet Union and the Allies. The expansion pack features among other things a reworked intelligence model (which allows the player to use espionage, sabotage and other things in an "intelligence page" accessible through the main screen), improved AI and a scenario editor.

Doomsday also features some other changes and additions such as:

- Additional graphics such as bomber sprites
- Escort Carriers
- Hospitals that recover manpower losses
- A "do not upgrade" button for divisions
- The option of automating the production sliders
- Submarines have separate stats for convoy raiding and naval combat
- An extended timeframe — the game end date has been changed to 1953
- New technologies to bring the game into the cold war era
- An included scenario editor
- The ability to trade divisions between nations
- The ability to attach escorts while recruiting divisions

=== Armageddon ===
Another expansion was released in April 2007 in an alternate history scenario called Hearts of Iron II: Armageddon. It further allows more time and the player has the ability to choose 1964 as the end point. It allows the adding of modules to ships (such as improved radar, fire-control, anti-submarine or anti-aircraft weaponry) and submits two new scenarios for play, as well as an enhanced AI.

Armageddon also features some other changes and additions such as:

- Player can allow or disallow democracies to declare war on the main menu options screen
- Player may choose when the time of play will end, ranging as early as 1940 to as late as 1964
- Player may choose to get the full industrial capacity of an annexed country, or not
- Player may choose to use tech teams of an annexed country or not
- New brigade attachments for ships
- Diplomatic option to refuse expeditionary forces from player's allies

=== Iron Cross ===
Iron Cross is an expansion of Hearts of Iron II: Armageddon released as a digital download on October 7, 2010, developed by Irshappa. It expands the number of provinces on the map as well as numerous other additions and can also be installed as a compatible expansion of Arsenal of Democracy and Darkest Hour.

Iron Cross also features some other changes and additions such as:

- Playing as one of 200 countries from 1933 to 1964, and interacting with real ministers and leaders
- New map with over 4,000 new provinces
- More than 6,000 new events
- New tech tree featuring 800 technologies, with a realistic research system
- New units and brigades, including special units, infantry regiment, heavy artillery, and more
- New AI offering more options and greater depth
- New scenarios set in 1933 and 1934 as well as old scenarios adapted to Iron Cross

== Reception ==
Hearts of Iron II

Aggregate score
Aggregator	Score
Metacritic	83/100

Review scores
Publication	Score
Computer Gaming World	2.5/5
IGN	8.7/10
GameSpot	8.3/10
Computer Games Magazine	3.5/5

Hearts of Iron II was commercially successful for Paradox; Hanza Aziz of Destructoid called it the company's "first major hit". In the United States alone, it sold 80,000 copies on a marketing budget of $75,000.

On Metacritic the following reception was achieved by Paradox Development Studio:

- Hearts of Iron II: 83/100 from the professional critics and 8.6/10 from the users.
- Doomsday: 80/100 from the professional critics and 8.8/10 from the users.

GameSpot gave it 8.3/10, writing that "this is what the original game should have been". At IGN, it received a score of 8.7/10.

Hearts of Iron II was a finalist for PC Gamer US's "Best Real-Time Strategy Game 2005" award, which ultimately went to Age of Empires III. It was also nominated for the 2004 Charles S. Roberts Award for "Best 20th Century Era Computer Wargame", but lost to Battles in Normandy.

== See also ==
- List of grand strategy video games
- List of Paradox Interactive games
- List of World War II video games
