= Hugo II, Whodunit? =

1991 video game

- Developer: Gray Design Associates
- Publisher: Gray Design Associates
- Designer: David P. Gray
- Platforms: MS-DOS, Windows
- Release: NA: 1991
- Genre: Adventure
- Mode: Single-player

Hugo II, Whodunit? (named Hugo's Mystery Adventure in the Hugo Trilogy re-release) is a text parser-based adventure game designed by independent software developer David P. Gray and published for MS-DOS as shareware by Gray Design Associates in 1991. It is the sequel to 1990's Hugo's House of Horrors, and was followed by Hugo III, Jungle of Doom! in 1992.

== Plot ==
Following the events of Hugo's House of Horrors, Hugo and Penelope visit Hugo's Great Uncle Horace at his mansion in England. They arrive in their guest room, and Penelope decides to take a nap. While she sleeps, Hugo discovers a secret passage behind a bookcase and disappears. When Penelope wakes up, she hears arguing and looks through a keyhole to see Great Uncle Horace being stabbed to death. She passes out from fright, and after regaining consciousness, she discovers the secret passage.

Penelope explores the house and the garden outside, avoiding deadly killer bees and Venus flytraps, navigating a maze, and crossing a bridge over a stream. She meets the old man from Hugo's House of Horrors, but having no time for trivia questions, she strikes him across the head. Penelope also finds a phone booth, and after dialing a number she is transported to another planet with a pastiche of The Doctor and a Dalek from Doctor Who. Penelope eventually returns to the mansion and goes down a well to find a cavern before returning to explore another wing of the mansion. At 6PM, the detective arrives but cannot determine who the killer is. It is then revealed that Great Uncle Horace had been rehearsing a play.

== Gameplay ==
Whodunit retains its gameplay from Hugo's House of Horrors. The player controls Hugo and Penelope with the arrow keys on the keyboard and enters commands into the text parser to interact with the environment. The characters can be instructed to look at and describe their surroundings, pick up objects, and use the things around them. The game also provides a save/load function and a boss key to hide the program. In the Hugo Trilogy release, the text parser is supplemented by a point and click interface. Unlike its predecessor, Penelope is the main player character for most of Whodunit, with Hugo only being playable during the first and last moments of the game. Whodunit is also longer than Hugo's House of Horrors with more areas to explore and more puzzles to solve.

== Development ==
Whodunit was developed as a sequel to Hugo's House of Horrors, which was primarily based on Leisure Suit Larry in the Land of the Lounge Lizards. The original DOS game was written in Microsoft Quick C, and the port to Windows was written in Visual C++. Gray cited his love of Agatha Christie murder mysteries as a major inspiration of the game's theme, and he said that his choice to give the game a female protagonist was intentional. He also describes the game as an example of the second-system effect.

== Reception ==
Richard Cobbett of PC Gamer expressed that while other Hugo games are short and "not of much interest", Whodunit is "endearingly crazy". He praised the improvement in art design from the game's predecessor, but he criticized the unintuitive gameplay and the poor design of the puzzles. Andrew Morin of Adventure Classic Gaming praises the game's improvements in its design and its increased scope compared to its predecessor as well as its humor.
