= DigiFX Interactive =

American video game developer, 1991–1997

- Industry: Video games
- Founded: November, 1991 (as Future Vision, Inc.)
- Defunct: October 27, 1997
- Headquarters: Dallas, Texas, United States
- Website: digifx.net (Archived)

DigiFX Interactive was an American video game developer with headquarters in Dallas, Texas. It was founded in November 1991 and went out of business in October 1997 after its publisher, Merit Studios, was dissolved. During its lifetime, it developed and released Command Adventures: Starship and The Fortress of Dr. Radiaki under the name of Future Vision, Inc. It also released Harvester under the name of DigiFX Interactive. Due to the company's dissolution, several games in development were cancelled, including strategy game Mission to Nexus Prime written by Timothy Zahn.
