= Ronnie Apteker =

South African internet pioneer

- Born: 19 August 1967 (age 59); Cape Town, South Africa
- Citizenship: South African
- Education: University of the Witwatersrand
- Notable work: Material

Ronnie Apteker (born 19 August 1967) is a South African internet pioneer, writer, and film producer.

== Early life ==
Ronnie Apteker was born in Cape Town, South Africa, and attended high school before enrolling at the University of the Witwatersrand, where he graduated cum laude with an M.Sc. in computer science.

== Business career ==
In 1993, Apteker co-founded Internet Solutions, South Africa's first Internet service Provider (ISP), which quickly evolved into a successful post-apartheid business, winning numerous technology awards. Apteker has written a number of papers, published both locally and internationally. In February 1994, he presented a paper on Distributed Multimedia to the International Society for Optical Engineering in San Jose, California. This paper was subsequently published in the SPIE/IEEE Proceedings.

In 2002, Apteker sponsored and produced the Laugh Out Loud fundraiser, South Africa's largest stand-up comedy TV show. It raised half a million Rand for the Reach for a Dream foundation.

Apteker is a partner in the video games company Room 8 Studio, which developed games such as Piano City and Cyto's Puzzle Adventure.

Apteker became an advisor at 10Guards in Kyiv, in December 2018.

Apteker has some IT investments and is currently involved with Dragon Studios.

As a recognized business leader and speaker he has appeared at the Discovery Leadership alongside others such as Sir Richard Branson, Tony Blair and Al Gore

== Books ==
- Ronnie Apteker's Funny Business: the Secrets of an Accidental Entrepreneur, Zebra Press, 2010
- Do You Love IT in the Morning?, Apteker, Ronnie & Ord, Jeremy, Media Africa & the Publishing Partnership, 1999
- Trading Spaces: Exploring Internet Solutions, Apteker, Ronnie, Intelligence Publishing, 1996

== Film production ==
Since 2000, Apteker has been one of the leading independent film producers in South Africa. His films include Material, Tell Me Sweet Something and Cold Harbour. Etc. etc. Despite critical and popular acclaim within South Africa, some of the films have failed to find wider international acclaim. Apteker's involvement in the South African comedy club scene has led to several comedians appearing in his films, most notably Riaad Moosa, Joey Rasdien and Vincent Ebrahim from the BBC's The Kumars at No. 42 who appeared in the film Material.

- 2025 Kyiv of Mine (producer)
- 2022 57 (producer)
- 2020 Courting Anathi (executive producer)
- 2020 Material II (producer)
- 2019 Matwetwe (executive producer)
- 2018 Feedom (executive producer)
- 2017 Catching Feelings (executive producer)
- 2016 Vaya (producer)
- 2016 Beyond The River (producer)
- 2015 Tell Me Sweet Something (producer)
- 2015 Tiger House (producer)
- 2013 Cold Harbour (producer)
- 2013 Nothing for Mahala (executive producer)
- 2012 Sleeper's Wake (executive producer)
- 2012 Material (producer)
- 2008 Reeker 2 (executive producer)
- 2008 Gangster's Paradise: Jerusalema (executive producer)
- 2007 Footskating 101 (producer)
- 2005 Out on a Limb (executive producer)
- 2005 Crazy Monkey presents...Straight Outta Benoni (producer)
- 2005 The Flyer (executive producer)
- 2005 Reeker (executive producer)
- 2003 Laugh Out Loud (TV Movie) (executive producer)
- 2002 Purpose (producer - as Ronen Apteker)
