= Room 8 Group =

Video game development company

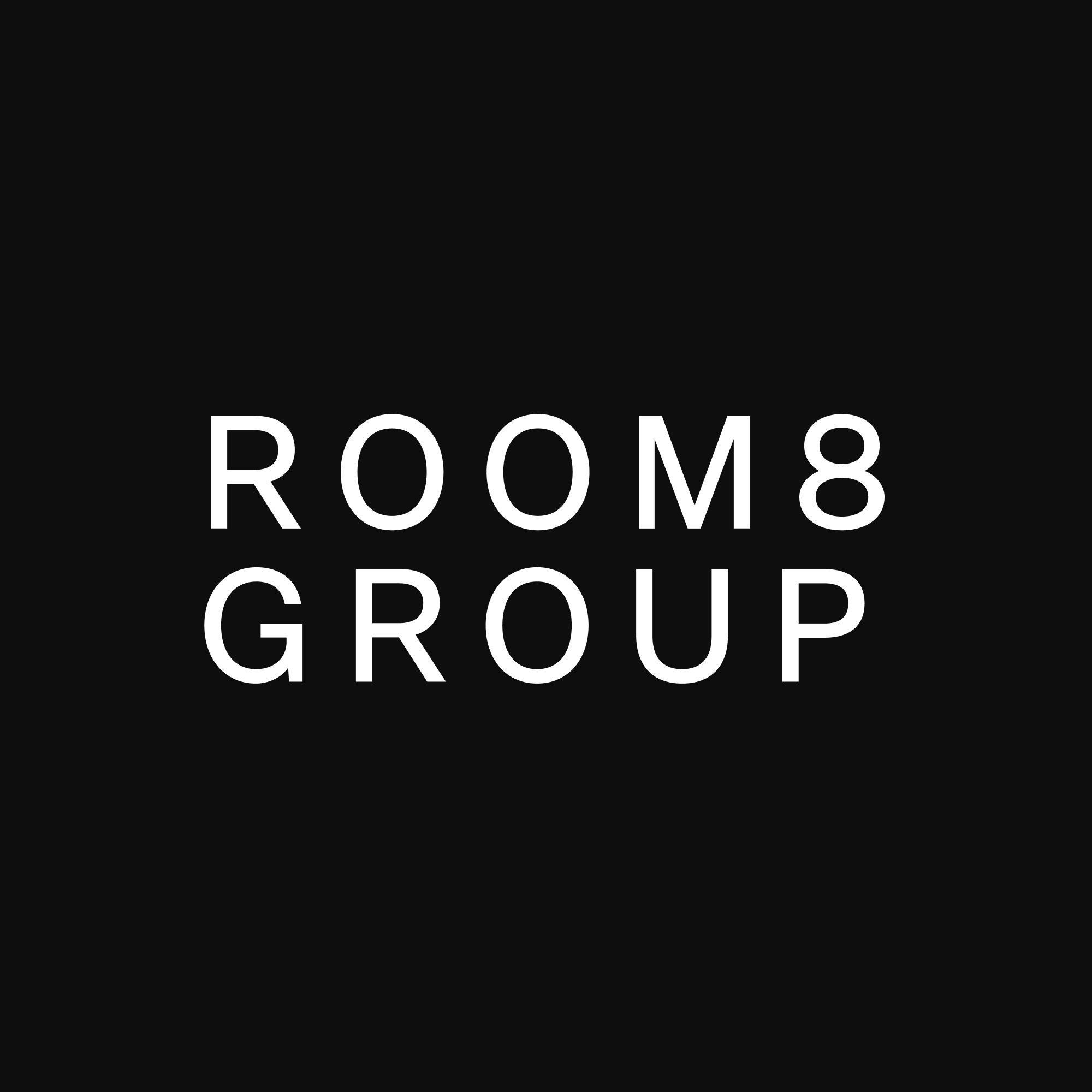
- Type: Private
- Industry: Video game development
- Founded: 2011; 15 years ago in Kyiv, Ukraine
- Founder: Sviatoslav Pohrebnoi
- Key people: Sviatoslav Pohrebnoi (founder, board member), Anna Kozlova (CEO until April 2026)
- Services: Game development, art production
- Number of employees: 1,100+ (2025)
- Website: www.room8group.com

Room 8 Group is an international video game development company that provides co-development, art, trailers, and quality assurance (QA) services. The company has collaborated with major publishers such as Microsoft, Nintendo, Ubisoft, Sony, Gameloft, Take-Two Interactive, Electronic Arts, and others. Room 8 Group co-created projects for video game IPs and franchises including Call of Duty, Diablo, Assassin's Creed, Star Trek, The Walking Dead, Doctor Who, and more.

== History ==
The company was founded in 2011 in Kyiv, Ukraine, by Sviatoslav Pohrebnoi. Initially operating as a development studio, it released its first co-developed titles and grew to a team of 30 employees. In 2013, Room 8 Studio was established, and the company released Cyto's Puzzle Adventure, which was listed among the Best New Games on the App Store in 68 countries.

In 2014, the company worked on projects such as Cookie Jam, World of Tanks, Piano City, and Mahjong Journey. In 2016, it expanded into porting and video production, obtained certification from PlayStation, Xbox, and Nintendo Switch, and worked on games based on franchises such as Family Guy, Power Rangers, Kubo, and Independence Day.

In 2018 the company began its global expansion, uniting multiple studios and broadening its focus, becoming Room 8 Group. It then established the co-development studio Dragons Lake. That year the company co-developed various AAA projects, contributing to titles such as Indivisible for 505 Games, Call of Duty: Cold War, and Fall Guys.

Between 2020 and 2021, the company launched an Art Direction & Visual Development division and opened a hub in Montreal, Canada. It also worked on BBC Studios' Doctor Who and Remedy Entertainment's project, Control. In 2022, Room 8 Group began providing IP Game Development services and acquired a US-based studio, Massive Black. It also launched a QA division and opened a production hub in Poland. The company acquired Brazil-based creative studio PUGA Studios and grew to over 1,000 employees.

In 2023, Room 8 Group established Heroic, a trailers and cinematics studio. That year the company worked on projects such as Alan Wake 2, Dead Space, Diablo IV, Forza Motorsport, Star Wars Jedi: Survivor, Hello Kitty Island Adventure, Apex Legends, Mario + Rabbids: Sparks of Hope, Call of Duty: Modern Warfare II, Metal: Hellsinger, and The Quarry, and was shortlisted in the Creative/Co-Development Partner of the Year category at the MCV/Develop Awards.

In 2024, the company finalized the integration of Massive Black and PUGA Studios. It joined industry organizations TIGA and UKIE, and was shortlisted for several awards at the MCV/Develop Awards, TIGA Awards, and Develop: Star Awards. It won the Best Service Provider award at the Mobile Games Awards and the Commitment to ESG award at the TIGA Awards. In 2024, Room 8 Group worked on over 320 projects, including Call of Duty: Black Ops 6, Indiana Jones and the Great Circle, Call of Duty: Warzone Mobile, Microsoft Flight Simulator 2024, Prince of Persia: The Lost Crown, Crusader Kings III.

In February 2025, Room 8 Group consolidated its Dragons Lake and Solid Bash brands under the Room 8 Group name and restructured its services into two offerings, Game Development and Technology solutions.

Room 8 Studio, the group's art solution, provided art and animation services on Compulsion Games' South of Midnight, released in 2025.

Room 8 Group developed console versions of downloadable content for Crusader Kings III in partnership with Paradox Interactive, including the Wards & Wardens event pack in March 2025 and the Roads to Power expansion and Wandering Nobles event pack, released for Xbox Series X/S and PlayStation 5 in May 2026.

Room 8 Group was shortlisted in two categories at the 2025 MCV/Develop Awards, Creative (Content) Partner of the Year and the Global Business Excellence Award, and in five categories at the 2025 TIGA Games Industry Awards: Co-Development Partner, Technical Innovation, Art/Animation/Trailer Supplier, Commitment to ESG, and Commitment to Workplace Wellbeing.

In 2026, the company was once again shortlisted for the MCV/Develop Awards in the Co-Development Studio of the Year and Service Partner of the Year categories, as well as in three categories at the 2026 TIGA Games Industry Awards: Co-Development Partner, Art/Animation/Trailer Supplier, and Services Provider.

== Activities ==
The company worked with partners across 30 countries, including the United States, Canada, the United Kingdom, Sweden, South Korea, and Brazil. Partnerships include Activision, Quantic Dream, Machine Games, Krafton EU, Paradox Interactive, Blizzard Entertainment, Compulsion Games, Ubisoft, Electronic Arts, Nintendo, Gameloft, Xbox Game Studios, Unity, Intel, Sony, SEGA, Amazon Games, and Riot Games.

It worked in partnership to provide co-development and technology services on titles like Redline Royale, Dead by Daylight, Life is Strange, Godfall, Bulletstorm, Angry Birds, Outriders, Lords of the Fallen, and more.

Room 8 Group's art division worked on franchises such as Call of Duty, Overwatch, Diablo, and more. Room 8 Group has been recognized for its contributions to game art and animation, being shortlisted for industry awards such as the TIGA Awards and Develop: Star Awards.

== Public activities ==
=== Humanitarian aid in Ukraine ===
Since 2020 Room 8 Group has supported various humanitarian relief efforts in Ukraine. In 2023, Room 8 Group provided financial assistance for humanitarian efforts in Ukraine following the destruction of the Kakhovka Dam. The company donated $50,000 to the charity funds Rescue Now and UAnimals to support relief operations in the Kherson region. Rescue Now facilitated evacuations, provided accommodation, and delivered humanitarian aid, including the installation of two water purification stations in the Dnipropetrovsk region, supplying clean drinking water to over 15,000 people. UAnimals focused on rescuing and caring for animals affected by the floods, using the funds to purchase a dedicated evacuation truck to transport displaced animals to safe locations across Ukraine. In 2024, Room 8 Group contributed $12,000 (500,000 UAH) to aid in the reconstruction of Okhmatdyt Children's Hospital in Kyiv after it was severely damaged by a missile strike. The company's specialists also took part in the rebuilding initiative.
