= Purpose (film) =

- Directed by: Alan Lazar
- Written by: Ronnie Apteker; Alan Lazar; Saki Missaikos; Thomas W. Roush
- Produced by: Michael S. Murphy; Alan Lazar; Ronnie Apteker
- Starring: John Light; Jeffrey Donovan; Megan Dodds; Peter Coyote; Hal Holbrook; Paul Reiser; Mia Farrow
- Cinematography: John Peters
- Edited by: Lawrence A. Maddox
- Music by: Alan Lazar
- Production companies: Lakeshore Entertainment; Earth Magic Pictures
- Distributed by: First Look Studios
- Release date: June 12, 2002
- Running time: 96 minutes
- Country: United States
- Language: English

Purpose is a 2002 American independent drama thriller film starring John Light, Jeffrey Donovan, Megan Dodds, Peter Coyote, Hal Holbrook, Paul Reiser and Mia Farrow. It is directed, co-produced, co-written and scored by Alan Lazar and co-produced and co-written by Ronnie Apteker, whose original concept the film is based on.

== Plot ==
In San Francisco, college dropout John Elias (John Light) is determined to set up his own internet business named Digital Dreams, based on his vision of building a better and faster communication for mankind. He hires a deal closer named Robert Jennings (Jeffrey Donovan) as his Executive VP and after successfully receiving the finance, John and Robert start to launch and run the company together. But once he makes his first million, John is soon distracted by greed, fame and fortune whilst his company starts to become at risk of a hostile takeover.

== Cast ==
- John Light as John Elias, CEO of Digital Dreams
- Jeffrey Donovan as Robert Jennings, Executive VP of Digital Dreams
- Megan Dodds as Lisa Forrester, John's girlfriend and songwriter
- Peter Coyote as Bernard Elias, John's father
- Hal Holbrook as Tom Walker, business investor
- Concetta Tomei as Lily Elias, John's mother
- Shaun Majumder and Archie Kao as Victor and Kiko, John's college friends
- Paul Reiser as Ben Fisher, John's college professor
- Mia Farrow as Anna Simmons, business woman

== Production ==
Production on Purpose went into post production in 2001 and was filmed in San Francisco, Los Angeles, and Mexico. The film's original screenplay was written by Ronnie Apteker, who based the premise on his own experiences within the internet business world. One of his goals while writing the screenplay was to make the technology in the film more realistic than those portrayed in Disclosure and The Net.

== Reception ==
The Mail and Guardian reviewed the film, praising Purpose's performances.
