= Vinette Ebrahim =

South African actress and playwright (born 1957)

Ebrahim Khan
- Born: 21 February 1957 (age 69)
- Occupation: Actress
- Known for: Actress, playwright
- Relatives: Vincent Ebrahim
- Awards: 2013, Naledi Theatre Award for Best Performance in a Play in a Leading Role (Female)

Vinette Ebrahim (born 21 February 1957) is a South African actress and playwright known for her role as Charmaine Meintjies in the SABC 2 soap opera 7de Laan. She is the sister of actor Vincent Ebrahim.

== Early life ==
Ebrahim is the sister of South African-British actor Vincent Ebrahim. Her brother, eight years her senior, named Ebrahim after himself.

Ebrahim's father worked as a teacher in Woodstock, a suburb of Cape Town, South Africa, as well as an actor, writer, and director. In the late 1950s, he moved the family to Coventry, England, to work as a stage manager. The family later returned to South Africa.

== Career ==
Ebrahim has stated that she learned acting "on the hoof" in Cape Town, working as a stagehand, actor, and other jobs in the theatre.

Ebrahim has played the central role of Charmaine Beukes Meintjies on the South African television soap opera 7de Laan since 2000.

Ebrahim has performed in theatres and at theatre festivals throughout South Africa, including Suidoosterfees and the Klein Karoo Nasionale Kunstefees. At the Klein Karoo festival in 2007, she performed in an Afrikaans-language production of Athol Fugard's play, Boesman en Lena. She received the Kanna Award for Best Actress for her role as Lena.

At the 2013 Naledi Theatre Awards, Ebrahim won the award for Best Performance in a Play in a Leading Role (Female) for My Naam/Name is Ellen Pakkies. The play tells the real-life story of a South African woman convicted of killing her drug-addicted son after enduring years of abuse.

Ebrahim has also written plays, including Die Ongelooflike Reis van Max en Lola, a two-character work she co-wrote with South African playwright and director Hugo Taljaard. Ebrahim based the play in part on her long-time friendship with South African actor Chris van Niekerk. In the play and in real life, the friendship between a gay white man and a Coloured woman persisted, even through the Apartheid era. Ebrahim has said that during the Apartheid era, Van Niekerk would attend one cinema, while she attended another, and "then we'd come together and act stukkies (scenes) out".

At the Klein Karoo festival in 2016, she performed in Invisible, another play she authored in English and Afrikaans.

In Invisible, she portrayed a homeless woman who once was a resident of Cape Town's District Six.

Ebrahim has also created a one-woman show about her life, Praat Die Storie Smaak Kry (Let's Spice It Up), which she has performed in Afrikaans and English throughout South Africa as part of National Women's Day celebrations.

In July 2019, it was announced that Ebrahim would exit her dual roles of Charmaine and her evil twin sister Vivian because "all potential stories around Charmaine and Vivian have been exhausted". Ebrahim ended her 19-year run on the show on 24 October 2019.

In an interview published in the South African magazine Kuier, Ebrahim stated that she had been forced to leave 7de Laan. She said that she had anticipated her exit for some time, and she disputed the claim that there were no more storylines for her character Charmaine.

On 7 November 2019, Ebrahim began a six-week guest appearance role on rival South African soap, Binnelanders.

== Awards ==
Ebrahim has been nominated for and received several awards for her professional work.

- In 2007, Ebrahim won the Kanna Award for Best Actress for her performance in Boesman en Lena at the Klein Karoo arts festival.
- In 2008, Ebrahim received the Rapport/City Press Prestige Award for her contributions to the arts.
- In 2013, Ebrahim won the Naledi Theatre Award for Best Performance in a Play in a Leading Role (Female) for My Naam/Name is Ellen Pakkies.

== Controversy ==
In January 2015, Ebrahim faced criticism on social media after commenting on a Facebook post by Sunette Bridges, in which Bridges alleged the number of white farmers murdered committed in 2014 . Bridges also claimed that these attacks/murders were mostly perpetrated by "blacks". Ebrahim commented that, in her view, coloured, Indian, and black South Africans experienced higher levels of violent crime on average (with the murder of white farmers or a member of their family's only accounting for 0,3% of all murders recorded in South Africa that year) in the year 2014, which is only a claim and not a proven fact. Ebrahim also brought to light the racist dogmas upon which the Afrikaner identity is built and the unwillingness of Afrikaners to meaningfully atone for the damage they have dealt to South Africa and its people. This prompted significant backlash on social media. While other Afrikaner's chose to leverage the advantages granted to them by structural racism by attempting to boycott 7de Laan .
