= Crusader Kings III: Royal Court =

2022 video game DLC

- Developer: Paradox Development Studio
- Publisher: Paradox Interactive
- Engine: Clausewitz Engine
- Platforms: Windows, MacOS
- Release: 8 February 2022
- Genre: Grand strategy wargame
- Mode: Player versus player; single-player

Crusader Kings III: Royal Court is the first major expansion for the grand strategy video game, Crusader Kings III developed by the Paradox Development Studio and is published by the company Paradox Interactive. It is considered to be a part of "Chapter 1" which is how Crusader Kings 3 splits its yearly content, and is the second overall downloadable content following the Northern Lords flavor pack. Royal Court reworks the court system in the game, adding a three-dimensional (3D) throne room and court artifacts to the game, as well as changes to the culture system.

== Gameplay ==
Royal Court's adds new mechanics such as a 3D throne room along with a new Court Artifacts feature allowing the player to decorate their throne room with numerous artifacts from their rule. It also allows the player to hold court meetings where vassals and courtiers will come to the player with certain problems. Royal Court adds a feature called "Court Grandeur" which allows the player to improve conditions at their court to attract higher quality court guests which can be recruited. Artifact inspiration is where players can sponsor the creation of artifacts for the players throne room. This can be anything from a crown to a banner. Additionally, Royal Court reworks cultures; the new system allows players to create their own culture by diverging away from a preexisting one. Doing so gives the player all the previous cultures innovations under a new cultural banner. Players can also form hybrid cultures which is the fusion of two cultures innovations. Players can edit cultural traditions.

== Development ==
Crusader Kings III: Royal Court was announced on 21 March in 2021. Marketing seemed to have an equal focus on the court features as well as the cultures as can be seen from announcements. Before release, Paradox released a series of Dev Diaries which let players look into the development of the DLC.

== Reception ==
The DLC achieved generally favourable reviews according to Metacritic with a score of 83. IGN gave it a score of 9/10 saying that it was "the best kind of strategy expansion". PC Gamer stated that it made a great RPG even better. Royal Court sold at least 1 million copies in terms of metrics.
