= Material (film) =

- film poster
- Directed by: Craig Freimond
- Written by: Craig Freimond; Ronnie Apteker; Robbie Thorpe; Rosalind Butler; Riaad Moosa
- Screenplay by: Craig Freimond
- Story by: Craig Freimond; Ronnie Apteker; Rosalind Butler; Ronnie Thorpe; Riaad Moosa
- Produced by: Ronnie Apteker; Ronnie Thorpe
- Starring: Riaad Moosa; Vincent Ebrahim; Yusuf Rasdien; Krijay Govender; Zakeeva Patel; Carishma Basday; Royston Stoffels; Quanita Adams; Afzal Khan; Mel Miller; Nik Rabinowitz
- Cinematography: Trevor Claverley
- Edited by: Megan Gill
- Music by: Lizzie Rennie
- Release date: 10 January 2012 (South Africa)
- Running time: 94 minutes
- Country: South Africa
- Language: English

Material is a 2012 South African film, directed by Craig Freimond and written by Craig Freimond, Ronnie Apteker, Robbie Thorpe, Rosalind Butler and Riaad Moosa. After playing at Film Africa 2012, it has been shown at numerous film festivals around the world (London, International Film Festival of India, Busan) and gained a reputation as one of the best original South African films and a significant leap forward for the country's film industry. Its portrayal of the lives of Muslims in South Africa was seen as an honest attempt to tackle some of the social issues facing the country's multiracial society.

== Plot ==
Set in the Muslim Indian enclave of Fordsburg, Johannesburg. Material revolves around the tempestuous relationship between Cassim Kaif and his aging father whose one dream is for his son to take over the family's fabric shop, which is struggling to stay afloat. However, Cassim wants to be a stand-up comedian, a notion that his traditionalist father strongly disapproves of. When Cassim lands a gig at a local bar, he has to find a way of keeping it a secret from his family. The film's portrayal of the clash between youth, tradition and religion, alternates between family drama and snippets from the world of stand-up comedy.

== Cast ==
- Riaad Moosa as Cassim Kaif
- Vincent Ebrahim as Ebrahim Kaif
- Joey Yusuf Rasdien as Yusuf
- Denise Newman as Fatima Kaif
- Krijay Govender as Dadi Kaif
- Zakeeya Patel as Aisha Kaif
- Carishma Basday as Zulfa Ahmed
- Royston Stoffels as Rafiq Kaif
- Quanita Adams as Shareen
- Afzal Khan as Faheem
- Mel Miller as Merv
- Nik Rabinowitz as Dave Gold

== Awards ==
- 7th South African Film and Television Awards (2013) - Best Director of a Feature Film (Craig Freimond), Best Actor in a Feature Film (Riaad Moosa), Best Supporting Actor in a Feature Film (Vincent Ebrahim), Best Feature Film, Best Sound Designer of a Feature Film

| Year | Award | Category | Nominee(s) | Result | Ref. |
|---|---|---|---|---|---|
| 2013 | South African Film and Television Awards | Best Supporting Actor - Feature Film | Vincent Ebrahim | Won | |
| 2013 | South African Film and Television Awards | Best Actor - Feature Film | Riaad Moosa | Won | |
| 2013 | South African Film and Television Awards | Best Achievement in Sound Design - Feature Film | Charlotte Buys | Won | |
| 2013 | South African Film and Television Awards | Best Achievement in Cinematography - Feature Film | Trevor Calverley | Nominated | |
| 2013 | South African Film and Television Awards | Best Supporting Actress - Feature Film | Denise Newman | Nominated | |
| 2013 | South African Film and Television Awards | Best Achievement in Script Writing - Feature Film | Craig Freimond | Nominated | |
| 2013 | South African Film and Television Awards | Best Achievement in Editing - Feature Film | | Nominated | |
| 2013 | South African Film and Television Awards | Best Feature Film | Ronnie Apteker goofball | Nominated | |

== Sequel ==
It was titled New Material, alongside arrivals Riaad Moosa, Vincent Ebrahim, Denise Newman and Joey Yusuf Rasdien. It will be released on 1 October 2021.
