= Crusader Kings III =

2020 video game

- Developer: Paradox Development Studio (Note: Console versions developed in partnership with Lab42 Games)
- Publisher: Paradox Interactive
- Directors: Henrik Fåhraeus; Alexander "Rageair" Oltner (Post-release, current)
- Composers: Andreas Waldetoft; Philip Wareborn
- Platforms: Microsoft Windows; macOS; Linux; Xbox Series X/S; PlayStation 5
- Release: Windows, macOS, Linux; WW: 1 September 2020; AU: 7 September 2020; PS5, Xbox Series X/S; WW: 29 March 2022
- Genres: Grand strategy, role-playing
- Modes: Single-player, multiplayer

Crusader Kings III is a grand strategy role-playing video game set in the Middle Ages, developed by Paradox Development Studio and published by Paradox Interactive as a sequel to Crusader Kings (2004) and Crusader Kings II (2012), featuring similar gameplay, centred around historical bloodlines and dynasties. The game was released on PC on 1 September 2020 and on the Xbox Series X/S and PlayStation 5 on 29 March 2022 in most regions. The game received favourable critical attention, and has sold over 4 million copies as of April 2025.

== Gameplay ==
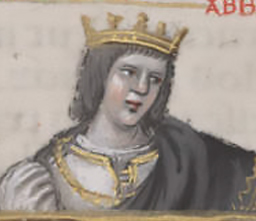
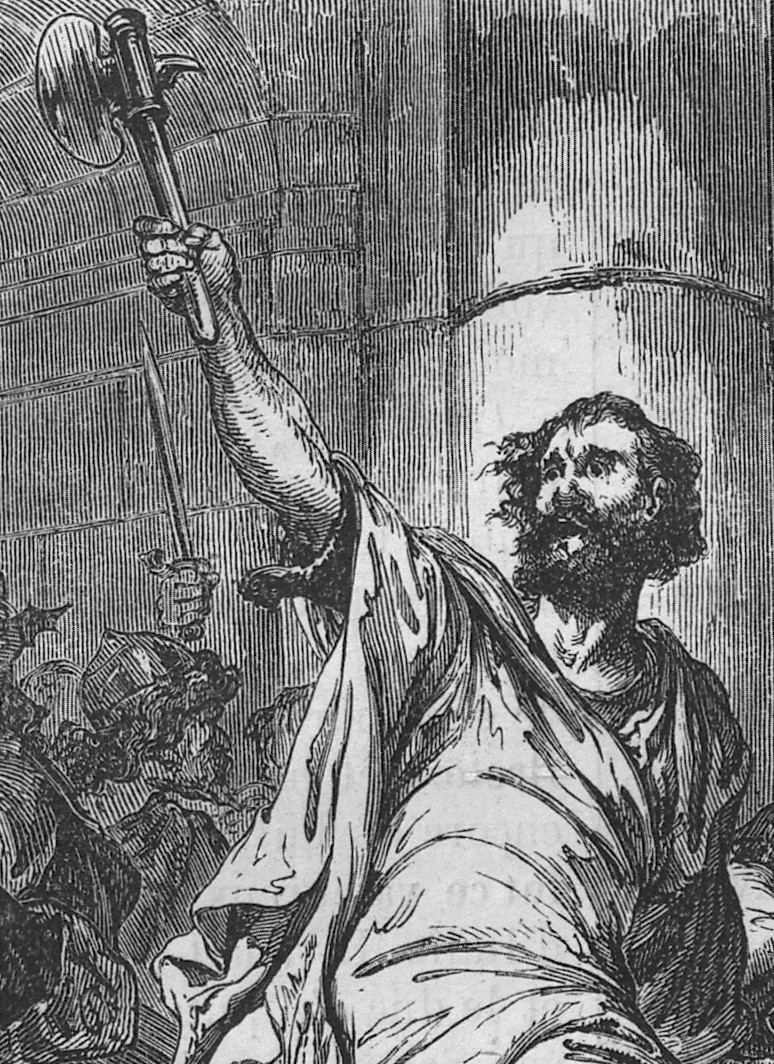
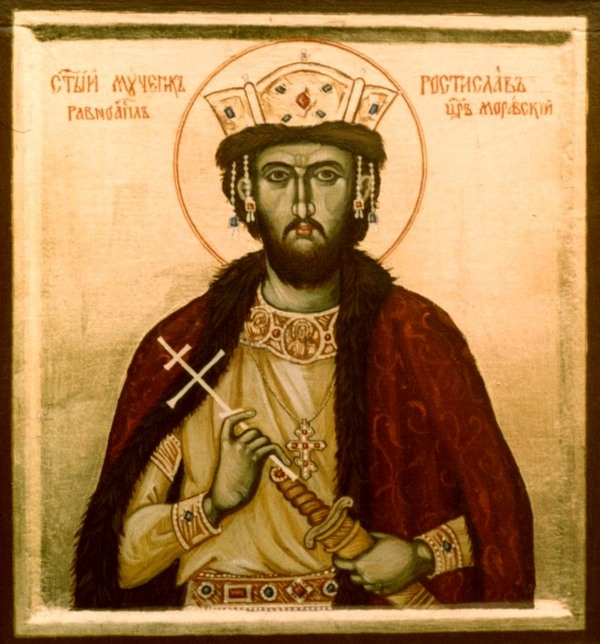
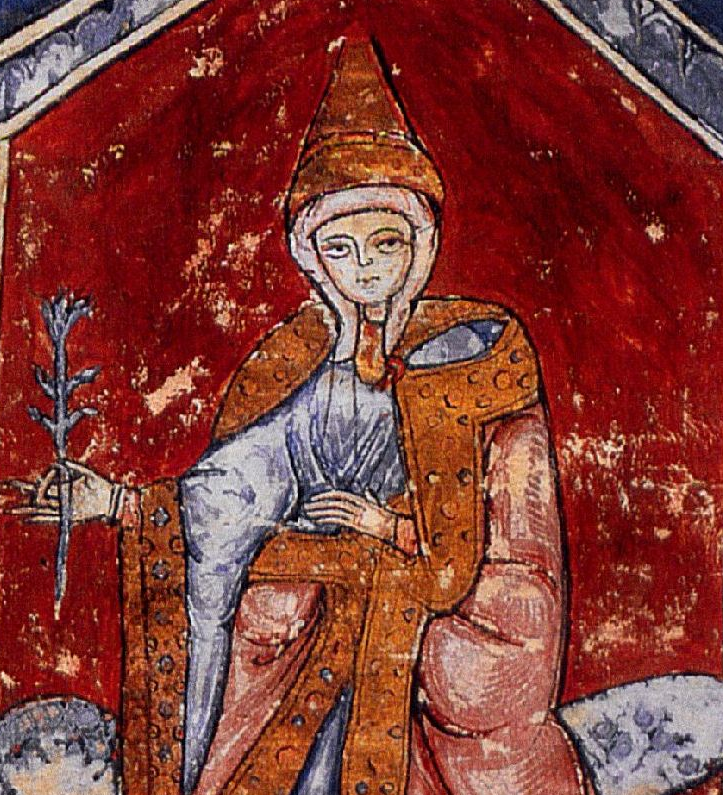
Players can select a variety of historical characters from either the 867, 1066 or 1178 start date. Interesting characters, noted by gaming media, include (clockwise from top left), King Sancho II of Castile, Count Hastein of Montaigu, Duchess Matilda of Tuscany and Duke Rastislav of Moravia.

Like its predecessors Crusader Kings and Crusader Kings II, Crusader Kings III is a grand strategy game and dynasty simulator set in the Middle Ages. Players begin as a character in either 867, 1066, or 1178, playing as a ruler of certain lands, or a landless character of a certain dynasty or family. The game map is significantly more detailed than in Crusader Kings II, incorporating Europe, parts of Africa, as well as new areas like China, Japan, Indonesia and various neighbouring areas. Each region is separated into many titles of different status, presented in rank descending order: Hegemonies, Empires, Kingdoms, Duchies, Counties and Baronies. Baronies – the lowest rank of the title – are bound to a certain settlement like cities or tribes; the amount of maximum counties the character should hold is defined by a number known as the "domain limit", exceeding which is fraught with negative effects for the character's entire country. In order to prevent exceeding the domain limit, the player can give any of their held titles to other characters.

Each character has a combination of six skills: Diplomacy, Martial, Stewardship, Intrigue, Learning and Prowess, all defining how good this character is in a corresponding field. Skills can be affected by various traits, like aspects of personality (laziness, greed, arrogance, calmness, etc), education (in certain skill like learning or intrigue, automatically given to all characters when they reach adulthood) and genetically inherited traits (like gigantism, natural poor or strong health, albinism). Each trait might also provide serious changes to the game, affecting many different factors aside from character's skills; making choices that go against a character's traits will increase the character's stress, reaching a certain level of which might result in negative and even lethal outcomes. Characters are also able to select one of six lifestyles to follow, with each lifestyle having three skill trees that allow characters to enhance skills related to that lifestyle.

All counties have their own type of government that can be changed under certain conditions and uniquely affect gameplay: feudal, tribal, wanua, nomadic, ecclesiastical, clan, mandala, meritocratic, celestial, ritsuryō, sōryō or administrative. Republics, herder and theocracies government types exist but are unplayable and used only by non-player characters (NPCs). Every county and character also has a changeable culture or religion bound to them. Each of these concepts is grouped by historical origin and provides certain bonuses for its lands and people. For culture, it is defined by Traditions (single bonuses, like specialisation on a certain terrain or unique society structure) and Ethos (one, total way of life of the culture like 'stoic' or 'communal'), while for religion it is defined by Tenets (practices like megalithic building or asceticism) and Doctrines (stances towards issues like homosexuality and female clergy).

Characters always control at least three types of resources: Prestige, Gold and Piety, with some regional resources like Influence and Treasure being specific for certain government types. Gold is used to build new buildings, buy mercenaries and personal items for the character, hire servants that provide useful bonuses, or host events like hunts or feasts. Prestige is used for various social interactions, sometimes together with gold, as well as for declaring war on other rulers to conquer a certain title. Piety is used for different interactions with religion, including changing and creating new ones.

Upon the death or deposition of a player's character they continue to play as that character's heir unless that character lacks any viable heir in which case the game will end. Overall, players develop a dynasty over the centuries, with the game ending in 1453, though the time limit can be turned off in the settings. The heads of dynasties are able to use a new resource known as Renown to assert their control over their house, as well as unlocking special bonuses that are applied on all members of the dynasty.

Levies are represented primarily by low-quality infantry composed of peasants. Characters will need to hire men-at-arms in order to field higher-quality soldiers, such as crossbowmen, heavy infantry and cavalry. Characters can make other characters from their court or realm with high combat skills (prowess) into powerful knights.

Unlike preceding games in the series, characters have full-body, 3D-rendered models. These character models can be customised with clothes and headwear by clicking the Barbershop button in the character menu. The characters' models change slightly to represent their age, status, health and traits.

== Development ==
Full map of the game available as of May 2026, showing playable areas of Europe, Asia and Africa with political borders, set in 1066 AD

Game director Henrik Fåhraeus commented that development of the game commenced "about 1 year before Imperator", indicating a starting time of 2015. Describing the game engine of Crusader Kings II as cobbled and "held together with tape", he explained that the new game features an updated engine (i.e. Clausewitz Engine and Jomini toolset) with more power to run new features.

As is the case with many of Paradox's unreleased and currently supported works, the developers publish a weekly developer diary. Each post focuses on a single aspect of the game, such as government types, user interface, governments, war, etc., how this aspect of the game will be handled in Crusader Kings III, and how it is different from Crusader Kings II. A monthly update video is also published on the Paradox Interactive YouTube channel, summarizing all of the changes which have been made in that month's developer diaries.

=== Downloadable content ===
Name	Accompanying Patch	Type	Release date	Description
Chapter I
Northern Lords	1.3 "Corvus"	Flavor Pack	16 March 2021	Northern Lords contains additional content pertaining to Viking Age Scandinavia including the ability to form adventurer realms, access to holy warriors and shield-maidens, unique dynastic legacies, and culture-specific events and decisions.
Royal Court	1.5 "Fleur-de-Lis"	Major Expansion	8 February 2022	Royal Court gives players a customizable throne room in which to welcome people to court. It also allows players to decorate the room in order to gain more Grandeur, a feature introduced in the expansion, which, when increased, will give access to higher quality guests. Additional features around artifacts, culture, and liege interactions were also included.
Fate of Iberia	1.6 "Castle"	Flavor Pack	31 May 2022	Fate of Iberia contains additional content focusing on the Iberian Peninsula during the Reconquista. Features include new cultural traditions and culture-specific events and decisions, along with universal mechanics around friend interactions and chess duels.
Friends and Foes	1.7 "Bastion"	Event Pack	8 September 2022	Friends and Foes contains over 100 additional events surrounding a character's relationships with their friends and rivals. Also includes memories that a character will reminisce over throughout their life.
Chapter II
Tours and Tournaments	1.9 "Lance"	Major Expansion	11 May 2023	Tours and Tournaments introduces the travel and grand activities systems as well as allowing rulers to bestow accolades to their knights.
Wards and Wardens	1.10 "Quill"	Event Pack	22 August 2023	Wards and Wardens adds events surrounding a character's childhood, parenting, and education. Also included are expanded mechanics around eccentric characters, midwifery, and exchanging hostages and wards.
Legacy of Persia	1.11 "Peacock"	Flavor Pack	9 November 2023	Legacy of Persia expands gameplay in the Persia region, and introduces the Iranian Intermezzo as a featured start date.
Chapter III
Legends of the Dead	1.12 "Scythe"	Core Expansion	4 March 2024	Legends of the Dead introduces the Black Death and other diseases which spread across the map along with the legend system, allowing characters to build their dynasty's legitimacy by promoting tales about the actions of their ancestors.
Roads to Power	1.13 "Basileus"	Major Expansion	24 September 2024	Roads to Power introduces the ability to play as a landless character, traveling across the map and taking on contracts as an adventurer. Additional mechanics include new administrative and imperial government mechanics, family estates, and content for the Byzantine Empire.
Wandering Nobles	1.14 "Traverse"	Event Pack	4 November 2024	Wandering Nobles adds events and activities connected to the travel system.
Chapter IV
Khans of the Steppe	1.16 "Chamfron"	Core Expansion	28 April 2025	Khans of the Steppe introduces new nomadic government mechanics revolving around managing animal herds, establishing dominance among other nomads, and dealing with the changing climate of the Eurasian Steppe through migration. Additional mechanics include Confederations and Tributaries.
Coronations	1.17 "Ascendant"	Event Pack	9 September 2025	Coronations adds new events and the coronation activity.
All Under Heaven	1.18 "Crane"	Major Expansion	28 October 2025	All Under Heaven expands the scope of the game's map to include all of Asia, introducing new government types, faiths, and cultural mechanics for regions such as China, Japan, Korea, and Southeast Asia. Other additions include hegemonies, dynastic cycles, great projects, and administrative treasuries.
Chapter V
By God Alone	1.20 "Crozier"	Core Expansion	30 September 2026	By God Alone overhauls the game's religious mechanics with many unique elements provided to Christianity, such as archdioceses and the College of Cardinals. Theocratic rulers, such as an archbishop or the Pope, also receive a new playable government type.
Silk & Silver		Major Expansion	17 November 2026	Silk & Silver adds new government types for republics and merchant companies, along with expanded mechanics for trade and historical Italian events such as the conflict between the Guelphs and Ghibellines.

=== Mods ===
Third-party mods for Crusader Kings III are available on the Steam Workshop. These mods can add new game mechanics or make graphical improvements. Some mods include the total conversion mod A Game of Thrones, which is set in the world of the novel series A Song of Ice and Fire; The Fallen Eagle, which changes the game's timeline to the fall of the Western Roman Empire; Warcraft: Guardians of Azeroth 2 (Reforged), which is set in the Warcraft video game series; and Realms in Exile, which is set in the world of the novel The Lord of the Rings.

== Release ==
The game was released on 1 September 2020 and is available through Steam and Xbox Game Pass for PC. The game is available in two editions: the Base Game Edition, which includes the base game and a pre-order bonus, and the Royal Edition, which includes the base game and an expansion pass. The expansion pass contains a collection of additional content packs and the first expansion.

Crusader Kings III was initially rejected by the Australian Classification Board, reportedly over complications regarding the game's classification. However, the Australian Classification Board denied having contact with Paradox Interactive, who claimed they sought classification through the third party distributor Plaion, formerly Koch Media. The game was eventually cleared and released in Australia six days after its initial release, on 7 September 2020. Because of its delayed release, the pre-order bonus window was extended to 21 September exclusively for Australian Steam users.

A console version of the game was released on PlayStation 5 and Xbox Series X and Series S on 29 March 2022. The game was made available on Xbox Game Pass on the same day.

== Reception ==
Reception

Aggregate score
Aggregator	Score
Metacritic	PC: 91/100; PS5: 85/100; XSXS: 83/100

Review scores
Publication	Score
GameRevolution	9/10
GameSpot	8/10
IGN	10/10
PC Gamer (US)	94/100
PCGamesN	9/10
Push Square	8/10
Shacknews	9/10
VentureBeat	5/5
VG247	5/5

Crusader Kings III received "generally favorable" reviews for PlayStation 5 and Xbox Series X/S according to review aggregator platform Metacritic; the PC version received "universal acclaim". Leana Hafer of IGN wrote that the game "is a superb strategy game, a great RPG, and a master class in how to take the best parts of existing systems and make them deeper and better"; scoring it 10/10 in her review. Lauren Aitken from VG247 also gave the game a perfect score, writing it is "just as bonkers, unpredictable and enthralling as its predecessor."

David Wildgoose of GameSpot praised the procedural narratives of the game saying that they are rarely as affecting and poignant as they are here; on the other hand, as a negative point, he wrote that "when the story engine isn't firing, your actions can feel rote and uninspired".

The console port of the game has been criticized by players due to being "unplayable" during the late-game due to technological bottlenecks, frequent crashes, overheating, and other limitations to console capabilities. Paradox and Lab42 have been working to fix these issues by removing the 3D models in family trees and more frequent clearing of the game's cache. Because of Lab42 struggling to develop the console version of the game, they were later replaced by Dragon lake.

=== Sales ===
The game sold more than 1 million copies within 1 month of release. It was the seventh best-selling game in September 2020 in the US, and had the highest launch month sales for any Paradox Interactive title. In March 2022, Paradox Interactive announced that Crusader Kings III had sold over 2 million units worldwide. In September 2023, Paradox Interactive announced that Crusader Kings III had sold over 3 million units worldwide. As of April 2025, Crusader Kings III has sold over 4 million copies worldwide.

=== Accolades ===
In December 2020, Crusader Kings III was nominated in the Best Sims/Strategy category at The Game Awards, but lost to Microsoft Flight Simulator. In April 2021, Crusader Kings III also received a nomination for Strategy/Simulation Game of the Year at the 24th Annual D.I.C.E. Awards, again losing out to Microsoft Flight Simulator.

== See also ==
- List of grand strategy video games
- List of Paradox Interactive games
- List of historical video games
