= Riaad Moosa =

South African comedian, actor and doctor (born 1976)

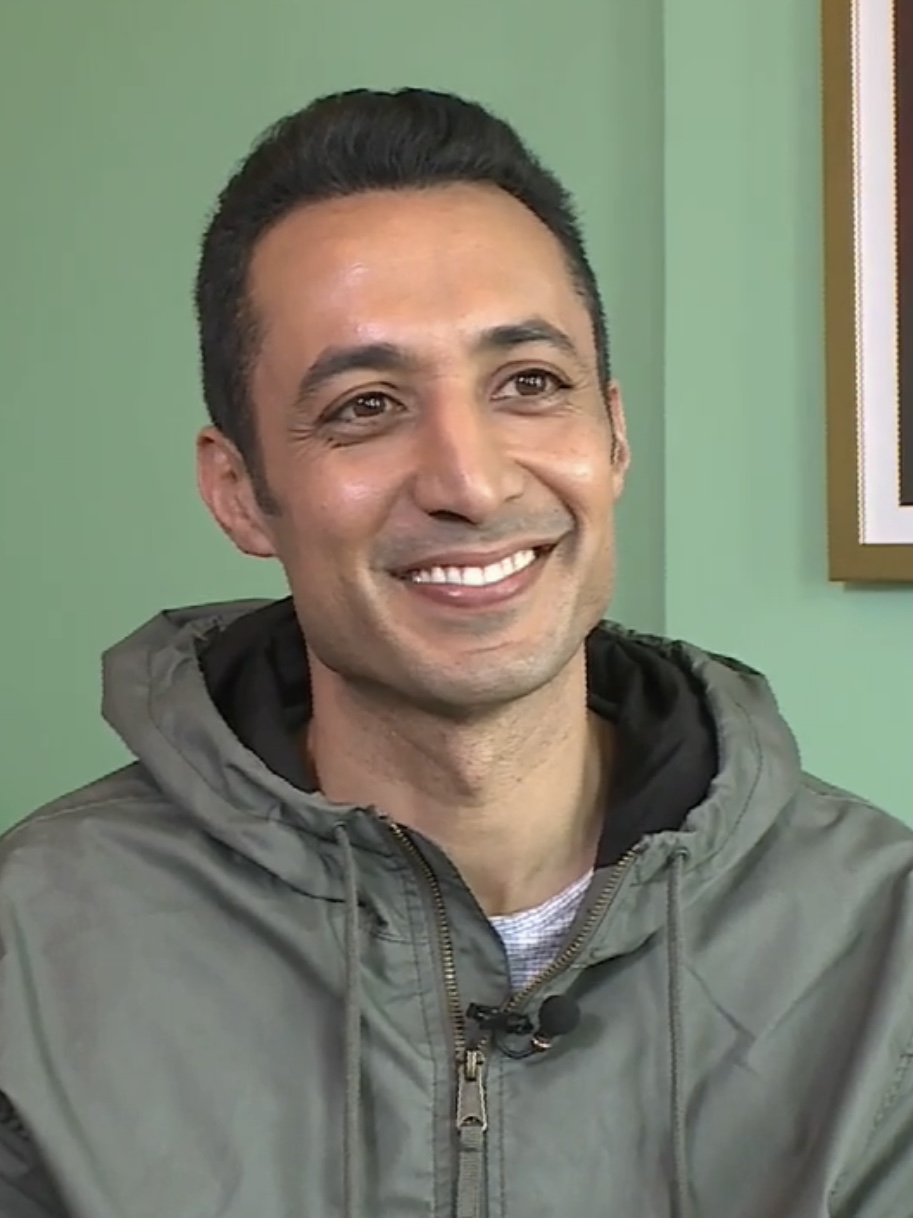
- Moosa in 2020
- Born: 18 June 1977 (age 49); Western Cape, South Africa
- Education: University of Cape Town
- Notable work: Material, Mandela: Long Walk to Freedom (film)
- Spouse: Farzanah Bemat (m. 2003)

Comedy career
- Years active: 1999–present
- Medium: Stand-up, television, film
- Genres: Observational comedy, satire, impressions
- Subjects: Islamic humour, Indian culture, racism, political humour, medical
- Website: www.riaadmoosa.co.za

Riaad Moosa (Urdu: رياض موسی; born 18 June 1977) is a South African comedian, actor and doctor.

== Early life ==
Moosa grew up in Grassy Park and has three siblings. He attended South Peninsula High School until 1994. His sister is a doctor, his Indian-born father is an orthopaedic surgeon, his Cape Town-born Malay mother is a GP. Since he was a child, he wanted to do medicine.

Moosa spent three years training in magic and became a silver medallion graduate of the College of Magic in Cape Town. He started his comedy career as a comedy magician and he was presented with the Comedy Magic award at the Center for the Magical Arts in Cape Town. His future in magic was terminated when somebody doing flash photography illuminated the wire across the stage where his magic orb was floating.

Moosa then spent six years training in medicine at University of Cape Town Medical School and did his internship in hospitals near Thokoza in Gauteng, at Groote Schuur and Khayelitsha in Cape Town. In 2001, he graduated from UCT Medical School. He is a qualified medical doctor and GP. He then worked for three years as a doctor.

== Stand-up career ==
Moosa started doing stand-up on campus during his fourth year at University of Cape Town. He started performing stand-up at the Cape Comedy Collective's free Comedy Lab workshops, and just two months later, he was the winner of the "One City, Many Comics Talent Competition" held as part of the One City Festival in September 1999. He became a regular headliner on the comedy circuit during his first year, where he was also invited to perform on Pieter-Dirk Uys's Evita Live and Dangerous e.tv comedy show. In 2000, he came to prominence on the comedy-club circuit in Cape Town.

Moosa has starred in the Alex Jay 5FM Comedy Jams and Real Concert's Winston King Size Comedy Show, headlining the Sprite Soul Comedy Jams in Cape Town, Johannesburg and Durban. In 2001, he supported Marc Curry of Hanging with Mr. Cooper fame at the Durban Playhouse. In 2002, he supported Russell Peters in his show Made in India at the Luxurama theatre. In 2003, he performed at the Edinburgh Festival Fringe, headlining in the Cape Comedy Collective – The new South Africa Stands Up production.

His previous sold-out one-man shows include Strictly Halaal and Riaad Moosa for the Baracka, and Three Wise Men and Three Wiser Men, the hit comedy shows created by David Kramer.

From September 2006 to March 2007, Moosa had a schedule of sold-out one-man show runs like Strictly Halaal and Riaad Moosa for the Baracka in Johannesburg, Durban and Cape Town during its first run. Both shows prompted extended runs until May 2007, and were also released on DVD. In 2006, Moosa also appeared in the Heavyweight Comedy Jam in London. He was also featured at corporate events and media engagements.

In 2007, Riaad toured South Africa with the American Muslim comedy troupe, Allah Made Me Funny, doing the Make Love Not War show. South African Muslim comedian Halal Bilal performed with them on this, his first big tour since he started performing with Riaad a month before.

In 2008, Riaad appeared alongside Marc Lottering and Nik Rabinowitz, in the variety comedy show 3 Wise Men, directed by David Kramer.

His stand-up comedy was included in the DVD for the Blacks Only comedy shows, along with other local comedians. He featured in the Anant Singh and John Vlismas produced comedy-collective feature film Outrageous, which played at cinemas nationwide in 2009, and was released on DVD in April 2010.

In February 2010, Moosa was one of the headline acts along with other South African comedians (including Trevor Noah, David Kau, John Vlismas, Tumi Morake and Marc Lottering). He supported Eddie Izzard for the 46664 It's No Joke concert.

In November 2012, he performed Keeping You in Stitches comedy show at the Cape Town International Convention Centre.

In October 2013, he started his Doctor's Orders tour in South Africa.

Moosa took part in South African national comedy tour, Just Funny Festival, where he hosted Azhar Usman, Mo Amer and Preacher Moss (Allah Made Me Funny).

In January and February 2013, Moosa performed at the Baxter Theatre with a show called What's Next. Later in the year, he went on his "Doctor's Orders Tour" throughout South Africa, Africa and the United Kingdom.

== Television career ==
Moosa is a regular presenter of a segment entitled The Second Opinion – with Dr Riaad Moosa on the E-News channel's satirical news programme Late Nite News with Loyiso Gola. He has appeared in various TV and film productions. In 2002, he performed on Laugh Out Loud, South Africa's largest stand-up comedy television show, where he joined nine of South Africa's top comics to raise half a million Rand for the Reach for a Dream foundation. In 2004, he was also a writer and performer for SABC 1's Pure Monate Show.

In February 2013, Moosa hosted Comedy Central Presents Riaad Moosa Live at Parker's on Comedy Central. In June 2013, he replaced Michael Mol on hosting SABC 3's The Dr Mol Show (originally titled Hello Doctor). The show was subsequently renamed Doctor's Orders.

== Acting career ==
In 2005, Moosa appeared in Crazy Monkey Straight Outta Benoni. In 2007, he also featured in the sequel Footskating 101.

In 2012, Moosa starred in the comedy film Material, playing a young man who wants to be a comedian but his father disapproves.

In October 2012, he went to the Busan International Film Festival in Seoul, South Korea where Material was shown, In November 2012, Moosa visited London, England to promote the film at the BFI London Film Festival. In 2013, he will be going to the Asian Film Festival in Goa.

In 2013, he played the role of former South African politician and political prisoner, Ahmed Kathrada in Mandela: Long Walk to Freedom, an adaptation of Nelson Mandela's autobiography Long Walk to Freedom.

== Comedy style ==
Moosa uses comedy to tackle sensitive issues like Islamic stereotypes, Islamophobia, racism and prolapsed hemorrhoids. His other subjects range from Bollywood to current politics to apartheid. Moosa chooses not to use profanity and explicit vocabulary.

== Awards ==
In March 2011, Moosa was awarded the Comics Choice Award at the first annual South African Comic's Choice Awards. In 2012, he was nominated for the Comic's Choice Awards. He won best actor at The South African Film and Television Awards (SAFTA's) in 2013 for his role in Material which also won best picture.

== Personal life ==
On 12 January 2003, Moosa married businesswoman Farzanah Bemat. They live in Johannesburg, Gauteng with their three children, Zameer (born 2007) and Hanaa (born 2009). and Mahir. Some of Moosa's comic material is inspired by his family.

== See also ==
- Islamic humour
- Islam in South Africa
