= Footskating 101 =

- Directed by: Thomas Ferreira, Brendan Jack
- Written by: Ronnie Apteker, Brendan Jack
- Produced by: Ronnie Apteker, Tendeka Matatu
- Starring: Rob van Vuuren, Brendan Jack
- Release date: 14 September 2007
- Running time: 83 minutes
- Country: South Africa
- Language: English
- Budget: ZAR 1 million (Roughly US$ 147,500)

Footskating 101 is a 2007 independently produced, South African comedy film.

== Plot ==
In order to save his grandmother, his town, and his own skin, Vince, a poor miner's son, takes part in a skateboarding competition without a skateboard. He invents the extreme sport of footskating.

== Production ==
The film was independently produced.

== Trivia ==
- The film is dedicated to Brett Goldin, one of the original members of Crazy monkey, and avid footskater, who died in 2006. Originally, Goldin was meant to portray the role of Vince in the film.
- The film also stars Craig Archer as a crowd member, comedians John Vlismas, Rob van Vuuren, Kagiso Lediga and Riaad Moosa, Shaun "Worm" Brauteseth from the punk rock group The Finkelstiens, newsreader Reuben Goldberg, DJs Elana Afrika, Ian F and Sasha Martinengo, Isidingo actor Robert Whitehead and supermodel Kerry McGregor.
