= Vincent Ebrahim =

South African actor and comedian (born 1949)

Vincent Ibrahim
- Born: 1949 (age 76–77); East London, Eastern Cape, South Africa
- Citizenship: South African
- Education: University of Cape Town
- Occupations: Actor; comedian
- Years active: 1976–present
- Notable work: The Physician
- Relatives: Vinette Ebrahim (sister)

Vincent Ebrahim (born 1949) is a South African actor and comedian. He is known for portraying the roles of Ashwin in the BBC later Sky One comedy series The Kumars at No. 42 (2001–2006, 2014), pub landlord Bobby in the BBC One comedy series After You've Gone (2007–2008), Robert "Big Bob" Gupta in the Channel 4 soap opera Hollyoaks (2014) and Hashim Elamin in the ITV soap opera Coronation Street (2021).

== Early life ==
Ebrahim studied drama at the University of Cape Town. He immigrated to England in 1976, where he began an acting career. He is the brother of actress Vinette Ebrahim.

== Career ==
Ebrahim spent a decade with community theatre companies performing in plays such as Away From It by the Common Stock Theatre Company, Borderline by Hanif Kureishi and the Joint Stock Theatre Company and infamous stage play Tartuffe. Since 1990, he has worked with Tara Arts, performing in such plays as Le Bourgeois gentilhomme, Tartuffe, Oedipus Rex, Troilus and Cressida, and Antigone. He has also performed in many radio plays for BBC World Service and BBC Radio 4 in the UK. He also appeared on stage at the Tricycle Theatre in the critically praised play The Great Game. Ebrahim is probably best known for playing Ashwin Kumar, the finance-obsessed father on The Kumars at No. 42. In March 2013, he won the Safta for Best Supporting Actor in a Feature Film for his work in Material, which won the best film award.

== Filmography ==
Year	Title	Role	Notes
1976	Springbok	James Louw	Film
2001–2006	The Kumars at No. 42	Ashwin Kumar	All 53 episodes
2002	Comedy Lab	Nitin's Dad	Episode: "Meet the Magoons"
2003	Top of the Pops	Ashwin Kumar	1 episode
2003	Comic Relief 2003: The Big Hair Do (TV Special)	Ashwin Kumar	Charity special
2003	Clocking Off	Mehmood Usmani	Episode: "Grace and Faz's Story"
2003	Holby City	Habib Massoud	Episode: "A Friend in Need"
2003	Doctors	Ashok Sharma	Episode: "Cut Loose"
2003	Children in Need	Ashwin Kumar	Series 1: Episode 24
2003	Bedtime	Mohammad	3 episodes
2005	Meet the Magoons	Nitin's dad	4 episodes
2005	Wallace & Gromit: The Curse of the Were-Rabbit	Mr. Caliche	Film; voice role
2006	Ideal	Mr Rupani	Episodes: "The Landlord" and "The Guest"
2006	New Street Law	Sonny Mehta	Series 1: Episode 5
2007–2008	After You've Gone	Bobby	All 25 episodes
2007	Doctors	Mohammed Abbasi	Episode: "Losing It All"
2008	The Life Class	Vaslav	Short
2008	Ruby xx Jack	Narrator	Short
2009	Compulsion	Satvik	Film
2010	The Old Guys	Rajan	6 episodes
2010	Hotel Trubble	Dave	Episode: "Fangs for the Memories"
2011	Little Crackers	Uncle Arun	Episode: "Sanjeev Bhaskar's Little Cracker: Papaji Saves Christmas"
2011	Lazy Uncle	Uncle Arun	Short
2012	Material	Ebrahim Kaif	Film
2013	Doctors	Shiva Shandar	Episode: "One Got Away"
2013	The Physician	Tughrul	Film
2014	The Kumars	Ashwin Kumar	All 6 episodes'
2014	Hollyoaks	Robert "Big Bob" Gupta	Recurring role; 7 episodes
2016	Hoff the Record	Uncle Ron	Episode: "Death Hoax"
2016	Casualty	Saeed Sarwar	Episode: "Chain Reaction"
2016	Allied	Driver in Desert	Film
2018	The Looming Tower	Wadih el-Hage	Episode: "Now it Begins..."
2018	Happy New Year, Colin Burstead	Nikhil	Film
2018	The Queen and I	Judge	Television film
2020	Killing Eve	Mike	Episode: "End of Game"
2020	New Material	Ebrahim Kaif	Film
2020	National Theatre Live: Dara	Emperor Shah Jahan	Video
2021	Coronation Street	Hashim Elamin	Recurring role
