= Nik Rabinowitz =

South African comedian, actor and author

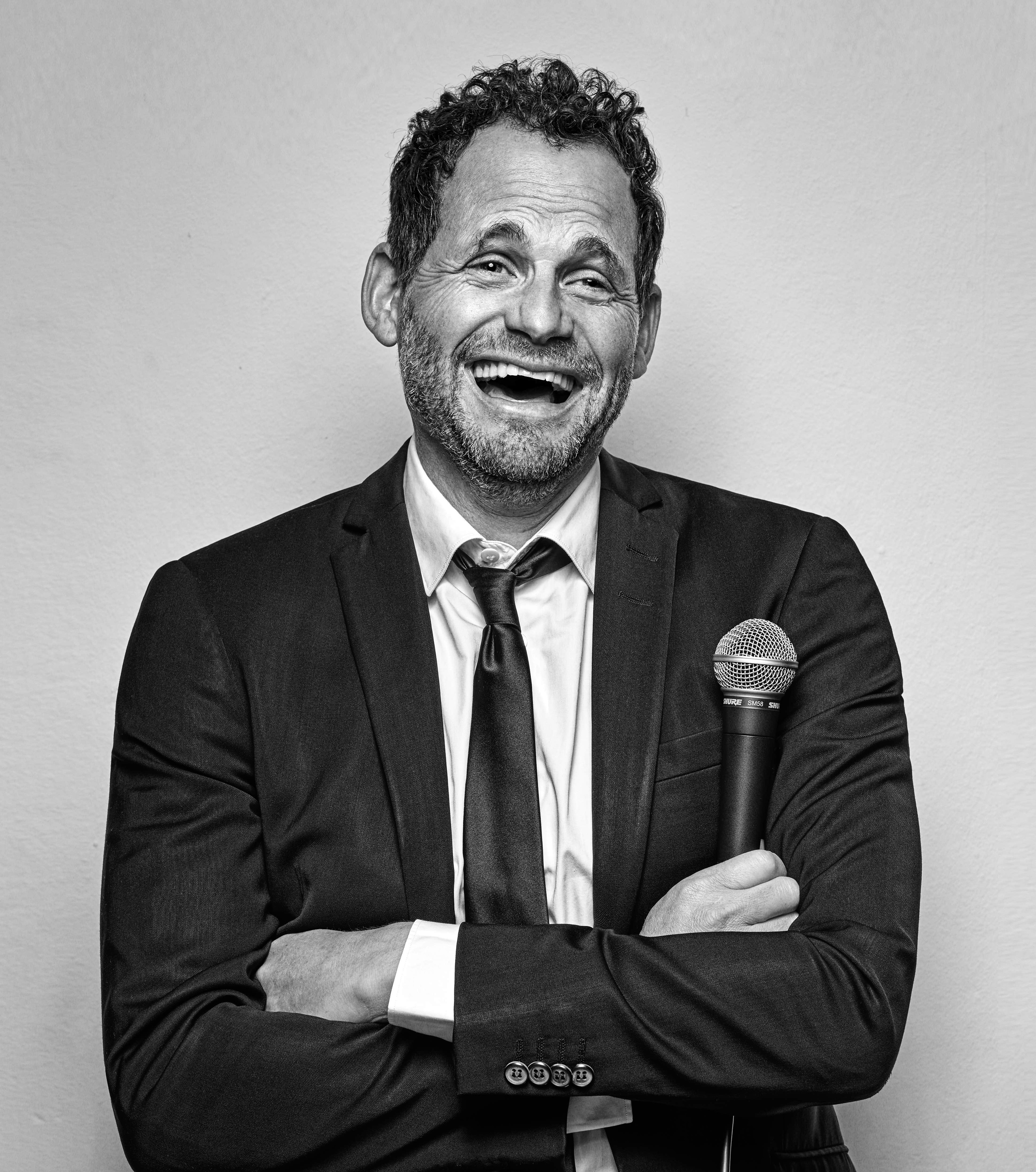
- Born: 3 October 1976 (age 50); Cape Town, South Africa
- Education: University of Cape Town
- Spouse: Debbie Rabinowitz
- Children: 3

Comedy career
- Genres: Stand-up comedy, television, film, radio

Nik Rabinowitz is a South African stand-up comedian, actor, author, TV presenter, and podcast host, known for his multilingual comedy and social commentary.

He's appeared in various television shows, feature films, and has performed stand-up comedy internationally, including on the British panel show Mock the Week.

He lives in Cape Town with his wife and three children, and continues to work in the entertainment industry both locally and internationally.

== Early life ==
Rabinowitz was raised on the farm Eagles Nest, in Constantia, Cape Town, to parents Jenifer (a former architecture student and interior designer) and potter Hym Rabinowitz.

He grew up in a secular Jewish family and learned to speak isiXhosa growing up on the farm, where he developed the multilingual abilities that would later become a distinctive feature of his comedy.

Rabinowitz initially attended a Waldorf School, later moving to Grove Primary and matriculating at Westerford High, before graduating from the University of Cape Town (1999) with a Bachelor of Business Science (Hons in Organisational Psychology).

== Career ==
Comedy

Rabinowitz began his comedy career in the early 2000s, quickly establishing himself in the South African comedy scene. His comedy often draws on his Jewish heritage, his observations of South African society, and his ability to mimic various South African accents and languages. His multilingual capabilities, especially his fluency in isiXhosa, have become a notable aspect of his performances. One man specials include:

- Pension Killer (2024)
- Rambunctious (2023)
- Unmuted (2022)
- Late Bloomer (2019)
- Dry White (2018)
- Fortyfied (2016)
- Power Struggle (2016)

Acting Beyond stand-up comedy, Rabinowitz has appeared in several films and TV productions:

- Just Now Jeffrey (2024) - Narrator & Moshik
- The Shakedown (2024) - Horse Racing Commentator
- Tali's Baby Diary (2021) - Auctioneer
- Material (2012) - Dave Gold
- Khumba (2013) - Frikkie/Percy
- I Now Pronounce You Black and White (2010) - Twasa
- The Deal (2008) - Lead Carpenter

Radio, TV and Internet

- Former host of Cape Talk and Talk Radio 702's The Week that Wasn't with presenter Redi Thlabi
- Voice actor for ZA News (a satirical puppet show) where he voiced in excess of 25 characters.
- He currently hosts the sports podcast Banter with the Boys with former Springbok rugby players Jean de Villiers, Schalk Burger and former Proteas cricketer Christopher Morris.

== Writing ==
In early 2012, Rabinowitz published his first book (co-authored with Gillian Breslin) entitled "South Africa: Long Walk to a Free Ride", a satirical look at contemporary South African society.

== Style and Themes ==
Rabinowitz's comedy frequently explores South African identity, politics, and cultural differences. He is known for his ability to navigate sensitive social issues through humor and has been praised for his unique perspective on South African society. His comedy often challenges stereotypes while highlighting the absurdities of life in post-apartheid South Africa. As a Jewish comedian who speaks English, Afrikaans and isiXhosa, Rabinowitz occupies a unique space in South African comedy, using his cross-cultural experiences to bridge divides through humour.

== Filmography ==
Year	Title	Role	Notes
2024	Just Now Jeffrey	Adult Jeffrey (Narrator) / Moshik	
2021	Tail's baby diary	Auctioneer	
2014	Sophia Grace & Rosie's Royal Adventure	Emcee	
2014	Puppet Nation ZA	Numerous voices (including Archbishop Desmond Tutu, Gareth Cliff, Victor Matfield, Ninja (Die Antwoord), Pieter De Villiers, Vladimir Putin, Bashir Al Assad, Patricia de Lille, Benni McCarthy, Carlos Perreira, Sepp Blatter, Danny Jordaan, The Pope, and Oscar Pistorius)	
2013	Khumba	Frikkie / Percy (voice)	
2012	Copposites	Terry de Kock	
2012	Adventures in Zambezia	Hurricanes (voice)	
2012	Material	Dave Gold	
2010	I now pronounce you Black and White	The Twaza	
2008	The Deal	Lead Carpenter	

== Personal life ==
In 2009, Nik married Dr Debbie Rabinowitz, a general practitioner, transformational coach and Woman Within International facilitator. Together they have three children, Benjamin (born 2009), Adam (born 2012) and Sophie (born 2016).
