= The Kumars at No. 42 =

British television series

- Genre: Sitcom
- Created by: Sharat Sardana
- Starring: Sanjeev Bhaskar; Meera Syal; Indira Joshi; Vincent Ebrahim
- Country of origin: United Kingdom
- Original language: English
- No. of series: 7
- No. of episodes: 53

Production
- Production location: Fountain Studios
- Running time: 30 minutes
- Production company: Hat Trick Productions

Original release
- Network: BBC Two (2001–2004); BBC One (2005–2006)
- Release: 12 November 2001 – 18 August 2006
- Network: Sky 1
- Release: 15 January – 19 February 2014

The Kumars at No. 42 is a British television sitcom. It won an International Emmy in 2002 and 2003, and won a Peabody Award in 2004. It ran for seven series totalling 53 episodes.

== Plot ==
The show stars a fictional British Indian family, including Madhuri and Ashwin Kumar (played by Indira Joshi and Vincent Ebrahim), their adult son Sanjeev (played by Sanjeev Bhaskar), and Sushila, Sanjeev's grandmother, normally referred to as Ummi (played by Meera Syal, later Bhaskar's real-life wife). The family lives in Wembley, London, England. The show's central premise is that Sanjeev's parents have supported his dream of being a television presenter by having a TV studio built on what used to be their back garden. Running gags include Sanjeev's apparent social ineptitude, Ashwin's obsession with financial matters and his tendency to tell long stories with no real point and Ummi's stories of her absurd exploits with her childhood friend Saraswati "the Bicycle" (so named because of her contortionist skills). It is also a regular conceit that the guests' appearance fees are paid in Bimla's chutney.

The show has an improvisational feel, though in reality much of the regular cast's performance was scripted but the guest interviews were not. In the early episodes only Meera Syal improvised to any great extent though as the cast became accustomed to their characters, the improvised content increased for later episodes. Bhaskar stated in a 2009 interview, "We never rehearsed the guests, and the best ones were the ones to keep the ball in the air."

== Production ==
When talking about The Hitchhiker's Guide to the Galaxy for the British Book Awards, Sanjeev Bhaskar stated that he chose 42 as the house number because in the Hitchhiker's series 42 features prominently as the Answer to Life, the Universe, and Everything.

Sanjeev Bhaskar told interviewer Mark Lawson in August 2007 that the inspiration for the series was an embarrassing evening when he took a girlfriend to meet his parents. They asked her awkward questions and he wondered how they would react if he invited a famous person to his home. Ashwin and Madhuri are exaggerated versions of his own parents.

The show's UK debut was on 12 November 2001 on BBC Two. It was produced by Hat Trick Productions and Pariah Television. Seven series of the programme have aired on BBC Two (and latterly on BBC One), with the seventh shown in 2006. In an interview for Radio Times in May 2007, Bhaskar confirmed that the show had run its course and there were no plans for any further series.

The Kumars also made a guest appearance on the 2003 Comic Relief single "Spirit in the Sky" performed by Gareth Gates. They also starred in the video. It reached number 1 in the charts and sold more than 550,000 copies.

== International ==
The Kumars at Number 42 was shown in Asia (including India and Malaysia) on the Star World satellite TV channel and on SABC in South Africa. The Australian Broadcasting Corporation screened it in Australia. Its previous time slot, being right before hugely successful Australian comedy Kath & Kim, made the programme successful there. It was very popular in New Zealand as well, where it was screened by Television New Zealand. It has been broadcast in the United States on BBC America, and in Canada on BBC Canada, a digital cable channel. It was shown in Sweden, as Curry Curry talkshow, by SVT2 in 2004, in the Netherlands on the public broadcasting foundation NPS (Nederland 3), in Switzerland on Swiss TV station DRS, and in India on Comedy Central.

In August 2002, the American network NBC entered a deal to buy the format but later dropped out.

A new version of the show was planned for Sunday evenings on Fox, restyled as a show in the 2003-04 season featuring a Latino-American family called The Ortegas and featuring Cheech Marin. However the program was dropped from Fox's post-baseball playoffs schedule to focus the network's schedule on the success of The O.C. at the time, and became another one of Fox's series which were scheduled, but never made it to air. Six episodes were produced, but never aired.

The Australian version, Greeks on the Roof (featuring Greek Australians), debuted in 2003 but was soon taken off the air because of very low ratings.

ARY Digital has produced a Pakistani version of the show called Ghaffar at Dhoraji featuring a Gujarati family living in Karachi. Sony Television has produced an Indian version of the show called Batliwalla House No. 43 featuring a Parsee family living in Mumbai.

In Russia, Channel One made the Armenian version of the show called Rubik Vsemogushchiy (en: Rubik Allmighty; Rubik is a short for the Armenian name Ruben). The idea of the show was that an Armenian named Rubik (played by Ruben Dzhaginyan) and his family interview the Russian stars (such as pop singers Vera Brezhneva and Anna Semenovich; TV presenters Dmitri Dibrov, Timur Rodriguez (real name Timur Yunusov), Valdis Pelsh and Sergei Svetlakov; and actors Igor Vernik and Anastasia Zavorotnyuk). There were just four episodes of the show, and it was soon taken off the air because of generally negative reviews from critics.

== Revivals ==
On 1 May 2012, it was announced that a pilot for a revival of the show would be produced by Hat Trick Productions as The Kumars at No. 42B for Sky 1. The pilot was said to focus on a divorced Sanjeev and his family who now live in a flat (No. 42B) behind their Hounslow gift shop.

A 6-episode series was commissioned after a successful pilot, renamed simply to The Kumars, which started on 15 January 2014.

=== Episodes ===
#	Guests
1	Daniel Radcliffe, Chevy Chase and Olivia Colman
2	Rupert Everett, Dame Diana Rigg and Ray Winstone
3	Kay Burley, Elizabeth McGovern and Harry Shearer
4	Jenny Agutter, Brian Blessed, Shane Filan, Adrian Lester and Deborah Meaden
5	Emilia Fox, Richard E. Grant and Caroline Quentin
6	Heston Blumenthal, James Corden, Terry Gilliam, Hugh Jackman, Ash King and Twiggy

=== Radio ===
Meera Syal revived her character from the series in 2021 for BBC Radio 4's Gossip and Goddesses with Granny Kumar.

== See also ==
- British television programmes with Asian leads
