= Piano City =

2014 mobile video game

- Developer: Room 8 Studio
- Publisher: Room 8 Studio
- Engine: Cocos 2dx
- Platform: iOS
- Genre: Music/Simulation
- Modes: Single-player, Player versus player

Piano City is a Social Music Game for iOS developed and published by UK-based game development company Room 8 Studio. The game was released on September 24, 2014. Piano City is a music game that takes player to a journey, where he competes in different concert recitals while building up piano skills. The game also has a PvP mode, where anyone can play with other Piano City players.

== Gameplay ==
Player starts at the School Hall with basic songs and progresses through the story, while improving skills, playing both classical music and modern hits. During the journey, players will collect different items and pass musical quests. The game has 4 main characters:

- Magnus - Piano master who will help the player to master his skills.
- Arthur - Young, arrogant but very promising pianist.
- Kim - A friend, that will support the player.
- Tom - Beginner pianist who is often offended by Arthur.

== Reception ==
Piano City was honored by the iOS App Store and listed as #5 in Best Games of September collection and also reached #1 music game rank in 126 countries.

== Updates ==
The game receives regular thematic updates dedicated to holidays.

- Update 1.3 (October 22) - Halloween theme, more than 20 new melodies added (including SIA, PSY, Europe, Yiruma, Katy B), new halls added with more than 40 quests, new collections.
- Update 1.4 (Upcoming) - Christmas theme, new melodies, halls, renewed game balance, bug fixes.

== List of compositions ==
Free compositions		Premium composition	
Title	Author	Title	Author
Twinkle Twinkle	National	Bad Romance	Lady Gaga
Little Hans	National	Smoke On The Water	Deep Purple
Green Sleeves	National	Chariots of Fire	Vangelis
Auf Flugeln des Gesanges	Mendelssohn	Never Let Me Down Again	Depeche Mode
Wiegenlied	Mozart	Drops of Jupiter	Train
Ode To Joy	Beethoven	It's Time	Imagine Dragons
When The Saints Go Marching In	National	She Will Be Loved	Maroon 5
Edelweiss	National	Your Song	Elton John
London Bridge	National	I Was Made For Lovin’ You	Kiss
The Blue Danube Waltz	Strauss	On Top Of The World	Imagine Dragons
Air on the G String	Bach	This Love	Maroon 5
Lullaby	Brahms	All By Myself	Celine Dion
Der Lindenbaum	Schubert	I Will Survive	Gloria Gaynor
Requiem Lacrimosa	Mozart	Zombie	Cranberries
Salut d'Amour	Elgar	Apologize	OneRepublic
Morning Mood	Grieg	Same Mistake	James Blunt
The Lord is Risen Today	National	How to Save a Life	The Fray
Santa Lucia	National	Counting Stars	OneRepublic
Adagio	Albinoni	Valerie	Mark Ronson and Amy Winehouse
Aria Figaro	Mozart	Chandelier	Sia
The Four Seasons Spring Allegro	Vivaldi	Gentleman	PSY
Bourree from Suite for Lute	Bach	The Final Countdown	Europe
Rigoletto	Verdi	River Flows	Yiruma
William Tell Overture	Rossini	Crying for No Reason	Katy B
Unfinished Symphony	Schubert	Still Loving You	Scorpions
Die Forelle	Schubert	Chasing the Sun	The Wanted
Halleluja	Handel	I Wanna Dance with Somebody	Whitney Houston
In the Hall of the Mountain King	Grieg	Candle in the Wind	Elton John
Swan Lake	Tchaikovsky	The Bad Touch	Bloodhound Gang
Les Toreadors from Carmen Suite	Bizet		
Fur Elise	Beethoven		
La Bamba	National		
Wedding March	Mendelssohn		
Traumerei	Schumann		
Triumph March from Aida	Verdi		
La Cucaracha	National		
Menuet in G Dur	Bach		
Piano Quintet in E♭ major	Schumann		
Radetzky Marsch	Johann Strauss I		
Wien Bleibt Wien Marsch	Johann Schrammel		
The Hokey Cokey	National		
Minuet	Boccherini		
Rhapsody on a Theme Paganini	Rachmaninoff		
Reverie	Debussy		
Joy to the World	National		
Moonlight Sonata	Beethoven		
L'Amour est un Oiseau Rebelle	Bizet		
The Bell Tolls	Liszt		
Nachtmusik Allegro	Mozart		
Military Marche	Schubert		
Can Can	Offenbach		
Dance of the Little Swans	Tchaikovsky		
Jesu Joy Of Man Desiring	Bach		
Carmen Prelude	Bizet		
If You're Happy and You Know It	National		
Yankee Doodle	National		
Cannon In D major	Johann Pachelbel		
Humoresque	Dvorak		
Swanee River	Foster		
Ride of the Valkyries	Richard Wagner		
Ten Little Indians	National		
Cuckoo	Louis-Claude Daquin		
Cinderella	National		
Trumpeter Serenade	Spindler		
Impromptus	Schubert		
Arabesgue Op 18	Schumann		
The Entertainer	Scott Joplin		
Song Of The Lark	Tchaikovsky		
Fantasy in D Minor	Mozart		
Italian Song	Tchaikovsky		
Symphony no. 40	Mozart		
Requiem - Kyrie Eleison	Mozart		
Toccata and Fugue in D	Bach		
The Nutcracker	Tchaikovsky		
