= Cyto (video game) =

2013 puzzle video game

- Developer: Room 8 Studio
- Publisher: Chillingo
- Engine: Cocos2d
- Platforms: Windows; Mac OS X iOS; Android
- Release: Android; February 21, 2013; Mac; October 22, 2013; Windows; October 23, 2013; Android; December 19, 2013
- Genre: Puzzle
- Mode: Single-player

Cyto (formerly Cyto's Puzzle Adventure) is a casual physics based puzzle mobile game developed by Ukrainian game development studio Room 8. The game was first released on the iOS App Store on February 21, 2013.

== Gameplay ==
The main goal of this game is to help Cyto recover his lost memories by collecting memory fragments through numerous levels of gameplay across various worlds. Cyto has a gelatinous envelope that deforms and stretches when player touches it.

== Reception ==
Reception

Aggregate score
Aggregator	Score
Metacritic	iOS: 71%

Review scores
Publication	Score
TouchArcade	4.5/5
Vandal	iOS: 8.2/10
148Apps	iOS: 4/5
Slide to Play	iOS: 75/100

Reviews for Cyto were mostly positive. Eli Cymet of TouchArcade said that "it'll be a delight for your left and right brain alike". Alberto González of Vandal.net stated: "it's addictive and accessible, two good reasons to give it a try".

== Awards ==
In December 2012, Cyto won the prize for "Best future mobile game" on the FlashGamm Kyiv 2012 Game Conference.
