= List of historical video games =

The historical video game belongs to a video game genre in which stories are based upon historical events, environments, or people. Some historical video games are simulators, which attempt an accurate portrayal of a historical event, civilization or biography, to the degree that the available historical research will allow. Other historical video games are fictionalized tales that are based on mythology, legends or a fictional character within a historical setting.

== Panhistorical video games ==
Video games that take place across many periods of history.

Title	Release date	Time period	Notes on setting
Empire Earth	2001	500,000 BC – 2,200 AD (in skirmish mode)/1200s BC – 2098 AD (in Story mode)	A strategy game that spans multiple historical periods, from Prehistoric Age to Space Age.
Ara: History Untold	2024	10,000 BC – 2050s AD	A turn-based grand strategy video game that allows players to build and lead a nation through an alternate history from Stone Age to Singularity Age.
Millennia (video game)	2024	10,000 BC – 2100s AD	A 4X turn-based strategy video game in which players lead their nation through 10 different ages, from Age of Stone to Age of Transcendence.
Empire Earth III	2007	1200s BC – 2100s AD	A sequel in the same vein as the original Empire Earth, covering ancient to modern times.
Empire Earth II	2005	2333 BC – 2070 AD (in Campaign)/50,000 BC – 2,230 AD (in Skirmish mode)	A strategy game that covers thousands of years, from ancient times to futuristic warfare.
Rise of Nations	2003	10,000 BC – 1970 AD	A real-time strategy game where players advance through historical eras, starting from ancient times.
Humankind	2021	10,000 BC – 2020s AD	A turn-based strategy 4X video game where players advance through historical eras, starting from Neolithic Era to Contemporary Era.
Civilization	1991	4,000 BC – 2100 AD	A turn-based strategy 4X video game where players advance through historical eras, starting from Ancient Era to Space Era.
Civilization Revolution	2008	4,000 BC – 2100 AD	A turn-based strategy 4X video game where players advance through historical eras, starting from Antiquity Age, through key historical eras such as the Classical and Renaissance periods, to Modern Age. The game highlights significant historical moments, including early military conquests, the exploration and colonization of new lands, and the development of modern democracies and technology.
Civilization Revolution 2	2014	4,000 BC – 2100 AD	A turn-based strategy 4X video game where players experience history from the foundation of early cities in 4,000 BC through major global historical developments such as the rise of empires, technological revolutions, and global diplomacy.
Civilization III	2001	4,000 BC – 2050 AD	A turn-based strategy 4X video game, where players start in 4,000 BC, founding early cities and expanding into larger empires by navigating historical events such as the Iron Age, the Renaissance, and the Age of Imperialism. The game introduces elements of global trade, colonial expansion, and the development of nation-states, reflecting the broader historical context of human civilization.
Civilization IV	2005	4,000 BC – 2050 AD	A turn-based strategy 4X video game where players guide civilizations through ancient conflicts, the rise of major religions, the formation of powerful empires, and modern global diplomacy. The game emphasizes cultural development, religion, and historical advancements in science and warfare.
Civilization V	2010	4,000 BC – 2050 AD	A turn-based strategy 4X video game where players lead their civilization through ancient empires, the rise of feudal kingdoms, industrial expansion, and modern global politics. The game focuses on the interactions between ancient cultures, world-changing technological advancements like gunpowder and electricity, and global conflicts like the World Wars.
Civilization VI	2016	4,000 BC – 2050 AD	A turn-based strategy 4X video game where players engage with real-world historical figures and events, managing ancient kingdoms, imperialistic expansion, and industrial and digital revolutions. The game emphasizes the geographical and political developments of civilizations, highlighting how cities, technologies, and cultures evolve across eras.
Civilization VI: Rise and Fall	2018	4,000 BC – 2050 AD	This expansion for Civilization VI adds new mechanics that reflect the ebb and flow of civilizations throughout history. Golden ages and Dark Ages mirror real-world historical cycles of prosperity and decline, while governors and loyalty mechanics represent the internal dynamics of historical empires.
Civilization VI: Gathering Storm	2019	4,000 BC – 2050 AD	With a focus on climate change and natural disasters, this expansion emphasizes how human civilizations have impacted and been shaped by their environment. From ancient agricultural practices to industrial pollution, players must navigate environmental challenges while advancing through historical eras.
Civilization VII	2025	4,000 BC – 2050 AD	A turn-based strategy 4X video game where players advance through historical eras, starting from Antiquity and through the Exploration Age, to the Modern Age.
Civilization II	1996	4,000 BC – 2010 AD	A turn-based strategy 4X video game where players encounter significant events such as the rise and fall of empires, the spread of religions, and the Industrial Revolution. They must navigate ancient diplomacy and warfare, and advance through technological, cultural, and societal developments.

== Games set in the Stone Age (before 10,000 BC) ==
Title	Release date	Time period	Notes on setting
Ancestors: The Humankind Odyssey	2019	10,000,000 – 2,000,000 BC	The game is set in prehistoric Africa, allowing players to experience the evolution of the human lineage through the ages.
Far Cry Primal	2016	10,000 BC	Set during the end of the Upper Paleolithic and the beginning of the Mesolithic period, the game explores the conflict between early human tribes in the Oros Valley.
Dawn of Man	2019	10,000 BC	The player guides a prehistoric settlements through different eras, starting from the Paleolithic to the Iron Age.
BC Kings	2008	10,000 BC	A strategy game combining traditional RTS elements with role-playing mechanics set in a prehistoric world.

== Games set in Antiquity and Classical antiquity (10,000 BC – 500 AD) ==
Title	Release date	Time period	Notes on setting
Age of Empires	1997	8000 BC – 476 AD	A classic strategy game covering different ages, from the Stone Age to the fall of the Roman Empire.
Predynastic the Egypt	2016	5000 – 3150 BC	The game is set in Predynastic Egypt, from first settlements to unification of Upper and Lower Egypt.
Egypt: Old Kingdom	2018	3500 – 2140 BC	A strategy game where players build Egypt's first empire, from tribal unification to the establishment of the Old Kingdom.
The Scorpion King: Rise of the Akkadian	2002	3200 – 3000 BC	The game is set during the First Dynasty of Egypt.
Chariots of War	2003	3100 – 1200 BC	A strategy game set in the ancient Near East, covering the historical period from early Mesopotamian civilizations.
Builders of Egypt	2021	3100 – 30 BC	A city-building strategy game that spans from the foundation of the Old Kingdom of Egypt to its annexation by Rome.
Immortal Cities: Children of the Nile	2004	3100 – 30 BC	A city-building game set in ancient Egypt, focusing on the cultural and economic development of the Nile civilizations.
Pharaoh	1999	3000 – 30 BC	A city-building game where players oversee the development of cities in ancient Egypt from the Old Kingdom to Roman times.
Old World	2021	3000 BC – 500 AD	A grand strategy game set during the Bronze and Iron Ages around the Mediterranean and beyond, mixing historical events and characters.
Egypt III	2004	1279 – 1213 BC	Another game in the Egypt series, this one set during the reign of Pharaoh Ramses II.
Emperor: Rise of the Middle Kingdom	2003	2205 BC – 1234 AD	A city-building game set in ancient China, focusing on the rise and fall of dynasties from Xia to Jin.
Zeus: Master of Olympus	2000	2000 – 1000 BC	A city-building game centered on the ancient Greek civilization, with mythological elements.
Age of Mythology	2002	9000 – 1100 BC	A strategy game, set during the mythological age, covering mythological events from Greece, Egypt, Scandinavia and Atlantis, it features major events like the destruction of Atlantis located in Atlantic Ocean and the Trojan War.
Age of Mythology: Tale of the Dragon (DLC)	2016	9000 – 1100 BC	An expansion to the remastered version, introducing a new Chinese mythology campaign.
Age of Mythology: Retold	2024	9000 – 1100 BC	A complete remaster of Age of Mythology, with updated graphics and features.
Pharaonic	2016	1550 – 1525 BC	A sidescrolling RPG set in ancient Egypt during the reign of Ahmosis I, the Red Pharaoh.
Rise of the Argonauts	2008	1300s BC	Based on the myth of Jason and the Argonauts, this action RPG takes place during the Late Bronze Age.
Ancient Conquest: Quest for the Golden Fleece	1999	1300s BC	A strategy game inspired by the mythological journey of Jason and the Argonauts.
Disney's Hercules	1997	1300s BC	A platform game based on Disney's animated adaptation of the myth of Hercules.
Heracles Chariot Racing	2007	1300s BC	A racing game centered around the mythological hero Heracles, featuring chariots.
Kid Icarus: Uprising	2012	1300s BC	An action-adventure game based loosely on Greek mythology, including characters like Pit and Medusa.
Theseus: Journey to Athens	2018	1300s BC	A role-playing adventure game set in ancient Greece, following the journey of Theseus to Athens.
Mytheon	2011	1300s BC	An action RPG heavily influenced by ancient Greek mythology and mythological creatures.
Egypt II: The Heliopolis Prophecy	2000	1360 BC	An adventure game set in ancient Egypt, revolving around the construction of the city of Heliopolis.
Loki	2007	1200s BC – 1500s AD	An action RPG where players control heroes from various mythologies, including ancient Egypt, Greece, and Norse mythology.
Total War: Pharaoh	2023	1205 – 1155 BC	A strategy game, set during the Late Bronze Age collapse, focusing on Egypt and surrounding civilizations. Historical characters like Ramses III, Merneptah, Seti II, Tausret, Amenmesse, Ninurta-apal-Ekur, Adad-shuma-usur and Suppiluliuma II appear in the game.
Total War Saga: Troy	2020	1200 - 1180 BC	A strategy game centered on the events of the Trojan War, blending myth and history.
Warriors: Legends of Troy	2011	1200 BC	An action game set during the Trojan War, based on Homer's Iliad.
Battle for Troy	2004	1200 BC	A strategy game centered around the legendary Trojan War.
Odyssey: The Search for Ulysses	2000	1200 BC	An adventure game based on Homer's Odyssey, focusing on the journey of Ulysses.
Spartan	2004	1200 – 100 BC	A strategy game that covers ancient Greek city-states and their rise and fall, including Sparta.
Egypt 1156 B.C.	1997	1156 BC	An adventure game where the player investigates the theft of a royal tomb in ancient Egypt.
Invictus	2000	1000s BC	A strategy game where players control legendary Greek heroes during ancient times.
CivCity: Rome	2006	756 – 27 BC	A city-building strategy game set in the Roman Republic, with an emphasis on city planning.
Caesar	1992	756 – 27 BC	The first in the Caesar series, pioneering the city-building genre with a focus on managing a Roman city.
Caesar II	1995	756 – 27 BC	A more refined version of the city-building formula with improved mechanics and graphics.
Caesar III	1998	756 – 27 BC	Widely regarded as a classic, known for its detailed city management and historical setting in ancient Rome.
Caesar IV	2006	756 – 27 BC	The first 3D entry in the series, bringing new visual depth and strategic complexity to Roman city-building.
Apotheon	2015	500s BC	A 2D action RPG based on ancient Greek mythology. Players control Nikandreos, a mortal warrior who battles gods and mythological creatures to overthrow Zeus.
Hades	2020	500s BC	An action roguelike game set in the world of Greek mythology. Players take on the role of Zagreus, the son of Hades, as he attempts to escape the underworld. The game features characters from Greek mythology like Zeus, Poseidon, and Persephone, blending mythological storytelling with fast-paced combat.
Immortals Fenyx Rising	2020	500s BC	An open-world action-adventure game set in a stylized version of ancient Greece, where players control Fenyx, a demigod on a quest to rescue the Greek gods from the titan Typhon. The date is according to the dialogue between Zeus and Prometheus from the Immortals Fenyx Rising: Story Trailer, where Zeus is shocked to learn that video games will be invented in 2,500 years.
Immortals Fenyx Rising: A New God (DLC)	2021	500s BC	An expansion to the main game, which focuses on Fenyx's trials to become a god.
Immortals Fenyx Rising: Myths of the Eastern Realm (DLC)	2021	500s BC	An expansion to the main game, that focuses on separate story featuring Chinese mythology.
Immortals Fenyx Rising: The Lost Gods (DLC)	2021	500s BC	An expansion to the main game, that focuses on a top-down adventure featuring new characters.
Rygar: The Legendary Adventure	2002	500s BC	A third-person action-adventure game based loosely on Greek and Roman mythology. Players control Rygar, a warrior equipped with the Diskarmor, as he battles through mythological landscapes to defeat gods and restore peace.
Legion Arena	2005	509 – 27 BC	A tactical role-playing game where players take control of Roman legions, starting from the Roman Republic. The game progresses through various historical campaigns, allowing players to upgrade and manage their troops while fighting in battles inspired by ancient history.
0 A.D.	2018	500 BC – 1 AD, 1 – 500 AD	A free, open-source real-time strategy game that covers ancient civilizations from 500 BC to 500 AD. Players can control various factions such as the Romans, Greeks and Persians, engaging in both economic development and military conquests.
Legion Gold	2002	500 BC – 16 AD	A remastered version of Legion, a turn-based strategy game that covers the rise of the Roman Empire and other ancient civilizations. The game allows players to control multiple factions, from the Romans to the Gauls, and manage both military campaigns and city development.
The History Channel: Great Battles of Rome	2007	500 BC – 16 AD	A historical strategy game where players can relive the major battles of the Roman Republic and Empire.
Hegemony III: Clash of the Ancients	2015	500 – 300s BC	A strategy game set during the ancient Italian wars. The game focuses on the unification of Italy and features campaigns centered around Pyrrhus of Epirus and the struggles between early Roman and Italic states.
Builders of Greece	TBA	500 – 300 BC	An upcoming city-building game where players build and manage a city-state in ancient Greece. The game emphasizes historical accuracy in terms of architecture, politics, and economy, allowing players to shape the development of their city through various historical eras.
Ancient Wars: Sparta	2007	490 – 480 BC	A real-time strategy game set during the Greco-Persian Wars. Players control the armies of Sparta, Persia, and Egypt, recreating historical battles such as the Battle of Thermopylae and the Greco-Persian conflicts.
300: March to Glory	2007	480 BC	An action game follows King Leonidas and his 300 Spartan warriors as they defend Greece from the Persian invasion at the Battle of Thermopylae.
Assassin's Creed Odyssey	2018	480 – 420 BC	The game is set in a vast, open-world recreation of ancient Greece, with locations including Athens, Sparta, and various islands across the Aegean Sea, during the Peloponnesian War.
Assassin's Creed Odyssey: Legacy of the First Blade (DLC)	2018	480 – 420 BC	An expansion to the main game, that focuses on the origins of the Assassin Brotherhood and introduces Darius, the first wielder of the hidden blade.
Assassin's Creed Odyssey: The Fate of Atlantis (DLC)	2019	480 – 420 BC	An expansion to the main game, that explores the mythological side of the Assassin's Creed universe, taking players to the legendary city of Atlantis and introducing gods like Hades and Poseidon.
Total War: Rome II	2013	431 BC – 275 AD	From Peloponnesian War to Crisis of the Third Century of Roman Empire. Real historical figures such as Hannibal, Julius Caesar, Scipio Africanus, Vercingetorix, Octavian Augustus, Cleopatra, Mark Anthony, Pericles and Aurelian appear in the game.
The Lost City of Atlantis	1995	400s BC	An adventure game based on the legend of Atlantis, set in the classical era, where players explore the mythical sunken civilization and uncover its secrets.
Hegemony Gold: Wars of Ancient Greece	2012	400 – 300s BC	Ancient Greece - the campaigns of Philip II of Macedon and the Peloponnesian War between Sparta and Athens
Fate of Hellas	2008	396 – 326 BC	A strategy game focusing on the Greco-Persian conflicts and the campaigns of Alexander the Great in the ancient world.
Imperiums: Greek Wars	2020	359 BC	A turn-based strategy game set in Classical Greece, exploring the power struggles and alliances leading to the rise of Macedon under Philip II.
The Great Battles of Alexander	1997	336 – 323 BC	A tactical game reenacting the famous battles of Alexander the Great.
Alexander: The Heroes Hour	2004	336 – 323 BC	A real-time strategy game portraying the military campaigns of Alexander the Great.
Rome: Total War: Alexander	2006	336 – 323 BC	A campaign-based strategy game centered on Alexander the Great's conquest of the Persian Empire.
Age of Alexander	2009	336 – 323 BC	A strategy game highlighting the military achievements and empire-building of Alexander the Great.
Rise and Fall: Civilizations at War	2006	333 – 30 BC	A strategy-action hybrid game spanning the rise and fall of ancient civilizations, including Greece and Rome.
Alexander	2004	333 – 323 BC	A strategy game based on the 2004 film Alexander, focusing on his military campaigns.
Tin Soldiers: Alexander The Great	2004	333 – 323 BC	A tactical strategy game focused on Alexander the Great's major battles using miniature-style units.
Imperator: Rome	2019	304 – 27 BC	A grand strategy game depicting the politics, warfare, and expansion of ancient Rome and neighboring civilizations.
Spartan: Total Warrior	2005	300 BC	A hack-and-slash action game featuring a Spartan warrior in a fictionalized version of ancient Greece.
Titan Quest|Titan Quest: Immortal Throne	2006	282 BC - after destruction of Colossus of Rhodes	An action RPG where players fight mythical creatures and explore the ruins of the Colossus of Rhodes following its destruction.
Europa Universalis: Rome	2008	280 – 27 BC	A grand strategy game covering the rise of the Roman Republic and neighboring powers.
Aggressors: Ancient Rome	2018	280 BC – 500 AD	A strategy game spanning the Roman Republic, Empire, and its eventual decline.
Centurion: Defender of Rome	1990	275 – 27 BC	A classic strategy game featuring military campaigns and political challenges of the Roman Republic.
Rome: Total War	2004	270 BC – 14 AD	A strategy game focusing on the rise and expansion of the Roman Empire.
Legions of Death	1987	264 – 146 BC	A naval strategy game focusing on sea battles during the Punic Wars.
Walls of Rome	1993	264 – 146 BC	A city-building and siege warfare game set during the Punic Wars.
Nemesis of the Roman Empire	2003	264 – 146 BC	A real-time strategy game depicting the Punic Wars between Rome and Carthage.
Pax Romana	2003	264 – 50 BC	A grand strategy game depicting the political and military struggles of Rome.
God of War: Chains of Olympus	2008	249 - 239 BC	God of war: chains of Olympus takes place 10 years before the events of the original God of War.
Salammbo: Battle for Carthage	2002	241 – 237 BC	A strategy-adventure game set during the Mercenary War in Carthage.
God of War	2005	239 BC	God of War takes place 13 years before the events of the God of War 2
God of War: Ghost of Sparta	2010	239 BC - 226BC	God of War 2 takes place 13 years after the events of the original God of War.This game takes place between the events of God of War and God of War 2.
God of War II	2007	226 BC	An action-adventure game where Kratos battles the Colossus of Rhodes and annihilates Sparta, blending Greek mythology with historical elements.Historically, the Colossus of Rhodes was destroyed in 226 BC.
God of War III	2010	226 BC	An action game starts immediately after the events of God of War 2 take depicting the fall of the Olympia and the decline of Greco-Roman polytheism.
The Great Battles of Hannibal	1997	218 – 201 BC	A tactical game focused on Hannibal's military campaigns against Rome.
Rise of the Phoenix	1993	206 – 202 BC	A strategy game depicting the conflict between the Chu and Han dynasties in ancient China.
Imperivm: Great Battles of Rome	2005	200 – 30 BC	A strategy game featuring historical battles of the Roman Empire.
Gladius	2003	100s BC	A tactical RPG set in the world of gladiatorial combat, where players manage a school of gladiators and compete in arena battles across various regions of the Roman world.
Gods & Heroes: Rome Rising	2011	100s BC	An MMORPG set in ancient Rome, blending historical elements with mythology, where players take on the role of a Roman hero blessed by the gods to fight mythical creatures and enemies of Rome.
Expeditions: Rome	2022	60s BC	A turn-based strategy RPG that follows a young Roman legate rising through the ranks of the Roman army, engaging in military campaigns across Greece, Egypt, and Gaul while shaping Rome's political landscape.
Grand Ages: Rome	2010	60 BC – 9 AD	A city-building and strategy game where players manage and expand Roman cities, dealing with politics, economy, and military conflicts throughout the late Republic and early Empire.
Legionnaire	1982	58 – 45 BC	One of the earliest strategy games set in ancient Rome, focusing on managing Roman legions in battles inspired by Caesar's conquests.
The Great Battles of Caesar	1998	58 – 45 BC	A historical turn-based strategy game that recreates Julius Caesar's military campaigns, including the Gallic Wars and the Roman Civil War.
Praetorians	2003	58 – 45 BC	A real-time strategy game focused on the military campaigns of Julius Caesar, emphasizing tactical warfare and the use of different unit types across the Roman, Gallic, and Egyptian factions.
Hegemony Rome: The Rise of Caesar	2014	50s BC	A real-time strategy game set during Julius Caesar's Gallic Wars, depicting Rome's conquest of Gaul and the resistance of various Celtic tribes, including the rebellion led by Vercingetorix.
Celtic Kings: Rage of War	2002	50 BC	A strategy game set in ancient Gaul during the Roman era.
Assassin's Creed Origins	2017	49 – 44 BC	An action-adventure game set in Egypt during the fall of the Ptolemaic dynasty, featuring historical figures like Cleopatra and Julius Caesar.
Warrior of Rome	1991	48 BC	A strategy game set during the time of Julius Caesar's civil war. Players control Roman legions in various campaigns.
Warrior of Rome II	1992	48 BC	A sequel to Warrior of Rome, continuing the strategic battles of Julius Caesar's campaigns.
Rome: Caesar's Will	2000	44 BC	A historical adventure game focused on the aftermath of Julius Caesar's assassination and the political struggles in Rome.
Shadow of Rome	2005	44 BC	An action-adventure game that fictionalizes the assassination of Julius Caesar. The game follows Agrippa, a Roman centurion, and Octavianus, the future Augustus, in a revenge and political intrigue story.
Teudogar and the Alliance with Rome	2003	27 BC – 14 AD	An RPG in the style of Ultima VII, where players take on the role of a Germanic warrior during the early Roman Empire, navigating alliances and conflicts with Rome.
Glory of the Roman Empire	2006	1 – 100 AD	A city-building strategy game that allows players to construct and manage Roman settlements, ensuring economic and military stability.
Imperium Romanum	2008	1 – 100 AD	A sequel to Glory of the Roman Empire, expanding on city-building mechanics and historical scenarios from the early Roman Empire.
The Forgotten City	2021	1 – 100 AD	A mystery adventure game set in a cursed Roman city, based on a popular Skyrim mod.
Ryse: Son of Rome	2013	58 – 68 AD	An action game following a Roman centurion's life during Nero's reign in an alternate version of ancient Rome.
Nethergate	1998	60 – 61 AD	An RPG set in Roman Britain, exploring the clash between Roman forces and Celtic druids.
Pompei: The Legend of Vesuvius	2000	79 AD	A point-and-click adventure game set in Pompeii just before the eruption of Mount Vesuvius.
Rome: Pathway to Power	1992	92 AD	A strategy-adventure game where the player rises through the ranks of Roman society to achieve power.
Catechumen	2000	100s AD	A Christian-themed first-person shooter set during Roman persecution of Christians.
Circus Maximus: Chariot Wars	2002	100s AD	A racing combat game set in ancient Rome's chariot arenas.
The Gladiators of Rome	2002	100s AD	A strategy game where players train and manage gladiators in ancient Rome.
Age of Gladiators	2016	100s AD	A management simulation game focusing on the life and battles of Roman gladiators.
Age of Gladiators II: Rome	2018	100s AD	A sequel focusing on managing gladiators and arenas in the Roman Empire.
Horrible Histories: Ruthless Romans	2009	101 – 106 AD	An educational game based on the Horrible Histories series, depicting Roman life and military campaigns.
Gladiator: Sword of Vengeance	2003	117 AD	An action game where players seek revenge for a fallen gladiator in the Roman Empire.
Colosseum: Road to Freedom	2005	177 – 192 AD	A gladiator simulation game set during Emperor Commodus' reign.
Gladiator Begins	2010	177 – 192 AD	An action RPG focusing on gladiatorial combat during Emperor Commodus' reign.
Three Kingdoms: Fate of the Dragon	2001	184 – 220 AD	A real-time strategy game set during the Three Kingdoms period in China.
SPQR: The Empire's Darkest Hour	1997	193 – 211 AD	An adventure game set in ancient Rome, where players solve mysteries as a Roman investigator.
Dragon Throne: Battle of Red Cliffs	2002	208 – 209 AD	A real-time strategy game based on the famous Battle of Red Cliffs during the Three Kingdoms period in China.
Price of Persia: The Lost Crown	2024	210s AD	An action-adventure platformer set during the decline of the Parthian Empire, featuring a mix of historical and mythological elements.
Romance of the Three Kingdoms	1985	220 – 280 AD	A strategy series based on the Three Kingdoms period in China, focusing on political and military strategy.
Kessen II	2001	220 – 280 AD	A strategy game inspired by the Three Kingdoms era, blending historical events with fantasy elements.
Total War: Three Kingdoms	2019	220 – 280 AD	A strategy game set during China's Three Kingdoms era, combining turn-based empire management and real-time battles.
Rome: Total War: Barbarian Invasion	2005	363 – 476 AD	An expansion focusing on the late Roman Empire and the barbarian invasions that led to its fall.
Against Rome	2004	400s AD	A real-time strategy game portraying barbarian tribes fighting against the Roman Empire.
Annals of Rome	1986	400s AD	A turn-based strategy game covering the rise and fall of the Roman Empire.
King Arthur	2004	400s AD	A role-playing strategy game inspired by Arthurian legends and late Roman Britain.
Conquests of Camelot: The Search for the Grail	1990	400s AD	An adventure game blending Arthurian legend with historical settings in late antiquity.
Legion: The Legend of Excalibur	2002	400s AD	An action-strategy game based on Arthurian legends with a semi-historical setting.

== Games set in the Post-classical Era (500–1500) ==
Post-classical history era refers to the period from about 500 CE to 1500 CE, roughly corresponding to the European Middle Ages.

Title	Release date	Time period	Notes on setting
Age of Empires II/Age of Empires II: Definitive Edition	1999	394 – 1598	Sequel to the original Age of Empires, Age of Empires II covers a large period of time, from as early as Alaric I to as late as the Battle of Noryang.
Total War: Attila	2015	395 – 814	From Final partition of the Roman Empire and Hunnic Invasion under Attila to rule of Byzantine emperor Justinian I and coronation of Charlemagne
Requital	2006	500s	
Stronghold Legends	2006	516 – 1477	Set in middle-age, gives the player a choice of different starting rulers with different troop types (including King Arthur and his knights of the round table, Count Vlad Dracul, and Siegfried of Xanten)
Silkroad Online	2004	600s	
Quraish	2005	632 – 661	
Crusader Kings 2	2012	769 – 1452	A grand strategy game with a heavy RPG flavor set in medieval Europe, northern Africa and the middle East. Through DLCs the map has also expanded to include India. The game is played from the perspective of a ruler in that time period, changing perspective to the primary heir once the ruler dies. The focus is on building up your house(family).
Hellblade: Senua's Sacrifice	2017	790	
Senua's Saga: Hellblade II	2024	790	
Ancestors Legacy	2018	793 – 1300s	
Dusk of the Gods	1991	793 – 1066	Set in the Viking Age
Heimdall	1991	793 – 1066	Set in the Viking Age
Heimdall 2	1994	793 – 1066	Set in the Viking Age
Kingdoms of England II: Vikings, Fields of Conquest	1992	793 – 1066	Set in the Viking Age
Hammer of the Gods	1994	793 – 1066	Set in the Viking Age
Vikings: The Strategy of Ultimate Conquest	1996	793 – 1066	Set in the Viking Age
Saga: Rage of the Vikings	1998	793 – 1066	Set in the Viking Age
Rune	2000	793 – 1066	Set in the Viking Age
Rune II	2019	793 – 1066	Set in the Viking Age
Thorgal: Curse of Atlantis	2002	793 – 1066	Set in the Viking Age
Medieval: Total War': Viking Invasion	2003	793 – 1066	
Curse of Atlantis: Thorgal's Quest	2003	793 – 1066	Set in the Viking Age
Valhalla Chronicles	2003	793 – 1066	Set in the Viking Age
Besieger	2004	793 – 1066	Set in the Viking Age
Viking: Battle for Asgard	2008	793 – 1066	Set in the Viking Age
Volgarr the Viking	2013	793 – 1066	Set in the Viking Age
War of the Vikings	2014	793 – 1066	Set in the Viking Age
Jotun	2015	793 – 1066	Set in the Viking Age
Northgard	2017	793 – 1066	Set in the Viking Age
Vikings: Wolves of Midgard	2017	793 – 1066	Set in the Viking Age
The Frostrune	2017	793 – 1066	Set in the Viking Age
Bad North	2018	793 – 1066	Set in the Viking Age
Valheim	2021	793 – 1066	Set in the Viking Age
Prince of Persia: The Sands of Time	2003	800s	Set in Persia during the 9th century AD
Prince of Persia: The Forgotten Sands	2010	800s	The game takes place in the seven-year gap between Prince of Persia: The Sands of Time and Prince of Persia: Warrior Within.
Prince of Persia: Warrior Within	2004	800s	Set in Persia during the 9th century AD
Prince of Persia: The Two Thrones	2005	800s	Set in Persia during the 9th century AD
Persian Wars	2001	800s	
Assassin's Creed Valhalla	2020	847 – 886	The game recounts a history of the Viking invasion of Britain, Norse colonization of North America, Viking Expansion in Ireland and Siege of Paris (885–886)
Assassin's Creed Mirage	2023	861	Set in Baghdad during the Islamic Golden Age. Includes events from the Anarchy at Samarra.
Crusader Kings III	2020	867 – 1453	Crusader Kings III is a grand strategy game and dynasty simulator set in the Middle Ages. Players can choose a start date of either 867 or 1066 and play until 1453.
Total War Saga: Thrones of Britannia	2018	878 – 900s	
Cosmology of Kyoto	1993	900s – 1000s	
Brave	2012	900s – 1000s	
God of War(2018)	2018	950	
God of War: Ragnarök/God of War Ragnarök: Valhalla	2022/2023	950s – 1100s	
Cultures	2000	986	
Cultures 2: The Gates of Asgard	2002	986	
For Honor	2017	1000 – 1200s	Players can play as a character from one of four different factions, namely the Iron Legion (Knights), the Warborn (Vikings), the Dawn Empire (Samurai), and the Wu Lin (Ancient Chinese).
Knights of Honor	2004	1000s – 1300s	
Medieval Lords: Build, Defend, Expand	2004	1000s – 1300s	
Rampart (video game)	1990	1000s – 1300s	
Medieval Lords: Soldier Kings of Europe	1991	1028 – 1400s	
Castlevania: Lords of Shadow	2010	1047	The setting of Lords of Shadow is during "the end of days" in the year 1047
Age of Empires IV	2021	1066 – 1453	
Medieval II: Total War	2006	1066 – 1530	From Norman Conquest and Crusades to Inquisition and Age of Discovery
Crusader Kings	2004	1066 – 1452	
Maldita Castilla	2016	1081	
Conqueror A.D. 1086	1995	1086	
Medieval: Total War	2002	1087 – 1453	
Knights of the Temple: Infernal Crusade	2004	1096 – 1099	
Knights of the Temple II	2005	1096 – 1099	
Lords of the Rising Sun	1989	1100s	
Crusaders: Thy Kingdom Come	2009	1100s	
The History Channel: Crusades - Quest for Power	2003	1100s	
Robin Hood: Prince of Thieves	1991	1100s – 1200s	
Robin Hood: Defender of the Crown	2003	1100s – 1200s	
Conquests of the Longbow: The Legend of Robin Hood	1991	1100s – 1200s	
Robin Hood: The Legend of Sherwood	2002	1100s – 1200s	
Empires Apart	2018	1100s – 1300s	
Lords of the Realm	1994	1100s – 1300s	
Lords of the Realm II	1996	1100s – 1300s	
Lords of the Realm III	2004	1100s – 1300s	
Portugal 1111: A Conquista de Soure	2004	1111	
Ken Follett's The Pillars of the Earth	2017	1135 – 1162	The game begins with the option of an interactive tutorial inside a cathedral. It then transitions to the Prologue which is set in Shiring in 1135.
Defender of the Crown	1986	1149	
Medieval II: Total War: Kingdoms	2007	1174 – 1521	From Third Crusade and Northern Crusades to First War of Scottish Independence and Spanish colonization of the Americas
Genji: Dawn of the Samurai	2005	1179 – 1189	
Genji: Days of the Blade	2006	1179 – 1189	
Yoshitsune Eiyūden: The Story of Hero Yoshitsune	2005	1184 – 1189	
Genghis Khan II: Clan of the Gray Wolf	1992	1184 – 1274	
Genghis Khan: Aoki Ookami to Shiroki Mejika IV	1998	1189 – 1370	
The Kings' Crusade	2010	1189 – 1192	
Empires: Dawn of the Modern World	2003	1189 – 1945	
Dante's Inferno	2010	1189 – 1191	The story follows Dante, a Templar knight from the Crusade who (despite his faith) has committed numerous atrocities during the Third Crusade. At the city of Acre, Dante is entrusted to keep a group of Saracen prisoners safe so King Richard I could obtain a holy relic from Saladin.
Assassin's Creed	2007	1191	The plot is set in a fictional history of real-world events and follows the centuries-old struggle between the Assassins, who fight for peace with free will, and the Templars, who desire peace through control. The game primarily takes place during the Third Crusade in the Holy Land in 1191, with the plot revolving around the Secret Order of Assassins, based upon the Hashshashin sect.
Assassin's Creed: Bloodlines	2009	1192	Beginning shortly after the events of the first game, Altaïr Ibn-La'Ahad learns of a plan of the remaining Templars to escape to Cyprus, and so infiltrates one of their strongholds in Acre to stop them from doing so.
The Cursed Crusade	2011	1198 – 1204	Fourth Crusade
Stronghold: Crusader	2002	1100s	
Stronghold Crusader II	2014	1100s	
Stronghold	2001	1200s	
Stronghold 2	2005	1200s	
Stronghold: Warlords	2021	1200s	
Stronghold 3	2011	1200s	
XIII Century	2007	1200s	
Real Warfare 2: Northern Crusades	2011	1200s	
Castles	1991	1200s	
Knights and Merchants: The Shattered Kingdom	1998	1200s	
Mordhau	2019	1200s – 1500s	
Genghis Khan	1987	1206 – 1227	
Pilgrim: Faith as a Weapon	1997	1208	
The Legend of the Prophet and the Assassin	2000	1208	
The Golden Horde	2008	1237 – 1242	
Shogun: Total War: The Mongol Invasion	2001	1274 – 1281	
Ghost of Tsushima	2020	1274	Featuring an open world, it follows a samurai on a quest to protect Tsushima Island during the first Mongol invasion of Japan.
Europa Universalis: Crown of the North aka Svea Rike III	2000	1275 – 1340	Set in Scandinavia.
MediEvil	1998	1286	
The First Templar	2011	1291 – 1307	From Siege of Acre (1291) to Trials of the Knights Templar
Braveheart	1999	1296 – 1305	
The Legend of William Tell	1990	1300s	
Time Gate: Knight's Chase	1996	1300s	
Castle Strike	2004	1300s – 1400s	
Manor Lords	2024	1300s – 1400s	
Bladestorm: The Hundred Years' War	2007	1300s – 1400s	
Murder in the Abbey	2008	1327	
The History Channel: Great Battles Medieval	2011	1337 – 1453	
Two Thrones	2004	1337 – 1490	Set during the Hundred Years' War and the Wars of the Roses.
A Plague Tale: Innocence	2019	1348	In 1348, Amicia de Rune is a 15-year-old Frenchwoman of noble descent who lives in Aquitaine during the Hundred Years' War between England and France.
A Plague Tale: Requiem	2022	1348	
Inquisition	2002	1348	The 3rd person game, is set in 1348 Paris, France, where the main character, a young thief named Matthew, has come to find his riches.
Going Medieval	2026	1353	The game begins in 1353, in an alternate history Britain where most settlements have been wiped out by the Black Death.
For the Glory	2009	1399 – 1819	
American Conquest	2002	1400s – 1800s	
Europa 1400: The Guild	2002	1400s	
The Guild 2	2006	1400s	
The Patrician	1992	1400s	
Aztec: The Curse in the Heart of the City of Gold	1999	1400s	
Patrician II: Quest for Power	2000	1400s	
Patrician III: Rise of the Hanse	2003	1400s	
Patrician IV	2010	1400s	
Theocracy	2000	1400s	
Gold and Glory: The Road to El Dorado	2000	1400s	
Knights of the Cross	2002	1400s	
Potion Craft: Alchemist Simulator	2021	1400s	
Kingdom Come: Deliverance	2018	1403	It is set in the medieval Kingdom of Bohemia, an Imperial State of the Holy Roman Empire, with a focus on historically accurate content.
Kingdom Come: Deliverance II	2025	1403	
Anno 1404	2009	1404	
Europa Universalis II	2001	1419 – 1820	
1428: Shadows over Silesia	2022	1428	
Joan of Arc: Siege & the Sword	1989	1428 – 1431	
Wars and Warriors: Joan of Arc	2004	1428 – 1431	
Jeanne d'Arc	2006	1428 – 1431	
Europa Universalis IV	2013	1444 – 1821	Being a grand strategy game, all nations represented in the game are playable with flavor events existing even for smaller nations. It is possible to continue playing a save from Crusader Kings 2 via a DLC that converts a save in the earlier set game.
Europa Universalis III	2007	1453 – 1821	
War of the Roses	2012	1455 – 1487	Set during the Wars of the Roses.
Assassin's Creed II	2009	1459 – 1499	The main narrative takes place at the height of the Renaissance in Italy during the 15th and early 16th century.
Sengoku	2011	1467	
Sid Meier's Colonization	1994	1492 – 1850	
Europa Universalis	2000	1492	
Exploration	1994	1492	
Conquest of the New World	1996	1493	
The Seven Cities of Gold	1984	1493	

== Games set in the Age of Discovery (1500–1800) ==
Age of Discovery refers to the period from about 1500 to 1800, roughly corresponding to the Early modern period.

Title	Release date	Time period	Notes on setting
Imperialism II: Age of Exploration	1999	1500s	
Uncharted Waters	1990	1500s	
Galleons of Glory: The Secret Voyage of Magellan	1990	1500s	
Gold of the Americas: The Conquest of the New World	1989	1500s	
Nioh 2	2020	1500s	Set in Japan during the late 1500s
Demon Chaos	2005	1500s	
Red Ninja: End of Honor	2005	1500s	
Samurai Warriors	2004	1500s	
Devil Kings	2005	1500s	
Sword of the Samurai	1989	1500s	
Tenchu: Stealth Assassins	1998	1500s	
Anito: Defend a Land Enraged	2003	1500s	
Port Royale: Gold, Power and Pirates	2002	1500s – 1600s	
Port Royale 2	2004	1500s–1600s	
Port Royale 3: Pirates & Merchants	2012	1500s – 1600s	
No Man's Land	2003	1500s – 1700s	
Assassin's Creed: Brotherhood	2010	1500–1507	The main story takes place immediately after the plot of Assassin's Creed II, featuring Assassin Ezio Auditore da Firenze in 16th century Italy and his quest to restore the Assassin order, and destroy his enemies: the Borgia family.
Anno 1503	2002	1503	
Assassin's Creed: Revelations	2011	1511–1512, 1191–1257	Revelations features two other returning protagonists: Altaïr Ibn-La'Ahad in 12th and 13th century Masyaf, and Ezio Auditore da Firenze in 16th century Constantinople.
Pentiment	2022	1518	
Expeditions: Conquistador	2013	1518–1520	
The Secrets of Da Vinci: The Forbidden Manuscript	2006	1522	
Total War: Shogun 2	2011	1540s–1600s	
Kessen III	2004	1550–1590	
Jerusalem: The Three Roads to the Holy Land	2002	1552	
Onimusha: Warlords	2001	1560s	
Nobunaga's Ambition	1986	1560s–1580s	
Touché: The Adventures of the Fifth Musketeer	1995	1562	
Age of Empires III/Age of Empires III: Definitive Edition	2005	1565–1866	
Onimusha 2: Samurai's Destiny	2002	1560	
Kessen	2000	1570s–1603	
Lionheart: Legacy of the Crusader	2003	1588	
Astrologaster	2019	1590s	The game follows Simon Forman in Elizabethan England.
Sekiro: Shadows Die Twice	2019	1600	The game takes place in a fictionalized Japan set during the Sengoku period, and makes strong references to Buddhist mythology and philosophy.
Assassin's Creed: Shadows	2025	1579-1581	Set in 16th-century Japan towards the end of the Sengoku period, during the Azuchi-Momoyama period, including Nobunaga's assault on the Iga province in 1581. The game feature as a central character Yasuke, a black from Portuguese Mozambique who served as a retainer to Oda Nobunaga and become a samurai.
Nioh	2017	1600–1615	Set during a fictionalized version of the year 1600, the plot follows the journeys of William Adams, an Irish sailor named after and inspired by the historic Englishman who became one of the only ever Western samurai.
Shadow Tactics: Blades of the Shogun	2016	1600s–1700s	
Trek to Yomi	2022	1600s–1700s	
Cossacks: European Wars	2001	1600s–1700s	
Cossacks 3	2016	1600s–1700s	
East India Company	2009	1600s–1700s	
Age of Pirates: Caribbean Tales	2006	1600s	
Age of Pirates 2: City of Abandoned Ships	2009	1600s	
Corsairs: Conquest at Sea	1999	1600s	
Cutthroats: Terror on the High Seas	1999	1600s	
Pirate Hunter	2003	1600s	
Tortuga: Two Treasures	2007	1600s	
Sid Meier's Pirates!	2004	1600s	
Betrayer	2014	1600s	Set in colonial Virginia.
Buccaneer	1997	1600s	
Pirates of the Caribbean	2003	1600s	
Raven's Cry	2015	1600s	
Anno 1602	1998	1602	
7 Blades	2000	1650	
High Seas Trader	1995	1650	
Sea Of Thieves	2018	1650–1750	
An Eye for Optical Theory 1666	2023	1666	
Versailles 1685	1997	1685	
Cutthroat Island	1995	1688	
Banishers: Ghosts of New Eden	2024	1695	Set in colonial New England.
Card Shark	2022	1700s	Set in France.
Mir-Mahna	2011	1700s	
Skull & Bones	2022	1700s	
The Case of the Golden Idol	2022	1700s	
Empire: Total War	2009	1700	
Anno 1701	2006	1701	
Call to Arms	1982	1750–1942	
Birth of America	2006	1755–1783	
Rise of Prussia	2010	1756–1763	
Assassin's Creed IV: Black Flag	2013	1715–1722	Golden Age of Piracy
Assassin's Creed Freedom Cry	2013	1735	
Assassin's Creed Rogue	2014	1751–1776	Seven Years' War
Assassin's Creed III	2012	1754–1781	American War of Independence
Assassin's Creed III: Liberation	2012	1765–1777	
Assassin's Creed Unity	2014	1776–1794	French Revolution
China: The Forbidden City	1998	1775	
Age of Sail	1996	1775–1820	
Age of Sail II	2001	1775–1820	
Liberty or Death	1993	1775–1783	
Mozart: The Conspirators of Prague	2009	1788	
Imperial Glory	2005	1789–1815	
Napoleon Senki	1988	1796–1802	
War and Peace: 1796–1815	2002	1796–1815	
Napoleon: Total War	2010	1796–1815	
Pirates of the Barbary Coast	1986	1798	
Cossacks II: Napoleonic Wars	2005	1799–1815	

== Games set in the Modern period (1800–1945) ==
Title	Release date	Time period	Notes on setting
Anno 1800	2019	1800	
Imperialism	1997	1800s	
Alter Ego	2010	1800s	Set in Plymouth, England.
Black Book	2021	1800s	Set in Russia.
Outlaws	1997	1800s	
Ravenous Devils	2022	1800s	
Taipan!	1979	1800s	
This Land Is My Land	2021	1800s	
Wooden Ships and Iron Men	1996	1800–1815	
Return of the Obra Dinn	2018	1807	
March of the Eagles	2013	1805–1820	
Guns of Fort Defiance	1981	1812	
1821: The Struggle for Freedom	2001	1821	
1453–1821: The Coming of Liberation	2008	1821–1830	
Railway Empire	2018	1830-1930	
Railway Empire 2	2023	1830-1930	
Nightmare Creatures	1997	1834	
Victoria: An Empire Under the Sun	2003	1836–1936	
Victoria II	2010	1836–1936	
Victoria 3	2022	1836–1936	
Amnesia: The Dark Descent	2010	1839	
Walden, a game	2017	1845-47	Re-enacts Henry David Thoreau's time living on Walden Pond
The Oregon Trail	1985	1848	
Aviary Attorney	2015	1848	
Gold Rush!	1988	1848	
Square's Tom Sawyer	1989	1855	
Red Dead Revolver	2004	1860s	
Ultimate General: Civil War	2016	1861–1865	
Ultimate General: Gettysburg	2014	1863	
Total War: Shogun 2: Fall of the Samurai	2012	1864–1867	
Call of Juarez: Bound in Blood	2009	1864–1866	A prequel to Call of Juarez, the game follows the adventures of Confederate deserters Ray and Thomas McCall during the search of the legendary Gold of Juarez in Mexico.
Voyage: Inspired by Jules Verne	2005	1865	
3 Skulls of the Toltecs	1996	1866	
Fenimore Fillmore's Revenge	2008	1866	
Inspector Schmidt - A Bavarian Tale	2023	1866	
Like a Dragon: Ishin!	2014	1866	
The Westerner	2003	1866	
Assassin's Creed Syndicate	2015	1868	Victorian London
1869	1992	1869	
Desperados III	2020	1870s	
Rails West!	1984	1870–1900	
America	2000	1870–1900	
Stanley: The Search for Dr. Livingston	1992	1871	
80 Days	2005	1873	
Darkwatch	2005	1876	Set in the Arizona Territory
Way of the Samurai	2002	1878	
ZuluWar!	1996	1879	Anglo-Zulu War
Gun	2005	1880	
Chocolatier	2007	1880	
Colonial Conquest	1985	1880	
Sherlock Holmes Chapter One	2021	1880	
Meitantei Holmes: M-Kara no Chousenjou	1989	1880-1914	Follows the character of Sherlock Holmes, unsure of exact dates.
Sherlock	1984	1880-1914	Follows the character of Sherlock Holmes, unsure of exact dates.
Sherlock Holmes: Hakushaku Reijō Yūkai Jiken	1986	1880-1914	Follows the character of Sherlock Holmes, unsure of exact dates.
Sherlock Holmes: The Mystery of the Frozen City	2012	1880-1914	Follows the character of Sherlock Holmes, unsure of exact dates.
Sherlock Holmes and the Mystery of Osborne House	2010	1880-1914	Follows the character of Sherlock Holmes, unsure of exact dates.
221B Baker Street	1986	1880-1914	Follows the character of Sherlock Holmes, exact dates uncertain.
Young Sherlock: The Legacy of Doyle	1987	1880-1914	Follows the character of Sherlock Holmes, unsure of exact dates.
Doctor Lautrec and the Forgotten Knights	2011	1880s	
The Gene Machine	1996	1880s	
Kim	2016	1880s	
Dust: A Tale of the Wired West	1995	1882	
Sherlock Holmes: The Awakened	2023	1882	
Black Sails: The Ghost Ship	2010	1884	
Call of Juarez	2006	1884	
MediEvil 2	2000	1886	
The Order: 1886	2015	1886	
Sherlock: The Riddle of the Crown Jewels	1987	1887	
Van Helsing	2004	1887	
Dance of Death: Du Lac & Fey	2019	1888	
Jack the Ripper	1987	1888	
The Lost Files of Sherlock Holmes	1992	1888	
Sherlock Holmes Versus Jack the Ripper	2009	1888	
Sherlock Holmes: Consulting Detective	1991	1888-1890	
Sherlock Holmes: Consulting Detective Vol. II	1992	1888-1891	
The Lost Files of Sherlock Holmes: The Case of the Rose Tattoo	1996	1889	
Sherlock Holmes and the Hound of the Baskervilles	2011	1889	
Dead Man's Hand	2004	1890s	
Bram Stoker's Dracula	1993	1890s	
Dracula: Origin	2008	1890s	
Dracula the Undead	1991	1890s	
Heart of Africa	1985	1890s	
A Vampyre Story	2008	1890s	
The Great Ace Attorney: Adventures	2015	1890s-1900s	
The Great Ace Attorney 2: Resolve	2017	1890s-1900s	
Curse: The Eye of Isis	2003	1890	
Jekyll and Hyde	2001	1890	
Sherlock Holmes: Consulting Detective Vol. III	1993	1890	
Sherlock Holmes: The Awakened	2006	1894	
Hunt: Showdown	2019	1895	
Sherlock Holmes: Crimes & Punishments	2014	1895	
Sherlock Holmes Versus Arsène Lupin	2007	1895	
Sherlock Holmes: The Devil's Daughter	2016	1896	
ARIDA: Backland's Awakening	2019	1896	
Sherlock Holmes: The Mystery of the Persian Carpet	2008	1896	
Sherlock Holmes: The Case of the Silver Earring	2004	1897	
The Yukon Trail	1994	1897	
Koudelka	1999	1898	
Maid of Sker	2020	1898	
The Testament of Sherlock Holmes	2012	1898	
Amnesia: A Machine for Pigs	2013	1899	
Dracula Unleashed	1993	1899	
Sherlock Holmes: The Mystery of the Mummy	2002	1899	
Red Dead Redemption 2	2018	1899–1907	The story is set in 1899 in a fictionalized representation of the West, Midwest, and Southern United States and follows outlaw Arthur Morgan.
Aggression – Reign over Europe	2008	1900s–1950s	
Jack the Ripper	2004	1901	
AGON	2003	1903	
Dracula: Resurrection	1999	1904	
Dracula 2: The Last Sanctuary	2000	1904	
The Thaumaturge	2024	1905	
Nostalgia 1907	1991	1907	
Call of Juarez: Gunslinger	2013	1910	
Shadow of the Comet	1993	1910	
The Young Indiana Jones Chronicles	1992	1910s-1920s	
Red Dead Redemption	2010	1911–1914	The Sequel timeline wise to Red Dead Redemption 2
BioShock Infinite	2013	1912	
Mystery of the Mummy	1988	1912	
Titanic: Adventure Out of Time	1996	1912	
Shadow Hearts	2001	1913	
Atlantis: The Lost Empire – Trial by Fire	2001	1914	
The Last Express	1997	1914, 24–27 July	Adventure game set on the Orient Express just before World War 1
Tannenberg	2019	1914	World War I
Wing Nuts: Battle in the Sky	1995	1914	World War I
Valiant Hearts: The Great War	2014	1914–1917	World War I
Kaiserpunk	2025	1918–1950	
Instruments of Chaos starring Young Indiana Jones	1994	1914–1918	World War I
World War One	2008	1914–1918	World War I
Warbirds	1991	1914–1918	World War I
The Great War: Western Front	2023	1914–1918	World War I
The Entente: Battlefields WW1	2003	1914–1918	World War I
Battlefield 1	2016	1915–1918	World War I
Shadow Hearts: Covenant	2004	1915	
Verdun	2015	1916	World War I
Amnesia: The Bunker	2023	1916	Set in July 1916, World War I
Vampyr	2018	1918	
Command HQ	1990	1918–2023	
Daughter of Serpents	1992	1920s	
Draugen	2019	1920s	
Gangbusters	1982	1920s	
Gangster Town	1987	1920s	
Gangsters: Organized Crime	1998	1920s	
A Golden Wake	2014	1920s	
The Hound of Shadow	1989	1920s	
Layers of Fear	2016	1920s	
Omerta – City of Gangsters	2013	1920s	
Post Mortem	2002	1920s	
The Ship	2006	1920s	
The Sinking City	2019	1920s	
Nocturne	1999	1920s–1930s	
Empire of Sin	2020	1920–1933	
Dracula 3: The Path of the Dragon	2008	1920-1942	
SOS	1993	1921	
Call of Cthulhu: Dark Corners of the Earth	2005	1915–1922	Set mostly in the year 1922
Bugsy	1986	1922	
Clive Barker's Undying	2001	1923	
Agatha Christie: Hercule Poirot - The First Cases	2021	1923-1935	
Agatha Christie: Hercule Poirot - The London Case	2023	1923-1935	
The Colonel's Bequest	1989	1925	
Black Mirror	2017	1926	
Codename Eagle	1999	1927	
Cruise for a Corpse	1991	1927	
Necronomicon: The Dawning of Darkness	2000	1927	
Gangsters 2	2001	1928–1929	
Glass Rose	2003	1929	
Shadow Hearts: From the New World	2005	1929	
Rule of Rose	2006	1930	
Nancy Drew: Secret of the Old Clock	2005	1930	
Total Eclipse	1988	1930	
Blues and Bullets	2015	1930s	
Borrowed Time	1985	1930s	
Call of the Sea	2020	1930s	
Calvino Noir	2015	1930s	
Chicago 1930	2003	1930s	
Crimson Skies: High Road to Revenge	2003	1930s	
Heart of China	1991	1930s	
Indiana Jones Adventure World	2011	1930s	
Indiana Jones and His Desktop Adventures	1996	1930s	
Indiana Jones in the Lost Kingdom	1984	1930s	
Indiana Jones in Revenge of the Ancients	1987	1930s	
Jack Orlando	2001	1930s	
Mafia	2002	1930s	
Mob Enforcer	2004	1930s	
Prisoner of Ice	1995	1930s	
Agatha Christie: Peril at End House	2007	1932	
Agatha Christie: Murder on the Orient Express	2006	1934	
Agatha Christie - Murder on the Orient Express	2023	1934	
American Girl: Kit Mystery Challenge!	2008	1934	
American Girl: Kit - A Tree House of My Own	2008	1934	
Indiana Jones and the Emperor's Tomb	2003	1935	
Indiana Jones and the Temple of Doom	1985	1935	
Indiana Jones and the Temple of Doom	1988	1935	
Indiana Jones' Greatest Adventures	1994	1935-1938	
Lego Indiana Jones: The Original Adventures	2008	1935-1938	
Lego Indiana Jones 2: The Adventure Continues	2008	1935-1957	
Agatha Christie: The ABC Murders	2009	1936	
Agatha Christie: The ABC Murders	2016	1936–1955	
The Godfather	2006	1936	
Lost Horizon	2010	1936	
Murder on the Zinderneuf	1983	1936	
Raiders of the Lost Ark	1982	1936	
Ripley's Believe It or Not!: The Riddle of Master Lu	1995	1936	
Hearts of Iron	2002	1936–1948	World War II
Hearts of Iron II	2005	1936–1948	World War II
Hearts of Iron III	2009	1936–1948	World War II
Hearts of Iron IV	2016	1936–1948	World War II
The Secrets of Atlantis: The Sacred Legacy	2006	1937	
Agatha Christie: Death on the Nile	2008	1937	
Amnesia: Rebirth	2020	1937	
Crimson Skies	2000	1937	
Indiana Jones and the Great Circle	2024	1937	
Spirit of Speed 1937	1999	1937	
Deadfall Adventures	2013	1938	
Indiana Jones and the Last Crusade	1991	1938	
Indiana Jones and the Last Crusade: The Action Game	1989	1938	
Indiana Jones and the Last Crusade: The Graphic Adventure	1989	1938	
Agatha Christie: And Then There Were None	2005	1939	
Indiana Jones and the Fate of Atlantis	1992	1939	
Indiana Jones and the Staff of Kings	2009	1939	
Noir: A Shadowy Thriller	1996	1940	
The Saboteur	2009	1940	World War II
Brothers in Arms: Art of War	2008	1940s	World War II
Brothers in Arms DS	2007	1940s	World War II
Brothers in Arms: Hour of Heroes	2008	1940s	World War II
Brothers in Arms 2: Global Front	2010	1940s	World War II
Company of Heroes 2	2013	1940s	World War II
Company of Heroes 3	2023	1940s	World War II
Hell Let Loose	2021	1940s	World War II
Red Orchestra: Ostfront 41-45	2006	1940s	World War II
Secret Weapons Over Normandy	2003	1940s	World War II
Battlefield V	2018	1940–1945	World War II
Call of Duty: WWII	2017	1940–1945	
Enemy Front	2014	1940–1945	
Soldiers: Heroes of World War II	2004	1940–1945	World War II
Faces of War	2006	1940–1945	
Men of War	2009	1940–1945	
Axis & Allies	2004	1940–1945	
Agatha Christie: Evil Under the Sun	2007	1941	
Battlestations: Midway	2007	1941–1942	
Battlestations: Pacific	2009	1941–1945	
Call of Duty: Vanguard	2021	1941–1944	
1942: Joint Strike	2008	1942	
Bomber Crew	2017	1942	
Call of Duty: World at War	2008	1942	
Medal of Honor: Allied Assault	2002	1942	
Sniper Elite III	2014	1942	
Battlefield 1943	2009	1943	
Sniper Elite 4	2017	1943	
Brothers in Arms: D-Day	2006	1944	
Brothers in Arms: Double Time	2008	1944	
Brothers in Arms: Earned in Blood	2005	1944	
Brothers in Arms: Hell's Highway	2008	1944	
Brothers in Arms: Road to Hill 30	2005	1944	
Brothers in Arms 3: Sons of War	2014	1944	
Call of Duty 3	2006	1944	
D-Day	2004	1944	
Martha Is Dead	2022	1944	Set in Italy against the backdrop of World War II.
Order of War	2009	1944	
Sniper Elite 5	2022	1944	
Steel Division: Normandy 44	2017	1944	
Steel Division 2	2019	1944	
Company of Heroes	2006	1944	
Fran Bow	2015	1944	
Sniper Elite	2005	1945	
Sniper Elite V2	2012	1945	

== Games set in the Contemporary Era (1945–2025) ==
The current period that corresponds to the Atomic Age, Space Age and the Information Age.

Title	Release date	Time period	Notes on setting
Mafia II	2010	1945–1951	
L.A. Noire	2011	1947	Set in 1947 Los Angeles post-WW2, the game follows detective Cole Phelps's rise among the ranks of the Los Angeles Police Department as he solves a range of cases across various bureaus.
Indiana Jones and the Infernal Machine	1999	1947	
Agatha Christie: Dead Man's Folly	2009	1956	
Agatha Christie: 4:50 from Paddington	2010	1957	
The Godfather II	2009	1958	
BioShock 2	2012	1958-1968	
BioShock	2007	1960	
Call of Duty: Black Ops	2010	1961-1968	Main Events: Bay of Pigs Invasion, Assassination of John F. Kennedy, Vietnam War - Tet Offensive, Laotian Civil War during the Cold War. The game's single-player campaign follows CIA operative Alex Mason as he attempts to recall specific memories in order to locate a numbers station set to instruct Soviet sleeper agents to deploy chemical weapons across the United States.
Mafia III	2016	1968	
American Girl: Julie Finds a Way	2007	1974	
American Girl: Julie Saves The Eagles	2007	1974	
Shadows of Doubt	2024	1979	
Call of Duty: Black Ops Cold War	2020	1981	Main Events: Iran hostage crisis, Fracture Jaw, MKUltra, Presidency of Ronald Reagan, Set in 1981, Black Ops Cold War's single-player story follows CIA operative Russell Adler and his team of agents as they hunt down a Soviet spy named Perseus, the code name of a hypothetical Soviet atomic spy that would have been instrumental for the Soviets in the development of nuclear weapons.
Grand Theft Auto: Vice City	2002	1986	Set in 1986 within the fictional Vice City (based on Miami and Miami Beach), the single-player story follows mobster Tommy Vercetti's rise to power after being released from prison and becoming caught up in an ambushed drug deal. The game contains vehicles, picture of Ronald Reagan shooting a picture of Mikhail Gorbachev and radio channels with music from the 1980s (Michael Jackson, Daryl Hall & John Oates, Iron Maiden).
Call of Duty: Black Ops II	2012	1986-2025	Main Events: Angolan Civil War, Soviet–Afghan War and United States invasion of Panama during the First Cold War; Rare earths trade dispute and Yemeni civil war (2014–present) during Second Cold War
Call of Duty: Black Ops 6	2024	1991	Dissolution of the Soviet Union and Gulf War
Grand Theft Auto: San Andreas	2004	1992	The narrative is based on multiple real-life events in Los Angeles, including the Bloods and Crips street gang rivalry, 1990s crack epidemic, 1992 Los Angeles riots, and Rampart scandal.
Grand Theft Auto III	2001	2001	Set within the fictional Liberty City (loosely based on New York City), the story follows Claude, a silent protagonist who, after being left for dead by his girlfriend during a robbery, embarks on a quest for revenge leading him to become entangled in a world of crime, drugs, gang warfare, and corruption. The game was delayed following the September 11 attacks to allow the team to change references and gameplay deemed inappropriate. President Bush is featured in a report by the Liberty Tree titled 'The W' to Drop in on Liberty City on February 1, 2001
Medal of Honor	2010	2002	Takes place during the War in Afghanistan, loosely based on parts of Operation Anaconda; specifically, the events surrounding the Battle of Roberts Ridge.
Six Days in Fallujah	2023	2004	Set in the Second Battle of Fallujah of the Iraq War over the span of six days in November 2004,
Grand Theft Auto IV	2008	2008	Grand Theft Auto IV takes place in 2008, within a redesigned version of Liberty City. Initially, bridges are locked down due to a terrorist threat, and police constantly pursue players if the bridges are crossed. Niko Bellic, a Serbian ex-soldier, arrives in Liberty City aboard a cargo ship to escape his criminal past, pursue the American Dream, and search for the man who betrayed his unit to an ambush during Yugoslav Wars (ten years prior).
Grand Theft Auto V	2013	2013	Grand Theft Auto V follows three protagonists—retired bank robber, street gangster and drug dealer and gunrunner, and their attempts to commit heists while under pressure from a corrupt government agency and powerful criminals. Players freely roam San Andreas's open world countryside and fictional city of Los Santos, based on post-modernist Los Angeles after Great Recession.
Grand Theft Auto VI	2026	2026	Grand Theft Auto VI is set within the fictional open world state of Leonida—based on Florida—and its Miami-inspired Vice City, the story is expected to follow the criminal duo of Lucia and her male partner. The game world parodies contemporary American culture, with satirical depictions of social media and influencer culture, and references to Internet memes such as Florida Man.

== See also ==
- Lists of video games
- List of World War II video games
- List of Vietnam War games
