= Byzantine (video game) =

1997 video game

Byzantine: The Betrayal
- Developers: Discovery Channel Multimedia, Stormfront Studios
- Publisher: Discovery Communications
- Platform: Windows
- Release: September 1997
- Genres: Adventure, education

Byzantine: The Betrayal is a video game, released September 30, 1997 for Microsoft Windows.

== Gameplay ==
The game consists of a series of 360º screens ala Zork Nemesis, with live actors and photo realistic backgrounds. 16-bit models were designed to be placed into the backdrops for plot twists and puzzles. 45 minutes of live action footage was shot on location in Turkey.

== Plot ==
The protagonist is an American journalist who travels to Turkey to chase an exclusive scoop, and ends up being caught up in a murder mystery. Your friend tells you to travel to the country, and when you arrive you are told by police that the friend isn't as innocent as you first thought, and that by proxy you are under suspicion of smuggling priceless artifacts out of the country. Their journey takes them to virtual reconstructions of historic locations such as Aya Sofya, Suleymaniye Mosque, and the Archaeological Museum.

== Development ==
Byzantine was the first title in the planned Planet Explorer series by Discovery Channel. This series offered a range of cultural experiences from TV to gaming to online expeditions The tie-in television special to this game (by Enterprise Studios) was called Intrigue in Istanbul. The tie-in online expedition was called Selam: The Secret Language.

Serious Games and Edutainment Applications asserts that the flagship game in "cultural entertainment", Versailles 1685, paved the way for other historical video games such as this, as well as China: The Forbidden City, Egypt 1156 B.C.: Tomb of the Pharaoh, Pilgrim: Faith as a Weapon, Rome: Caeser's Will, and Vikings.

According to Byzantine executive producer Harry Moxley, it took the team 16 months to produce the game, during which time they travelled throughout Turkey with the government's permission, and captured rolls of pictures and tapes of anything of interest from vehicles to museums to religious buildings. The team hired Turkish soap star actors to record lines for the game, despite many of them barely being able to speak English.

According to Byzantine artist Martin Servante, the project went through a crisis situation during the completion of one of the levels.

J.D. Sussman, vice president of Enterprise Studios, said: "the techniques and tools we've had to use to convert the Byzantine title from CD-ROM to DVD-ROM are all new. We have had to come up with custom solutions and this title has paved the way to develop solutions for other titles that follow."

Package design for the DVD was done by Zimmerman Crowe Design. The game was released in the United States in Oct, 1997. In Germany, the game was distributed by Egmont Interactive GmbH, was re-dubbed into German by voice recording company Tonsynchron, and was released in 1998. The game was also dubbed and subtitled into Castilian.

== Reception ==
The game has a rating of 75.17% on GameRankings based on 6 reviews.

Skinny Minnie of Tap Repeatedly wrote that the soundscape consisted of ethnic Turkish-sounding strings and percussion. Just Adventure appreciated that the sex of the protagonist remains undefined. Adventure Classic Gaming felt that the game provided a satisfactory simulation of a tour through Byzantine (modern day Constantinople). Przygodoskop thought the game provided both an interesting and entertaining mystery. Game Revolution thought the narrative was engrossing yet convoluted at parts. Gamespot was impressed by the game's seamless blending of "Muslim and Christian religions" with "modern and conservative cultures". Metzomagic noted that the player is able to die throughout the game, so recommended the player keep autosave open.

Byzantine was a finalist for the Software Publishers Association's 1997 "Best Adventure/Role-Playing Software Game" Codie award, which ultimately went to Diablo. It was also nominated in the "Best Overall Multimedia Production" and "Best Use of Visual Arts in Multimedia" categories. Similarly, the Computer Game Developers Conference nominated Byzantine for its 1998 "Best Adventure/RPG" Spotlight Award, but this went ultimately to Final Fantasy VII.

=== Awards and nominations ===
Year	Nominee / work	Award	Result
1998	Byzantine: The Betrayal	International EMMA Award for Best Entertainment Title - Adult	Won
1998	Byzantine: The Betrayal	International EMMA Award for Best Adventure/Fantasy Game	Won
1998	Byzantine: The Betrayal	International EMMA Gold Award for Excellence	Won
