= Medieval (video game) =

1998 video game

- Developer(s): Incredible Simulations
- Release: 1998

Medieval is a 1998 computer wargame developed and published by Incredible Simulations.

== Development ==
Medieval was developed at Incredible Simulations by Jeff Lapkoff, the company's owner and primary employee. He created the majority of the game by himself. It carries over interface design elements from Incredible's earlier ZuluWar! (1996).

== Reception ==
Reception

Review score
Publication	Score
PC Gamer (US)	90%

According to William R. Trotter of PC Gamer US, Medieval won positive reviews from critics and "gained a passionate cult following." It was Incredible Simulations' most successful game at the time, which helped to establish the company financially.
