= Victoria 3 =

2022 video game

- Developer: Paradox Development Studio
- Publisher: Paradox Interactive
- Director: Martin "Wiz" Anward
- Designer: Mikael Andersson
- Engine: Clausewitz Engine
- Platforms: Windows; macOS; Linux
- Release: 25 October 2022
- Genres: Grand strategy
- Modes: Single-player, multiplayer

Victoria 3 is a 2022 grand strategy video game developed by Paradox Development Studio and published by Paradox Interactive. It is a sequel to the 2010 game Victoria II and was released on 25 October 2022.

== Gameplay ==
Victoria 3 spans world history leading up to, during and following its namesake, the Victorian era, from 1836 to 1936, and allows the player to control any one of over 100 countries that existed during that time period. The game, however, does not allow players to control all regions in the game, as many of these are made up of what the game calls "decentralized nations", that typically represent regions inhabited by tribes lacking a central government.

The game focuses on politics, demographics, and economic development, with gameplay focusing on appealing to and appeasing interest groups, who represent various social groups with different ideologies such as the Devout, Industrialists, and Rural Folk to name a few. The game presents a Marxist view of history as political affiliation is based on economic status, with designer Mikael Andersson stating, "It's no secret that Victoria 3 is in many ways the Historical Materialism Simulator."

Though it can be considered a sandbox title, the main goal of the game is to modernize the controlled nation through industrialization. This is achieved chiefly through building mines and factories throughout the player's nation and increasing the capacity for construction. Supplemental mechanics towards this goal include trading on the world market, researching important technologies such as the Atmospheric Engine, and introducing liberal laws such as Free Trade and Laissez-Faire.

Another system in the game is Diplomatic Plays, which borrows heavily from Victoria II's crisis system. When attempting to force other countries to concede land or open markets, players will present a target country with a demand detailing what they desire, which will result in the target country having the opportunity to demand concessions from the aggressor. Following this exchange of demands, a timer will begin counting down as both sides have a chance to mobilize troops and attract potential allies by offering spoils or obligations. If no diplomatic resolution is reached before the timer runs out, war will be declared. Designer Mikael Andersson explained that this system was designed with the intent to tone down the role of warfare by making diplomacy equally as capable. The aforementioned decentralized nations, however, cannot be targeted by diplomatic plays and are primarily interacted with via colonization, which slowly absorbs the decentralized into the colonizing nation.

== Development ==
In the lead up to the game's announcement, Victoria 3 was seen as a meme by the Paradox fanbase due to players constantly asking about it, only to be ignored, with many joking that it would never see a release or that any mention of the number "three" from an official Paradox source meant that the game was on the way. The game was announced on 21 May 2021.

Martin "Wiz" Anward served as director of the game's development. In April 2022, a beta version of the game was leaked online. Victoria 3 was released on 25 October 2022.

=== Downloadable content ===
DLC timeline
2023	Voice of the People
2023	Colossus of the South
2024	Sphere of Influence
2024	Pivot of Empire
2025	Charters of Commerce
2025	National Awakening
2025	Iberian Twilight
2026	The Great Wave
2026	State and Revolution
2027	Century of Strife

Name	Accompanying patch	Type	Release date	Description
Volume 1
Voice of the People	1.3 "Thé à la menthe"	Immersion Pack	22 May 2023	Introduced the "historical agitators" system and overhauls France with new mechanics and decisions based on its long nineteenth century.
Colossus of the South	1.5 "Chimarrão"	Region Pack	14 November 2023	Added unique events and mechanics related to the recovery of South American countries after their wars of independence.
Sphere of Influence	1.7 "Kahwah"	Expansion	24 June 2024	Added new mechanics for diplomacy with a focus on the formation of power blocs that protect regional interests, investments in foreign economies, and interference in the politics of subjects.
Pivot of Empire	1.8 "Masala Chai"	Immersion Pack	21 November 2024	Focused on the Indian subcontinent and the events following years of discrimination and suppression by the East India Company.
Volume 2
Charters of Commerce	1.9 "Lady Grey"	Mechanics Pack	17 June 2025	Reworked the trade, company, and treaty systems.
National Awakening	1.10 "Kaffee"	Immersion Pack	23 September 2025	Added new content related to the Austrian Empire, the Great Eastern Crisis, and the prelude to the Balkan Wars.
Iberian Twilight	1.12 "Chá de Tília"	Immersion Pack	11 December 2025	Added content for the tumultuous times of the 19th century Iberia, as well as the countries and regions in their sphere of influence such as Cuba, the Philippines, Hispaniola, and Morocco.
Volume 3
The Great Wave	1.13 "Matcha"	Expansion	28 April 2026	Added content for Japan; including the Sakoku period and the Meiji Restoration; as well as overhauling the navy system in general.
State and Revolution	1.15 "Ivan-Chai"	Immersion Pack	5 November 2026	Russia and revolutions update.
Century of Strife		Immersion Pack	Q1 2027	China and government update.

== Reception ==
Reception

Aggregate score
Aggregator	Score
Metacritic	83/100

Review scores
Publication	Score
Destructoid	9.5/10
Eurogamer	Recommended
IGN	8/10
PC Gamer (US)	84/100
PCGamesN	8/10

Victoria 3 received "generally favorable reviews" according to review aggregator Metacritic.

Destructoid enjoyed the new tutorial, feeling it intuitively taught players game mechanics and "nearly all concepts that you [would] come into contact with during your time in Victoria".

PC Gamer praised the new economic systems, saying it led players to use real world strategies, and adding: "You can run a deficit for a few years, then build up a reserve, or nearly bankrupt yourself fighting world wars before entering years of austere recovery".

IGN criticized Victoria 3's new war mechanics, stating: "I respect Victoria 3's decision not to focus on war [...] But that doesn't change the fact that armed conflicts can be very fiddly and confusing".

PCGamesN, among other things, liked the overhauled colonialization system, stating: "Victoria 3's colonisable regions are controlled by indigenous people [...] it allows for colonised people to be granted independence and then played as a sovereign nation for the rest of the game".

Eurogamer praised the economic mechanics for their realism and depth. They wrote: "Victoria 3's economic simulation is utterly absorbing, generating a constantly fluctuating challenge of fathoming which industries need what and how to get it to them at a price that doesn't bankrupt them. It's astonishingly reactive, too. Sometimes you'll implement a new production technique across a particular industry, and your economy will take off like a rocket".

Kotaku disliked the economic micromanagement, saying "it also started to get a bit dull once the routine of Victoria 3 set in".

=== Accolades ===
Year	Award	Category	Result	Ref
2022	The Game Awards	Best Sim/Strategy Game	Nominated	
2022	The Steam Awards	Best Game You Suck At	Nominated	

== See also ==
- List of grand strategy video games
- List of Paradox Interactive games
- List of historical video games
