= Opening Night (video game) =

1995 video game

- Developer: MECC
- Publisher: MECC
- Platforms: Windows, Macintosh
- Release: 1995
- Genre: Education/simulation

Opening Night is a 1995 education/simulation video game by MECC, and developed in cooperation with The Children's Theatre Company in Minneapolis. It is aimed at children aged 10 and up.

== Gameplay ==
Players create, direct, and perform mystery plays in a lifelike theatre, featuring The Children's Theatre Company actors in period costumes. They do this by manipulating multimedia including 40 actors, 100 sets, and 300 props to create stories. Lighting, music, and sound effects can be later added. To access an item, players first choose the Category Viewer to choose the category, then next the Item Viewer to choose the item. Double-clicking on the item places it onto the stage. The game was curriculum-driven; it aimed to allow students to use their creativity to write scripts and create plays for assessments, and to use their imagination.

A timer helps synchronise actions, while the recorder is used to capture action. Text-to-speech technology allows the player to hear the character say what they have written, but if words are mispronounced they are encouraged to type the words out phonetically instead. Star Tribune commented that the dialogue can either appear at the bottom of the screen like movie subtitles, or spoken in a "Stephen Hawking monotone".

== Development ==
The actors were added by first being filmed or photographed then digitized into the game, in a similar vein to Mortal Kombat.

A bonus expansion pack named Opening Night Behind the Scenes was released in 1995 on Windows 3.1 and Macintosh. It was developed in cooperation with The Children's Theatre Company in Minneapolis and published by MECC. The disk illustrated how the game was made and showed how a theatre operates. Players could watch interviews by industry professionals from The Children's Theatre Company and look up terms in a glossary. The CD also include Quicktime movies showing tours of different aspects of the theatre.

== Release ==
Dale LaFrenz, MECC president and chief executive officer, commented that she expected Opening Night, alongside MayaQuest and Math Munchers Deluxe, to be released in time for the pre-holiday selling season of 1995.

The game was the 73rd best-selling title during the November–December 1995 period (holiday season).

== Critical reception ==
Star Tribune positively compared MECC's Opening Night (1995) to The Learning Company's The American Girls Premiere (1997), which the newspaper considered to be a mere repackaging of the MECC video game. While The American Girls Premiere offered players the ability to record their own voices, Star Tribune otherwise considered it to be redundant to the earlier game, and thought Opening Night's fans would find the newer title unnecessary. The Washington Post thought the game would only appeal to fully-fledged theatre enthusiasts, while turning off more casual creative types. Macs For Teachers described the product as "very cool".

William T. Yates of The School House Review and World Village gave the game 5 out of 5 stars, commenting that the game would increase players' interest in and love of the theatre. Anne Bubnic of Pep Holiday Hits thought the game was for "aspiring actors and actresses", and chose it as one of the best picks for the holiday season. Gamervescent, for which Opening Night was their first video game, wrote retrospectively that over time they learnt that the title unleashed the "greatest unintentional hilarity of all time". Theatre in Cyberspace wrote that the game was elegant and that it could be more directly applied to the classroom.

A series of plays from the game have been uploaded to YouTube.

== See also ==
- The American Girls Premiere, a theatrical simulation computer game built upon the same engine.
