= The American Girls Premiere =

1997 video game

- Cover art for the 2nd Edition release
- Developer: The Learning Company
- Publisher: The Learning Company
- Series: American Girl
- Platforms: Microsoft Windows; Mac OS
- Release: NA: September 16, 1997; NA: 1998 (2nd Edition)
- Genre: Educational

The American Girls Premiere is an educational computer game developed and published by The Learning Company for American Girl. The game allows players to create theatrical productions featuring characters from American Girl's Historical collection, along with scenes and other elements unique to each of the girls' respective time periods.

It is the first installment of the American Girl series, and so far the only one to date to be released on Mac OS; subsequent personal computer titles in the series were released for Windows. The American Girls Premiere was later followed by The American Girls: Dress Designer, a paper doll-based software toy released by Mattel Interactive in 1999.

== Gameplay ==
Screenshot featuring a typical theatrical production from the game. In this scene, the girls greet their teacher Miss Manderly as they start their embroidery lesson.

Built upon the earlier MECC game Opening Night, The American Girls Premiere allows the creation and direction of unique stage plays starring the historical characters, from Felicity Merriman, representing the American Revolution, to Molly McIntire, daughter of an army doctor during World War II, alongside supporting characters from each of the girls' story arcs.

After selecting a character, players are presented with a stage to which plays are created or presented, utilizing a drag-and-drop interface to add actors, props, lighting and other elements to the scene. Digitized sprites taken from live actors and props from American Girl's historical collection are used throughout the game, à la-Mortal Kombat. Each of the characters have their own set of outfits based on the historical era their stories take place in, e.g. long gowns and petticoats for Felicity or argyle sweaters and blouses for Molly, along with scenarios from their respective time period. Players can also add dialogue in their productions, either through a voice recording, or using the built-in text-to-speech feature. The game develops skills in storytelling and writing, and is open-ended in nature, allowing the player to create theatrical productions as desired, though the limited selection of characters, props and settings may present creative constraints to some players.

In addition to the main game, bonus content such as a tutorial application and a sampler called the Director's Guide is included for players to get acquainted with the game's mechanics and user interface, along with a behind-the-scenes look on production as well as historical facts and commentary on American history and culture, and backstories for each of the characters.

== Development ==
The game marked the debut of Pleasant Company – the creator of the American Girl franchise – into the digital software space. Linda Ehrmann, vice president of Internet business strategy consulting firm Grey Interactive, said that the video game had a due potential as it was entering a relatively untapped market, commenting that in the interactive media space, "girls are for the most part totally ignored".

The game could be bought from major software retailers or ordered directly from The Learning Company or American Girl.

== Release ==
A "Special Edition Collector's Set" of the title was double the price, and in addition to the CD-ROM, it came with: "a keepsake tin, a one-year club membership, a club handbook, a membership card, a baseball cap and six bi-monthly issues of the club newspaper".

An update to the game subtitled 2nd Edition was released in 1998, adding Josefina Montoya to the roster in line with the doll's debut. The 2nd Edition release is a stand-alone expansion containing characters and scenes from the first release, and does not require a copy of the original game to play. The Collector's Set was later updated to include the Josefina-specific content from the 2nd Edition, though it is missing the American Girls Club membership kit.

List of The American Girls Premiere editions
Features	Original release	2nd Edition	Special Edition Collector's Set (1st Edition)	Special Edition Collector's Set (2nd Edition)
The game	Yes	Yes	Yes	Yes
Exclusive packaging	No	No	Yes (collector's case)	Yes (collector's case)
In-game content
Josefina Montoya content pack	No	Yes	No	Yes
Physical content
Club membership	No	No	Yes	No
Handbook	No	No	Yes	No
Membership card	No	No	Yes	No
Newsletter	No	No	Yes	No
Baseball cap	No	No	Yes	Yes
Trading cards	No	No	No	Yes

== Reception ==
=== Critical reception ===
The American Girls Premiere was released to mostly positive reception, with praise being given for providing children a "creative outlet"; a number of reviewers however criticized the user interface to be intimidating and complicated. Children's software review site SuperKids noted that "those who chose to spend time with the program were delighted with their creations". Lisa Karen Savignano of AllGame also noted the game's steep learning curve and limited selection of scenarios and props for authoring stage productions, but gave American Girls Premiere a largely positive review: "I think any girl would be entertained by this and it may start them on the road to creating not just plays, but stories and art of their own". Kevin Mukhar of Computer Shopper thought the game would provide hours of open-ended play to young girls ages 7–12 who liked the American Girl franchise. A reviewer from The Wisconsin State Journal praised the game for being "historically accurate", easy to use, and providing players with "limitless creativity". The Buffalo News commented that the title wouldn't appeal to the "easily bored" or "readily frustrated", but that it would thrill players who were willing to invest both the time and energy. The Capital Times praised the artwork as "rich and detailed", and noted that the interface was user-friendly. Playthings deemed it a "winner". Clint Basinger of Lazy Game Reviews also criticized Premiere's similarity to Opening Night and what he saw as limited educational value, but praised its appeal to fans of the American Girl franchise, calling it a "neat little program" and a "fascinating industry case study" on video games aimed at girls and repackaging an existing product to drive sales through the use of a licensed property.

Many reviewers noted that The American Girls Premiere was a prime example of video games targeted at the female demographic. Deborah Porterfield of the Chicago Sun-Times described the title as "for girls" and "girl-oriented". The Buffalo News suggested that the game was "at the top of many girls' Christmas wish lists". Citing this title as an example, The Boston Globe reviewer Joann Muller suggested that while the video game industry had begun to make commercially successful titles that appealed to the female demographic, the rushed targeting of games directly to girls could "perpetuate gender stereotypes" and "[not] teach girls anything of value about computers". The Buffalo News thought this game was the first "girl-targeted software" from The Learning Company, a company that had built its catalogue from "gender-neutral educational software". Rocky Mountain News reported that Children's Software Revue gave the title a "tentative endorsement" due to offering a "female spin" to traditional video game genres such as adventure.

=== Sales ===
In December 1997, the game "achieved the highest monthly dollar and unit sales of any single product" in the history of The Learning Company up to that point. In March 1998, The Boston Globe said the girls' category of the video game market was "exploding" with titles such as Barbie Fashion Designer (by Mattel), The American Girls Premiere, Let's Talk About Me (by Simon & Schuster Interactive) and Rockett's New School (by Purple Moon). In July, The Buffalo News reported that The Learning Company had captured 20.3% of the girl video game market with this video game.

=== Accolades ===
The game was nominated for "PC Creativity Title of the Year" during the AIAS' inaugural Interactive Achievement Awards and won a Gold Award from the Parents' Choice Foundation. The game also won a Mom's Choice Software award for Fall 1997, and a 1998 selection in American Library Association's Great Interactive Software for Kids List.
