= Kim (novel) =

1901 picaresque novel by Rudyard Kipling

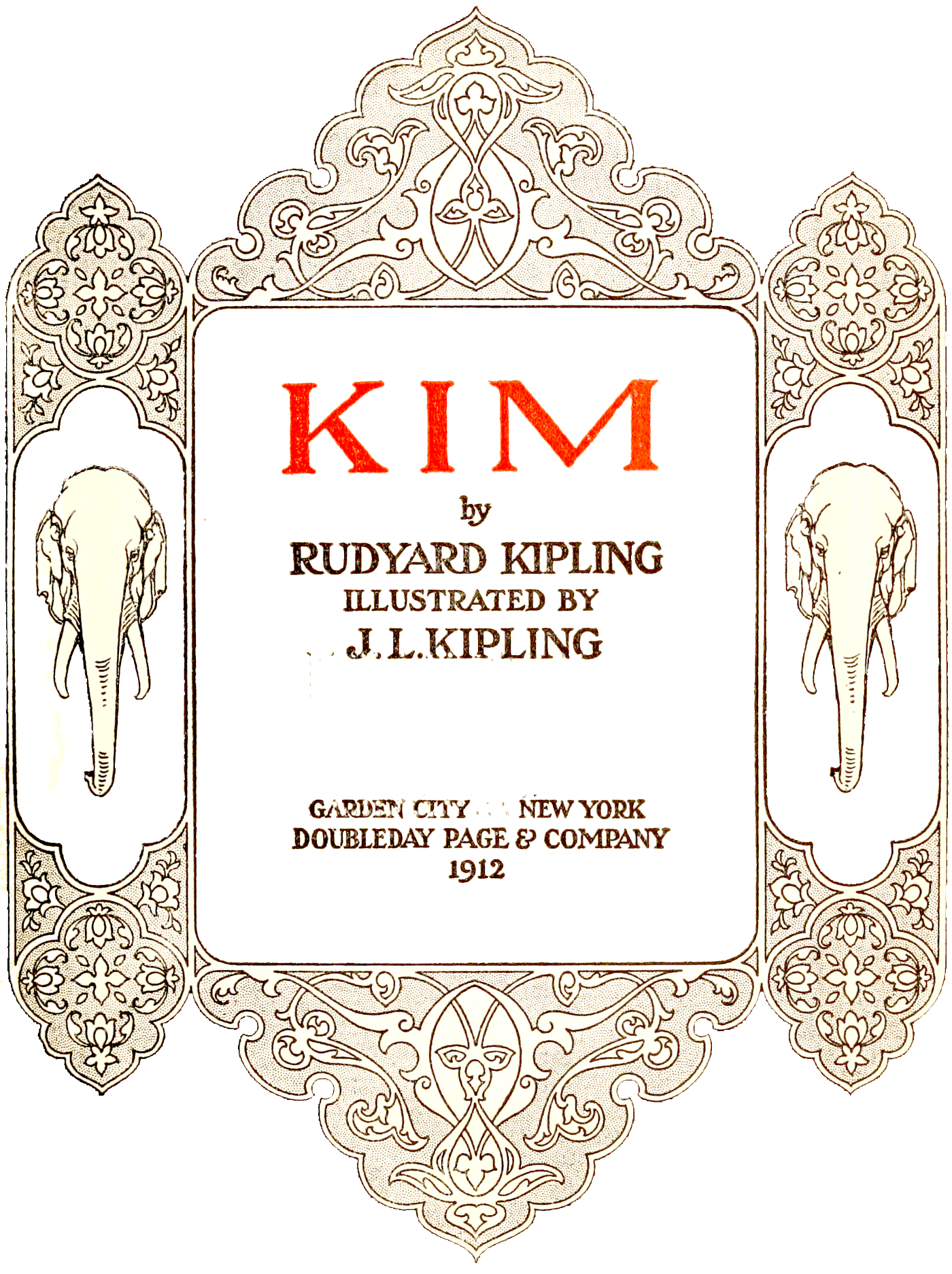
- Title page
- Author: Rudyard Kipling
- Illustrator: H. R. Millar
- Language: English
- Genre: spy and picaresque novel
- Publisher: McClure's Magazine (in serial) and Macmillan & Co (single volume)
- Publication date: October 1901
- Publication place: United Kingdom
- Media type: Print (serial and hardcover)
- Pages: 368
- OCLC: 236914

Kim is a picaresque novel by English author Rudyard Kipling. It was first published serially in McClure's Magazine from December 1900 to October 1901 as well as in Cassell's Magazine from January to November 1901, and first published in book form by Macmillan & Co. Ltd in October 1901. The novel is notable for its detailed portrait of the people, culture, and varied religions of India: "The book presents a vivid picture of India, its teeming populations, religions, and superstitions, and the life of the bazaars and the road." The story unfolds against the backdrop of the Great Game, the political conflict between Russia and Britain in Central Asia. The novel popularised the phrase and idea of the Great Game.

== Synopsis ==
The story is set after the Second Anglo-Afghan War (which ended in 1881), and before the Third (1919), probably in the period of 1893 to 1898.

Kim (Kimball O'Hara) is the orphaned son of an Irish soldier (Kimball O'Hara Sr., a former colour sergeant) and an Irish mother. Living a vagabond existence in India under British rule in the late 19th century, Kim lives by begging and running small errands on the streets of Lahore. He occasionally works for Mahbub Ali, a Pashtun horse trader who is one of the native operatives of the British secret service. Kim is so tanned and immersed in the local culture that few realise he is white.

Kim befriends an aged Tibetan lama on a quest to free himself from the Wheel of Things by finding the legendary "River of the Arrow". Kim becomes his chela (disciple) and accompanies him on his journey, initially walking along the Grand Trunk Road. On the way, Kim learns about the Great Game and is recruited by Mahbub Ali to carry a message to the head of the British Secret Service in Umballa.

Kim encounters and recognises his father's regiment on the march. Curious, he sneaks in when the soldiers camp for the night. He is caught and mistaken for a thief, but the regimental chaplain identifies Kim by his Masonic certificate, which is sewn into an amulet that he wears around his neck. Upon learning of Kim's connection to the regiment, the lama insists that the boy comply with the chaplain's plan to send him to an English school in Lucknow. The lama, a former abbot, pays for Kim's education.

Throughout his years at school, Kim remains in contact with the holy man he has come to love. He is also trained in espionage (to be a surveyor) while on vacation from school by Lurgan Sahib, a sort of benevolent Fagin, at his jewellery shop in Simla. As part of his training, Kim is given brief looks at a tray full of mixed objects and notes which have been added or taken away, a pastime still called Kim's Game, also called the Jewel Game. Other parts of this training are disguise and the careful study of the Indian population, and the characteristic dress, behaviour and "even how they spit" in order to go undercover or to uncover those in disguise. He also accompanies Mahbub Ali on one school break; when he proves apt at spying on and evaluating how to capture the city of Bikanir, Mahbub Ali persuades his superior, a skeptical Colonel Creighton, that the boy is ready.

After three years of schooling, Kim begins to take part in the Great Game, joining the Secret Service at 20 rupees a month. Kim rejoins the lama and at the behest of Kim's superior, Hurree Chunder Mookherjee, they make a trip to the Himalayas so they can try to find out what a couple of Russian intelligence agents, one Russian and one Frenchman, are doing there. Kim obtains maps, papers and other important items from the Russian agents, who are working to undermine British control of the region. Mookherjee persuades the Russian agents to hire him as a guide. When the Russian strikes the lama in the face, Kim attacks the man, then flees when shot at, while the outraged porters abandon the party and take the lama away to safety.

The lama realises that he has gone astray. His search for the River of the Arrow should be taking place in the plains, not in the mountains, and he orders the porters to take them back. Here Kim and the lama are nursed back to health after their arduous journey. Kim delivers the Russian documents to Hurree, and a concerned Mahbub Ali comes to check on Kim.

The lama becomes convinced he has found his river and will achieve Enlightenment, and wants to share it with Kim.

== Characters ==
- Kimball "Kim" O'Hara – an orphan son of an Irish soldier, the protagonist; "A poor white, the poorest of the poor"
- Kimball O'Hara Sr. – Kim's father
- Teshoo Lama – a Tibetan lama, the former abbot of the Such-zen monastery in the western Himalayas, on a spiritual journey
- Mahbub Ali – a Ghilzai Pashtun horse trader and spy for the British
- Colonel Creighton – a British Army officer, ethnologist, and spy
- Lurgan Sahib – a Simla gem trader and spy
- Hurree Chunder Mookherjee (Hurree Babu, also the Babu) – a Bengali intelligence operative working for the British; Kim's direct superior
- Reverend Arthur Bennett – the Church of England chaplain of the Mavericks, the fictional Irish regiment to which Kim's father belonged
- Father Victor – the Roman Catholic chaplain of the Mavericks
- Huneefa – a sorceress who performs a devil invocation ritual to protect Kim
- E23 – a hunted spy for the British, whom Kim helps by effectively disguising him
- The Woman of Shamlegh ("Lispeth"), who lives in the mountains and tries to seduce Kim
- The Kulu woman ("Sahiba"), a garrulous old lady from the Rajput who takes in and looks after Kim and the lama

== Critical assessment ==
Considered by many to be Kipling's masterpiece, opinion is varied about its consideration as children's literature or not. Roger Sale, in his history of children's literature, concludes "Kim is the apotheosis of the Victorian cult of childhood, but it shines now as bright as ever, long after the Empire's collapse..."

About a reissue of the novel in 1959 by Macmillan, the reviewer writes "Kim is a book worked at three levels. It is a tale of adventure...It is the drama of a boy having entirely his boy's own way...and it is the mystical exegesis of this pattern of behaviour..." This reviewer concludes "Kim will endure because it is a beginning like all masterly ends..."

Nirad C. Chaudhuri considered it the best story (in English) about India – noting Kipling's appreciation of the ecological force of "the twin setting of the mountains and the plain...an unbreakable articulation between the Himalayas and the Indo-Gangetic plain".

In 1998, the Modern Library ranked Kim No. 78 on its list of the 100 best English-language novels of the 20th century. In 2003, the book was listed on the BBC's The Big Read poll of the UK's "best-loved novel".

== Adaptations ==
- An MGM film adaptation of the novel, directed by Victor Saville and produced by Leon Gordon, was released in 1950. It was adapted by Helen Deutsch and Leon Gordon, and starred Errol Flynn, Dean Stockwell, Paul Lukas, Robert Douglas, Thomas Gomez, and Cecil Kellaway.
- In 1960, a one-hour colour adaptation of Kim was televised as part of NBC's series Shirley Temple's Storybook. Tony Haig portrayed Kim, Michael Rennie played Captain Creighton, and Alan Napier played Colonel Devlin.
- A London Films television film version of Kim was made in 1984. It was directed by John Davies and starred Peter O'Toole, Bryan Brown, John Rhys-Davies, Julian Glover and Ravi Sheth as Kim.
- The 2016 computer game Kim adapted the book.

== Homages to and works inspired by Kim ==
- The first part of Robert A. Heinlein's 1957 novel Citizen of the Galaxy depicts a clever boy of mysterious parentage living in a feudal planet and guided by an interstellar spy. Peopled with fakirs, street vendors and wealthy elites, the beginning of the novel parallels Kim in many ways.
- Paul Scott's four-novel sequence The Raj Quartet (1966–1975) contains a subplot that mirrors Kim: an Indian boy is sent to England by his wealthy father to be raised in such a manner that when he returns, Englishmen will not be able to tell that he is Indian.
- Poul Anderson's 1985 Game of Empire, the last of his Dominic Flandry series, is loosely modeled on Kim. Like others in the series, the novel takes place in a future galactic empire setting.
- Timeri N. Murari's The Imperial Agent (1988) and The Last Victory (1989) are sequels to Kim.
- Tim Powers' 2001 novel Declare uses Kim for inspiration and epigraphs.
- In Laurie R. King's 2004 novel The Game (book 7 of the Mary Russell series), the protagonist and her husband, Sherlock Holmes, travel to India in search of Kimball O'Hara, who Holmes has encountered after the events of "The Final Problem".
- Steven Gould's 2011 novel 7th Sigma is based on the novel. Gould's work features a young boy (named Kim) who is raised by a martial arts teacher and becomes involved in intelligence work. Quotes from Kim are used as chapter headers.
- Stephen Alter's 2025 novel The Greatest Game is written as a sequel to Kipling's Kim, and is periodised a few months before and a few months after India's Independence on August 15, 1947.

== Tributes ==
The town of Kim, Colorado, is named in honour of the book.

British spy and defector Kim Philby was born Harold Philby in Ambala, then in British India. His father, a member of the Indian Civil Service, gave him the nickname "Kim" on account of his fraternisation with the servants.

== Bibliography ==
=== Editions ===
The Sussex edition is standard for Kipling's works. Noted critical editions include:

- Kipling, Rudyard. Kim (Harmondsworth: Penguin, 1987). ISBN 0-14-018352-3 With an introduction and notes by Edward Said.
- Kipling, Rudyard, Kim, (New York: W. W. Norton & Company, 2002). ISBN 0-393-96650-X A modern edition with extensive notes, essays, maps and references.

=== Critical works ===
- Benedetti, Amedeo, Il Kim di Kipling. In: "LG Argomenti", Genova, Erga, a. XLIII (2007), n. 4, pp. 17–21.
- Hopkirk, Peter, Quest for Kim: in Search of Kipling's Great Game (London: John Murray, 1996). ISBN 0-7195-5560-4 The author visits the locations of the novel and discusses the real-life personages that may have possibly inspired its characters.
- Wilson, Angus, The Strange Ride of Rudyard Kipling: His Life and Works, (New York, The Viking Press: 1977). ISBN 0-670-67701-9
