= Walter Rane =

American painter and illustrator (born 1949)

- Born: Walter Rane; 1949 (age 76–77); National City, California
- Known for: Painting
- Spouse: Linda Rane
- Awards: Award of Merit, International Art Competition, Church History Museum; Associate Directors Award, Springville Museum of Art
- Website: walterraneprints.com

Walter Rane (born 1949) is an American painter and illustrator known for book illustrations and religious art.

Rane was born in National City, California and raised in Southern California. He obtained a Bachelor of Fine Arts at the Art Center College of Design in Pasadena, California.

== Career ==
Rane began his career as a book and magazine illustrator in New York City. Some of his clients were Random House, Reader's Digest, Bantam Books, and National Geographic. Rane illustrated Meet Kit: An American Girl by Valerie Tripp, Recapitulation by Wallace Stegner, and In This Our Life by Ellen Glasgow. He also illustrated the Franklin Library 1978 edition of William Faulkner's Absalom, Absalom, and the 1980 edition of Walker Percy's The Moviegoer.

== LDS Church art ==
In the early 1990s the Church of Jesus Christ of Latter-day Saints (LDS Church) asked him to begin creating works of art on religious themes. Many of his works depict scenes described in the Book of Mormon while others focus on events in the life of Jesus Christ. He also painted events from the life of Joseph Smith. Rane's work has appeared in the LDS Church's International Art Competition seven times.

In 2002, Rane was commissioned by Deseret Book to paint 17 original oil paintings for the book By the Hand of Mormon depicting scenes from the Book of Mormon. One painting from the series, an image of the empty tomb titled He is Not Here, has become one of Rane's most recognizable works.

Rane painted a large mural at the LDS Visitors Center at Winter Quarters in Omaha, Nebraska. Some of his original paintings appear in the LDS Conference Center, the Relief Society Building, and the Church Office Building.

== Personal life ==
Rane and his wife, Linda, are the parents of four children and live in New York City, NY. Rane is a member of the LDS Church.

== Awards and honors ==
In 2006 Rane was the recipient of the Associate Directors Award at the 21st annual Spiritual and Religious Arts Show at the Springville Museum of Art. His work is included in the permanent collections of the Church History Museum, the Springville Museum of Art, and Southern Virginia University. In 2013, his work was showcased at the 10th Annual Shenandoah Invitational Art Gala at Southern Virginia University.
