= Kit Kittredge =

Fictional character in the American Girl franchise

- American Girl character
- Artwork of Kit Kittredge as illustrated by Walter Rane.
- First appearance: Meet Kit (2000)
- First game: American Girl: Kit Mystery Challenge! (2008)
- Created by: American Girl, Valerie Tripp
- Portrayed by: Caitlin Waite (original illustrations); Abigail Breslin
- Voiced by: Kamilah Lay (A Treehouse of My Own); Tara Strong (Mad)

In-universe information
- Full name: Margaret Mildred Kittredge
- Nicknames: Kit, Squirt
- Occupation: Student, amateur journalist
- Family: Jack Kittredge (Father); Margaret Kittredge (Mother); Charles Kittredge (Brother)
- Relatives: Mildred Morrison (Aunt); Hendrick Frosbythe (Uncle)
- Origin: Cincinnati, Ohio
- Nationality: American
- Birth date and place: May 19, 1923; Cincinnati, Ohio

Margaret Mildred "Kit" Kittredge is a fictional character in the American Girl series of books, written by Valerie Tripp. Kit serves as a protagonist and central character to her story arc, set during the Great Depression. Kit's core series of books was written by Valerie Tripp and illustrated by Walter Rane.

== Concept and design ==
Development of the character started in 1998, while series author Valerie Tripp was working on the Josefina books. Tripp cites Cincinnati's proximity to the Ohio River, along with the city's industries, works programs such as the Civilian Conservation Corps and Works Progress Administration, and the Cincinnati Union Terminal, as the reasons for her choice of where the Kit Kittredge stories took place. The city's association with baseball, particularly the Cincinnati Reds and player Ernie Lombardi was also incorporated into the narrative. Tripp also stated that she drew inspiration from her mother's experiences during the Great Depression, and also from her daughter's tales of affluenza, which she used to teach children the importance of being grateful for what they have and helping those in need. Author Valerie Tripp has described Kit as representing the grit and determination needed to overcome the economic hardships of the Great Depression. Coinciding with the doll's release was a food drive and a fundraising program hosted by various charitable organizations. After the launch of the doll, Tripp later received a letter from a woman coincidentally named Kit Kittredge who also grew up in Cincinnati during the 1930s.

In 2020, former child model and redditor Caitlin Waite–who lent her likeness to the character–uploaded behind-the-scenes photos of her and a few other models in an Imgur post, also revealing that the character's original meet outfit received a last-minute revision prior to release due to a batch of straw hats that came with the doll which broke easily; the books' illustrations had to be redone to account for the change in material, forcing Waite and the others to travel back to the Pleasant Company offices at Madison, Wisconsin for a reshoot.

The 2023 re-issue of Meet Kit released to coincide with the character's 100th birthday includes a foreword from Valerie Tripp, where she reveals that the Kit Kittredge character is in large part based on her own mother who was the same age as Kit in 1932.

=== Character overview ===
First of all, I wanted a city in the near Midwest. For all the metaphorical reasons, it was very important that it was on a river. The constant flow, the constant movement and change. Then again, maybe I was working in New Mexico [on the Josefina series] all those years.

— Valerie Tripp, Cincinnati Magazine

Kit was born as Margaret Mildred Kittredge on May 19, 1923 in Cincinnati, Ohio to a well-to-do family, and was named after her mother and her Aunt Millie. She, however, prefers to go by a nickname given to her by her family, which was taken from both her surname and the song "Pack Up Your Troubles in Your Old Kit-Bag". Kit's father, Jack, owned a car dealership business in Cincinnati and was a World War I veteran. Her father's business still seemed to do well during the onset of the Great Depression, but was eventually forced to close when Jack used up his savings to pay his employees, sending the Kittredges into poverty.

Kit is first seen in Meet Kit wearing a lavender-pink sweater and cardigan, a floral print pleated skirt and a pair of white canvas sandals. As her family suffered financially during the Great Depression, she was later seen wearing hand-me-downs or used clothing, and at one point during her birthday, her aunt Millie made her a dress from feed sacks, for which she was eventually grateful. Kit is the only historical American Girl to have short hair. To reflect her era, her hair is cut into a bob, although in some illustrations she is shown to be wearing it in short pigtails.

With the launch of American Girl's BeForever revamp, Kit's meet outfit was retconned to that of a bright blue-green sleeveless dress with a white Peter Pan collar, and a flared skirt with floral print. Kit's old meet outfit was still available for purchase as a separate item for a time before being discontinued. The classic meet outfit was again re-issued in time for the character's 100th birthday in 2023.

=== Attributes ===
Unlike her best friend Ruthie, Kit is a tomboy who cares less about dresses, chores and things that she considers "flouncy". She is more inclined towards baseball (especially Ernie Lombardi of the Cincinnati Reds), adventures such as Robin Hood, country life, and typing up her own news reports, as she dreams of becoming a reporter one day.

Kit hates change, even though at one point she did long for it to happen, and dislikes being dependent on charities, which spurs her fascination with Amelia Earhart. The books also depict her as being stubborn and somewhat fussy, as she finds chores around the house to be rather boring and tedious, though eventually she realizes her family's misfortunes and learns to be more supportive and helpful.

She has a strong sense of pride, but she eventually realizes that she is carried away by it and learns to be humble, and tackle her problems with thrift and cleverness. Kit also tends to be easily embarrassed and irritated, like in Kit Learns a Lesson where she is angered by one of her classmates who teased her for her family's sudden descent into poverty.

Kit is also shown to be close to her father, as depicted in the film, and in the aforementioned part where Kit pushed her classmate for his taunts against her father and family.

== Appearances ==
=== Main book series ===
==== First to third books ====
Upon hearing about Mrs. Howard and her son Stirling moving into the Kittredge household while her husband was off to Chicago for work, Kit was excited to have a boy of her age to play with. Her hopes were dashed when she learns about Stirling's poor health, though both shared their enthusiasm for baseball. Excited, Kit rushes to her room and comes back bringing an article about Ernie Lombardi, only to hit Mrs. Howard causing Kit's mother's dishes to break as they flew off the tray. Margaret chastises Kit for her brash behavior. Angered and disappointed, Kit stormed to her room, blaming Stirling for her misfortune. As she was waiting for her father to come in so she could share her article, Charlie came in, explaining how Kit's situation was nothing compared to those who lost their jobs because of the Depression. Kit, while writing of ways for her to help save money, hoped for her Dad to get a job, but this proved futile as Jack often came home in vain. Kit's mother then comes up with taking in boarders, much to the surprise of Kit's ill-tempered Uncle Hendrick. Kit wasn't pleased with the idea either, more so as Stirling, whom she initially had a chagrined relationship with, will be staying in her old room, and she has to sleep in the attic. Ruthie assures her about the attic, likening it to Sara Crewe's room in A Little Princess. Kit tearfully relents, and makes the most of her new surroundings as she cleaned and fixed her room, to which her mother praised.

Kit and her family are still adjusting to the changes brought by taking up boarders in their household and the chores involved in it in Kit Learns a Lesson. She is hoping that her father would land a job some day, so much that in an altercation, she was incensed at her classmate Roger's remarks towards her father and her family's financial problems, spoiling the preparations for a Thanksgiving pageant. A trip to the local soup kitchen as part of their punishment made her realize the plight of those surrounding her besides her own family, even more so as her father was one of those in line for lunch.

With Kit's family facing financial problems, along with the threat of their house being foreclosed, Ruthie tries to come to Kit's aid in Kit's Surprise, cheering up her best friend with fairy-tale stories and helping her like paying for Kit's movie ticket; Kit feels embarrassed at being subjected to charity and is annoyed at Ruthie's fanciful, idealistic worldview, viewing it as unrealistic. Kit's sense of pride gets the better of her and this eventually led to an argument, begrudgingly parting ways with each other. Uncle Hendrick's spitefulness towards her family added to her problems, but Kit is grateful for the errands he gave as she earned more than enough to help her family. The heavy snow forced Kit to spend the night at Hendrick's house. Kit has to call Ruthie to ask her to inform her parents about her stay at her uncle's home—Kit apologizes to her best friend, and they both make amends.

==== Fourth to sixth books ====
Kit's Aunt Millie paid a visit from Kentucky to Cincinnati to help out her family, using the moniker "Use It Up, Wear It Down, Make It Due, or Do Without". Kit makes a "Waste-Not Want-Not Almanac", which includes the thrifty tips, and also adopts a dog and names it Grace. When Aunt Millie comes to her school and announces a Penny-Pinching party for her birthday, Kit's classmates now learn of her family's poverty; she loses her temper and lashes out at Aunt Millie, hurting the latter. However, she later feels guilty. Hearing that Aunt Millie is heading back to Kentucky, the family goes to convince her to come back. Kit, knowing that it's her fault, eventually apologizes for her behavior, and shows Aunt Millie the almanac she made, who forgives her. The party is a success.

Kit befriends a young hobo named Will Shepherd in Kit Saves The Day, spurring her fascination with life at the hobo jungle. Having been burned out by the endless chores and errands at home, and with her brother working with the Civilian Conservation Corps in Montana, Kit, with no other choice, decides to go on an adventure with Will, who shared his experiences as a runaway teen leaving his family behind and resorting to morally questionable means to survive such as petty theft and faking illness to gain sympathy. Will reluctantly takes her and Stirling to the dangerous act of "riding the rails"—hitchhiking aboard freight trains, a common practice by destitute people of the time to find work. This fell through when Kit is arrested and jailed for her antics. Feigning illness, Kit escapes, but Will and Stirling are left behind. Kit rushes home to explain the situation to her parents, and they went back to rescue the boys. Kit's experiences with the hobo camp gave her a sense of respect for the less fortunate.

As the Kittredge family adapts to the changes they experienced during the Great Depression, Uncle Hendrick comes to stay at the Kittredge boarding house for the winter. Kit is tasked by Hendrick to write letters to the editor on his behalf expressing his dissatisfaction with society and Franklin D. Roosevelt's New Deal programs. His angry letters, some of which were scathing rants at the expense of the hobo community, concerned Kit, which led her to write an editorial in support of those in need, especially about the struggles less fortunate children had to endure. Kit's editorial is published, spurring people to donate goods to children at the soup kitchen.

=== Other books ===
In addition to being a supporting character in Really Truly Ruthie, a companion book which came bundled with the Ruthie Smithens doll, Kit also appeared in a number of mysteries set in the Kit Kittredge story arc, and a gamebook where the reader takes on the role of a person who found their way to the past and befriends Kit, where they embark on an adventure depending on the reader's choices.

=== Film rendition ===
In the film version, Kit, portrayed by Abigail Breslin, hasn't been radically changed from her original book portrayal; several minor details however were altered in the film, namely her brother Charlie and Aunt Millie as unseen characters and only mentioned in passing, and other changes to her and her relatives' backstory.

== In other media ==
Kit Kittredge as portrayed by Abigail Breslin in Kit Kittredge: An American Girl.

A feature film Kit Kittredge: An American Girl was released to theaters on July 2, 2008, starring Abigail Breslin in the title role. Breslin's performance in the film was praised by critics; Joe Morgenstern of The Wall Street Journal wrote that she "carries the event-stuffed story with unflagging grace". Several new items were added to Kit's collection to coincide with the film.

Two video games based on her stories were also developed and published, namely Kit Mystery Challenge! for the Nintendo DS, and the point-and-click adventure game A Tree House of My Own for Microsoft Windows.

A parody of Kit also appears in an episode of the animated comedy show Mad, where she is portrayed as having a daughter who participates in a parody of Toddlers & Tiaras.

== Reception ==
Nancy Davis Kho of Common Sense Media praised the character's portrayal and Valerie Tripp's depiction of the novels' early to mid 1930s setting, stating how she found Kit to be an "inherently likable character, upbeat and friendly but by no means perfect". Kho noted how despite the character's shortcomings and initially negative and callous attitude towards those surrounding her, Kit's approach towards adversity "is a good lesson for kids in any situation." Kho also drew parallels to the 2008 financial crisis (which coincided with the release of the film adaptation), and remarked how the stories were a cautionary tale on dealing with a declining economy; "Even so, the main character's pluckiness will have readers rooting for her to prevail." Jennifer Frey of The Washington Post also noted the film adaptation's relevance to the 2008 financial crisis, stating that it "highlights one effect of setting a fictional story in an all-too-real and relevant past: History lessons become current-event lessons."

== See also ==
- Hilde Lysiak, an American child writer notable for her newspaper story on a suspected murder
