= Kim's Game =

Memory game

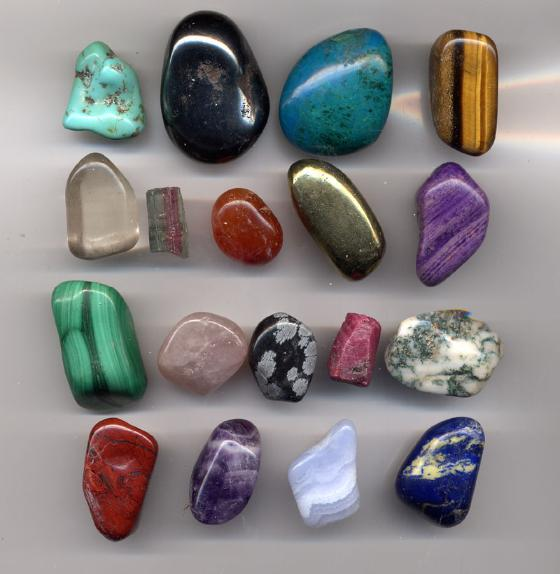
Kim's Game is a memory exercise, played with a selection of stones or other distinguishable objects

Kim's Game is a game or exercise played by Scouts, the military, and other groups, in which a selection of objects must be memorised. The game develops a person's capacity to observe and remember details. The name is derived from Rudyard Kipling's 1901 novel Kim, in which the protagonist plays the game during his training as a spy.

== In Kim ==
In Kim, the game is called both the Play of the Jewels and the Jewel Game. Kim, a teenager being trained in secret as a spy, spends a month in Simla, British India at the home of Mr. Lurgan, who ostensibly runs a jewel shop but in truth is engaged in espionage for the British against the Russians. Lurgan brings out a copper tray and tosses a handful of fifteen jewels onto it; his boy servant explains to Kim:

Look on them as long as thou wilt, stranger. Count and, if need be, handle. One look is enough for me. When thou hast counted and handled and art sure that thou canst remember them all, I cover them with this paper, and thou must tell over the tally to Lurgan Sahib. I will write mine.

They contest the game many times, sometimes with jewels, sometimes with odd objects, and sometimes with photographs of people. It is considered a vital part of training in observation; Lurgan says:

[Do] it many times over till it is done perfectly – for it is worth doing.

== For young children ==
This game is commonly played with young children, either preschool or in the first year or two of schooling (age 5 and 6) as it promotes the development of memory and observation skills and can be used for learning new groups of objects, such as shapes or fruits.

When played with a young audience, the game is often changed to a simpler version where after attempting to memorise the contents of the tray, it is covered or taken away and one object secretly removed from it. Rather than being asked to list all the objects they saw on the tray, the tray is returned with one item missing and the players are asked to identify that missing object.

== In Scouting ==
In his book Scouting Games Robert Baden-Powell, the founder of Scouting, names the exercise Kim's Game and describes it as follows:

The Scoutmaster should collect on a tray a number of articles – knives, spoons, pencil, pen, stones, book and so on – not more than about fifteen for the first few games, and cover the whole over with a cloth. He then makes the others sit round, where they can see the tray, and uncovers it for one minute. Then each of them must make a list on a piece of paper of all the articles he can remember... The one who remembers most wins the game.

== Military use ==
The United States Marine Corps' Scout Sniper Instructor School in Quantico, Virginia, is one establishment that teaches the game as part of its curriculum. Another is sniper training schools at Camp Lejeune, at Camp Pendleton, and in Hawaii. It is mentioned in a military glossary with the backronym "Keep In Memory".

The Kim's Game is also used as a memory test in Royal Marines commando training and Royal Marines sniper training.
