= Game-Labs =

Ukrainian video game developer

- Type: Private
- Industry: Video games
- Founded: in Kyiv, Ukraine
- Headquarters: Kyiv
- Key people: Maxim Zasov, Nick Thomadis
- Products: Ultimate General series
- Parent: Stillfront Group
- Website: www.game-labs.net

Game-Labs (or Game Labs) is a Ukrainian strategy and simulator video game developer based in Kyiv. It is best known for the Ultimate General and Ultimate Admiral series of games among others. In 2021, the studio was purchased by Stillfront, a Swedish holding company.

== Background ==
The company was founded in January 2013 by Maxim Zasov who went on to become the CEO. That same year, he approached Nick Thomadis, formerly the creator of "DarthMod" (a series of mods that improved the AI and gameplay in several Total War games) and one of the most well-known modders in the Total War modding community. Zasov then asked him to develop a game for the company, which eventually became Gettysburg. Thomadis, as Game-Lab's Lead Game Designer, also went on to develop Civil War, another successful game for the studio, and later Dreadnoughts.

In May 2021, the studio entered an agreement to be 100% share purchased for $32.5 million by the Stillfront Group, a Swedish holding company. By that time it had "a team of approximately 30 people located in Ukraine, Russia, Greece, Dubai, Italy and Estonia".

On 24 February 2022, Game-Labs alongside others announced that development on game updates would be halted due to the 2022 Russian invasion of Ukraine as the staff were prioritising saving their families.

== Games ==
=== Ultimate General series ===
Ultimate General
- The official logo of the series
- Genres: Turn-based strategy, real-time tactics
- Developer: Game-Labs LLC
- Platforms: Microsoft Windows, macOS, iPadOS, Linux
- First release: Ultimate General: Gettysburg; 12 June 2014 & 15 October 2014
- Latest release: Ultimate General: Civil War; 26 November 2016 & 14 July 2017

Ultimate General is a popular series of American-war themed computer wargames that focus on tactics and military history. The first two were designed by Thomadis.

==== Gettysburg ====
Ultimate General: Gettysburg, the first game of the series, allows players to lead thousands of soldiers in the Battle of Gettysburg. It first became available in Steam Early Access on 12 June 2014, and was fully released on 15 October 2014 The game has been updated since release and the final version, Patch 1.09, was released in November 2017.

According to the developers, the game is unique in "Giving you the chance to be the General of either the Union or Confederate army ... it allows you to recreate the historical facts or try out many speculative scenarios." The game claims to have accurate maps utilising satellite images and historical charts. Additional game-play features include Custom Battles, where different AI Commanders and the multi-day battles provide replayability. There are also additional custom battles where players can unlock speculative scenarios that can be played as quick battles, either randomised or with full unit strength and default army deployments. There is also a Multiplayer Experience in which the game has 18 maps for one-on-one matches.

There are differences between the iPad and the computer versions. The game was redesigned for usability and playability on tablets, and the user interface was reworked. The campaign here is replaced by 10 missions for each side, and multiplayer is not available.

==== Civil War ====
Ultimate General: Civil War, unlike Gettysburg, offers a campaign system that covers the whole American Civil War from 1861-1865, including historical battles, units and events. The game was released on 16 November 2016 in Steam Early Access. As an early access version, the game was regularly updated, and a "completed version" of the game was released on 14 July 2017. The "final" version of the game, Patch 1.10, was released on 18 May 2018. As with the previous title, the battle landscapes are hand-drawn, utilising data from satellite and historical maps

The game campaign allows players to participate in more than 50 battles, from small engagements to major battles that can last several days over multiple maps. The player's, and therefore the campaign's, ongoing success is interactively connected to player actions and battle outcomes. Historical battles can be also played separately. Custom battles also include the ability to play hypothetical battles such as Battle of Washington, and imagined parts of historical conflicts, while also covering additional battles, such as Battle of Spotsylvania Courthouse.

==== American Revolution ====
A new addition to the series, based on the American War of Independence, was released as early access on 6 June 2024.

=== Ultimate Admiral series ===
In 2019, Game-Labs released a new series of naval-based games in early access called Ultimate Admiral. To date, two main games have been released:

- Age of Sail (2021) - set around the time of the American Revolutionary War, with players choosing either the Royal or the US navies.
- Dreadnoughts (Early access 2021; full game 2023) - recreates the era of the international naval arms race starting around 1890.

=== Other games ===
Other games include:

- Naval Action (2016) - a MMO historical naval simulation game
- Sea Legends (Currently in development) - an Age of Sail simulator
- This Land is My Land (Early access 2019; full game 2021) - set in the 19th-century American frontier
- A Twisted Path To Renown (Early access 2023) - first person shooter set in the Wild West Circa 1899
