= Kim (video game) =

2016 adventure video game

- Developer: The Secret Games Company
- Engine: Unity
- Platforms: Windows; Mac OS X
- Release: 24 October 2016
- Genres: Adventure; RPG
- Mode: Single-player

Kim is an adventure role-playing video game developed by British independent developer The Secret Games Company, based on the novel of the same name by Rudyard Kipling. The game allows the player to take control of the novel's young hero, the teenage beggar Kim, as he begins his practical training as a field agent working for British intelligence in "The Great Game". Along the way, Kim meets an aged Tibetan lama and adopts him as his traveling companion, joining his search for a spiritual river of healing. Carry secret messages for Mahbub Ali the charismatic horse trader and undercover British agent, dicker for food with street vendors, collect maps to speed your travel, and experience the wonder of the "te-rain" that connects British India from Lahore to Benares.

== Gameplay ==
The game's open-world format encourages players to explore at their own pace, either following the plot of Kipling's novel through a series of quests or charting their own path among the lively cities, roads, and countryside of India. Players gain and lose merit for their choices on the road, and can also increase their score by winning the good opinion of the game's major NPCs. The game ends once Kim reaches manhood at the age of 18.

There is an element of stealth involved in some parts of the game, as attempting to break into a building or attacking an NPC will attract the attention of the police. Avoiding the sight lines of NPCs (pictured as cone-shaped patches of light) will ensure that the player's activities remain unnoticed. Being caught will result in a time penalty, advancing the player closer to the end-point of Kim's eighteenth birthday.

The player can acquire different suits of clothing, which unlock new options for interaction with NPCs and locations, and equip various period-relevant weapons such as the "Brown Bess" flintlock musket. Food and drink increase Kim's health and happiness, which decline over time more or less quickly depending on the player's choices; for example, travelling quickly on foot will sap health while costing a shorter amount of time, and purchasing sweets or other treats from a street vendor will increase Kim's happiness.

== Dialogue and environments ==
The game features passages quoted directly from Kipling's novel to populate the text-based NPC dialogue interactions and provide descriptions when the player enters newly-discovered locations. These location introductions also include period photographs of cities and major landmarks, while the game environments are 2.5D hand-painted town maps and procedurally generated countryside. The wide variety of NPCs which populate the world capture the cultural, social, and religious diversity in British colonial India, ranging from English policemen to Hindu merchants, Sikh letter writers, Muslim priests, and many more.

== Reception ==
Glitch Free Gaming praised Kim as "deep and intelligent," being characterized by "beautiful language," a "unique setting," and a "subtle and atmospheric" soundtrack, while noting the "time and investment" required to get into the game. The Idle Weekend podcast criticized the game's "intrusive" combat mechanics, contrasting them to the "personable" and "charming" quality of Kim's coming-of-age story, something that TechRaptor also alluded to, complaining that "the game has a lot of moving parts but most of them never seem to interact with each other."

Several other reviewers focused on the game's character as an adaptation of a classic literary work. Rock Paper Shotgun referenced Kipling's reputation as an orientalist writer, but saw the game as "channel[ing] much of the appeal of the novel," which is "charming and warm, open-minded even as it betrays a mind shaped by casual, offhanded racism." Gamasutra compared Kim to The Witcher 3 (which was released the year before [2015]) in that both games are adaptations of classic novels, and interviewed Jeremy Hogan (founder of The Secret Games Company) on the unusual decision to make a game based on a British novel more than a century old.

Kim was nominated as a finalist at Indiecade 2017.
