= American Girl (video game series) =

- Genres: Edutainment, adventure
- Developers: Various, including: The Learning Company; Mattel Interactive; ImaginEngine; Bon Art Studio; Webfoot Technologies; American Girl; [x]cube Games
- Publishers: American Girl; THQ; The Learning Company
- Platforms: iOS, Mac OS, Microsoft Windows, Nintendo DS, Android
- First release: The American Girls Premiere; 1997
- Latest release: American Girl World (Roblox); 2023

American Girl is a series of video games developed by various studios and distributed by American Girl.

Games in the American Girl series are based upon characters and stories set within the toy line's fictional universe, from historical-era characters like Kit Kittredge, to contemporary ones such as those from the Girl of the Year line or WellieWishers. Common gameplay elements within the series center upon educational activities, mostly focusing around American history and culture, though other aspects such as adventure, puzzle or even action elements are occasionally interspersed in some of the games.

In 2023 American Girl collaborated with the Roblox development group Melonverse for an in-game experience based on the franchise.

== Titles ==
Release timeline
1997	The American Girls Premiere (original release)
1998	The American Girls Premiere (2nd Edition)
1999	The American Girls: Dress Designer
1999	Your Notebook (with help from Amelia) (Note: The Amelia's Notebooks line was released under the American Girl label from 1999 to 2003, but is generally not considered to be a part of the main franchise.)
2000
2001
2002
2003
2004
2005
2006
2007	American Girl: Julie Saves the Eagles
2007	Julie Finds a Way
2008	American Girl: Mia Goes for Great
2008	Kit Mystery Challenge!
2008	American Girl: Kit - A Tree House of My Own
2009
2010
2011	Secret Wardrobe
2011	Shave Ice
2011	Cheer On!
2012	Gymtastic
2012	Port to Port
2013	Paint Ponies
2014	Tropical Toss
2014	Playful Pet
2014	Isabelle Dance Studio
2015	Scene Sounds
2015	Maryellen TV Console
2015	Grace Sweet Shop
2015	Rocket Rally
2016	Lea's Born for Adventure
2016	WellieWishers
2017	WellieWishers: Garden Fun
2018	American Girl World
2019
2020
2021
2022
2023	American Girl World (Roblox)

=== Edutainment games ===
The first two games in the series marked American Girl's (then known as Pleasant Company) expansion into video games. They featured American Girl's historical character roster, which of the time consisted of six characters representing various periods of American history.

- The American Girls Premiere is the first entry in the series, developed and published by The Learning Company for American Girl and released in 1997 for personal computer platforms. The game allows the creation and direction of unique stage plays starring the historical characters, from Felicity Merriman to Molly McIntire. The Second Edition release, which was released in 1998, adds Josefina Montoya to the roster.
- The American Girls: Dress Designer is the second entry in the series, developed and released by Mattel Interactive for Windows in 1999. This was essentially an interactive version of the paper doll sets American Girl sold featuring their historical characters roster, from colonial era Felicity Merriman to World War II-era Molly McIntire. The game allows players to create and edit period clothes for the historical characters. Users can choose between different patterns, styles, designs and trim for each character, and they can also build and print out a fashion portfolio.

Besides Premiere and Dress Designer, Mattel Interactive also published Your Notebook (with help from Amelia), a software toy in the form of an interactive journal based on the Amelia's Notebooks children's book series by Marissa Moss, under the American Girl banner in 1999. Developed by KnowWonder, Your Notebook allowed the user to write their own journals with the help of the titular protagonist, and comes with stamps, text effects and styles to which the user can add to their entries.

=== Games published by THQ ===
In the late 2000s American Girl collaborated with THQ for a number of games based on their franchise. Three of the games were released exclusively for Microsoft Windows, all of which are presented in a 2.5D isometric viewpoint using pre-rendered characters and backgrounds, while the other two, namely Julie Finds a Way and Kit Mystery Challenge!, are released for the Nintendo DS.

- American Girl: Julie Saves The Eagles is the third entry in the series, developed by ImaginEngine and the first to be published by THQ for American Girl on October 15, 2007 for Microsoft Windows. The main goal in the game is to help Julie find ways to finance an eagle release. The game, along with Mia Goes for Great and A Treehouse of My Own, uses the open-source FreeType font rendering engine, as well as the Lua programming language for most of the game's logic. The game also won a Parents' Choice Award from the non-profit Parents' Choice Foundation in 2008.
- American Girl: Julie Finds a Way is the fourth entry in the series based on Julie's stories, developed by Webfoot Technologies and released by THQ on December 3, 2007 for the Nintendo DS. The game loosely follows the plot of the series; throughout the game various mini games are interspersed into the plot. The game also offers two-player multiplayer with three of the mini games. The game's world is divided into different zones, similar to Pokemon Legends Arceus, rather than in a single continuous map like in Pokemon Scarlet and Violet. Entrances to other areas are usually denoted by a lower-quality backdrop of the zone to be visited, or an interior model with a lower level of detail.
- American Girl: Mia Goes for Great is the fifth entry in the series, based on the 2008 Girl of the Year Mia St. Clair, released on February 4, 2008 for Microsoft Windows. The game lets players participate in a number of figure skating competitions. It also features a program builder allowing players to design and customize practice routines for Mia.
- Kit Mystery Challenge is the sixth entry in the series, developed by Webfoot Technologies and released by THQ in 2008 for the Nintendo DS. The game loosely follows the events of the Kit Kittredge story arc, although unlike in Julie Finds a Way, the game is presented as a mystery-solving game in the vein of the Nancy Drew series, and does not offer a multiplayer component. Core gameplay consists of mystery-solving elements, with players being presented in a third-person viewpoint. The player is tasked to look for clues to be used as evidence, interrogate suspects or ask for leads, and analyze all the evidence and facts gathered in order to solve the case. Players can also engage in a number of side missions, such as selling eggs to neighbors and other people around the city, or running errands for cash, which can be spent on various perks, upgrades and other items, like buying food supplies or paying part of the house's mortgage.
- American Girl: Kit - A Tree House of My Own is the seventh entry in the series, also based on Kit's story arc, developed by ImaginEngine in collaboration with Bon Art Studio and published by THQ on June 23, 2008. The game is composed of several minigames, such as a Puzzle Bobble clone, an anagrams game, and a few others. Players are also rewarded with tools and other prizes that Kit needs to start her own treehouse.

=== Mobile apps ===
Since 2011 American Girl released mobile apps for download on major smartphone and tablet platforms, mostly consisting of simple games and software toys for young girls. Most of the games, which are published by the company, are exclusive to iOS, though Isabelle Dance Studio and Grace Sweet Shop were later ported to Android; newer titles in the series also saw simultaneous iOS and Android releases. American Girl has since de-listed their mobile games from app stores, instead offering simple browser games through their Play minisite.

- Secret Wardrobe is a puzzle game for iOS based on historical characters Cécile Rey and Marie-Grace Gardner, released on August 29, 2011 to tie in with the aforementioned characters' debut. Gameplay consists of a simple puzzle game where in players have to put clothes in their corresponding places.
- Shave Ice is a puzzle game for iOS based on 2011 Girl of the Year Kanani Akina. Players take the role of Kanani as she serves shaved ice to customers.
- Cheer On! is a puzzle game for iOS, serving as a companion game for the now-defunct Innerstar University online community, released on August 29, 2011.
- Gymtastic is a platform game for iOS, released in 2012 to coincide with Girl of the Year McKenna Brooks' debut. Players guide McKenna through a series of gymnastic platforms, collecting stars, bonus items and avoiding obstacles that get in her way.
- Port to Port is an adventure game for iOS, centering on Caroline Abbott as she picks up and delivers cargo on the ports of Lake Ontario during the War of 1812. Core gameplay consists of guiding Caroline's ship to a certain port and picking up supplies to be delivered back to Sackets Harbor, while trying to avoid British warships along the way.
- Paint Ponies is an app based on Saige Copeland's stories. It was released to coincide with Saige's release and was available for free on the App Store. Players round up ponies by drawing shapes around them. Bonus points are awarded for chaining combos and drawing over power-ups. A coloring book mode with scenes from Saige's world is also included.
- Playful Pet is a digital pet app released by American Girl to tie in with their Coconut line of plush toys for the Truly Me doll line. Players choose a pet dog to take care of, to which they can accessorize and play with, along with a number of activities where they can unlock rewards for their pets.
- Tropical Toss is a memory based game for iOS based on the Truly Me doll line. The game takes place in a beach, and players are tasked to copy the instructor's moves as they bounce a beach ball in time with the movement.
- Friendship Ties is a crafts-based mobile app for iOS. The app allows young girls and their friends to design virtual bracelets, either through a pre-existing pattern or a user-created one, and add accessories like buttons and charms. The app also includes instructions on how to make real-world bracelets and other such accessories.
- Isabelle Dance Studio is an app based on Isabelle Palmer's stories, released in January 2014 for iOS in line with her debut. A port of the game to Android was also released in July the same year. Players take on the role of Isabelle as she performs her ballet routines. Points are scored by tapping on the stars for Isabelle to reach and to keep them up in the air. Collecting gems fills up the starburst meter, which the player can use to clear the screen and score more points. Bigger stars reward the player with multipliers and other bonuses. If at least one star hits the floor, or if the player accidentally taps on the black pearl, the game ends and players have to start from the beginning.
- Scene Sounds is a software toy for iOS, based on the Truly Me line. The app is essentially a soundboard allowing children and their friends to add background music and ambient sound effects while they play with their dolls. Common scenarios include Christmas, summer, winter, and a hair salon. A port for Android was released exclusively for the American Girl edition of the Nabi SE tablet and for Amazon FreeTime subscribers.
- Maryellen TV Console is a software toy for iOS, released in 2015 to coincide with Maryellen Larkin's debut. The app is specifically designed for certain iPad models, such as the iPad 2, the third-generation iPad, the fourth-generation iPad, and the iPad Air, as it is intended to run as a companion app for the Maryellen TV Console toy which acts as a specially designed case for the aforementioned iPad models. Users can watch pre-made stop-motion scenes made with the Maryellen doll, or record their own with a selection of templates and background music. Users can also listen to a number of 1950s-style music that came with the app.
- Grace's Sweet Shop is a mobile game for iOS and Android. Players take on the role of Grace Thomas as they mix, bake and decorate pastries in a French bakeshop.
- Maryellen Rocket Rally is a space flight simulation game for iOS. The game features Maryellen Larkin as players design and launch space rockets, guiding them to fuel pickups and coins along the way. A port for Android was released exclusively for the American Girl edition of the Nabi SE tablet and for Amazon FreeTime subscribers.
- Lea Born for Adventure is an action-adventure mobile game for iOS. Players guide Lea Clark in a series of adventures in Brazil, where she guides baby turtles to safety and rescues a sloth.
- WellieWishers is a mobile game for iOS, released in June 2016 to coincide with the release of the WellieWishers line for younger girls. The app consists of a series of minigames, among them a basic digital pet where players can feed and pet a rabbit, a music-based minigame where the WellieWishers characters can stage a musical performance, and a minigame allowing players to make a mud pie. A freemium sequel for iOS and Android, subtitled Garden Fun, was developed by [x]cube Games and published by American Girl on October 4, 2017.

=== Roblox game ===
In 2023 American Girl collaborated with the Roblox development group Melonverse for a promotional event entitled American Girl World, based on the doll line and its roster of characters.

== Common elements ==
Most games in the series puts players in the role of an American Girl character, typically a Historical/BeForever character like Kit Kittredge or a contemporary one such as any of the Girl of the Year characters like Grace Thomas, Isabelle Palmer or Lea Clark. The games' presentation may vary from one title to the next, from an edutainment game typical of The American Girls Premiere and Dress Designer, a Nancy Drew-esque mystery as seen in Kit Mystery Challenge, to an action-adventure platform game as seen in Lea Born for Adventure.

== History ==
The first game in the series, The American Girls Premiere for Microsoft Windows and Mac OS, marked the debut of Pleasant Company into the digital software space. Linda Ehrmann, vice president of Internet business strategy consulting firm Grey Interactive, said that the video game had a due potential as it was entering a relatively untapped market, commenting that in the interactive media space, "girls are for the most part totally ignored".

== Reception ==
The American Girls Premiere was released to mostly positive reception, and received accolades from various parenting organizations; subsequent games in the series however received tepid to negative scores from gaming publications - American Girl: Kit Mystery Challenge for example was panned for its repetitive gameplay, tank controls and lack of replay value.
