= American Girl: Kit Mystery Challenge! =

2008 video game

- Developer: Webfoot Technologies
- Publisher: THQ
- Designers: Mandi Grant; Jim Grant
- Composer: Yannis Brown
- Series: American Girl
- Platform: Nintendo DS
- Release: NA: 23 June 2008
- Genre: Point-and-click adventure
- Mode: Single-player

American Girl: Kit Mystery Challenge! is a point-and-click adventure video game developed by Webfoot Technologies and published by THQ. It was released exclusively on the Nintendo DS on June 23, 2008, as part of the American Girl toy franchise. Set in 1930s Cincinnati, the game follows Kit Kittredge as she solves a range of mysteries in and around her neighborhood all while helping her family during the Great Depression.

== Gameplay ==
Screenshot from the game

Kit Mystery Challenge uses the same engine and third-person viewpoint as Julie Finds a Way. Like in the previous game, Kit's Mystery Challenge loosely follows the events of the Central Series, and in a similar vein to the Nancy Drew video games, it is presented as an interactive mystery, with five main mysteries and a sixth mission in the form of minigames consisting of riddles and puzzle challenges, though unlike Nancy Drew the game is played from a third-person perspective, with the DS's touch screen used to show gameplay; the top screen is used to display dialogue and other essential information.

Only Kit's neighborhood can be explored in the first mystery. Solving the latter unlocks three more mysteries, allowing the player to visit different areas, such as a hobo village, downtown Cincinnati, and the local school. While solving mysteries, the player has to look for clues to be used as evidence, gather information from non-player characters, and analyze all the evidence and facts in order to solve it.

Besides the main story, the player can also engage in a number of side missions, such as selling eggs to neighbors and other people around the city, or running errands for cash, which can be spent on various items, like buying food supplies or paying part of the house's mortgage. The player is also given access to a trunk with outfits where they can change Kit's appearance.

== Plot ==
In 1930s Cincinnati, Kit Kittredge and her family are facing a difficult life after Kit's father lost his business due to the Great Depression, forcing them to convert their residence into a boarding house in order to make ends meet.

Along the way, mysterious things occur in and around the household–the door to the Kittredges' chicken coop was left unlocked, a strand of pearls belonging to Kit's mother went missing, and one of the borders left early under suspicious circumstances.

In the sixth mystery, Kit takes on a number of riddles and challenges from her family and friends which she would later submit to the local newspaper.

== Reception and publicity ==
Reception

Review scores
| Publication | Score |
|---|---|
| IGN | 3.5/10 |
| Common Sense Media | 2/5 |
| Tech With Kids | 2.5/5 |

The game saw relatively little publicity especially given its niche nature as a game for young girls based on a primarily American-centric franchise; IGN's Jack Devries gave the game a negative review, criticizing its controls, camera scheme and gameplay.

Jinny Gudmundsen of Common Sense Media opined that the title "doesn't allow players much interaction in the process of being a sleuth", noting the game's low interactivity. Gudmundsen also noted the game's complicated control scheme and lack of agency on part of the player character. Tech With Kids was also critical to the game's low interactivity, repetitive gameplay and its controls.
