= Mozart: The Conspirators of Prague =

2009 video game

- Release: 2009
- Genre: Adventure

Mozart: The Conspirators of Prague is a 2009 point-and-click puzzle adventure video game developed by GameCO Studios (Game Consulting Studios) and published by Micro Application for Microsoft Windows.

== Gameplay ==
The game is a point-and-click adventure played from the third-person perspective, and includes both musical puzzles and mechanical puzzles, as well as minigames such as a cards game and a conducting game.

== Plot ==
The game concerns the life of Wolfgang Amadeus Mozart circa 1788, in which he is depicted as a Freemason. While in Prague preparing for the debut of his new opera Don Giovanni, he stumbles upon a plot to overthrow Joseph II, Holy Roman Emperor.

== Development ==
The game was announced on March 1, 2007. The game's website went live on March 13, featuring concept art, screenshots, a trailer, wallpapers, and other game information.

== Reception ==
Prior to its release, Adventure's Planet deemed the project "promising". Igromania praised the game for its aesthetic, taste, and style. JeuxVideoPC felt some of the logical leaps required to complete puzzles would annoy gamers, but commented that the game effectively immerses the player into the world. Adventure Treff identified issues with hotspot-clicking and room navigation.
