= Warrior of Rome II =

1992 video game

- Developer: Micronet
- Publisher: Micronet
- Platform: Sega Mega Drive/Genesis
- Release: JP: May 28, 1992; NA: May 1992
- Genre: Real-time strategy
- Mode: Single-player

Warrior of Rome II, also known as Caesar no Yabou II (シーザーの野望II, "Ambition of Caesar II") is a real-time strategy video game developed and published by Micronet in 1992 for the Sega Mega Drive/Genesis as a sequel to Warrior of Rome.

== Plot ==
Warrior of Rome II is a game in which the player is Julius Caesar, utilizing the armies of Rome to defeat uprisings in Asia.

== Gameplay ==
The game features a three-quarter perspective overhead view, although the two-player mode features a split-screen view. The game plays as a real-time strategy, although the player can change the movement speed based on the difficulty level. The player has the choice to play a single stage at a time or play through the entire campaign of 15 increasingly difficult stages.

== Reception ==
The game was reviewed in 1993 in Dragon #189 by Hartley, Patricia, and Kirk Lesser in "The Role of Computers" column. The reviewers gave the game 4 out of 5 stars.
