= 1821: The Struggle for Freedom =

2001 turn-based strategy video game

1821: Αγώνας για την Ελευθερία
- PC box cover
- Developer: Metal Fin
- Publisher: Metal Fin
- Designer: Konstantinos Mavrikis
- Programmers: Prokopis Giannakis; George Darlas
- Artists: Vishy Moghan, Spyros Frigas
- Composer: Dimitris Plagiannis
- Platform: Windows
- Release: GR: 2001
- Genre: Turn-based strategy
- Mode: Single-player

1821: The Struggle for Freedom (Greek: 1821: Αγώνας για την Ελευθερία) is a turn-based strategy video game developed and published by Greek game developer Icehole Games (at the time known as Metal Fin) in 2001. In 1821, the player is tasked with leading the scattered Greek forces over the course of the Greek War of Independence, and liberate Greek territories from Ottoman rule by controlling both the economic and military aspects of the revolutionary effort.

== Gameplay ==
1821 is a 2D turn-based statistical management game. The game map, which provides an isometric representation of Greece, including the Peloponnese, Central Greece, Thessaly, Epirus, Crete and the Aegean islands, is divided into territories where the players can move their armies. Each territory contains a city, which generates revenue (counted in grosha) on a monthly basis for its owner. All cities have citizens and a garrison, with some cities having a castle or a port (if that city is coastal). Furthermore, each city is characterized by a revolutionary fervor stat, which indicates how easy it is for the player to liberate that territory.

Each game round corresponds to one month of in-game time, with the final round taking place in 1829. Each unit has 30 in-game days to perform its designated actions during the course of a single round. Hence, each action (i.e. troop movement), costs a specific number of days to complete. Each unit may contain up to four different combat arms, namely irregular soldiers (klephts), regular troops, cavalry and artillery, and is led by at least one Hero, each one corresponding to a prominent figure in Greece's War of Independence. Heroes are characterized by stats affecting various aspects of the game, including Combat prowess, Persuasion, Popularity, Ambition and Greed. Heroes with high ambition or greed stats may cause infighting or even defect to the Ottoman Empire. Armies are further characterized by Training and Morale, which are affected by various elements, such as the staging of training exercises, battle outcome, and Hero leadership. Players are also required to resupply their forces at regular intervals, as any army left without supplies for three consecutive rounds is immediately disbanded. Players may bolster their ranks at a city they occupy by means of conscription, which costs both grosha and at the same time reduces the local population, while ships can be built in the ports of Hydra, Spetses and Psara for a monetary fee. From 1826 onward, players can also appeal for help to the three Great Powers—Russia, Britain and France—and receive a one-time free allied army or fleet unit, or a significant monetary loan.

Battles in 1821 take place whenever two opposing armies are moved into the same territory. If the city in that territory does not have a castle, the winner of the battle takes control of the city. If there is a castle, and the attacking army emerges victorious, the defending forces will fortify themselves, and a siege will ensue. A siege causes the defending army to gradually consume the castle's resources. When these run out, the city and consequently, the entire territory is handed over to the attacking force.

The outcome of battles is largely affected by the terrain types of the territory on which the battle takes place. There are a total of four terrain types (mountain, forest, hill and plain) and each territory may be characterized by two to four different terrain types. Before each battle, the player will have to choose in which terrain they prefer the battle to take place.

== Development and release ==
Development on 1821 lasted two years, with the game's developers reportedly completing 95% of the work working from their homes. The game is entirely presented in the Greek language and therefore saw a release only in its home country.

In 2008, Icehole released 1821 with a freeware license.
