= Quraish (video game) =

2005 video game

Quraish: The game
- Developer: Afkar media Ltd.
- Publisher: Dar al-Fiqr
- Platforms: Windows, Android
- Release: 2 August 2005
- Genre: Real-time strategy (RTS)
- Mode: Single player

Quraish (Arabic: قريش) is a 2005 real-time strategy 3D computer video game produced by Syrian video game production, Afkar Media. It is the second Arabic language-based game and a third person strategy game based on the early battles of Islam, primarily focusing on Pre-Islamic tribal wars and Apostasy wars and the Rashidun Caliphate's successful campaigns against the Eastern Roman Empire and the Sassanid dynasty of Persia.
