= Latin American wars of independence =

The Latin American wars of independence may collectively refer to all of these anti-colonial military conflicts during the decolonization of Latin America around the early 19th century:

- Haitian Revolution (1791–1804), a major slave rebellion that resulted in Saint-Domingue becoming independent as Haiti from the French Empire
- Spanish American wars of independence (1808–1833), multiple related conflicts that resulted in the independence of most of the Spanish Empire's American colonies
- Brazilian War of Independence (1821–1824), which resulted in Brazil separating from the Portuguese Empire
