= Warrior of Rome =

1991 video game

- Cover of Warrior of Rome
- Developer: Micronet
- Publisher: Micronet
- Platform: Mega Drive/Genesis
- Release: JP: February 24, 1991; NA: May 1991
- Genre: Real-time strategy
- Modes: Single-player, multiplayer

Warrior of Rome, also known as Caesar no Yabou (シーザーの野望; "Ambition of Caesar"), is a real-time strategy video game developed and published by Micronet for the Mega Drive/Genesis. The game is a fictional story about the adventures of Julius Caesar and the Roman army during his reign as general in the year 48 BCE. The game had a sequel, Warrior of Rome II.

== Gameplay ==
The player has four maps (based in Crete and latterly Egypt) to command their troops over. Players are given control over each unit of troops on the Section Map. The player can select six different options for each troop unit including approach speed, retreat to allow the unit to regain strength or setting traps. Once the troops have encountered an enemy unit, the Battle Screen appears showing a side shot of the player's troops in combat. The player can save their game progress or use a password system at the end of a completed stage.

== Images ==
Warrior of Rome main title screen
