= Rome: Caesar's Will =

2000 video game

- Developer: Montparnasse Multimedia
- Publisher: Montparnasse Multimedia
- Platform: Windows
- Release: 2000
- Genres: Adventure, Educational

Rome: Caesar's Will is an educational adventure game released in 2000.

== Production ==
A substantial part of the game's promotion was focused on an "innovative dialogue and artificial intelligence engine" called ReActiveAttitudes technology, which meant that the player could have a personality or "mask" when speaking to a character. If the player approaches the character in a "friendly" or "insulting" way, this would affect how the character interacted, resulting in branching narratives of allies and enemies.

== Plot ==
The game revolves around a murder mystery set in 44BC. As a Roman legioner, the player takes on the role of detective who has to prove Aurelia didn't poison her husband, and solve the crime before time runs out.

== Gameplay ==
The game has a time limit of 40 hours; actions such as moving locations via the map cause the player to lose precious seconds. The interface contains an inventory of items, a notepad to write down clues, and an encyclopedia to give the player additional background knowledge as they play.

== Critical reception ==
Jeux Video praised the music and sound effects for creating a sense of atmospheric suspense. Tom Houston of Just Adventure criticised the ReActiveAttitudes technology for not delivering a diverging series of stories as promised.
