= ZuluWar! =

1996 video game

- Developer: Incredible Simulations
- Publisher: Incredible Simulations
- Designers: Jeff Lapkoff, Dennis Bishop
- Platform: Microsoft Windows
- Release: 1996
- Genre: Computer wargame
- Modes: Single-player, multiplayer

ZuluWar! is a 1996 computer wargame published by Incredible Simulations. Designed by Jeff Lapkoff and Dennis Bishop, it simulates the Anglo-Zulu War.

== Gameplay ==
ZuluWar! is a computer wargame that simulates the Anglo-Zulu War from a strategic level. The player may control either the British Empire or Zulu Kingdom.

== Development ==
ZuluWar! was designed by Jeff Lapkoff and Dennis Bishop for Incredible Simulations, a company owned by Lapkoff. It follows the design trend in Lapkoff's earlier work, such as Custer's Last Command and Defend the Alamo, of focusing on losing battles. It was the first computer wargame dedicated to the Anglo-Zulu War released since Rorke's Drift released by Impressions Games in 1990, and Lapkoff's first game developed for Microsoft Windows.

== Reception ==
Reception

Review scores
Publication	Score
Computer Games Strategy Plus	3/5
Computer Gaming World	4/5
PC Gamer (US)	83%

Computer Gaming World wargame columnist Terry Coleman offered ZuluWar! a positive review. He later the game for his 1996 "Good Things Come in Small Packages" award, highlighting its "nice balance between historicity, play balance, simplicity, and fun."
