= Molly: An American Girl on the Home Front =

2006 American television film

- Written by: Anna Sandor
- Directed by: Joyce Chopra
- Starring: Maya Ritter; Tory Green; Hannah Fleming; Samantha Wilson; Josette Halpert; David Aaron Baker
- Composer: Chris Hajian
- Country of origin: United States
- Original language: English

Production
- Running time: 83 minutes

Original release
- Network: Disney Channel
- Release: November 26, 2006

Molly: An American Girl on the Home Front is a 2006 American made-for-television comedy-drama film. It is the third movie in the American Girl film series, and is based on the Molly: An American Girl book series written by American children's author Valerie Tripp. The first two movies in the series, Samantha: An American Girl Holiday and Felicity: An American Girl Adventure, were broadcast on The WB Television Network. However, following the WB/UPN merger, the series moved to the Disney Channel. The film premiered on the Disney Channel and on DVD from Warner Home Video on November 26, 2006. The film stars Maya Ritter in the titular role, with Molly Ringwald, David Aaron Baker, Tory Green and Genevieve Farrell in supporting roles.

The film was directed by Joyce Chopra, with Deborah Schindler as executive producer. Screenwriter Anna Sandor won the 2007 Humanitas Prize for the movie.

== Plot ==
In 1943, during World War II, nine-year-old Molly McIntire lives in the fictional town of Jefferson, Illinois with her parents, James and Helen, and two older siblings, fourteen-year-old Jill and twelve-year-old Ricky. James is a doctor in the United States Army, while Helen is a stay-at-home mom. Molly is in the third grade at Willow Street School along with her two best friends, Linda and Susan. As Molly's tenth birthday nears, she dreams of having a princess-themed tea party inspired by Princesses Elizabeth and Margaret Rose of England, only to be disappointed as she learns that her family does not have the money nor rations to afford it.

James takes Molly to a Victory Dance contest at the local park where he gives her a locket. Later that night during an air raid drill, James reveals that he has decided to go to London to provide medical aid to soldiers and civilians. Molly is furious that her father is leaving the family and going to a "strange" and "unsafe" city. James comforts Molly by calling her his North Star and telling her to look at the stars to think of him. After James departs to Europe, Helen decides to enter the workforce to do her part for the war effort, taking a factory job at the fictional Jefferson Aircraft Plant. The McIntire's neighbor, Mrs. Gilford, begins coming over in the daytime to watch the children while Helen is away at work. Molly then decides she wants to be the school's "Miss Victory", the lead tap-dance performer in the school's Christmas Pageant. She struggles to improve her tap-dancing, but with the help of her teacher Ms. Campbell, she begins to see improvement.

Soon after, the McIntires take in a British girl named Emily Bennett. Molly is unaccepting of the McIntire's new guest while Jill insists she must learn to adapt to her new situation and do her part. Fascinated by Emily, Molly's friends Linda and Susan question Emily about her home in London; overwhelmed, Emily lies and says her parents are royalty, and that she lived in "Bennett Manor". At school, Emily becomes popular amongst the students, particularly with Molly's tap-dancing rival Allison Hargate. This causes Molly to resent her. The two later participate in a spelling bee together. Before a winner can be declared, a member of the Western Union arrives to inform Ms. Campbell, who is on the panel of judges, that her fiancé has been killed in the war.

Later, another air raid drill occurs, upsetting Emily as the McIntires shelter in the basement of their home. That night, Emily wakes up in the midst of a nightmare. She reveals to Molly that her street was bombed in The Blitz, destroying her parents' apartment and killing her mother. She says her father is a bus driver and that they lived above a candy shop, and that she was never really royalty. Molly forgives her and the two become friends.

After returning home from school one day, Molly finds her mother Helen making a casserole for Mrs. Gilford, whose son has been killed in action. Empathetic, Molly helps her bake and deliver the casserole to Mrs. Gilford's house. Molly's Aunt Eleanor comes to stay with the McIntire's to help with the children and housework while Mrs. Gilford is grieving. Her stay is short-lived, though, as she eventually leaves for Texas to join the WASPs.

As Christmas nears, auditions for the role of "Miss Victory" conclude at school. Molly finds that she has been chosen for the lead role, but her excitement is short-lived as the McIntires receive a telegram stating her father is missing in action. The following day, Molly goes to the cinema where she sees a newsreel inspiring her to participate in the war effort at home. She helps create care packages for Allied soldiers in conjunction with the Red Cross, as well as collecting old clothes and making bandage boxes for soldiers overseas. While setting up the Christmas decorations in the house, another telegram from the Western Union arrives. It says James has been found alive but has been hospitalized, and that he will be discharged and sent home as soon as he is well enough to travel.

On Christmas Eve, Molly performs as Miss Victory at the Christmas Pageant when her father, James, surprises her after the finale. Though his leg is wounded and he relies on a cane, the family is ecstatic to see him and relieved that he is alive. The family goes home to enjoy their Christmas Eve and open presents. Molly receives a Red Cross doll while Emily receives a copy of A Christmas Carol from her father, whom James encountered while he was abroad.

== Cast ==
- Maya Ritter as Molly McIntire, the 10-year-old protagonist of the film.
- Tory Green as Emily Bennett, a girl from England who is taken in by Molly's family during the war.
- Hannah Fleming as Susan Shapiro, one of Molly's best friends.
- Samantha Somer Wilson as Linda Rinaldi, one of Molly's best friends.
- Josette Halpert as Alison Hargate, a rich, popular girl in Molly's class.
- David Aaron Baker as Dr. James McIntire, Molly's father who leaves for England to help wounded soldiers and civilians.
- Molly Ringwald as Helen McIntire, Molly's mother who takes a job assembling war machinery after Dr. McIntire leaves.
- Genevieve Farrell as Jill McIntire, Molly's 14-year-old sister.
- Andrew Chalmers as Ricky McIntire, Molly's 12-year-old brother.
- Thomas Brodie-Sangster as boy in spelling bee

== Production ==
Before scriptwriting for the movie began, screenwriter Anna Sandor began by reviewing and reading the original Molly book series written by children's author Valerie Tripp. Various changes were made from the books in order to adapt the series into a single movie, such as removing Molly's five-year-old brother Brad and changing elements of Emily's backstory. After the script was completed, casting began in New York, Los Angeles, and Toronto. Twelve-year-old Maya Ritter, who had previously appeared on the Disney Channel as Zoe in Disney Bumpers, as well as Zelly in Finn's Girl, was cast in the lead role as Molly. Additionally, due to Ritter's young age at the time of a filming and strict child labor laws, acting double McKayla Kenny was cast to replace Ritter in several shots during long work days. Amongst those cast was 1980s Hollywood legend Molly Ringwald, who had just returned from living in France at the time of filming.

Over thirty costumes were created or rented for Maya; over half of them were designed by Trysha Bakker, who referenced Nick Backes' and Chris Fox Payne's original Molly illustrations as well as magazines and children's clothes from the period. Additionally, Bakker collaborated with the original product designers for Molly's collection, using samples of doll clothes while designing. Although the majority of costumes featured on set were rented, others such as the Red Cross nurse uniform were sewn in-house for the movie.

Filming took place over the course of five intensive weeks during May and June 2006 in Toronto, Ontario. Most of the film was shot on a soundstage, such as the entirety of the McIntire house, while other scenes were shot on location with minimal changes done to existing environments. The downtown street, school, train station, and auditorium scenes were all shot on location in Port Hope, Ontario. Rocket Science VFX provided visual effects such as the change of seasons and the weather.
