= List of American Girl characters =

American Girl is an American line of 18-inch (46 cm) dolls released originally in 1986 by Pleasant Company (now Mattel). The dolls portray eight to thirteen-year-old girls of a variety of backgrounds. They are sold with accompanying books told from the viewpoint of the girls. Originally the stories focused on various periods of American history, but were expanded in 1995 to include contemporary characters and stories. From 2014 to 2019, the Historical line was branded as BeForever.

Below is a list of characters from the Historical series, Contemporary Characters, Girl of the Year, World by Us, and WellieWishers lines.

== Overview ==
=== Year representative releases ===
Name	Full Name	Doll Series	Years Active	Year Represented	Status
Kaya	Kaya'aton'my (She Who Arranges Rocks)	Historical	2002–present	1764	Active
Felicity Merriman		Historical	1991–2011; 2017–2019	1774	Retired
Elizabeth Cole		Historical (Best Friends)	2004–2011	1774	Retired
Caroline Abbott		Historical	2012–2015	1812	Retired
Josefina Montoya	Maria Josefina Montoya Romero	Historical	1997–present	1824	Active
Marie-Grace Gardner	Marie-Grace Rousseau Gardner	Historical	2011–2014	1853	Retired
Cécile Rey	Cécile Amélie Rey	Historical	2011–2014	1853	Retired
Kirsten Larson		Historical	1986–2010; 2021; 2024–present	1854	Cubed (Note: A "cubed" status refers to a doll that formerly had a full collection which is now only available in a limited state.)
Addy Walker	Aduke Walker	Historical	1993–present	1864	Cubed
Samantha Parkington	Samantha Mary Parkington	Historical	1986–2009; 2014–present	1904	Cubed
Nellie O'Malley		Historical (Best Friends)	2004–2009	1904	Retired
Rebecca Rubin		Historical	2009–present	1914	Active
Claudie Wells	Claudie Mae Wells	Historical	2022–present	1922	Active
Kit Kittredge	Margaret Mildred Kittredge	Historical	2000–present	1934	Active
Ruthie Smithens	Ruth Ann Smithens	Historical (Best Friends)	2008–2014	1934	Retired
Nanea Mitchell	Alice Nanea Mitchell	Historical	2017–present	1941	Active
Molly McIntire	Molly Jean McIntire	Historical	1986–2014; 2018–2019; 2021; 2022–present	1944	Cubed
Emily Bennett		Historical (Best Friends)	2006–2014	1944	Retired
Maryellen Larkin		Historical	2015–present	1954	Active
Melody Ellison	Melody Elizabeth Ellison	Historical	2016–present	1964	Active
Julie Albright	Julie Marie Albright	Historical	2007–present	1974	Active
Ivy Ling		Historical (Best Friends)	2007–2014	1974	Retired
Courtney Moore	Courtney Deborah Moore	Historical	2020–present	1986	Active
Isabel Hoffman	Isabel Jane Hoffman	Historical	2023–present	1999	Active
Nicki Hoffman	Nicki Pearl Hoffman	Historical	2023–present	1999	Active
Lindsey Bergman		Girl of the Year	2001–2002	2001	Retired
Kailey Hopkins		Girl of the Year	2003–2004	2003	Retired
Marisol Luna		Girl of the Year	2005		Retired
Jess McConnell	Jess Akiko McConnell	Girl of the Year	2006		Retired
Nicki Fleming		Girl of the Year	2007		Retired
Mia St. Clair		Girl of the Year	2008		Retired
Chrissa Maxwell	Chrissa Marie Maxwell	Girl of the Year	2009		Retired
Sonali Matthews		Girl of the Year (Companions)	2009		Retired
Gwen Thompson		Girl of the Year (Companions)	2009		Retired
Lanie Holland		Girl of the Year	2010		Retired
Kanani Akina		Girl of the Year	2011		Retired
McKenna Brooks		Girl of the Year	2012		Retired
Saige Copeland		Girl of the Year	2013		Retired
Isabelle Palmer		Girl of the Year	2014		Retired
Grace Thomas		Girl of the Year	2015		Retired
Lea Clark		Girl of the Year	2016		Retired
Gabriela McBride		Girl of the Year	2017		Retired
Luciana Vega		Girl of the Year	2018–2020	2018	Retired
Blaire Wilson		Girl of the Year	2019–2021	2019	Retired
Joss Kendrick	Jocelyn Elizabeth Kendrick	Girl of the Year	2020–2022	2020	Retired
Kira Bailey		Girl of the Year	2021–2023	2021	Retired
Corinne Tan	Corinne Mei-Ling Tan	Girl of the Year	2022–2024	2022	Retired
Gwynn Tan	Gwynn Guang Tan	Girl of the Year (Companions)	2022–2023	2022	Retired
Kavi Sharma	Kavika Sharma	Girl of the Year	2022–2024	2023	Retired
Lila Monetti		Girl of the Year	2023–present	2024	Active
Summer McKinny		Girl of the Year	2024–present	2025	Active
Raquel Reyes		Girl of the Year	2025–present	2026	Active

=== Other releases ===
Name	Full Name	Doll Series	Years Active	Status
Ashlyn	—N/a	WellieWishers	2016–present	Active
Camille	—N/a	WellieWishers	2016–present	Active
Emerson	—N/a	WellieWishers	2016–present	Active
Kendall	—N/a	WellieWishers	2016–present	Active
Willa	—N/a	WellieWishers	2016–present	Active
Bryant	—N/a	WellieWishers	2022–present	Active
Tenney Grant	Tennyson Evangeline Grant	Contemporary Characters	2017–2018	Retired
Logan Everett		Contemporary Characters	2017–2018	Retired
Z Yang	Suzanne Yang	Contemporary Characters	2017–2018	Retired
Evette Peeters		World by Us	2021–2023	Retired
Maritza Ochoa		World by Us	2021–2023	Retired
Makena Williams	Makena Lilias Cook Williams	World by Us	2021–2023	Retired

== Historical characters ==
The Historical Characters (originally known as "The American Girls Collection" or, colloquially, "Historical Characters") were initially the main focus of Pleasant Company. This product line aims to teach aspects of American history through a six-book series from the perspective of a nine-year-old girl living in that time period. Although the books are written for a target market of eight-to-thirteen-year-old girls, they endeavor to cover topics such as child labor, child abuse, poverty, racism, slavery, alcoholism, animal abuse, and war in a manner appropriate for the understanding and sensibilities of said market.

The first dolls in the American Girl/Historical line (Samantha, Kirsten and Molly) shared the same face mold but had different hair and eye colors. The first dolls were created with white muslin bodies, but these cloth bodies were changed in 1991 from a white muslin to a matching flesh tone. This accommodated the low necklines of Late Colonial/Revolutionary period gowns produced for the Felicity Merriman character (also introduced in 1991). Additional face molds were later developed for other dolls, and the line to date includes ten characters covering the period 1764 to 1999.

The "Best Friends" line was introduced in 2004; supplemental characters from the core book series were created in doll form and marketed as "best friends" for some of the Historical Characters. These Best Friend dolls share the collections of the main characters, but each has her own book, and additional products were marketed under their names. However, in May 2014, American Girl announced that Ruthie, along with Ivy, Cécile and Marie-Grace, will be retired from their historical roster, citing business reasons as they decided "to move away from the character-friend strategy within the line".

A reboot of the Historical Characters line dubbed as BeForever was launched in August 2014, complete with redesigned outfits, a two-volume compilation of previously released books, and a "Journey Book" for each character, with players taking the role of a present-day girl who found her way to the past and met up with one of the Historical girls. The line also coincided with the relaunch of Samantha Parkington, whose collection had been discontinued in 2008. On October 1, 2019, American Girl officially removed the BeForever branding from Historical Characters and by early 2020 most BeForever Central Series books were replaced with abridged Central Series books. American Girl also discontinued the My Journey books, the historical mystery books, and any remaining Best Friends books. In 2021, American Girl launched limited edition Anniversary Dolls of the first six Historical Dolls for their 35th Anniversary. They were discontinued by 2022.

Kaya'aton'my
- American Girl character
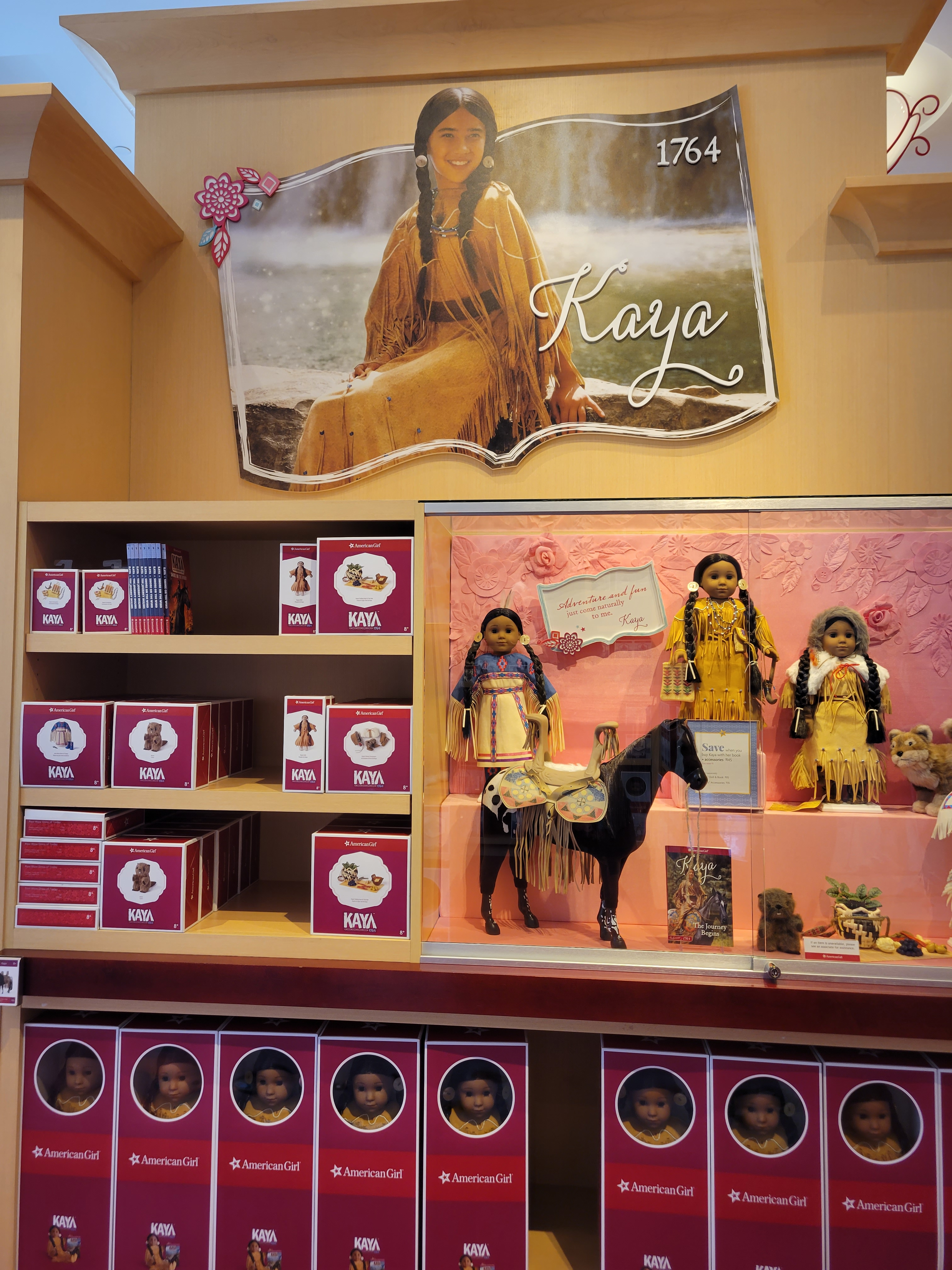
- Created by: American Girl, Janet Shaw
- Full name: Kaya'aton'my (She Who Arranges Rocks)

In-universe information
- Nicknames: Kaya, Magpie
- Family: Toe-Ta (father); Eetsa (mother); Brown Deer (older sister); Speaking Rain (adopted sister); Wing Feather (younger brother); Sparrow (younger brother); Kalutsa (paternal grandfather); Aalah (paternal grandmother); Pi-lah-ka (maternal grandfather); Kautsa (maternal grandmother); Tall Branch (maternal aunt); Cut Cheek (brother-in-law)
- Home: Pacific Northwest

=== Kaya ===
Kaya'aton'my (born August 15, 1755), known as Kaya, (pronounced Ky-yah) was originally released in 2002 and a part of the BeForever collection. In her collection, she comes with a knit blanket sweater, a deerskin outfit, a tepee and bedroll, a saddle, and a mare named Steps High, a foal named Sparks Flying, and a dog named Tatlo. Her story is based in the 1700s as a nine-year-old girl from the Nimiipuu or Nez Perce tribe living in the pre-contact Northwest. Themes in her core series focus on leadership, compassion, courage, and attachment. Chronologically, Kaya's adventures are the earliest of the historical characters. Kaya is depicted as brave and outgoing, but careless and thoughtless, and wants to be a leader of her people. Her role model is a female warrior named Swan Circling. She was created in collaboration with a consultation team that included representatives from the Nez Perce tribe.

Kaya is the only Native American doll made by American Girl to date. Kaya is the only doll in the series not to show teeth, per tribal custom. Kaya is also the first doll in the series to not follow the book naming customs established by previously released characters – the second book in the series is titled Kaya's Escape instead of Kaya Learns a Lesson. In the book series readers are introduced to Kaya's blind adopted sister, Speaking Rain, her older sister named Brown Deer, and her two twin brothers named Sparrow and Wing Feather.

=== Felicity Merriman ===
Felicity Merriman
- American Girl character
- Created by: American Girl, Valerie Tripp
- Portrayed by: Shailene Woodley

In-universe information
- Full name: Felicity Merriman
- Nickname: Lissie
- Family: Edward Merriman (father); Martha Merriman (mother); Nan Merriman (younger sister); William Merriman (younger brother); Polly Merriman (younger sister); Unnamed Maternal Grandfather †
- Religion: Christian
- Home: Williamsburg, Virginia

Felicity Merriman (born April 21, 1765) is the fourth historical character. Felicity is an auburn haired, horse-loving girl living in 1770s Williamsburg, Virginia, who is caught between Patriot and Loyalist family and friends at the onset of the American Revolution. Themes in her core books include loyalty and staying true to one's ideals.

Felicity is depicted as spunky, brave, and free-spirited, and is often fed up with the customs that young women are expected to observe at the time, much to her mother's disappointment. She can be a little brash, impatient and foolish sometimes, and sets her heart on things often. She is also quite outspoken, but will stand up to bullies, as she did with Jiggy Nye. Felicity also is not afraid to tease Annabelle Cole, her best friend Elizabeth's older sister, coming up with the name "Bananabelle". She eventually learns to be more ladylike throughout the series; however, she is still quite active.

Felicity was originally first released in 1991. Many items from Felicity's collection were retired in the early 2000s, but when Felicity's core books were dramatized for Felicity: An American Girl Adventure on November 29, 2005, new products were introduced in her collection. On August 27, 2010, American Girl announced on its website that the Felicity and Elizabeth collection would be archived. On March 28, 2011, Felicity, Elizabeth and their respective collections were officially archived. In February 2017, Felicity was re-introduced as part of BeForever, but then archived again in December 2019.

=== Elizabeth Cole ===
Elizabeth Cole
- American Girl character
- Created by: American Girl, Valerie Tripp
- Portrayed by: Katie Henney

In-universe information
- Full name: Elizabeth Cole
- Nickname: Lizzie
- Family: Mr. Cole (father); Mrs. Cole (mother); Annabelle Cole (older sister)
- Religion: Christian
- Origin: Williamsburg, Virginia (currently); Lancashire, England (birthplace)

Elizabeth Cole (born November 5, 1765) is Felicity's best friend, despite her Loyalist family leanings during the American Revolution. In spite of being quiet and shy, she is known to poke fun at her older sister Annabelle with Felicity – this stems from being teased at by Annabelle, who gave her younger sister the nickname "Bitsy". Elizabeth is also shown to be somewhat wealthier, as evidenced by having a larger home, a larger garden, and fancier clothing.

The Elizabeth doll was introduced in August 2005 as the second Best Friend doll with a book written by author Valerie Tripp, and the character was prominently featured in Felicity: An American Girl Adventure. In the original Felicity book illustrations, Elizabeth had brown hair and eyes but the character's appearance was revised to have blue eyes and blonde hair with the release of the Felicity DVD and Elizabeth doll. Later editions of the Felicity books were re-illustrated to reflect these changes and edit Elizabeth's physical description. On August 27, 2010, American Girl announced that Elizabeth and her collection would be archived with Felicity, which took place in March 2011.

=== Caroline Abbott ===
Caroline Abbott
- American Girl character
- Created by: American Girl, Kathleen Ernst

In-universe information
- Full name: Caroline Abbott
- Family: John Abbott (father); Mama Abbott (mother); Aaron Livingston (maternal uncle); Martha Livingston (maternal aunt); Grandmother Livingston (maternal grandmother); Lydia Livingston (maternal cousin); Oliver Livingston (maternal cousin)
- Home: Sackets Harbor, New York

Caroline Abbott (born October 22, 1802) is a nine-year-old girl from 1812 Sackets Harbor, New York. The only daughter of a shipbuilder who owned a shipyard near Lake Ontario, Caroline enjoys outdoor activities, like sailing and ice-skating, and dreams of being a captain of her own ship. One day, while Caroline and her father are sailing with her cousins, the War of 1812 breaks out and her father is captured. Before he is taken away, he makes Caroline promise to be brave and to take care of her family. Later, she visits him in prison and gives him clues to how he may escape. While out in the woods one day, she discovers her father, desperately ill, and nurses him back to health. She also helps her mother defend Sackets Harbor when it is attacked by British troops. Caroline learns about courage and pride and about making wise decisions throughout the stories. Themes include bravery, family, and making wise decisions. Caroline was released in 2012 during the 200th anniversary of the War of 1812. Caroline was archived along with her collection in 2015. Her Mini Doll and books are still available for purchase. American Girl has already created her BeForever version books.

=== Josefina Montoya ===
Josefina Montoya
- American Girl character
- Created by: American Girl, Valerie Tripp

In-universe information
- Full name: Maria Josefina Montoya
- Family: Andres Montoya (father); Maria Montoya (mother) †; Dolores Romero (maternal aunt/step-mother); Ana Montoya (older sister); Francisca Montoya (older sister); Clara Montoya (older sister); Magdalena Montoya (paternal aunt, godmother); Felipe Romero (maternal grandfather); Maria Herrera (maternal grandmother); Antonio Montoya (nephew); Juan Montoya (nephew)
- Religion: Christian, Catholic
- Home: Santa Fe, New Mexico

Josefina Montoya (born March 19, 1815) is a young Mexican girl living on a ranch in 1824 Santa Fe, New Mexico, with her extended family. She and her family (including her oldest sister, Ana who is married to Tomas and has two sons, and her two other sisters, headstrong Francisca and practical and sensible Clara) must adapt following the death of their mother before the books and the introduction of their mother's sister, Tía Dolores (who later marries Josefina's widowed father), to the family circle. Josefina dreams of becoming a healer like her grandmother and is taught this by her aunt, Magdalena, her father's sister. Josefina has a pet goat named Sombrita. Themes include adjustment to loss, the day-to-day life of the Mexican people, and the cultural and societal changes and influences that occurred once Mexico opened trade routes in collaboration with the US. Josefina's family speaks Spanish and there are Spanish words and phrases in her books that are defined in the glossary. Josefina was released in 1997. Josefina is American Girl's first Latina doll. In May 2024 it was announced that Josefina would be re-released with her original outfits as part of a tribute collection.

=== Marie-Grace Gardner ===
Marie-Grace Gardner
- American Girl character
- Created by: American Girl, Sarah Masters Buckey

In-universe information
- Full name: Marie-Grace Rousseau Gardner
- Nicknames: Ti-Marie, Grace, Marie-the-Great
- Family: Thaddeus Gardner (father); Mama Gardner (mother) †; Daniel Gardner (younger brother) †; Luc Rousseau (maternal uncle); Océane Rousseau (maternal aunt)
- Home: New Orleans, Louisiana

Marie-Grace Gardner (born March 3, 1843) is a girl from 1850s New Orleans. Similar to Josefina, her mother died before the events of the series. She makes a friend with Cécile Rey in her first days in New Orleans, although the latter is not interested at first. However, changes are in the air. Soon, Marie-Grace's singing teacher is found sick with yellow fever. Her father, who is a doctor, saves not only the teacher, but others with his help. Marie-Grace also rescues a baby and forms a close bond with other children. Themes include the loss of family and caring for others in need. Both Marie-Grace and Cécile were released in 2011 and archived in summer 2014. Though Marie-Grace and Cécile are best friends, they shared the same level of importance and a few items in their collection as well as a book, unlike other Best Friend characters. Marie-Grace was archived with Cecile, Ivy, and Ruthie in 2014 to make room for BeForever and the return of Samantha.

=== Cécile Rey ===
Cécile Rey
- American Girl character
- Created by: American Girl, Denise Lewis Patrick

In-universe information
- Full name: Cécile Amélie Rey
- Nickname: Cécé
- Family: Jean-Claude Rey (father); Aurélia Rey (mother); Armand Rey (older brother); Henry Tay (maternal uncle) †; Octavia Tay (maternal aunt); Simon Rey (paternal grandfather); René Tay (maternal cousin)
- Home: New Orleans, Louisiana

Cécile Rey (born May 28, 1843) is from a rich African American family from New Orleans, Louisiana in the 1850s. She loves listening to her grandfather's tales about the sea. She meets Marie-Grace during one of her singing lessons. At first, she is not fond of her because she is white, but eventually warms up to her and becomes her best friend. When yellow fever strikes her brother, she decides to use her gifts to help him and others. Themes include the loss of family and caring for others in need, and volunteering. Cecile speaks French and her French words are described in the glossary in the back of her book. Though Cécile Rey and Marie-Grace are best friends, they shared the same level of importance and a few items in their collection as well as a book, unlike other Best Friend characters. Cecile was released in 2011, making her the second African American character introduced by American Girl, the first being Addy and the third being Melody. Cecile was archived with Marie-Grace, Ivy, and Ruthie in 2014, three years after her release, to make room for BeForever and the return of Samantha.

Kirsten Larson
- American Girl character
- Created by: American Girl, Janet Beeler Shaw

In-universe information
- Family: Anders Larson (father); Greta Larson (mother); Lars Larson (older brother); Peter Larson (younger brother); Britta Larson (younger sister); Olav Larson (paternal uncle); Inger Larson (paternal aunt); Lisbeth Larson (paternal cousin); Anna Larson (paternal cousin)
- Religion: Lutheran
- Home: Minnesota (currently); Ryd, Sweden (birthplace)
- Nationality: Swedish

=== Kirsten Larson ===
Kirsten Larson (born June 8, 1845) is a Swedish immigrant who settles in the Minnesota Territory with her extended family in 1854. She faces hardships and challenges, including those necessary to adjust to life in America, such as learning to speak English. Kirsten begins to attend a single-room schoolhouse near her home, and she and her family do their best to preserve their traditions from Sweden while adapting to American life. More changes include making a new friend outside of her own "world" and the arrival of a new baby. Kirsten was one of the first three dolls produced by American Girl in 1986. Unlike many of the dolls, Kirsten's books have maintained their original illustrations (with the exception of the covers). In the fall of 2009, American Girl announced that Kirsten would be retiring soon. Kirsten was officially archived on the American Girl website on January 1, 2010. Kirsten was brought back for a short time in 2021 for the 35th anniversary release, and in May 2024 it was announced that Kirsten would be available again with her original outfits.

=== Addy Walker ===
Addy Walker
- American Girl character
- Created by: American Girl, Connie Porter

In-universe information
- Full name: Aduke Walker
- Nickname: Addy
- Family: Ben Walker (father); Ruth Walker (mother); Sam Walker (older brother); Esther Walker (younger sister); Lula Morgan (aunt, fictive kin); Solomon Morgan (uncle, fictive kin)
- Religion: Christian
- Home: Philadelphia, Pennsylvania

Addy Walker (born April, 1855) is the fifth historical character released in 1993. She is a fugitive slave who escapes with her mother from a plantation in North Carolina to Philadelphia, Pennsylvania, in 1864, during the American Civil War. Addy's stories explore themes of freedom, familial love, prejudice and racism. The six-book series was written by Connie Porter and originally illustrated by Melodye Rosales and Bradford Brown, but were later redrawn by Dahl Taylor. A stage adaptation of Porter's Addy book series was commissioned and produced by the Seattle Children's Theater in 2007. Addy: An American Girl Story was subsequently taken on a limited national tour from January through May 2008 through Kids Entertainment, Inc. Addy was the first African American historical character made by American Girl, the second being Cecile, the third being Melody and the fourth being Claudie. In May 2024 it was announced that Addy would be re-released with her original outfits as part of a tribute collection.

=== Samantha Parkington ===
Samantha Parkington
- American Girl character
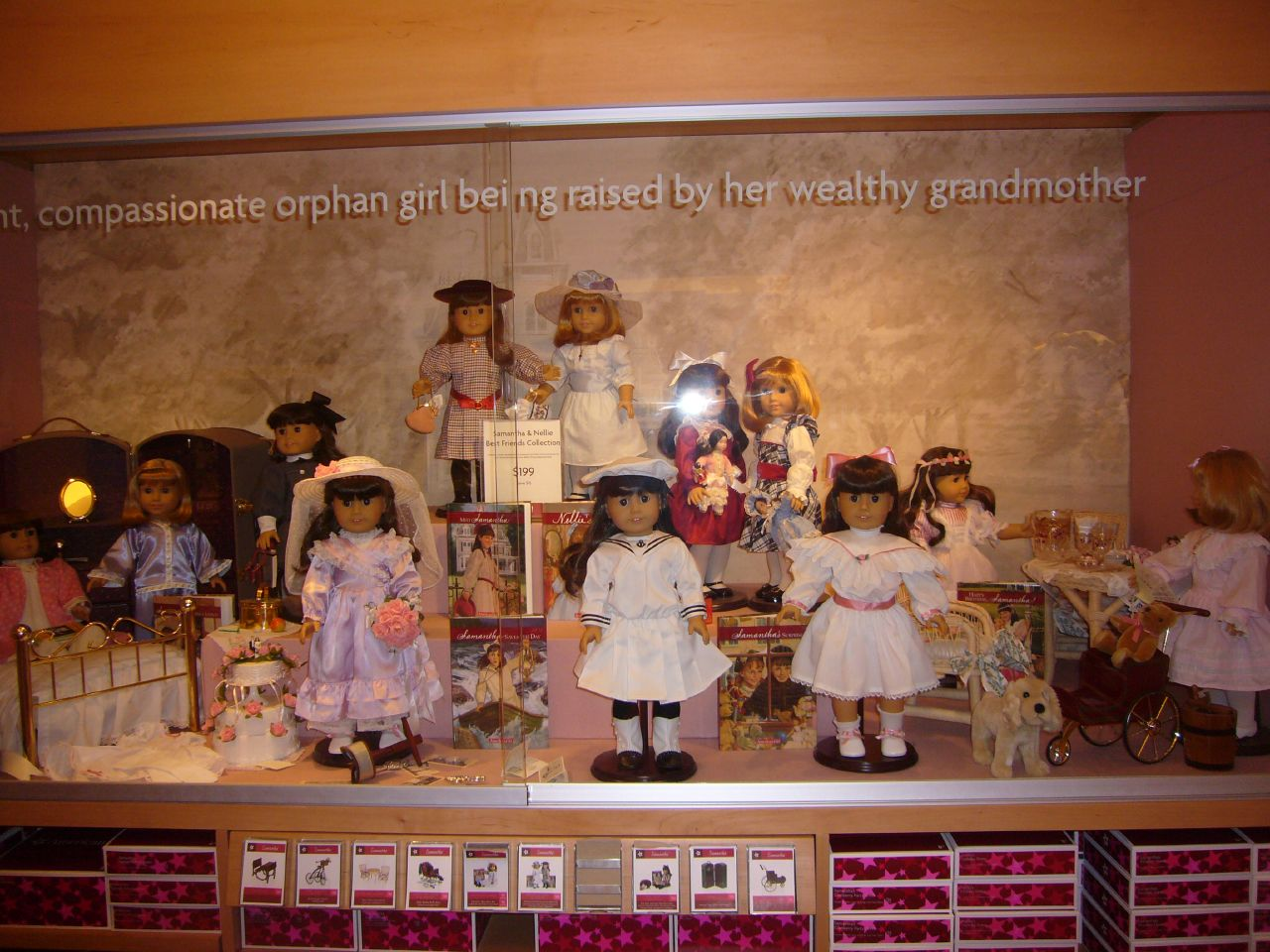
- Created by: American Girl, Susan S. Adler, Valerie Tripp
- Portrayed by: AnnaSophia Robb

In-universe information
- Full name: Samantha Mary Parkington
- Nickname: Sam
- Family: Mr. Parkington (father); Lydia Parkington (mother); Cornelia Edwards (maternal aunt/adoptive mother); Gardner Edwards (maternal uncle/adoptive father); Nellie O'Malley (adoptive younger sister); Bridget O'Malley (adoptive younger sister); Jenny O'Malley (adoptive younger sister); William Samuel Edwards (adoptive younger brother); Agatha Pitt (adoptive aunt); Agnes Pitt (adoptive aunt); William Edwards (maternal grandfather); Mary Edwards (maternal grandmother); Archibald Beemis (maternal step-grandfather); Raquel Reyes (great-great granddaughter)
- Home: New York City, New York (currently); Mount Bedford, New York (formerly)

Samantha Parkington (born May 26, 1895) is one of the first three dolls produced by American Girl in 1986. Samantha is an only child born at the end of the Gilded age and grew up through the Progressive era (although American Girl erroneously designated her as Victorian, which was a period in the history of the British Empire). Samantha's parents were killed in a boating accident when she was five. She was then raised by her wealthy grandmother, Mary Edwards, whom she called Grandmary, in fictional Mount Bedford, New York, Samantha befriends a poor servant girl named Nellie O'Malley. Eventually Samantha, Nellie and Nellie's young sisters are adopted by Samantha's uncle Gardner Edwards and aunt Cornelia. The themes of Samantha's books include women's suffrage, child labor, and classism. Red Om Productions produced Samantha: An American Girl Holiday, in cooperation with American Girl. The show premiered on WB Television Network in November 2004 and was released to DVD soon thereafter. Her books were written by Susan Adler, Maxine Rose Schur, and Valerie Tripp.

American Girl introduced the concept of "archiving" in October 2008 when it announced plans to cease production of Samantha and her collection (including Nellie). Samantha was then officially archived on May 31, 2009, but was later re-introduced in August 2014 as part of the BeForever reboot.

=== Nellie O'Malley ===
Nellie O'Malley
- American Girl character
- Created by: American Girl, Susan S. Adler, Valerie Tripp
- Portrayed by: Kelsey Lewis

In-universe information
- Family: Mr. O'Malley † (father); Mrs. O'Malley † (mother); Cornelia Edwards (adoptive mother); Gardner Edwards (adoptive father); Samantha Parkington (adoptive sister); Bridget O'Malley (younger sister); Jenny O'Malley (younger sister); William Samuel Edwards (adoptive younger brother); Agatha Pitt (adoptive aunt); Agnes Pitt (adoptive aunt); Mike O'Malley (uncle); Mary Edwards (adoptive maternal grandmother); Archibald Beemis (adoptive maternal step-grandfather)
- Religion: Christianity or Catholicism
- Home: New York City, New York (currently); Mount Bedford, New York (formerly)

Nellie O'Malley (born October 15, 1895) is Samantha's best friend, is an Irish immigrant who works for Samantha's neighbors and is befriended by Samantha. Living in a New York City settlement house, she personifies the working-class immigrant experience of the time and teaches Samantha about the conditions faced by children who are part of the work force. Nellie and her sisters, Bridget and Jenny, are orphaned and later adopted by Samantha's relatives, Gardner and Cornelia Edwards. In 2004, American Girl introduced a new line of Best Friend dolls; Nellie O'Malley debuted as Samantha's Best Friend in conjunction with the Samantha DVD release. Nellie was marketed with a small collection of clothing and a book written by Valerie Tripp, Nellie's Promise, which chronicles the character's growth and adjustment to her recent adoption. As Nellie was part of Samantha's collection, she was archived at the same time as Samantha. In 2014, with the return of Samantha and the release of BeForever, American Girl decided to move away from the Best Friends line.

=== Rebecca Rubin ===
Rebecca Rubin
- American Girl character
- Created by: American Girl, Jacqueline Dembar Greene

In-universe information
- Nickname: Beckie
- Family: Louis Rubin (father); Vera Rubin (mother); Sadie Rubin (older sister); Sophie Rubin (older sister); Victor Rubin (older brother); Benny Rubin (younger brother); Jacob Rubin (paternal uncle); Fannie Rubin (paternal aunt); Bubbie Shereshevsky (maternal grandmother); Grandpa Shereshevsky (maternal grandfather); Josef Rubin (paternal cousin); Michael Rubin (paternal cousin); Ana Rubin (paternal cousin); Max Shepard (maternal cousin)
- Religion: Judaism
- Home: New York City, New York

Rebecca Rubin (born April 4, 1905) is the tenth historical character, debuted on May 31, 2009. She is a 9-year-old Russian Jewish girl whose maternal grandparents and parents immigrated to the Lower East Side of New York City in 1914. Rebecca is fascinated by both various new American customs and the then-budding film industry, and aspires to become an actress despite her family's disapproval, though she treasures and celebrates her family's Jewish traditions. Her six-book series was written by Jacqueline Dembar Greene and focuses on issues related to assimilation of immigrants while maintaining familial, religious, and cultural traditions. Rebecca is the first Jewish Historical Character, but the second Jewish character made by American Girl.

=== Claudie Wells ===
Claudie Wells
- American Girl character
- Created by: American Girl, Brit Bennett

In-universe information
- Full name: Claudie Mae Wells
- Family: Ellis Wells (father); Gloria Wells (mother); Jody Wells (younger brother); Grandma (maternal grandmother); Cousin Sidney (cousin); Ross (cousin); Mavis (cousin)
- Home: Harlem, New York

Claudie Wells (born May 5, 1913) is the eighteenth historical character and the fourth black doll in the collection. She is a 9-year-old black girl growing up in 1922 in New York City's Harlem neighborhood during the Harlem Renaissance. Claudie is surrounded by talented musicians, painters, and performers. The Claudie collection includes furniture, a bakery, a plush dog, a kick scooter, a Baby Ruth candy bar, three special-edition outfits, and several other accessories.

The character was created in 2022 by Brit Bennett and American Girl. The American Girl team approached Bennett about writing for them after seeing tweets of Bennett's about wanting to write an American Girl book. Bennett has said that she was a fan of the American Girl book series and dolls as a child, especially the character of Addy, and the book series written by Connie Porter. She collaborated with a board of researchers and historians to create the character and her stories. She has written two books in this series, Meet Claudie (2022) and Adventures with Claudie (2023).

=== Kit Kittredge ===
Kit Kittredge
- American Girl character
- Created by: American Girl, Valerie Tripp
- Portrayed by: Abigail Breslin

In-universe information
- Full name: Margaret Mildred Kittredge
- Nickname: Kit
- Family: Jack Kittredge (father); Margaret Kittredge (mother); Charles Kittredge (older brother); Hendrick Frosbythe (maternal great-uncle); Millie Morrison (paternal great-aunt, fictive kin)
- Home: Cincinnati, Ohio

Kit Kittredge (born May 19, 1923) is the seventh historical character. She is a 9-year-old girl who experiences the hard times of the early-to-mid years of the Great Depression in Cincinnati, Ohio, as her family struggles to adjust to the realities of the economy after her father's job loss.

Kit was named after her mother and her Aunt Millie. Unlike her best friend Ruthie, Kit is a tomboy who cares less about dresses, chores and things that she considers as "flouncy", and is more inclined toward baseball, especially Ernie Lombardi of the Cincinnati Reds, the great outdoors, such as country life, and typing up her own news reports. Kit hates change, and dislikes being dependent on charities, instead preferring to learn how to catch the big fish herself, which spurs her fascination with Amelia Earhart. She dreams of becoming a reporter one day. The books also depict her as being stubborn and somewhat fussy, as she finds chores around the house to be rather tedious, but eventually regrets it after realizing her family's misfortunes, and learns to be more supportive and helpful. Kit was released in 2000. In 2023, American Girl rereleased Kit in her original meet outfit along with some of her original outfits to honor Kit's 100th birthday.

Kit's core series of books was written by Valerie Tripp and illustrated by Walter Rane. A feature film Kit Kittredge: An American Girl was released to theaters on July 2, 2008, starring Abigail Breslin in the title role. Many new items were added to Kit's collection as product tie-ins to the movie. Two video games based on her stories were also developed and published, namely American Girl: Kit Mystery Challenge! for the Nintendo DS, and the point-and-click adventure game A Tree House of My Own for Microsoft Windows platforms.

=== Ruthie Smithens ===
Ruthie Smithens
- American Girl character
- Created by: American Girl, Valerie Tripp
- Portrayed by: Madison Davenport

In-universe information
- Full name: Ruth Ann Smithens
- Nicknames: Ruthie, Goofy Ruthie
- Family: Stan Smithens (father); Lily Smithens (mother); Nancy Smithens (maternal aunt)
- Home: Cincinnati, Ohio

Ruthie Smithens (born August 22, 1923) is Kit Kittredge's best friend. The only daughter of a banker, Ruthie (and her family) is not financially affected by the Depression. Although they did at times offer help to the Kittredges, it was mostly in ways that would not hurt their pride. She is depicted to have an affinity for princesses and fairy tales, most especially Andrew Lang's Fairy Books and Grimms' Fairy Tales, in contrast to Kit's more tomboyish personality. Despite their major differences, Ruthie is a loyal and courageous friend who will go to great lengths to help Kit. Ruthies accessories included a black purse, a hankie, two rose-shaped barrettes, and a watch.

Ruthie, along with Ivy, Cécile and Marie-Grace, was retired in August 2014 following the company's decision to discontinue the Best Friends line.

=== Nanea Mitchell ===
Nanea Mitchell
- American Girl character
- Created by: American Girl, Kirby Larson

In-universe information
- Full name: Alice Nanea Mitchell
- Nickname: Beckie
- Family: Richard Mitchell (father); May Mitchell (mother); David Mitchell (older brother); Mary Lou Mitchell (older sister); Tutu (maternal grandmother); Tutu Kane (maternal grandfather)
- Religion: Christian
- Home: Honolulu, Hawaii

Nanea Mitchell (born April 11, 1932) is the sixteenth historical character and the 3rd BeForever exclusive. She is from Honolulu growing up in the early 1940s representing the bombings at Pearl Harbor that ushered the U.S. out of the Great Depression and into World War II. She may be the youngest in her Ohana (family), but she still wants to be useful and help. But before she can prove that she is ready for more responsibility, Japan attacks the military base in Pearl Harbor where her father works. Nanea was released in 2017. Nanea Mitchell was inspired by Dorinda Makanaonalani Nicholson, who lived in Hawaii and was six years old at the time of the Pearl Harbor attack.

=== Molly McIntire ===
Molly McIntire
- American Girl character
- Created by: American Girl, Valerie Tripp
- Portrayed by: Maya Ritter

In-universe information
- Full name: Molly Jean McIntire
- Family: James McIntire (father); Helen McIntire (mother); Jill McIntire (older sister); Ricky McIntire (older brother); Brad McIntire (younger brother); Frank Culver (maternal grandfather); Grammy Culver (maternal grandmother); Eleanor Culver (maternal aunt)
- Religion: Christian
- Home: Jefferson, Illinois

Molly McIntire (born April 22, 1934) is a young girl living in a fictional city named Jefferson, Illinois during the later years of World War II. Her father is stationed in England as a doctor caring for wounded soldiers, and her mother works at the Red Cross. She and her three siblings Jill, Ricky, and Brad are all cared for by their neighbor and housekeeper Mrs. Gilford, and she must cope with the many changes that the war has brought. Molly also realizes that she, too, has a part of helping soldiers. Despite those changes, Molly has some leisure activities as well, such as skating, tap-dancing, movies and summer camp. Molly's series focuses on patriotism and the changes that come with wartime. Molly was one of the original three dolls offered by Pleasant Company that was released in 1986 and is the only historical character sold with eyeglasses. In early July 2013, American Girl announced plans to archive Molly and Emily. Both were archived on December 31, 2013, though Molly's mini doll and books were re-released in February 2018 as part of the BeForever line. Molly was temporarily re-released as part of American Girl's 35th Anniversary. In 2022, Molly was officially re-released with her original book and select items from her original collection.

=== Emily Bennett ===
Emily Bennett
- American Girl character
- Created by: American Girl, Valerie Tripp
- Portrayed by: Tory Green

In-universe information
- Full name: Emily Bennett
- Family: Dad (father); Mum (mother); Aunt Primrose (aunt); Grandy (maternal grandfather); Grandmum (maternal grandmother)
- Home: Jefferson, Illinois; England (homeland)

Emily Bennett (born September 29, 1933) is a British girl who is sent to America by her family to protect her from the intensity of the English battlefront during World War II. Originally a minor character temporarily residing with the McIntires in the book Happy Birthday, Molly!, Emily's character was expanded in a book by Valerie Tripp called Brave Emily for her debut as the third doll in the Best Friends collection on September 5, 2006. Emily's debut coincided with the premiere of the Molly made-for-TV movie. The movie aired on Disney Channel in November/December 2006. Since Emily is a minor character and not Molly's best friend, she was marketed instead as "Molly's English friend". As Emily was a part of Molly's collection, she was archived along with Molly in 2013.

=== Maryellen Larkin ===
Maryellen Larkin
- American Girl character
- Created by: American Girl, Valerie Tripp
- Portrayed by: Harlie Galloway; Alyvia Alyn Lind

In-universe information
- Full name: Maryellen Larkin
- Nicknames: Ellie, Sport
- Family: Stan Larkin (father); Kay Larkin (mother); Joan Larkin Ross (older sister); Carolyn Larkin (older sister); Beverly Larkin (younger sister); Tom Larkin (younger brother); Mikey Larkin (younger brother); Grandpop (maternal grandfather); Grandmom (maternal grandmother); Jerry Ross (brother-in-law)
- Home: Daytona Beach, Florida

Maryellen Larkin (born May 7, 1945) is the fourteenth Historical Character by American Girl, representing the 1950s. She was released on August 27, 2015, and is the first exclusive BeForever character, and was made to replace Caroline Abbott. Hailing from Daytona Beach, Florida, Maryellen is an enthusiastic and imaginative girl, longing to stand out but often feels lost in the shuffle of her big, busy family. Her favorite TV shows include Davy Crockett and The Lone Ranger, and she dreams up episodes where she gets to be the hero. Maryellen has strawberry-blonde hair with bangs up in a ponytail and green eyes. All three of her books, written by Valerie Tripp, were released on August 27, 2015.

A short film based on her stories, with newcomer Harlie Galloway playing the title character, was uploaded on the video sharing site YouTube in November 2015 as part of American Girl's venture into digital content and independent film production. In addition to the short, a direct-to-video special entitled An American Girl Story - Maryellen 1955: Extraordinary Christmas, starring Alyvia Alyn Lind as Maryellen Larkin and was released by Amazon to Prime subscribers on November 25, 2016.

=== Melody Ellison ===
Melody Ellison
- American Girl character
- Created by: American Girl, Denise Lewis Patrick
- Portrayed by: Marsai Martin

In-universe information
- Full name: Melody Elizabeth Ellison
- Nicknames: Dee-Dee, Baby Chick
- Family: Will Ellison (father); Frances Ellison (mother); Yvonne Ellison (older sister); Dwayne Ellison (older brother); Lila Ellison (older sister); Frank Porter (maternal grandfather); Geneva Porter (maternal grandmother); Tish Porter (cousin); Charles Porter (cousin); Valerie Porter (cousin)
- Home: Detroit, Michigan

Melody Ellison (born January 1, 1954) is the fifteenth historical character and was released in 2016. She is a nine-year-old girl living with her family in Detroit, Michigan, during the civil rights movement in the early 1960s. Her parents are Will, who works in an auto assembly line, and Frances. Frances' parents (Melody's grandparents) are Frank Porter, a florist; and "Big Momma" Porter, who teaches piano and voice. Melody's older brother, Dwayne, wants to be a Motown singer; her oldest sister, Yvonne, is a student at Tuskegee University; her sister, Lila, is in middle school and lives at home.

In her character's first book, No Ordinary Sound, Melody's cousins move to Detroit from Alabama; this is when Melody learns more of racial prejudice. When the 16th Street Baptist Church bombing occurs, Melody becomes fearful of going into her church, because the four little girls were in their church when they died. In time, Melody overcomes her fear.

The first book was released in January 2016, although the doll wasn't released until summer 2016; a preview of the Melody doll was aired in CBS News in February 2016. The book's advisory board included: JoAnn Watson, NAACP executive committee member; Gloria House, professor of African American Studies at the University of Michigan, Dearborn; Thomas Sugrue, professor of history at New York University; Rebecca de Schweinitz, professor of history at Brigham Young University; and the late Julian Bond, former NAACP chairman.

A live-action web special based on her stories entitled Melody, 1963: Love Has to Win, an American Girl Story was released by Amazon Studios, starring Marsai Martin as the title character. Melody is the third African American character made by American Girl, the first being Addy and the second being Cecile.

=== Julie Albright ===
Julie Albright
- American Girl character
- Created by: American Girl, Megan McDonald, Susan McAliley
- Portrayed by: Jolie Ledford, Hannah Nordberg

In-universe information
- Full name: Julie Marie Albright
- Nicknames: Alley Oop, Jules, Cool Hands Albright, Sport
- Family: Daniel Albright (father); Joyce Albright (mother); Tracy Albright (older sister); Uncle Buddy (paternal uncle); Aunt Catherine (paternal aunt); Jimmy (paternal cousin); April (paternal cousin); Raymond Stratton (cousin); Grandpa (maternal grandfather); Grandma (maternal grandmother); Maia Albright (paternal aunt); Nadine Stratton (maternal aunt); David Stratton (maternal uncle)
- Home: San Francisco, California

Julie Albright (born May 1, 1966) is the ninth historical character. She is a 9-year-old girl growing up in San Francisco, California, in 1974–75. Her six-book series, written by Megan McDonald and illustrated by Robert Hunt, focuses on various changes and societal upheavals in American society during that time period: divorce, feminism, gender equality in school sports, environmentalism, and the disability rights movement. The America's Bicentennial celebration is also emphasized later in the series. Julie was released September 10, 2007, and is the first character portrayed from a divorced family by American Girl. In 2008, Elaine Goldsmith-Thomas reported that she was outlining a movie proposal based on Julie's story. In December 2009, Julie: An American Girl Musical was officially announced as a planned theatrical release; as of 2015, the musical has remained in development limbo. In lieu of this, a short independent film was uploaded on American Girl's YouTube account, starring Jolie Ledford in the title role.

=== Ivy Ling ===
Ivy Ling
- American Girl character
- Created by: American Girl, Megan McDonald, Susan McAliley
- Portrayed by: Grace Liu, Nina Lu

In-universe information
- Full name: Ivy Ling
- Nickname: Poison Ivy
- Family: Mr. Ling (father); Marilyn Ling (mother); Andrew Ling (older brother); Missy Ling (younger sister); Gung Gung (maternal grandfather); Po Po (maternal grandmother); Uncle Lee (paternal uncle); Henry Fong (great-uncle); Hannah Fong (great-aunt)
- Home: San Francisco, California

Ivy Ling (born February 28, 1966), Julie's best friend, is a Chinese American girl living in San Francisco. Good Luck, Ivy by Lisa Yee focuses on Ivy's conflict with her love of gymnastics and family traditions and responsibilities, and its "Looking Back" section discusses Chinese-American history. The Ivy doll debuted with Julie and was the first Best Friend doll to be released at the same time as the main character. Ivy was the only Asian American Historical character until Sonali Matthews, who was released alongside Chrissa. Ivy, along with Ruthie, Cécile and Marie-Grace, was retired in August 2014 following the company's decision to discontinue the Best Friends line.

=== Courtney Moore ===
Courtney Moore
- American Girl character
- Created by: American Girl, Kellen Hertz

In-universe information
- Full name: Courtney Deborah Moore
- Nickname: Court
- Family: Bruce Moore (father); Maureen D'Amico (mother); Mike D'Amico (step-father); Tina D'Amico (older step-sister); Rafi D'Amico (younger half-brother)
- Home: Orange Valley, California

Courtney Moore (born February 12, 1976) is the seventeenth historical character and the first new character released after the discontinuation of the BeForever line. She is a nine-year-old girl who lives in a fictional city of Orange Valley, California in 1986 (the year that American Girl was founded) along with her two best friends. Courtney enjoys hanging out at the mall, the restaurant, school, and the arcade, where she is a top scorer in Pac Man. The Courtney doll is styled in an '80s outfit and comes with other items from the '80s, including Care Bears pajamas, a Caboodles case, a Walkman, miniature Lisa Frank "like" school supplies, belt bag, and a mini Pac Man arcade game. Courtney also came with her own music video for her release date on September 15, 2020.

=== Isabel Hoffman ===
Isabel Hoffman
- American Girl character
- Created by: American Girl, Julia DeVillers, Jennifer Roy

In-universe information
- Full name: Isabel Jane Hoffman
- Family: Dave Hoffman (father); Robin Hoffman (mother); Nicki Hoffman (fraternal twin sister)
- Religion: Interfaith (Christian and Jewish)
- Home: Seattle, Washington

Isabel Hoffman (born May 22, 1990) is the twentieth historical character representing the turn of the millennium to the early 2000s. She is a nine-year-old girl who lives in Seattle, Washington, with her fraternal twin sister Nicki Hoffman. Isabel Jane Hoffman was born on May 22, 1990, to Robin and Dave Hoffman. Isabel was released in 2023 along with her twin sister Nicki Hoffman.

=== Nicki Hoffman ===
Nicki Hoffman
- American Girl character
- Created by: American Girl, Jennifer Roy, Julia DeVillers

In-universe information
- Full name: Nicki Pearl Hoffman
- Nickname: Tricky Nicki
- Family: Dave Hoffman (father); Robin Hoffman (mother); Isabel Hoffman (fraternal twin sister)
- Religion: Interfaith (Christian and Jewish)
- Home: Seattle, Washington

Nicki Hoffman (born May 22, 1990) is the nineteenth historical character representing the turn of the millennium to the early 2000s. She is a nine-year-old girl who lives in Seattle, Washington, with her fraternal twin sister Isabel Hoffman. Nicki Pearl Hoffman was born on May 22, 1990, to Robin and Dave Hoffman. Nicki was released in 2023 along with her twin sister Isabel Hoffman.

== Contemporary characters ==
Introduced in 2017, the Contemporary Characters line features characters and stories set in the present day, but unlike the limited edition Girl of the Year dolls, they are available for at least a few years before being discontinued. The line also marks the introduction of an 18-inch boy doll in the American Girl series, although the Bitty Baby and Bitty Twin lines have had boy dolls in their respective collections.

=== Tenney Grant ===
Tenney Grant
- American Girl character
- Created by: American Girl, Kellen Hertz

In-universe information
- Full name: Tennyson Evangeline Grant
- Nickname: Tenney
- Family: Ray Grant (father); Georgia Grant (mother); Mason Grant (older brother); Aubrey Grant (younger sister)
- Home: Nashville, Tennessee

Hailing from Nashville, Tennessee, Tenney Grant is an aspiring young songwriter who dreams to express herself through music. The eponymous first book in the series by Kellen Hertz focuses on her efforts at songwriting and the opportunity to perform at the famed Bluebird Cafe. Unlike dolls from the Girl of the Year line, Tenney, along with Logan Everett, were marketed as regular characters to be sold for an extended period of time than as limited edition dolls sold only for a year before being discontinued. Tenney comes with a graphic t-shirt, denim vest, maroon pleated skirt, a pair of brown boots, and her paperback book. Tenney and Logan were eventually discontinued at the end of 2018.

==== Logan Everett ====
Logan Everett
- American Girl character
- Created by: American Girl, Kellen Hertz

In-universe information
- Family: Phil Everett (father); Marlene Everett (mother); Jude Everett (brother)
- Home: Nashville, Tennessee

Tenney's sidekick and bandmate, Logan Everett is, in a break from series tradition, the first 18-inch boy doll from American Girl. Released alongside the main character in 2017, he is depicted as a drummer for Tenney's band, and as with Tenney, the Logan doll also comes with a modified hand to hold musical instruments.

=== Z Yang ===
Z Yang
- American Girl character
- Created by: American Girl, Jen Calonita, J.J. Howard

In-universe information
- Full name: Suzanne Yang
- Nicknames: Z, Suzie, Pumpkin
- Family: Mr. Yang (father); Michelle Yang (mother)
- Home: Seattle, Washington

Z Yang is an aspiring film maker and photographer, specializing in stop-motion pictures. Z is the first Korean American character made by American Girl, released in April 2017. Z story has her coming from Seattle, WA with a hobby of video and film making, more specifically stop motion videos. Z has a little spotted dog as well as a scooter, a camera, and other photography accessories.

The doll is accompanied by a chapter book series. Z was discontinued at the end of 2018, along with Tenney Grant, Logan Everett, and Girl of the Year 2017 Gabriela McBride.

== Girl of the Year dolls ==
Starting in 2001, American Girl began producing a "Girl of the Year" doll that was exclusive to that year. Lindsey was on sale from 2001 to mid-2002 but a 2002 doll was not produced due to lack of sales. Then Kailey was on sale from 2003-mid-2004. After that they were exclusively produced and on sale only during the year of their origination. The Girl of the Year is available until December 31, or until supplies last. Lindsey Bergman and Kailey Hopkins were Girl of the Year for two years – the rest, starting from 2005 by Marisol Luna, were each Girl of the Year for only one year. However, starting in 2017 with Gabriela McBride the company went back to the practice of having the Girl of the Years available for two years rather than just one. Starting in 2009 and continuing in 2012 until 2016, the Girl of the Year dolls were accompanied by films to tie in with their release. No Girl of the Year since Lea Clark in 2016 has had a movie, indicating the abandonment of modern American Girl film adaptions. From Kanani in 2011 to Lea in 2016, every character had an additional mobile app.

=== Lindsey Bergman ===
Lindsey Bergman
- American Girl character
- Created by: American Girl, Chryssa Atkinson

In-universe information
- Family: Gordon Bergman (father); Mrs. Bergman (mother); Ethan Bergman (brother); Bernie Bergman (uncle); Rhonda Bergman (aunt); Sophie Bergman (cousin)
- Religion: Jewish
- Home: Chicago, Illinois

Described as a girl "who is eager to help", Lindsey's self-titled book details the difficulties her impulsive attempts at helping with causes. The character is Jewish and the book references her brother's Bar Mitzvah experience and party plans. A small collection consisting of a scooter set and laptop accompanied her release. She is the first girl of the year released in 2001 and retired in 2002, and replaced by Kailey Hopkins. The Lindsey doll has short hair with dark brown curls and blue eyes and comes wearing a green t-shirt, a blue hoodie with black sleeves, a khaki skirt, multicolored leggings, and red boots. Her face mold is the Classic mold.

=== Kailey Hopkins ===
Kailey Hopkins
- American Girl character
- Created by: American Girl, Amy Goldman Koss

In-universe information
- Family: Pete Hopkins (father); Mrs. Hopkins (mother)
- Home: California

Kailey Hopkins lives near tide pools in California and is an avid swimmer and surfer as is Joss. When development threatens to destroy the tide pools she loves and surfs in, she and her best friend engineer a protest to make a difference. Kailey's collection included various beach outfits and accessories. She was the second girl of the year, released in 2003, retired in 2004, and replaced by Marisol Luna. The Kailey doll has light skin, blonde hair and brown eyes and comes wearing a pale blue sundress and brown sandals. Her face mold is the Classic face mold.

=== Marisol Luna ===
Marisol Luna
- American Girl character
- Created by: American Girl, Gary Soto

In-universe information
- Family: Hector Luna (father); Elise Luna (mother)
- Home: Chicago, Illinois

Marisol Luna is a nine-year-old girl who aspires to be a dancer. She moves from Chicago's Pilsen neighborhood to a suburb that does not have a dance studio where she can practice her favorite ballet folklórico dances. Introduced on January 1, 2005, Marisol had an extensive collection of dance outfits and accessories. The Marisol doll has medium skin, brown eyes, and medium brown hair and comes wearing a pink tank top, a purple wrap top, capri pants, green Mary Janes, and a purple hat.Her face mold is the Josefina Montoya mold. Marisol is the first Latina (Mexican) American Girl of the year made by American Girl; the second being Luciana.

=== Jess McConnell ===
Jess McConnell
- American Girl character
- Created by: American Girl, Mary Casanova

In-universe information
- Full name: Jess Akiko McConnell
- Family: Mr. McConnell (father); Mrs. McConnell (mother); Heather McConnell (older sister); Jason McConnell (older brother); Grandma Emi (maternal grandmother)
- Home: Houghton, Michigan, Belize

Jess McConnell accompanies her archaeologist parents on a several months-long expedition to Belize, where she learns new lessons about responsibility and the preservation of history along with learning new things about herself. To illustrate her mixed Japanese-American and Irish-Scottish heritage, the Jess doll debuted with a new face mold. The Jess doll has fair skin, dark hair, and dark brown eyes and comes wearing an orange tank top, a tie-dye skirt, and brown sandals. Jess is also the first Girl of the Year by American Girl to be explicitly biracial.

=== Nicki Fleming ===
Nicki Fleming
- American Girl character
- Created by: American Girl, Ann Howard Creel

In-universe information
- Nickname: Snicker
- Family: Mr. Fleming (father); Joan Fleming (mother); Adam Fleming (younger brother); Rebecca Fleming (younger sister); Kristine Fleming (younger sister)
- Home: Denver, Colorado

Nicki Fleming is an animal lover who loves to ski and is living on her family's Colorado ranch. Nicki volunteers to train a service dog named Sprocket when her mother cannot fulfill this responsibility due to a pregnancy. Nicki also faces friendship difficulties which test her loyalties. Nicki was the first Girl of the Year to have two books: Nicki and Thanks to Nicki, both by Ann Howard Creel. Nicki was the doll of the year in 2007. The Nicki doll has fair skin, light brown hair, blue eyes, and freckles and comes wearing a white top, blue skirt, and brown cowboy boots. Her face mold is the Classic mold.

=== Mia St. Clair ===
Mia St. Clair
- American Girl character
- Created by: American Girl, Laurence Yep

In-universe information
- Family: Tom St. Clair (father) Eve St. Clair (mother); Perry St. Clair (oldest brother); Skip St. Clair (older brother) Rick St. Clair (older brother)
- Home: New York

Mia was previewed on the November 21, 2007, episode of Oprah. The doll was subsequently released on January 1, 2008, with an extensive collection and two books: Mia and Bravo Mia, both written by Laurence Yep. Mia's stories chronicle her passion for competitive figure skating, which is at odds with her hockey-playing family. Mia is featured in a computer game (Mia Goes For Great!). In her books, Mia is a part of a poor family who works hard to ensure that all of their children (Mia and her two brothers) can pursue hockey or figure skating at the local ice rink. Mia, while much better at hockey, chooses figure skating instead so she does not live in the shadow of her brothers. The Mia doll has light skin, hazel eyes and light red hair. She comes in a light grey skirt, a magenta long sleeved sweater with a snowflake printed on the right side, and blue high-top sneakers. Her face mold is the Classic mold.

=== Chrissa Maxwell ===
Chrissa Maxwell
- American Girl character
- Created by: American Girl, Mary Casanova
- Portrayed by: Sammi Hanratty

In-universe information
- Full name: Chrissa Marie Maxwell
- Family: Paul Maxwell (father) Meg Maxwell (mother); Tyler Maxwell (older brother); Grandpa Hanlon (maternal grandfather) Louise Hanlon (maternal grandmother)
- Home: Edgewater, Minnesota

Chrissa Marie Maxwell and her collection were released on January 1, 2009. An accompanying direct-to-DVD film entitled Chrissa Stands Strong based on her story premiered January 5 and became available for purchase the next day. Chrissa's books and DVD focus on peer bullying issues. Chrissa is portrayed by actress Sammi Hanratty. Both books are written by Mary Casanova. The Chrissa doll has light skin, blue eyes and dark brown/near black hair. She comes in a pink wrap-around long sleeved dress with a floral print. Her face mold is the Josefina Montoya mold.

==== Gwen Thompson & Sonali Matthews ====
Gwen Thompson Sonali Matthews
- American Girl character
- Created by: American Girl, Mary Casanova
- Portrayed by: Kaitlyn Dever (Gwen), Ariela Barer (Sonali)

In a break with tradition for this product line, Chrissa's collection included two additional "best friend" dolls: Gwen Thompson and Sonali Matthews, neither of which had a separate collection. In the books, Gwen Thompson is disappointed in Chrissa when she believes Chrissa has revealed one of her secrets to school bullies. At first, Sonali is one of the bullies, but then learns to stand up for others. The Sonali doll has dark skin, dark brown hair, and dark brown hair and comes wearing a green t-shirt, a blue tunic, denim pants, and blue shoes. The Gwen doll has light skin, blonde hair, and dark brown eyes and comes wearing a white sundress and pink sandals. The character of Sonali debuted a new face mold, the Sonali mold, to represent her Indian heritage. Gwen's doll uses the Classic mold.

=== Lanie Holland ===
Lanie Holland
- American Girl character
- Created by: American Girl, Jane Kurtz

Lanie was released in January 2010 along with her collection. Lanie is a ten-year-old girl living in Cambridge, Massachusetts, depicted as having an affinity for science and biology and considers herself a scientist. The Lanie doll has light skin, hazel eyes, and curly blonde hair with side bangs. She comes in a blue and green striped polo dress. Her face mold is the Classic mold.

=== Kanani Akina ===
Kanani Akina
- American Girl character
- Created by: American Girl, Lisa Yee

Kanani is the ninth Girl of the Year character; she and her collection were released in 2011. Kanani is the second multiracial character, following Jess McConnell. Her father is of Japanese and Hawaiian descent, and her mother is French and German. Hailing from Kauaʻi, she helps her family run a shave ice shop and is passionate about helping people by sharing the aloha spirit and protecting Hawaiian wildlife. In Kanani's book, she rescues a monk seal, so, American Girl partnered with the National Wildlife Foundation and donated $1 for every monk seal plush toy sold. The Kanani doll has medium skin, hazel eyes, and long thigh-length light brown hair. She comes with a kukui nut necklace, a pink flower in her hair, and a light-blue floral print dress. Her face mold is the Jess McConnell mold.

=== McKenna Brooks ===
McKenna Brooks
- American Girl character
- Created by: American Girl, Mary Casanova
- Portrayed by: Jade Pettyjohn

McKenna and her collection debuted in January 2012, revolving around a gymnastics theme. She is a ten-year-old girl from Seattle, Washington, who is a budding gymnast but suffers from problems with school work. McKenna is the oldest of three children, with younger twin sisters named Maisey and Mara Brooks. She is described as strong-willed and determined, and is determined to be an Olympic gold medalist for gymnastics. A television film entitled An American Girl: McKenna Shoots for the Stars was released on July 3, 2012. The film is also the second in the series to feature a Girl of the Year character. McKenna is portrayed by actress Jade Pettyjohn. The McKenna doll has light skin, blue eyes, and long caramel colored hair. She comes in a teal and gray lap-length dress with flutter sleeves and with a ponytail at the top of her head. Her face mold is the Josefina Montoya face mold.

=== Saige Copeland ===
Saige Copeland
- American Girl character
- Created by: American Girl, Jessie Haas
- Portrayed by: Sidney Fullmer

Saige Copeland is the eleventh Girl of the Year released by American Girl in 2013, and the fourth Girl of the Year to represent an only child. Saige is in fourth grade and lives in Albuquerque, New Mexico. she has a passion for visual arts (most especially painting), and is very skilled in horseback riding like her grandmother. When Saige comes back to school, she learns that there will not be a new art class. Saige gets upset and tries to keep up her spirits and earn a new class for the school. She and her friends set out on an adventure to earn their art class back. A film based on her stories, Saige Paints the Sky, was released on July 2, 2013, as a made-for-television film. It aired on NBC on July 13, 2013. Saige was portrayed by actress Sidney Fullmer. An iOS app entitled Paint Ponies was also released to coincide with the doll's debut. The Saige doll has light skin, freckles across the bridge of her nose, blue eyes and loose auburn hair that comes in a braid. She comes in an indigo dress with a knitted geometric print belt and tan boots with belting. Her face mold is the Classic mold.

=== Isabelle Palmer ===
Isabelle Palmer
- American Girl character
- Created by: American Girl, Laurence Yep
- Portrayed by: Erin Pitt

Isabelle Palmer is the twelfth Girl of the Year released in 2014, making her debut on an episode of Good Morning America. Isabelle is an inspired dancer who lives in Washington, D.C. She is excited to attend Anna Hart School of the Arts where her older sister, Jade, has been studying ballet. Her hobbies include dancing and fashion design. She designs leotards and other clothing. She is the first Girl of the Year to have three books – Isabelle, Designs by Isabelle, and To the Stars, Isabelle, all written by Laurence Yep. A mobile app for iOS platforms entitled Isabelle's Dance Studio was also released in line with her debut. A port of the game to Android was also released in July 2014. She also is the fourth Girl of the Year to have a movie about her. Erin Pitt portrays Isabelle in the movie Isabelle Dances Into the Spotlight. The Isabelle doll has light skin, hazel eyes, and long blonde hair with detachable pink-tipped highlights. She comes in a pink shirt with a girl in a ballet position with sequins, grey capri pants, and sparkly gold shoes. Her face mold is the Classic face mold.

=== Grace Thomas ===
Grace Thomas
- American Girl character
- Created by: American Girl, Mary Casanova
- Portrayed by: Olivia Rodrigo

Grace Thomas is the thirteenth Girl Of The Year, released in 2015. An avid baker from the fictional town of Bentwick, Massachusetts, her story centers around her dreams of being an aspiring entrepreneur, with her trip to Paris as a key plot point. Grace made her debut on Good Morning America on January 1, 2015. The Grace doll has light skin with freckles across the bridge of her nose, light blue eyes, and medium brown hair with side bangs. She comes with a white print T-shirt with "Paris, Je T'aime" written in cursive script, a pink skirt with a black bow, and dark gray boots with bows. Her face mold is the Josefina mold. Some of her unique features are highlights, side bangs and permanent lip gloss. Tying in with the Grace doll is a television film based on her stories entitled Grace Stirs Up Success, starring Olivia Rodrigo as the title character, and the mobile app Grace's Sweet Shop for iOS and Android.

=== Lea Clark ===
Lea Clark
- American Girl character
- Created by: American Girl, Lisa Yee
- Portrayed by: Maggie Elizabeth Jones

Lea Clark is the fourteenth Girl Of The Year, released in 2016. She's partially Latina with her being 1/8th Brazilian. Debuting in an episode of Good Morning America, Lea is a budding photographer from St. Louis, Missouri, and is described by American Girl as an animal lover who "discovers a world of possibilities" upon visiting Brazil, culminating in a visit to her brother in the Amazon rainforest. Coinciding with her release is a film entitled Lea to the Rescue starring Maggie Elizabeth Jones as the title character, along with coordinating items such as books penned by Lisa Yee entitled Lea Dives In, Lea Leads the Way and Lea and Camila, and a mobile game for iOS. American Girl has also launched an advocacy campaign with the World Wildlife Fund called "Wild at Art", urging young girls to contribute to the fund through their artistic abilities. The Lea doll has blonde hair, fair skin, and hazel eyes and comes wearing a multicolored dress and brown sandals. Her face mold is the Josefina mold.

=== Gabriela McBride ===
Gabriela McBride
- American Girl character
- Created by: American Girl, Teresa E. Harris

Gabriela McBride is the fifteenth Girl of the Year, released in 2017. Gabriela is an aspiring poet from Philadelphia, Pennsylvania, to express her feelings to help her overcome stuttering. Gabriela loves to dance at the community center after school. She is the first African American Girl of the Year. The Gabriela doll has dark skin, brown hair, and brown eyes and comes wearing a purple shirt, a teal tank top, blue leggings, and purple shoes. Her face mold is the Sonali face mold.

=== Luciana Vega ===
Luciana Vega
- American Girl character
- Created by: American Girl, Erin Teagan

Luciana Vega is the sixteenth Girl of The Year. She was released on January 1, 2018, and is a space-loving eleven-year-old Chilean girl from Virginia who wants to be the first person to walk on Mars. Luciana is the second Latina American Girl of the Year made by American Girl, the first being Marisol. The Luciana doll has medium skin, brown eyes, and dark hair with a purple stripe and comes wearing a galaxy-pattern dress and silver boots. Her face mold is the Josefina mold.

=== Blaire Wilson ===
Blaire Wilson
- American Girl character
- Created by: American Girl, Jennifer Castle

Blaire Wilson is the seventeenth Girl of the Year, released on January 1, 2019. Hailing from the fictional town of Bluefield, New York, Blaire lives on her family's sustainable farm, which also includes a farm-to-table restaurant, B&B, and special event barn venue. She loves to cook and craft, but struggles with newly diagnosed lactose intolerance and her smart device addiction. Blaire's story is authored by Jennifer Castle across two chapter books. Her doll has a paler skin tone compared to other fair-skinned dolls, and uses the Josefina face mold. The Blaire doll has curly red hair and green eyes and comes wearing a white sundress and purple sandals.

=== Joss Kendrick ===
Joss Kendrick
- American Girl character
- Created by: American Girl, Erin Falligant

In-universe information
- Full name: Jocelyn Elizabeth Kendrick

Joss Kendrick is the eighteenth Girl of the Year, she was released on January 1, 2020. Joss is from Huntington Beach, California and loves surfing and cheerleading. She loves surfing with her friend Sofia and Murph, the bulldog, more than anything, but this is thrown for a curve when her brother, Dylan, dares her to join the cheer team in exchange for posting her video in a surfing contest. It turns out that she likes it and wants to continue the sport. She is making a video with Sofia to be able to meet her idol, Tina Hart, and show that she can ace a move called the frontside air. Joss is the first American Girl doll to have hearing loss, and American Girl worked with an advisory board, which included an audiologist and deaf surfer, to ensure her story realistically reflected Joss’s experiences. She has one removable hearing aid that is placed in her right ear and comes with a case and second hearing aid in case she loses hers. The Joss doll has fair skin, brown hair, and brown eyes and comes wearing a pink swimsuit, denim shorts, a blue hoodie, and pink sandals. Her face mold is specially designed to allow her hearing aid to be placed.

=== Kira Bailey ===
Kira Bailey
- American Girl character
- Created by: American Girl, Erin Teagan

Kira Bailey is the nineteenth Girl of the Year, was released on January 1, 2021. Kira loves animals and is eager to help at their wildlife sanctuary post the Australian wildfires. Kira is the first American Girl doll to include LGBTQ characters in her storyline. Kira helps her Great-aunts, Mamie and Lynette, at their animal sanctuary. The Kira doll has fair skin, blonde hair, and hazel eyes and comes wearing a pink shirt, green skirt, and brown boots. Her face mold is the Josefina mold.

=== Corinne Tan ===
Corinne Tan
- American Girl character
- Created by: American Girl, Wendy Wan-Long Shang
- Portrayed by: Miya Cech

In-universe information
- Full name: Corinne Mei-Ling Tan, Tan Mei-Ling
- Home: Aspen, Colorado

Corinne Tan is the twentieth Girl of the Year and was released on January 1, 2022. She is the fourth Asian doll in the line after Sonali Matthews, Jess McConnell, and Kanani Akina, and the first one to not be white-biracial. She struggles to process her parents divorce while being harassed due to her heritage. She skis and lives in Aspen, Colorado. The Corinne doll has fair skin, black hair with blue streaks, and brown eyes and comes wearing a white sweater, purple leggings, and blue boots. Her face mold, the new Corinne mold, has larger eye sockets than other face molds.

=== Gwynn Tan ===
Gwynn Tan
- American Girl character
- Created by: American Girl, Wendy Wan-Long Shang
- Portrayed by: Kai Cech

In-universe information
- Full name: Tan Guang, Gwynn Guang Tan

Corinne comes with a companion doll of her little sister, Gwynn Tan, and a stuffed version of her dog, Flurry. Gwynn uses the Emerson mold from the WellieWishers line.

=== Kavi Sharma ===
Kavi Sharma
- American Girl character
- Created by: American Girl, Varsha Bajaj

In-universe information
- Full name: Kavika Sharma

Kavi is the twenty-first Girl of the Year was released in 2022 and represents 2023. She is a South Asian American Hindu who lives in Metuchen, New Jersey. Kavi is the first South Asian American Girl doll. Kavi's identity was created by Arusha Bhargava, an eighth-grade student along with a team of advisors.

=== Lila Monetti ===
Lila Monetti
- Girl of the Year character
- Created by: American Girl, Erin Falligant

Lila is the twenty-second Girl of the Year was released in October 2023 and represents 2024. She is a 10-year-old girl from St. Paul, Minnesota who is a competitive gymnast. She has brown hair, and amber eyes. She takes care of her horse friend, Hollyhock. Lila's story is told in a novel, Lila Goes for Gold, which was released in January 2024. Her gymnastics coach is McKenna Brooks, the Girl of the Year for 2012.

=== Summer McKinny ===
Summer McKinny
- American Girl character
- Created by: American Girl, Clare Hutton

Summer is the twenty-third Girl of the Year was released in September 2024 and represents 2025. Summer is a ten year old, dog-loving, baker who creates a dog-walking and treat business in her town, Columbia, Maryland. She has blonde hair, blue eyes, and her birthday is June 21.

=== Raquel Reyes ===
Raquel Reyes
- American Girl character
- Created by: American Girl, Angela Cervantes

Raquel is the twenty-fourth Girl of the Year was released in September 2025 and represents the year 2026. She is a 10-year-old biracial half-Mexican on her father's side and half-Caucasian on her mother's side who lives in Kansas City, Missouri. Raquel loves to play pickleball and wants to be a DJ. She is the great-great-granddaughter of Samantha Parkington, one of the original American Girl dolls.

== WellieWishers ==
Current WellieWishers roster as of 2016. From left to right: Camille, Emerson, Willa, Kendall and Ashlyn.

The WellieWishers are a group of young elementary age girls who meet and play together at Aunt Miranda's backyard garden. As the name implies, dolls from the line wear Wellington boots, and have a body design distinct from the classic, Götz-derived American Girl dolls. The line was released on June 23, 2016.

Coinciding with the characters' launch is a mobile game for iOS consisting a series of minigames centering on the WellieWishers girls and their adventures, and an animated web series released in Fall 2016.

=== Ashlyn ===
Ashlyn is the group's party planner, and the most socially-active among the girls. She is described as throwing the best parties and loves to make her friends happy—and has a "princess"/very feminine side to her, wearing a predominantly pink outfit with a tiara, blouse, a tulle skirt and pink boots with gold and lace designs.

=== Bryant ===
Bryant is the first doll to be added to the WellieWishers after the initial release, and the first boy. He is described as an avid team player, being both a gymnast and member of his school's kickball team. He also has an interest in dragons; his outfit consists of a t-shirt with a green dragon on it, matching shorts and boots, and green faux wings.

=== Camille ===
Camille is a caring young girl and a good listener, Camille also has an affinity for the ocean and aquatic interests, including pretending she's a mermaid. She is depicted as a Caucasian girl with shoulder length blonde hair similar to Kit Kittredge, blue eyes, and light skin, and a mole or freckle under her left eye.

Her interests are reflected in an outfit consisting of a blue T-shirt with a ruched ribbon, a multi-colored tulle skirt, and fish-themed boots with fins on the sides.

=== Emerson ===
Emerson is the theatrically inclined member of the group, enjoying the stage and performing in front of her friends through her poems and songs to which she writes herself. She is depicted as an East Asian girl with black hair worn in two twisted buns, light skin and dark brown eyes.

Her outfit reflects this with a wrap ballet style top, star-spangled tulle skirt, and ballet shoe styled wellies. She also wears two pink tulle-trimmed ponytail holders in her hair.

=== Kendall ===
Kendall serves as the group's artist and designer, having a gift for arts, crafts and recycling old or discarded things. She appears as a black girl with dark skin, textured black hair worn in two high ponytail puffs and brown eyes. She also shows her diplomatic side at times, settling arguments and disputes when the need arises.

=== Willa ===
A tree-climber and nature lover, Willa has an interest in the outdoors, making friends with animals and being fluent in "rabbit language". Willa is depicted as a strawberry blonde styled in pigtails and a sweet set of bunny ears with beautiful hazel eyes and soft freckles. She wears a hedgehog face print tee shirt with a green, as American girl calls it, hedgehog print skirt and red ladybug wellies.

== World by Us ==
The World by Us line was released in September 2021 to focus on social justice and change through the eyes of young girls. The main characters are Evette, Maritza, and Makena who are close friends and advocates for change.

=== Evette Peeters ===
Evette Peeters
- American Girl character
- Created by: American Girl, Sharon Dennis Wyeth

Evette loves vintage clothes, upcycling, and protecting nature, including the Anacostia River near her home. When she discovers racism in her own biracial family, she works hard to heal her world—family, friends, river, and all.

The Evette doll has the Josefina face mold, medium skin, caramel hair, freckles and gray eyes.

An expert that helped with Evette's story is Katrina Lashley. She is a program coordinator at Smithsonian's Anacostia Community Museum and a leader in the Women's Environmental Leadership Initiative.

=== Maritza Ochoa ===
Maritza Ochoa
- American Girl character
- Created by: American Girl, Angela Cervantes

Maritza is an active participant in community events celebrating Latina culture and cuisine. She plays a leadership role in soccer and engages in advocacy work focused on immigrant family support and unity.

The Maritza doll has the Joss mold, medium skin, brown hair with auburn highlights, and brown eyes.

An expert that assisted with Maritza's story is M. Lucero Ortiz. She is part of Kids In Need of Defense, a U.S.-based nongovernmental organization devoted to the protection of unaccompanied and separated children. She also works as a human rights lawyer.

=== Makena Williams ===
Makena Williams
- American Girl character
- Created by: American Girl, Denise Lewis Patrick

In-universe information
- Full name: Makena Lilias Cook Williams

Makena loves art and her close-knit family, with ties tracing back to Kenya, but her real passion is fashion, which she uses to express her views. After experiencing a racist incident in her own front yard, Makena uses her style to speak up about injustice.

The Makena doll has a new face mold, the Makena mold, dark skin, black hair, and brown eyes.

An expert that advised on Makena's story is Dr. Deborah Rivas-Drake. She is a professor of psychology and education at the University of Michigan, who studies how teens navigate issues of race, ethnicity, racism, and xenophobia.
