= Valerie Tripp =

American writer (born 1951)

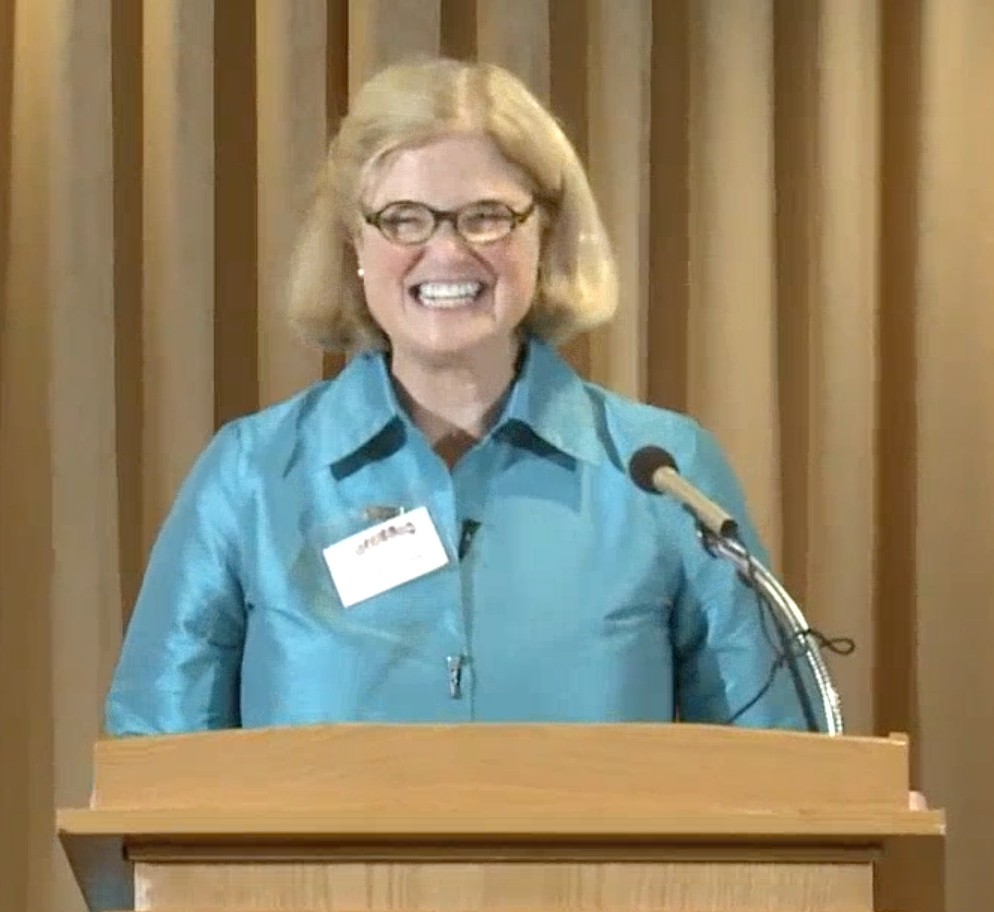
- Tripp in 2014
- Born: 1951 (age 74–75); Mount Kisco, New York, U.S.
- Occupation: Author
- Spouse: Michael Petty
- Children: 1

Valerie Tripp (born 1951) is a children's book author, best known for her work with the American Girl book series.

== Early life ==
Tripp was born in 1951. She grew up in Mount Kisco, New York, with three sisters and a brother. She graduated from Yale University, having been a member of the first co-educated class there, and has a Master of Education degree from Harvard University.

== Career ==
One year after graduating from college, Tripp was hired by close friend Pleasant Rowland to contribute to a reading program called The Superkids. Later, Rowland approached Tripp with the idea to start American Girl. Tripp helped Rowland outline and write books for the American Girl book series. She said of helping Rowland start the company, "I always hated books where it's the girl who says to the boy, 'Don't go in there!' We wanted the girls to be the ones pushing things to the limit."

Tripp wrote all the books in the original six-book Felicity, Josefina, Kit, Molly and Maryellen series, and three of the books in the Samantha series, in addition to multiple short stories following the same characters. She has also written four of the five "Best Friends" character stories to date, as well as the Wellie Wishers series and the Hopscotch Hill School books. Today, she has written most of the American Girl books, which have sold over 160 million copies. Her work on the books has won her numerous awards, including the March of Dimes Mother of the Year Award and the Children's Choice Award.

Film dramatizations of the lives of Samantha, Felicity, Molly, Maryellen and Kit have been based on her stories to varying extents.

Apart from American Girl, Tripp wrote the National Geographic Kids book series Izzy Newton and the S.M.A.R.T. Squad. She is a writer and editor for Sterling Publishing and editorial director of Boys Camp Books.

== Personal life ==
Tripp is married to Michael Petty, a part-time professor at Montgomery College, and they have one grown daughter, Katherine. She and Petty have lived in Silver Spring, Maryland since 1985.

== Selected works ==
- Classic Adventures: The Adventures of Sherlock Holmes [illustrated by Carlo Molinari], Starry Forest Books, February 2021
- Deluxe Greek Myths: Goddesses and Gardens [illustrated by Teresa Martinez], Starry Forest Books, July 2021
- Various titles, American Girl book program
