= Kit Kittredge: An American Girl =

2008 comedy film directed by Patricia Rozema

- Theatrical release poster
- Directed by: Patricia Rozema
- Written by: Ann Peacock
- Based on: the Kit series by Valerie Tripp
- Produced by: Ellen L. Brothers; Jodi Goldberg; Julie Goldstein
- Starring: Abigail Breslin; Julia Ormond; Chris O'Donnell; Glenne Headly; Jane Krakowski; Wallace Shawn; Joan Cusack; Stanley Tucci
- Cinematography: David Boyd
- Edited by: Julie Rogers
- Music by: Joseph Vitarelli
- Production companies: New Line Cinema; HBO Films; Picturehouse; American Girl Movies
- Distributed by: Warner Bros. Pictures
- Release date: July 2, 2008
- Running time: 101 minutes
- Country: United States
- Language: English
- Budget: $10 million
- Box office: $17.7 million

Kit Kittredge: An American Girl (also advertised as Kit Kittredge: An American Girl Mystery) is a 2008 American comedy-drama film directed by Patricia Rozema and written by Ann Peacock, based on the Kit Kittredge stories by Valerie Tripp. The film focuses on the American Girl character Kit Kittredge (Abigail Breslin) who lives in Cincinnati, Ohio during the Great Depression.

It is the first, and so far only, film in the American Girl film series to have a theatrical release; the first three were television films. As with the TV films, Julia Roberts served as one of the executive producers.

== Plot ==
In June 1934, Kit Kittredge is a ten-year-old girl living in Cincinnati, Ohio who is determined to become a reporter. She writes articles on the typewriter in her attic bedroom while drama unfolds on the floors beneath her. The mortgage on her house is about to be foreclosed because her father lost his car dealership and couldn't keep up with the payments. He has gone to Chicago, Illinois to search for work, and to make some income her mother takes in an odd assortment of boarders, including magician Mr. Berk, dance instructor Miss Dooley, and mobile library driver Miss Bond.

Locally there have been reports of muggings and robberies supposedly committed by hobos. Kit investigates and meets young Will and Countee, who live in a hobo jungle near the Ohio River and Erie Lackawanna Railway. Kit writes a story about the camp and tries to sell it to Mr. Gibson, the mean editor of the Cincinnati newspaper, but he has no interest in the subject. At the same time, Kit adopts a dog, her mother buys chickens, and Kit sells their eggs.

When a locked box containing her mother's treasures is stolen, a footprint with a star matching the one on Will's boot is discovered, making him the prime suspect. The sheriff goes to find Will and Countee, however, they have left the hobo jungle. Kit, Stirling and Ruthie then set out to investigate on the incidents and clear Will's name. It then turns out that Mr. Berk, along with two accomplices, were actually the ones behind the robberies, framing Will and the rest of the homeless for the crime. Kit then becomes a local hero. Afterwards, Kit finds out that Countee has been pretending to be a boy. On Thanksgiving, the homeless bring food to Kit's mother and Kit's father returns home, saying he wants to find a job where he can stay close to his family. Mr. Gibson arrives to show Kit that her article is in print in Cincinnati's major daily newspaper.

== Cast ==
- Abigail Breslin as Margaret Mildred "Kit" Kittredge
- Chris O'Donnell as Jack Kittredge
- Julia Ormond as Margaret Kittredge
- Joan Cusack as Miss Lucinda Bond
- Stanley Tucci as Mr. Jefferson Jasper Rene Berk
- Max Thieriot as Will Shepherd
- Jane Krakowski as Miss May Dooley
- Madison Davenport as Ruthie Smithens
- Zach Mills as Stirling Howard IV
- Austin MacDonald as Roger
- Willow Smith as Constance "Countee"
- Wallace Shawn as Mr. Gibson
- Glenne Headly as Mrs. Howard
- Colin Mochrie as Mr. Pennington
- Kenneth Welsh as Uncle Hendrick
- Brieanne Jansen as Frances Stone
- Erin Hilgartner as Florence Stone
- Martin Roach as Hobo Doctor
- Elisabeth Perez as Classmate #1
- Jordan Rackley as Classmate #2
- Dylan Scott Smith as Frederich

== Development ==
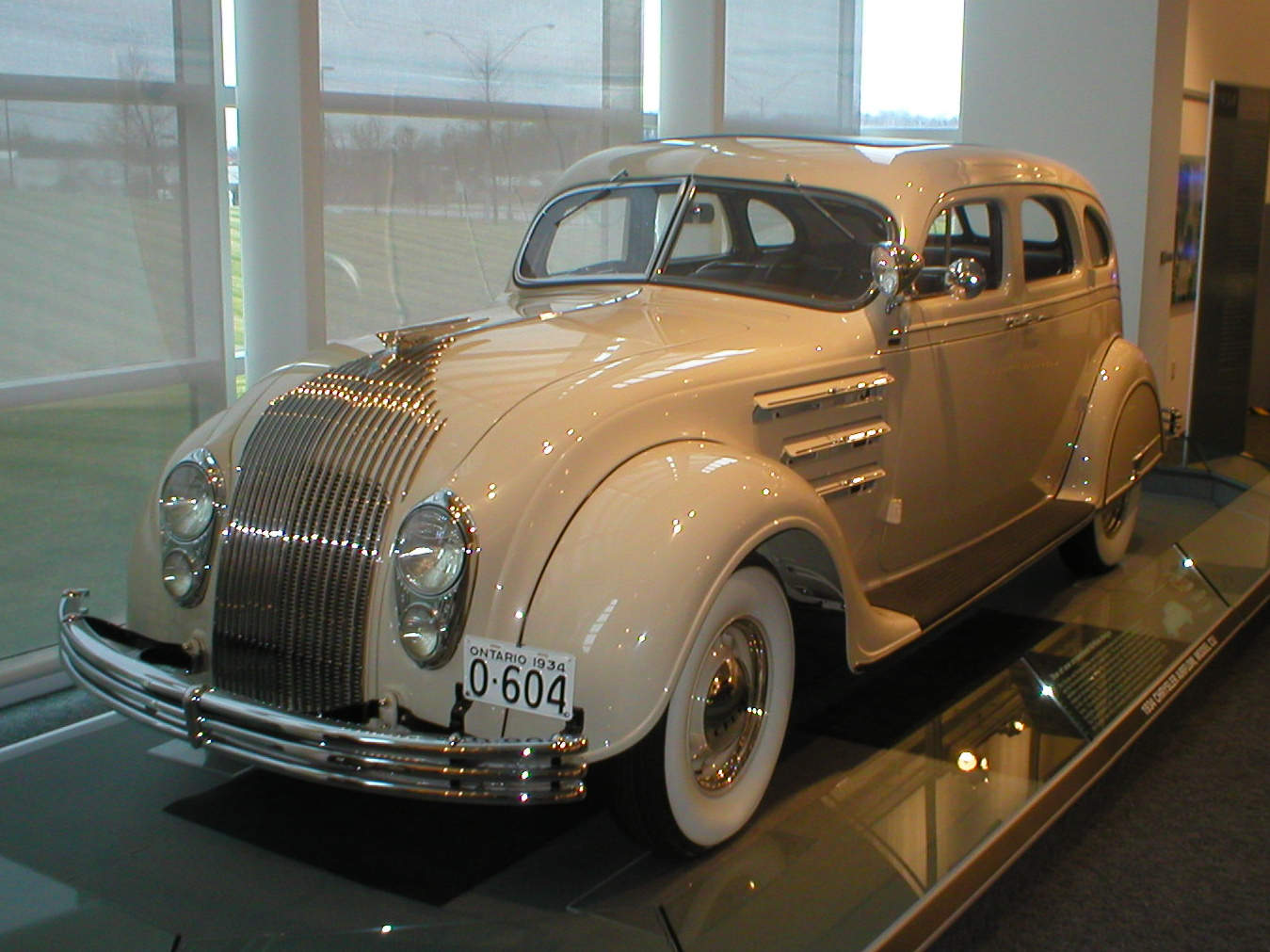
A fleet of vintage vehicles were used in the film's car dealership scenes, among them a Chrysler Airflow driven by Jack Kittredge (Chris O'Donnell).

Ideas of a possible feature film revolving around the character had been discussed by the company for several years, although American Girl president Ellen L. Brothers stated that "it was all brand new to us", and had to explore the feasibility of a live-action film by producing made-for-television adaptations of American Girl characters. After the successes of Samantha: An American Girl Holiday and succeeding TV movies, several options were considered on making the transition to a theatrical feature.

Production of the film, which involved finalizing the script and cast, film preparations and principal photography, took up roughly four months due to limitations on part of Abigail Breslin's availability before starting another production (Nim's Island). Camera angles were also put into consideration, with the film crew being careful not to shoot areas or objects on the set location that would be out of place in the 1930s setting. A multiple-camera setup was also used to speed up the process. Filming was done in and around Toronto, and in Tottenham, Ontario in the summer of 2007.

The costume department made use of vintage photographs by Dorothea Lange and old Sears-Roebuck catalogues for creating the cast's Depression-era clothing. As the Kittredge family would spend less on extra clothing, the costumes were distressed using sandpaper and trisodium phosphate, fading the colors of the clothes to give a more aged, worn out feel.

Among some of the vehicles used in the film, several 1934 Chrysler Airflows were used, one of which was driven by Kit's father. Besides the Airflow, a green 1933 Plymouth PC sedan and several 1933 Dodge DPs were also used. The car lot was portrayed as a Chrysler-Plymouth-Dodge dealership in Cincinnati in 1934. An antique 'Peter Whit' Toronto Transit Commission street car stood in for a City of Cincinnati one.

Coinciding with the film's release were video games based on the character, notably American Girl: Kit Mystery Challenge! for the Nintendo DS.

== Critical reception ==
The film received generally favorable reviews from critics. As of March 2020, review aggregator Rotten Tomatoes reported that 80% of critics gave the film positive reviews, based on 104 reviews, with the consensus "Refreshingly sweet and sincere, Kit's doll-and-book-inspired do-good mystery may be geared towards the tween girl but will please audiences of all ages." The site also awarded the film a Golden Tomato for Best Kids Film of 2008. Metacritic reported the film had an average score of 63 out of 100, based on 27 reviews.

Roger Ebert of the Chicago Sun-Times awarded the film 3 1/2 out of 4 stars and said it "has a great look, engaging performances, real substance and even a few whispers of political ideas." Writing in The New York Times, Jeannette Catsoulis said, "this classy, heart-on-its-sleeve movie is packed with laudable life lessons." Elizabeth Weitzman of the New York Daily News called it "resolutely old-fashioned" and thought "the script feels a little stiff and moralistic at times," but added, "it's hard to fault a film with such an intelligent, good-hearted heroine." Megan Basham of World Magazine said, "Even if young fans can't relate the struggles in the movie to their own life, Kit still offers more than the shows and movies typically aimed at the tween girl market. Besides the simple educational value of giving them a picture to connect with their history lessons, the film also focuses on more significant themes than the materialism and prettiness championed." In a three-star review, Bill Goodykoontz of The Herald Dispatch opined that while a film adaptation based on a doll line "smacks of rampant greed" as a "big-screen product placement designed to rope more girls into buying more product", he otherwise praised Kit Kittredge as a story about a determined young girl during the Great Depression which appeals to both children and their parents, though he otherwise noted the clunky resolution of the film's overarching mystery.

A less favorable review came from James Verniere of The Boston Herald, calling the film "one-dimensional" and saying, "I have no argument with the theme of empowerment aimed at an audience of girls. I do, however, take exception to a plot that is banal and predictable and performances that run the gamut from just OK to risible." Josh Larsen of the Illinois paper The Sun also gave Kit a negative review, bemoaning the film's plot as condescending towards its target audience, stating, "Kit Kittredge: An American Girl would be the perfect movie for history-minded 6- to 9-year-olds if it wasn't aimed at the intellectual level of a toddler."

== Home video release ==
Kit Kittredge: An American Girl was released on DVD and Blu-ray Disc on October 28, 2008, the only special feature being American Girl trailers.

The film was later released as part of a 4 disc set with 3 other American Girl films, including enhanced DVD-ROM features such as deleted scenes, an HBO look, a featurette on the casting, and a look at the 1930s.
