= Katie Henney =

American former actress

- Occupations: Television, film actress
- Website: Official website (archived)

Katie Henney is an American former child actress best known for her role as Elizabeth Cole in the 2005 movie, Felicity: An American Girl Adventure.

== Career ==
She has performed several roles in The American Girls Revue at American Girl Place New York. She also appeared in "Circle Of Friends" an American Girls Musical at the American Girl Place in New York. Her other theater credits include Sunshine, Ragamuffins, and Number the Stars.

Henney made small appearances on the TV shows The Naked Brothers Band, Blue Bloods, and Boardwalk Empire.

== Personal life ==
She lives in New York City with her parents, sister and brother. Katie attended The Independent Day School, a small, independent day school in Middlefield, Connecticut, and took up a musical theater course at Pace University.
