= American Girl (book series) =

Book series about a line of dolls

- Author: Various, including: Susan S. Adler; Dan Andreasen; Chryssa Atkinson; Emma Carlson Berne; Sarah Masters Buckey; Mary Casanova; Evelyn Coleman; Kathleen Ernst; Erin Falligant; Jacqueline Dembar Greene; Alison Hart; Elizabeth McDavid Jones; Amy Goldman Koss; Jane Kurtz; Kirby Larson; Megan McDonald; Denise Lewis Patrick; Connie Porter; Kathryn Reiss; Janet Beeler Shaw; Valerie Tripp; Lisa Yee; Laurence Yep
- Country: United States
- Language: English
- Genre: Historical fiction
- Publisher: American Girl
- Published: 1986 - current
- Media type: Print (Hardcover and Paperback)

The American Girl series, by various authors, is a collection of novels set within toy line's fictional universe. Since its inception, American Girl has published books based on the dolls, with novels and other media to tie in with their dolls. The books follow various American girls throughout both historical eras and contemporary settings.

The historical novels that have corresponding dolls are referred to as the Central Series. There is also the Girl of the Year line of characters from contemporary settings.

A related series entitled History Mysteries, also known as Mysteries Through Time and/or Mysteries through History, was released in 1999 and discontinued in 2004.

== Historical Characters and Beforever ==
The Historical Characters line featured dolls representing girls from various historical eras. Each doll had a series of six books that followed a standard structure, which were known as the Central Series. These books covered topics such as school, holidays, birthdays, and overcoming challenges. They also had a standard naming convention of Meet (Name), (Name) Learns a Lesson, (Name)'s Surprise, Happy Birthday, (Name)!, (Name) Saves the Day, and Changes for (Name). The series began to deviate from this rigid naming structure in 2002 with the introduction of the character of Kaya, whose lifestyle did not include birthdays or a formal winter holiday. Despite changing the naming structure, the series continued to have six books that covered about two years of the character's life. In 2014, American Girl rebranded the Historical Characters line into Beforever. With this rebranding came a modification of the series structure. The books were condensed into two volumes, which each covered three of the original books. New characters were released with two books in their series. In 2019 the line was changed back to the Historical Characters name. The books were republished without Beforever on the cover, but the two volume structure remained.

In addition to the Central Series, some characters received mysteries. These are set either during the central series or after the events of those books. They are longer than the original books, and often cover heavier or more nuanced topics. There are also short stories, which also take place during or after the main series but are much shorter, and often corresponded with outfits or accessories for the dolls. The characters available during the Beforever branding also received "My Journey" books which were "Choose-Your-Own-Adventure" (or gamebook style) stories where a modern girl went back in time to meet the main character. There are assorted other books related to the historical characters, including ones showing what happened between books, explaining historical context, or other stories, that vary based on character.

=== Central Series ===
Kirsten Larson (1854–1856)

1. Meet Kirsten: An American Girl. by Janet Beeler Shaw (1986)
2. Kirsten Learns a Lesson: A School Story. by Janet Beeler Shaw (1986)
3. Kirsten's Surprise: A Christmas Story. by Janet Beeler Shaw (1986)
4. Happy Birthday, Kirsten! A Springtime Story. by Janet Beeler Shaw (1987)
5. Kirsten Saves the Day: A Summer Story. by Janet Beeler Shaw (1988)
6. Changes for Kirsten: A Winter Story. by Janet Beeler Shaw (1988)

Samantha Parkington (1904–1906) The Samantha novels were first illustrated by Nancy Niles. Later editions were illustrated by Dan Andreasen.

1. Meet Samantha: An American Girl. by Susan S. Adler (1986)
2. Samantha Learns a Lesson: A School Story. by Susan S. Adler (1986)
3. Samantha's Surprise: A Christmas Story. by Maxine Rose Schur (1986)
4. Happy Birthday, Samantha! by Valerie Tripp (1987)
5. Samantha Saves the Day. by Valerie Tripp (1988)
6. Changes for Samantha. by Valerie Tripp (1988)

Molly McIntire (1944–1946)

1. Meet Molly by Valerie Tripp (1986)
2. Molly Learns a Lesson by Valerie Tripp (1986)
3. Molly's Surprise by Valerie Tripp (1986)
4. Happy Birthday, Molly! by Valerie Tripp (1987)
5. Molly Saves the Day by Valerie Tripp (1988)
6. Changes for Molly by Valerie Tripp (1988)

Felicity Merriman (1774–1776)

1. Meet Felicity by Valerie Tripp (1991)
2. Felicity Learns a Lesson by Valerie Tripp (1991)
3. Felicity's Surprise by Valerie Tripp (1991)
4. Happy Birthday, Felicity! by Valerie Tripp (1992)
5. Felicity Saves the Day by Valerie Tripp (1992)
6. Changes for Felicity by Valerie Tripp (1992)

Addy Walker (1864–1866)

1. Meet Addy by Connie Rose Porter (1993)
2. Addy Learns a Lesson by Connie Rose Porter (1993)
3. Addy's Surprise by Connie Rose Porter (1993)
4. Happy Birthday, Addy! by Connie Rose Porter (1994)
5. Addy Saves the Day by Connie Rose Porter (1994)
6. Changes for Addy by Connie Rose Porter (1994)

Josefina Montoya (1824–1826)

1. Meet Josefina by Valerie Tripp (1997)
2. Josefina Learns a Lesson by Valerie Tripp (1997)
3. Josefina's Surprise by Valerie Tripp (1997)
4. Happy Birthday, Josefina! by Valerie Tripp (1998)
5. Josefina Saves the Day by Valerie Tripp (1998)
6. Changes for Josefina by Valerie Tripp (1998)

Margaret Mildred "Kit" Kittredge (1932–1935)

1. Meet Kit by Valerie Tripp (2000)
2. Kit Learns a Lesson by Valerie Tripp (2000)
3. Kit's Surprise by Valerie Tripp (2000)
4. Happy Birthday, Kit! by Valerie Tripp (2001)
5. Kit Saves the Day by Valerie Tripp (2001)
6. Changes for Kit by Valerie Tripp (2001)

Kaya'aton'my (1764–1766)

1. Meet Kaya by Janet Beeler Shaw (2002)
2. Kaya's Escape! by Janet Beeler Shaw (2002)
3. Kaya's Hero by Janet Beeler Shaw (2002)
4. Kaya and Lone Dog by Janet Beeler Shaw (2002)
5. Kaya Shows the Way by Janet Beeler Shaw (2002)
6. Changes for Kaya by Janet Beeler Shaw (2002)

Julie Albright (1974–1977)

1. Meet Julie by Megan McDonald (2007)
2. Julie Tells Her Story by Megan McDonald (2007)
3. Happy New Year, Julie! by Megan McDonald (2007)
4. Julie and the Eagles by Megan McDonald (2007)
5. Julie's Journey by Megan McDonald (2007)
6. Changes for Julie by Megan McDonald (2007)

Rebecca Rubin (1914–1916)

1. Meet Rebecca by Jacqueline Dembar Greene (2009)
2. Rebecca and Ana by Jacqueline Dembar Greene (2009)
3. Candlelight for Rebecca by Jacqueline Dembar Greene (2009)
4. Rebecca and the Movies by Jacqueline Dembar Greene (2009)
5. Rebecca to the Rescue by Jacqueline Dembar Greene (2009)
6. Changes for Rebecca by Jacqueline Dembar Greene (2009)

Cécile Rey & Marie-Grace Gardner (1853–1854)

1. Meet Marie-Grace by Sarah Masters Buckey (2011)
2. Meet Cécile by Denise Lewis Patrick (2011)
3. Marie-Grace and the Orphans by Sarah Masters Buckey (2011)
4. Troubles for Cécile by Denise Lewis Patrick (2011)
5. Marie-Grace Makes a Difference by Sarah Masters Buckey (2011)
6. Cécile's Gift by Denise Lewis Patrick (2011)

Caroline Abbott (1812–1813)

1. Meet Caroline by Kathleen Ernst (2012)
2. Caroline's Secret Message by Kathleen Ernst (2012)
3. A Surprise for Caroline by Kathleen Ernst (2012)
4. Caroline Takes a Chance by Kathleen Ernst (2012)
5. Caroline's Battle by Kathleen Ernst (2012)
6. Changes for Caroline by Kathleen Ernst (2012)

=== Best Friend Books ===
- Nellie's Promise by Valerie Tripp (2004)
- Very Funny, Elizabeth by Valerie Tripp (2005)
- Brave Emily by Valerie Tripp (2006)
- Really Truly Ruthie by Valerie Tripp (2008)
- Good Luck, Ivy by Lisa Yee (2008)

=== Beforever and Post-Beforever ===
Samantha Parkington (1904–1906)

- Manners and Mischief: A Samantha Classic Volume 1 by Susan S. Adler (2014)
- Lost and Found: A Samantha Classic Volume 2 by Valerie Tripp (2014)
- The Lilac Tunnel: My Journey with Samantha by Erin Falligant (2014)

Molly McIntire (1944–1946)

- A Winning Spirit by Valerie Tripp (2018)
- Stars, Stripes and Surprises by Valerie Tripp (2018)
- Chances and Changes: My Journey with Molly by Valerie Tripp (2018)

Felicity Merriman (1774–1776)

- Love and Loyalty: A Felicity Classic 1 by Valerie Tripp (2017)
- A Stand for Independence: A Felicity Classic 2 by Valerie Tripp (2017)
- Gunpowder and Tea Cakes: My Journey with Felicity by Kathleen Ernst (2017)

Addy Walker (1864–1866)

- Finding Freedom: An Addy Classic Volume 1 by Connie Rose Porter (2014)
- A Heart Full of Hope: An Addy Classic Volume 2 by Connie Rose Porter (2014)
- A New Beginning: My Journey with Addy by Denise Lewis Patrick (2014)

Josefina Montoya (1824–1826)

- Sunlight and Shadows: A Josefina Classic Volume 1 by Valerie Tripp (2014)
- Second Chances: A Josefina Classic Volume 2 by Valerie Tripp (2014)
- Song of the Mockingbird: My Journey with Josefina by Emma Carlson Berne (2015)

Kit Kittredge (1932–1935)

- Read All about It: A Kit Classic Volume 1 by Valerie Tripp (2014)
- Turning Things Around: A Kit Classic Volume 2 by Valerie Tripp (2014)
- Full Speed Ahead: My Journey with Kit by Valerie Tripp (2014)

Kaya'aton'my (1764–1766)

- The Journey Begins: A Kaya Classic Volume 1 by Janet Beeler Shaw (2014)
- Smoke on the Wind: A Kaya Classic Volume 2 by Janet Beeler Shaw (2014)
- The Roar of the Falls: My Journey with Kaya by Emma Carlson Berne (2014)

Julie Albright (1974–1977)

- The Big Break: A Julie Classic Volume 1 by Megan McDonald (2014)
- Soaring High: A Julie Classic Volume 2 by Megan McDonald (2014)
- A Brighter Tomorrow: My Journey with Julie by Megan McDonald (2014)

Rebecca Rubin (1914–1916)

- The Sound of Applause: A Rebecca Classic Volume 1 by Jacqueline Dembar Greene (2014)
- Lights, Camera, Rebecca!: A Rebecca Classic Volume 2 by Jacqueline Dembar Greene (2014)
- The Glow of the Spotlight: My Journey with Rebecca by Jacqueline Dembar Greene (2014)

Caroline Abbott (1812–1813)

- Captain of the Ship: A Caroline Classic Volume 1 by Kathleen Ernst (2014)
- Facing the Enemy: A Caroline Classic Volume 2 by Kathleen Ernst (2014)
- Catch the Wind: My Journey with Caroline by Kathleen Ernst (2014)

Maryellen Larkin (1954–1956)

- The One and Only: A Maryellen Classic by Valerie Tripp (2015)
- Taking Off: A Maryellen Classic 2 by Valerie Tripp (2015)
- The Sky's the Limit: My Journey with Maryellen by Valerie Tripp (2015)

Melody Ellison (1963–1964)

- No Ordinary Sound: A Melody Classic by Denise Lewis Patrick (2016)
- Never Stop Singing: A Melody Classic Volume 2 by Denise Lewis Patrick (2016)
- Music In My Heart: My Journey with Melody by Erin Falligant (2016)

Nanea Mitchell (1941–1942)

- Growing Up with Aloha: A Nanea Classic Volume 1 by Kirby Larson (2017)
- Hula for the Home Front: A Nanea Classic Volume 2 by Kirby Larson (2017)
- Prints in the Sand: My Journey with Nanea by Erin Falligant (2017)

Courtney Moore (1986–1987)

- Courtney Changes the Game by Kellen Hertz (2020)
- Courtney: Friendship Superhero by Kellen Hertz (2021)

Claudie Wells (1922)

- Meet Claudie: An American Girl by Brit Bennett (2022)
- Adventures with Claudie: An American Girl by Brit Bennett (2023)

Isabel and Nicki Hoffman (1999)

- Meet Isabel and Nicki by Julia DeVillers and Jennifer Roy (2023)

=== Historical Character Mysteries ===
Kirsten Larson (1854–1856)

- The Runaway Friend by Kathleen Ernst (2008)

Samantha Parkington (1904–1906)

- The Curse of Ravenscourt: A Samantha Mystery by Sarah Masters Buckey (2005)
- The Stolen Sapphire: A Samantha Mystery by Sarah Masters Buckey (2006)
- The Cry of the Loon: A Samantha Mystery by Barbara Steiner (2009)
- Clue in the Castle Tower: A Samantha Mystery by Sarah Masters Buckey (2011)
- Danger in Paris: A Samantha Mystery by Sarah Masters Buckey (2015)

Molly McIntire (1944–1946)

- A Spy on the Home Front: A Molly Mystery by Alison Hart (2005)
- The Light in the Cellar: A Molly Mystery by Sarah Masters Buckey (2007)
- Clues in the Shadows: A Molly Mystery by Kathleen Ernst (2009)

Felicity Merriman (1774–1776)

- Peril at King's Creek: A Felicity Mystery by Elizabeth McDavid Jones (2006)
- Traitor in Williamsburg: A Felicity Mystery by Elizabeth McDavid Jones (2008)
- Lady Margaret's Ghost: A Felicity Mystery by Elizabeth McDavid Jones (2009)

Addy Walker (1864–1866)

- Shadows on Society Hill: An Addy Mystery by Evelyn Coleman (2007)

Josefina Montoya (1824–1826)

- Secrets in the Hills: A Josefina Mystery by Kathleen Ernst (2006)
- The Glowing Heart: A Josefina Mystery by Valerie Tripp (2016)

Kit Kittredge (1932–1935)

- Danger at the Zoo: A Kit Mystery by Kathleen Ernst (2005)
- Midnight in Lonesome Hollow: A Kit Mystery by Kathleen Ernst (2007)
- A Thief in the Theater: A Kit Mystery by Sarah Masters Buckey (2008)
- Missing Grace: A Kit Mystery by Elizabeth McDavid Jones (2010)
- Intruders at Rivermead Manor: A Kit Mystery by Kathryn Reiss (2014)
- The Jazzman's Trumpet: A Kit Mystery by Elizabeth Cody Kimmel (2015)
- Menace at Mammoth Cave: A Kit Mystery by Mary Casanova (2018)

Kaya'aton'my (1764–1766)

- The Silent Stranger: A Kaya Mystery by Janet Beeler Shaw (2005)
- The Ghost Wind Stallion: A Kaya Mystery by Emma Carlson Berne (2016)

Julie Albright (1974–1977)

- The Tangled Web: A Julie Mystery by Kathryn Reiss (2009)
- The Puzzle of the Paper Daughter: A Julie Mystery by Kathryn Reiss (2010)
- The Silver Guitar: A Julie Mystery by Kathryn Reiss (2011)
- Lost in the City: A Julie Mystery by Kathleen O'Dell (2013)
- Message in a Bottle: A Julie Mystery by Kathryn Reiss (2017)

Rebecca Rubin (1914–1916)

- Secrets at Camp Nokomis: A Rebecca Mystery by Jacqueline Dembar Greene (2010)
- A Bundle of Trouble: A Rebecca Mystery by Kathryn Reiss (2011)
- The Crystal Ball: A Rebecca Mystery by Jacqueline Dembar Greene (2012)
- A Growing Suspicion: A Rebecca Mystery by Jacqueline Dembar Greene (2014)
- The Showstopper: A Rebecca Mystery by Mary Casanova (2018)

Cécile Rey & Marie-Grace Gardner (1853–1854)

- The Hidden Gold: A Marie-Grace Mystery by Sarah Masters Buckey (2012)
- The Cameo Necklace: A Cecile Mystery by Evelyn Coleman (2012)
- The Haunted Opera: A Marie-Grace Mystery by Sarah Masters Buckey (2013)

Caroline Abbott (1812–1813)

- Traitor in the Shipyard: A Caroline Mystery by Kathleen Ernst (2013)
- The Traveler's Tricks: A Caroline Mystery by Laurie Calkhoven (2014)
- The Smuggler's Secrets: A Caroline Mystery by Kathleen Ernst (2015)

Maryellen Larkin (1954–1956)

- The Finders-Keepers Rule: A Maryellen Mystery by Jacqueline Dembar Greene (2016)
- The Runaway: A Maryellen Mystery by Alison Hart (2017)

Melody Ellison (1963–1964)

- The Lady's Slipper: A Melody Mystery by Emma Carlson Berne (2017)

Nanea Mitchell (1941–1942)

- The Legend of the Shark Goddess: A Nanea Mystery by Erin Falligant (2018)

=== Short stories ===
Kirsten Larson (1854–1856)

- Kirsten on the Trail by Janet Beeler Shaw (1999)
- Kirsten and the New Girl by Janet Beeler Shaw (2000)
- Kirsten Snowbound! by Janet Beeler Shaw (2001)
- Kirsten and the Chippewa by Janet Beeler Shaw (2002)
- Kirsten's Promise by Janet Beeler Shaw (2003)
- Kirsten's Short Story Collection by Janet Beeler Shaw (2006)

Samantha Parkington (1904–1906)

- Samantha's Winter Party by Valerie Tripp (1999)
- Samantha Saves the Wedding by Valerie Tripp (2000)
- Samantha and the Missing Pearls by Valerie Tripp (2001)
- Samantha's Blue Bicycle by Valerie Tripp (2002)
- Samantha's Short Story Collection by Valerie Tripp (2002)
- Samantha's Special Talent by Sarah Masters Buckey (2003)

Molly McIntire (1944–1946)

- Molly Takes Flight by Valerie Tripp (1999)
- Molly and the Movie Star by Valerie Tripp (2000)
- Molly Marches On by Valerie Tripp (2001)
- Molly's A+ Partner by Valerie Tripp (2002)
- Molly's Puppy Tale by Valerie Tripp (2003)
- Molly's Short Story Collection by Valerie Tripp (2006)

Felicity Merriman (1774–1776)

- Felicity's New Sister by Valerie Tripp (1999)
- Felicity's Dancing Shoes by Valerie Tripp (2000)
- Felicity Takes a Dare by Valerie Tripp (2001)
- Felicity Discovers a Secret by Valerie Tripp (2002)
- Felicity's Short Story Collection by Valerie Tripp (2002)

Addy Walker (1864–1866)

- High Hopes for Addy by Connie Rose Porter (1999)
- Addy's Little Brother by Connie Rose Porter (2000)
- Addy's Wedding Quilt by Connie Rose Porter (2001)
- Addy Studies Freedom by Connie Rose Porter (2002)
- Addy's Summer Place by Connie Rose Porter (2003)
- Addy's Short Story Collection by Connie Rose Porter (2002)

Josefina Montoya (1824–1826)

- A Reward for Josefina by Valerie Tripp (1999)
- Again, Josefina! by Valerie Tripp (2000)
- Josefina's Song by Valerie Tripp (2001)
- Just Josefina by Valerie Tripp (2002)
- Thanks to Josefina by Valerie Tripp (2003)
- Josefina's Short Story Collection by Valerie Tripp (2006)

Kit Kittredge (1932–1935)

- Kit's Home Run by Valerie Tripp (2002)
- Kit's Tree House by Valerie Tripp (2003)
- Kit's Short Story Collection by Valerie Tripp (2006)

Kaya'aton'my (1764–1766)

- Kaya and the River Girl by Janet Beeler Shaw (2003)
- Kaya's Short Story Collection by Janet Beeler Shaw (2006)

=== Miscellaneous Historical Books ===
Kirsten Larson (1854–1856)

- Kirsten's Cookbook by Valerie Tripp (1994)
- Kirsten's Craft Book by Jodi Evert (1994)
- Kirsten's Theater Kit by American Girl (1994)
- Welcome To Kirsten's World · 1854: Growing Up in Pioneer America (1999)

Samantha Parkington (1904–1906)

- Samantha's Cook Book by Jodi Evert (1994)
- Samantha's Craft Book by Jodi Evert (1994)
- Samantha's Theater Kit by American Girl (1994)
- Welcome to Samantha's World · 1904: Growing Up in America's New Century by Catherine Gourley (1999)
- Samantha's Friendship Fun (2002)
- Samantha's Ocean Liner Adventure by Dottie Raymer (2002)
- Samantha's Christmas Crafts by American Girl (2003)
- Samantha's Valentine Crafts
- Samantha's Wedding Memories: A Scrapbook of Gard and Cornelia's Wedding by Dan Andreasen (2004)
- Samantha: An American Girl Holiday: The Complete Telescript of Samantha's Movie (2004)
- Lights! Camera! Samantha!: A Behind-the Scenes Movie Guide to Samantha: An American Girl Holiday by Tamara England (2004)
- Samantha's Art Studio
- Samantha's Cooking Studio (2007)
- Samantha's Fashion Studio (2008)
- Samantha's World: A Girl's-Eye View of the Turn of the 20th Century (2009)
- Samantha's Just For Fun (2010)
- Samantha Treasure Tote (2012)
- Real Stories From My Time: The Titanic by Emma Carlson Berne (2017)
- Samantha Helps a Friend by Rebecca Mallary (2021)
- Samantha: The Next Chapter by Fiona Davis (2026)

Molly McIntire (1944–1946)

- Molly's Cookbook: A Peek at Dining in the Past With Meals You Can Cook Today by Polly Athan (1994)
- Molly's Craft Book by Jodi Evert (1994)
- Molly's Theater Kit by Valerie Tripp (1994)
- Welcome to Molly's World · 1944: Growing Up in World War Two America by Catherine Gourley (1999)
- Molly's Route 66 Adventure by Dottie Raymer (2002)
- Have a Molly Halloween (2004)
- Lights! Camera! Molly!: A Behind-The-Scenes Movie Guide (2006)
- Molly's Cooking Studio (2007)
- Molly's Fashion Studio (2008)
- Molly Fashion Design Portfolio
- Molly's Art Studio
- Molly's Just For Fun (2009)
- Molly Treasure Tote (2012)
- Molly's Christmas Surprise by Lauren Clauss (2021)
- Molly's Variety Show Event Kit

Felicity Merriman (1774–1776)

- Introduction to Williamsburg by Paul Lackner (1985)
- Felicity's Cookbook by Polly Athan (1994)
- Felicity's Craft Book by Jodi Evert (1994)
- Felicity's Theater Kit (1994)
- Welcome To Felicity's World · 1774: Growing Up in Colonial America (1999)
- Lights! Camera! Felicity! (2005)
- Felicity's Cooking Studio (2007)
- Felicity's Fashion Studio (2008)
- Felicity's Art Studio
- Felicity's Just For Fun (2009)
- Felicity Treasure Tote (2012)
- Real Stories From My Time: The Boston Tea Party by Rebecca Paley (2018)

Addy Walker (1864–1866)

- Addy's Cook Book by Jodi Evert (1994)
- Addy's Craft Book by Connie Rose Porter (1994)
- Addy's Theater Kit (1994)
- Welcome To Addy's World · 1864: Growing Up During America's Civil War (1999)
- Real Stories From My Time: The Underground Railroad by Bonnie Bader (2017)
- Freedom for Addy by Tonya Leslie (2021)

Josefina Montoya (1824–1826)

- Josefina's Fiesta Event Kit
- Josefina's Craft Book (1998)
- Josefina's Cookbook (1998)
- Josefina's Theater Kit (1998)
- Welcome To Josefina's World 1824: Growing Up on America's Southwest Frontier (1999)
- Josefina's Just For Fun (2009)
- Josefina Treasure Tote (2011)

Kit Kittredge (1932–1935)

- Welcome to Kit's World · 1934: Growing Up During America's Great Depression by Harriet Brown (2002)
- Kit's Friendship Fun (2002)
- Kit's Railway Adventure by Harriet Brown (2003)
- Kit's World: A Girl's Eyes View of the Great Depression (2008)
- Kit's Cooking Studio (2008)
- Kit's Fashion Studio (2008)
- Kit Fashion Portfolio Design
- Kit's Art Studio
- Kit's Just For Fun (2009)
- Kit Treasure Tote (2011)
- Kit's Color and Craft (2013)

Kaya'aton'my (1764–1766)

- Kaya's Art Studio
- Welcome To Kaya's World, 1764: Growing Up in a Native American Homeland (2003)
- Kaya Rides to the Rescue by Emma Carlson Berne (2022)

Julie Albright (1974–1977)

- Julie's Cooking Studio (2008)
- Julie's Art Studio
- Julie's Fashion Studio (2008)
- Julie Fashion Design Portfolio
- Julie's Just For Fun (2009)
- Julie Treasure Tote (2011)
- Julie's Color and Craft (2013)
- Julie: My Journal by Megan McDonald (2024)

Rebecca Rubin (1914–1916)

- Rebecca's Fashion Studio (2008)
- Rebecca's Just For Fun (2009)
- Rebecca Fashion Design Portfolio
- Rebecca Treasure Tote (2011)
- Rebecca's Color and Craft (2013)

Cécile Rey & Marie-Grace Gardner (1853–1854)

- Cécile and Marie-Grace's Just For Fun (2011)
- Marie-Grace's Treasure Tote (2013)
- Cécile's Treasure Tote (2013)

Caroline Abbott (1812–1813)

- Caroline's Color and Craft (2013)

Melody Ellison (1963–1964)

- Real Stories From My Time: The March on Washington by Bonnie Bader (2018)
- Melody Lifts Her Voice by Bria Alston (2022)
- Melody: My Diary by Denise Lewis Patrick (2025)

Nanea Mitchell (1941–1942)

- Real Stories From My Time: Pearl Harbor by Jennifer Swanson (2018)

Courtney Moore (1986–1987)

- The Diary of Courtney Moore by Kellen Hertz (2026)

Isabel and Nicki Hoffman (1999)

- Isabel: My Journal by Julia DeVillers (2023)
- Nicki: My Journal by Jennifer Roy (2023)

=== Multiple Characters ===
There are some books that incorporate stories and characters from multiple of the Historical Characters series.

- The American Girls Holiday Treasury (2005)
- American Girl: Inspiring Stories From the Past: Coloring and Activity Book (2020)
- American Girl Coloring Journal: Playful Patterns & Mindful Activities Inspired by Your Favorite American Girl Characters (2021)

==== Little Golden Books ====
Beginning in 2021, to celebrate their 35th anniversary, American Girl released several Little Golden Books which retold stories from the Historical Character's books for a younger audience. The books combined stories from different series under a common theme, such as birthdays or holidays.

- Happy Birthday! (American Girl) by Rebecca Mallary (2021)
- Happy Holidays! (American Girl) by Lauren Diaz Morgan (2021)
- Making a Difference (American Girl) by Rebecca Mallary (2022)
- Time for School! (American Girl) by Lauren Diaz Morgan (2022)
- Grandmas Are the Best! (American Girl) by Rebecca Mallary (2023)

== Girl of the Year ==
Lindsey Bergman (2001)

- Lindsey by Chryssa Atkinson (2001)

Kailey Hopkins (2003)

- Kailey by Amy Goldman Koss (2003)

Marisol Luna (2005)

- Marisol by Gary Soto (2005)

Jess McConnell (2006)

- Jess by Mary Casanova (2005)

Nicki Fleming (2007)

- Nicki by Ann Howard Creel (2006)
- Thanks to Nicki by Ann Howard Creel (2007)

Mia St. Clair (2008)

- Mia by Laurence Yep (2008)
- Bravo, Mia! by Laurence Yep (2008)

Chrissa Maxwell (2009)

- Chrissa by Mary Casanova (2008)
- Chrissa Stands Strong by Mary Casanova (2008)

Lanie Holland (2010)

- Lanie by Jane Kurtz (2010)
- Lanie's Real Adventures by Jane Kurtz (2010)

Kanani Akina (2011)

- Aloha, Kanani by Lisa Yee (2011)
- Good Job, Kanani by Lisa Yee (2011)

McKenna Brooks (2012)

- McKenna by Mary Casanova (2011)
- McKenna, Ready to Fly! by Mary Casanova (2011)

Saige Copeland (2013)

- Saige by Jessie Haas (2012)
- Saige Paints the Sky by Jessie Haas (2012)

Isabelle Palmer (2014)

- Isabelle by Laurence Yep (2014)
- Designs By Isabelle by Laurence Yep (2014)
- To the Stars, Isabelle by Laurence Yep (2014)

Grace Thomas (2015)

- Grace by Mary Casanova (2015)
- Grace Stirs it Up by Mary Casanova (2015)
- Grace Makes It Great by Mary Casanova (2015)

Lea Clark (2016)

- Lea Dives In by Lisa Yee (2016)
- Lea Leads the Way by Lisa Yee (2016)
- Lea and Camila by Lisa Yee (2016)

Gabriela McBride (2017)

- Gabriela by Teresa E. Harris (2016)
- Gabriela Speaks Out by Teresa E. Harris (2017)
- Gabriela: Time for Change by Varian Johnson (2017)

Luciana Vega (2018)

- Luciana by Erin Teagan (2017)
- Luciana: Braving the Deep by Erin Teagan (2017)
- Luciana: Out of This World by Erin Teagan (2018)

Blaire Wilson (2019)

- Blaire by Jennifer Castle (2018)
- Blaire Cooks Up a Plan by Jennifer Castle (2018)

Joss Kendrick (2020)

- Joss by Erin Falligant (2019)
- Joss: Touch the Sky by Erin Falligant (2019)

Kira Bailey (2021)

- Kira Down Under by Erin Teagan (2021)
- Kira's Animal Rescue by Erin Teagan (2021)

Corinne Tan (2022)

- Corinne by Wendy Wan-Long Shang (2021)
- Corinne to the Rescue by Wendy Wan-Long Shang (2021)

Kavi Sharma (2023)

- Kavi's Journal by Varsha Bajaj (2023)
- It's Showtime, Kavi by Varsha Bajaj (2023)

Lila Monetti (2024)

- Lila's Journal by Erin Filligant (2023)
- Lila Goes for Gold by Erin Filligant (2024)

Summer McKinny (2025)

- Summer's Journal by Clare Hutton (2024)
- Summer Gets to Work by Clare Hutton (2025)

Raquel Reyes (2026)

- Raquel's Journal by Angela Cervantes (2025)
- Raquel Reyes Saves the Wedding by Angela Cervantes (2025)

== Contemporary Characters ==
Tenney Grant

1. Tenney by Kellen Hertz (2017)
2. Tenney in the Key of Friendship by Kellen Hertz (2017)
3. Tenney Shares the Stage by Kellen Hertz (2017)
4. A Song for the Season by Kellen Hertz (2017)

Z Yang

1. The Real Z by Jen Calonita (2017)
2. Z On Location by J.J. Howard (2017)

== World by Us ==
- Makena: See Me, Hear Me, Know Me by Denise Lewis Patrick
- Evette: The River and Me by Sharon Dennis Wyeth
- Maritza: Lead with Your Heart by Angela Cervantes

== History Mysteries ==
The series comprises a total of 22 books by various authors and forms a companion series to the popular American Girl books; unlike Girl of the Year and other lines, they do not come with any doll or toy and acts as a stand-alone novel set in a particular period in American history. The characters were generally older, ranging from ages ten to fourteen, and the books were marketed as for ages ten and up. Many of the authors from this series later moved on to write for the Central Series. Several books from the series were later re-released in digital form by Open Road Integrated Media.

Titles in order of publication:

1. The Smuggler's Treasure by Sarah Masters Buckey (1812, New Orleans) (1999)
2. Hoofbeats of Danger by Holly Hughes (1860, Nebraska Territory) (1999)
3. The Night Flyers by Elizabeth McDavid Jones (1918, North Carolina) (1999)
4. Voices at Whisper Bend by Katherine Ayres (1942, Pennsylvania) (1999)
5. Secrets on 26th Street by Elizabeth McDavid Jones (1912, Chelsea) (1999)
6. Mystery of the Dark Tower by Evelyn Coleman (1928, Harlem) (2000)
7. Trouble at Fort La Pointe by Kathleen Ernst (1732, Lake Superior) (1999)
8. Under Copp's Hill by Katherine Ayres (1908, Boston) (2000)
9. Watcher in the Piney Woods by Elizabeth McDavid Jones (1865, Virginia) (2000)
10. Shadows in the Glasshouse by Megan McDonald (1621, Jamestown) (2000)
11. The Minstrel's Melody by Eleanora E. Tate (1904, Calico Creek and St. Louis) (2001)
12. Riddle of the Prairie Bride by Kathryn Reiss (1878, Kansas) (2001)
13. Enemy in the Fort by Sarah Masters Buckey (1754, New Hampshire) (2001)
14. Circle of Fire by Evelyn Coleman (1958, Middle Tennessee) (2001)
15. Mystery on Skull Island by Elizabeth McDavid Jones (1724, Charles Town, South Carolina) (2001)
16. Whistler in the Dark by Kathleen Ernst (1867, Chicago and the Colorado Territory) (2002)
17. Mystery at Chilkoot Pass by Barbara Steiner (1897, Yukon, Alaska) (2002)
18. The Strange Case of Baby H by Kathryn Reiss (1906, San Francisco) (2002)
19. Danger at the Wild West Show by Alison Hart (1886, Louisville, Kentucky) (2003)
20. Gangsters at the Grand Atlantic by Sarah Masters Buckey (1925, New Jersey) (2003)
21. Ghost Light on Graveyard Shoal by Elizabeth McDavid Jones (1895, Glenn Island, Virginia) (2003)
22. Betrayal at Cross Creek by Kathleen Ernst (1775–1776, North Carolina) (2004)

== Girls of Many Lands ==
Girls of Many Lands was a collection of dolls and books focusing on girls from different historical periods and countries around the world. The line was aimed towards an older demographic than the Historical Characters line, as they were smaller more delicate dolls, and longer books with more complex themes. The line had eight characters total, and was available from 2002 to 2005.

- Isabel: Taking Wing by Annie Dalton (1592, England) (2002)
- Cécile: Gates of Gold by Mary Casanova (1711, France) (2002)
- Leyla: The Black Tulip by Alev Lytle Croutier (1720, Turkey) (2003)
- Saba: Under the Hyena's Foot by Jane Kurtz (1846, Ethiopia) (2003)
- Spring Pearl: The Last Flower by Laurence Yep (1857, China) (2002)
- Minuk: Ashes in the Pathway by Kirkpatrick Hill (1890, Alaska) (2002)
- Kathleen: The Celtic Knot by Siobhán Parkinson (1937, Ireland) (2003)
- Neela: Victory Song by Chitra Banerjee Divakaruni (1939, India) (2002)

== Wellie Wishers ==
The Wellie Wishers line of dolls was introduced in 2016 to appeal to a younger demographic. Books can be purchased with the dolls, or separately. The books focus on the main characters playing in their backyard and visiting fantasy worlds.

Titles in order of publication:

1. Ashlyn's Unsurprise Party by Valerie Tripp (2016)
2. The Muddily-Puddily Show by Valerie Tripp (2016)
3. The Riddle of the Robin by Valerie Tripp (2016)
4. Camille's Mermaid Tale by Valerie Tripp (2017)
5. The Rainstorm Brainstorm by Valerie Tripp (2017)
6. The Mystery of Mr. E by Valerie Tripp (2017)
7. Willa's Wilderness Campout by Valerie Tripp (2018)
8. Emerson and Princess Peep by Valerie Tripp (2018)
9. The Clippity-Cloppity Carnival by Valerie Tripp (2018)
10. The Princesses and the Dragon by Valerie Tripp (2022)
11. Teamwork Magic by Valerie Tripp (2022)
12. A Fin-tastic Surprise by Valerie Tripp (2023)
13. Ready to be Royal by Valerie Tripp (2023)

There is a line of Scholastic Reader books that retell episodes of the animated series, or contain information about the show. These include:

1. Ashlyn's Fall Fiesta by Meredith Rusu (2018)
2. Emerson Is Mighty Girl! by Meredith Rusu (2018)
3. Kendall's Snow Fort by Meredith Rusu (2018)
4. Meet the WellieWishers by Judy Katschke (2018)
5. Sunny Day Scavenger Hunt by Meredith Rusu (2018)
6. Willa's Butterfly Ballet by Judy Katschke (2018)
7. Pony Surprise by Meredith Rusu (2019)
