= Samantha: An American Girl Holiday =

2004 television film

- Also known as: An American Girl Holiday
- Based on: The Samantha stories from The American Girls Collection by: Valerie Tripp; Susan S. Adler; Maxine Rose Schur
- Teleplay by: Marsha Norman
- Directed by: Nadia Tass
- Starring: AnnaSophia Robb; Mia Farrow; Kelsey Lewis; Jordan Bridges; Rebecca Mader
- Music by: Chris Hajian

Production
- Running time: 86 minutes

Original release
- Network: The WB
- Release: November 23, 2004

Related
- Felicity: An American Girl Adventure

Samantha: An American Girl Holiday is a 2004 television film, based on the American Girl children's books written by Susan S. Adler and Valerie Tripp. The film premiered on The WB on November 23, 2004. The film follows young, wealthy Samantha Parkington's adventures with three poor orphan girls. Shot in Toronto, Ontario, Canada, the 86-minute film features lavish period costumes and settings, and was nominated for three Young Artist Awards, winning one.

Samantha is the first film in the American Girl franchise.

== Plot ==
In 1904, Samantha Parkington lives in a large country house in the fictional town of Mount Bedford, New York with her grandmother. In April, Nellie O'Malley and her sisters Bridget and Jenny along with their Irish immigrant father arrive in Mount Bedford to work as servants at Samantha's neighbour, Eddie Ryland's house. After defending them from Eddie's bullying, Samantha befriends Nellie and her sisters.

After becoming closer, Nellie opens up about her mother's death and has come from New York City after working in a factory with other immigrant children. Samantha offers to teach Nellie after learning of her illiteracy, and she also shares with Nellie about her parents' deaths in a boat accident.

Samantha's Uncle Gardner arrives at Mount Bedford with his fiancée Cornelia Pitt who Samantha at first dislikes because she doesn't want anything else to change. Cornelia and Grandmary clash at dinner as Cornelia is a suffragette but Grandmary doesn't think women need to vote. Gardner reveals his surprise to Samantha, him and Cornelia are getting married in Mount Bedford at the end of July. Samantha hesitantly accepts Cornelia's request to be her bridesmaid at the wedding and expresses her feelings to Gardner after he forgets he was meant to take her to the St. Louis exposition in July and is worried he will forget about her after he marries but he assures her she'll always be part of his family.

One night, Samantha overhears Gardner talking to Grandmary about Samantha going to stay in New York City for the fall with him and Cornelia to make it up for missing their trip to St. Louis. Upset, Samantha and Nellie hide in the boathouse overnight which Samantha has made her hiding place. Eddie catches them the next morning and snitches on them; Samantha takes the blame but both of them are forgiven.

Samantha moves to New York City and regularly writes Nellie letters and sending her slides of the city for a stereopticon, a present from Uncle Gard which Samantha gave to Nellie. At her new school, Samantha and the other girls are instructed to write a speech about "Progress in America" for a contest to perform at a Christmas program in front of the entire school where Samantha chooses to write about factories.

A letter arrives from Grandmary's maid saying that Nellie's father has died from influenza and that the girls have been sent to an orphanage in New York City. Samantha and Cornelia are able to visit the orphanage due to Cornelia's friend's donations. They find that the orphanage is run poorly by a thieving matron and that Nellie has been separated from her sisters. Samantha helps the three girls escape and hides them in Gardner and Cornelia's attic while Nellie goes back to work at a factory.

One morning, Bridget wakes up with a fever so Samantha goes to the factory to find Nellie. There, she witnesses the perils of child labor. Despite risking losing her job, Nellie leaves to care for Bridget. Samantha confesses to her aunt and uncle about her hiding the girls in the attic. They allow the girls to stay for the meantime while Bridget recovers but Gard says he must call the authorities. Moved by the abuses she witnessed, Samantha rewrites her speech which she performed at the Christmas program, arguing how America cannot achieve progress or be proud of their factories until conditions improve.

In the winter, near the end of Samantha's original stay, Cornelia and Gard ask her if she wants to stay with them in New York City permanently after Grandmary has finally accepted Admiral Bemmis's proposal which Samantha accepts. Samantha also asks if Nellie, Bridget and Jenny can stay with them to work as maids and they reveal on Christmas morning they will not only be staying, they will also be adopted along with Samantha. They all accept with Jenny saying her first words since the passing of her mother. The films ends with Samantha gifting presents to the girls living in the orphanage under a new owner.

== Cast ==
- AnnaSophia Robb as Samantha Parkington
- Kelsey Lewis as Nellie O'Malley
- Mia Farrow as Mary Edwards
- Jordan Bridges as Gardner Edwards
- Rebecca Mader as Cornelia Edwards
- Olivia Ballantyne as Jenny O'Malley
- Hannah Endicott-Douglas as Bridget O'Malley
- Michael Kanev as Eddie Ryland
- Karen Eyo as School Principal
- Keir Gilchrist as Factory Boy
- Shary Guthrie as Teacher
- Jackie Brown as Factory Lady
- Shae Norris as Agatha
- Clare Stone as Emma
- Nancy E.L. Ward as Lillian
- Janine Theriault as Beatrice

== Awards and nominations ==
=== Young Artist Awards ===
Year	Nominee / work	Award	Result
2005	Olivia Ballantyne	Best Performance in a TV Movie, Miniseries Or Special — Supporting Young Actress	Won
2005	Samantha: An American Girl Holiday	Best Family Television Movie or Special	Nominated
2005	AnnaSophia Robb	Best Performance in a TV Movie, Miniseries or Special – Leading Young Actress	Nominated
