= American Girl (film series) =

- Directed by: Nadia Tass (Samantha/Felicity/Lea); Joyce Chopra (Molly); Patricia Rozema (Kit); Martha Coolidge (Chrissa); Vince Marcello (McKenna/Saige/Isabelle/Grace); Tina Mabry (Melody); Valerie Weiss (Maryellen)
- Written by: Anna Sandor (Samantha/Felicity/Molly); Ann Peacock (Kit); Mary Casanova/Christine Coyle Johnson (Chrissa); Jessica O'Toole and Amy Rardin (McKenna/Saige/Isabelle/Grace); Karen Bloch Morse (Lea); Alison McDonald (Melody); Jamie Pachino (Maryellen)
- Based on: the American Girl book series by various authors
- Production company: Mattel Films
- Distributed by: Warner Bros. Pictures (1-4); HBO Films (5); Universal Pictures (6-10); Amazon Studios (11-15); Paramount Pictures (TBA)
- Country: United States
- Language: English

American Girl is a line of books, movies, dolls, and accessories based on pre-teen girl characters (aged 9–12) from various periods of history including the 21st century. Several of the characters from the American Girl books have since had their stories adapted into films, the majority of them released as direct-to-DVD or television films, with the exception of Kit Kittredge: An American Girl, which was a theatrical release. Starting with the debut of the Maryellen Larkin doll, American Girl has since expressed interest in producing webseries based on their characters.

== Synopsis ==
In 2004, American Girl teamed up with Julia Roberts' Red Om Films production company to create the first American Girl movie Samantha: An American Girl Holiday. Samantha was played by AnnaSophia Robb.

In 2005 came the second American Girl TV movie Felicity: An American Girl Adventure. It starred Shailene Woodley as Felicity.

The third American Girl television movie appeared in 2006. Molly: An American Girl on the Home Front featured Maya Ritter as Molly.

The first American Girl movie to appear in theaters was Kit Kittredge: An American Girl; it opened in wide release on July 2, 2008. It was produced by Picture House. Kit was played by Academy Award nominee Abigail Breslin and notable co-stars included Stanley Tucci, Chris O'Donnell, Julia Ormond and Joan Cusack.

The first Girl of the Year movie was entitled An American Girl: Chrissa Stands Strong. Chrissa was portrayed by Sammi Hanratty. It was released by HBO directly to DVD on January 6, 2009.

McKenna Brooks, the "Girl of the Year 2012", has a movie named McKenna Shoots for the Stars released July 3, 2012. The movie, starring Jade Pettyjohn as McKenna, started filming in July 2011 and aired on NBC July 14, 2012.

Saige Copeland, Girl of the Year 2013, has a movie named Saige Paints the Sky released July 2, 2013. The movie, starring Sidney Fullmer as Saige, was released on NBC on July 13, 2013.

A film based on Girl of the Year 2014 Isabelle Palmer entitled Isabelle Dances Into the Spotlight was released July 22, 2014, starring Erin Pitt as the title character.

A film based on Girl of the Year 2015 Grace Thomas entitled An American Girl: Grace Stirs Up Success, with Olivia Rodrigo playing the title role, was released June 23, 2015.

In November 2015, short independent films were uploaded on American Girl's YouTube page, based on the Maryellen Larkin and Julie Albright characters, the latter in lieu of the previously announced musical film project slated in 2007. The films star Harlie Galloway and Jolie Ledford as Maryellen and Julie, respectively, and mark American Girl's venture into digital content and independent film production.

=== Amazon's original American Girl live-action specials ===
A live-action web special based on Melody Ellison's stories entitled Melody, 1963: Love Has to Win, an American Girl Story was released by Amazon in 2016, starring Marsai Martin as the title character. Love Has to Win was then followed by An American Girl Story - Maryellen 1955: Extraordinary Christmas, starring Alyvia Alyn Lind as Maryellen Larkin and was released by Amazon on November 25, 2016.

Set in 1976 in San Francisco, Ivy Ling is a Chinese-American who struggles to balance her two cultural identities. With the help of her best friend, Julie Albright, Ivy makes a tough call on two important events in her life when her gymnastics tournament and family's Chinese New Year dinner land on the same day. The movie An American Girl Story - Ivy & Julie 1976: A Happy Balance was released by Amazon in 2017, starring Nina Lu as Ivy Ling, and Hannah Nordberg as Julie Albright.

In 2023, a film entitled American Girl - Corinne Tan: The Movie was released by Amazon on July 28. It was originally supposed to release on HBO Max and Cartoon Network in December 2022, but that never materialized. As of early 2024, it is currently featured on Netflix.

== Films and DVD release dates ==
Film	Main character	Region 1	Rating
Samantha: An American Girl Holiday	Samantha Parkington	November 30, 2004	G
Felicity: An American Girl Adventure	Felicity Merriman	December 6, 2005	G
Molly: An American Girl on the Home Front	Molly McIntire	November 28, 2006	G
Kit Kittredge: An American Girl	Kit Kittredge	October 28, 2008	G
An American Girl: Chrissa Stands Strong	Chrissa Maxwell	January 6, 2009	PG
An American Girl: McKenna Shoots for the Stars	McKenna Brooks	July 3, 2012	G
An American Girl: Saige Paints the Sky	Saige Copeland	July 2, 2013	G
An American Girl: Isabelle Dances Into the Spotlight	Isabelle Palmer	July 22, 2014	G
An American Girl: Grace Stirs Up Success	Grace Thomas	June 23, 2015	Not Rated/G
An American Girl: Lea to the Rescue	Lea Clark	June 14, 2016	TV-Y7
An American Girl Story – Melody 1963: Love Has to Win	Melody Ellison	October 20, 2016	PG (BBFC)
An American Girl Story – Maryellen 1955: Extraordinary Christmas	Maryellen Larkin	November 25, 2016	TV-Y/PG (BBFC)
An American Girl Story – Ivy & Julie 1976: A Happy Balance	Ivy Ling and Julie Albright	March 24, 2017	G
An American Girl Story – Summer Camp, Friends for Life	Z Yang	June 9, 2017	G
American Girl Corinne Tan	Corrine Tan	July 28, 2023	G
