= Felicity: An American Girl Adventure =

2005 television film by Nadia Tass

- Genre: Drama; Family
- Written by: Anna Sandor; Valerie Tripp (author of "The American Girl Collection")
- Directed by: Nadia Tass
- Starring: Shailene Woodley; Marcia Gay Harden; Robinne Fanfair
- Music by: Chris Hajian
- Country of origin: United States
- Original language: English

Production
- Producers: Terry Gould; Stephanie Langhoff
- Running time: 86 minutes
- Production companies: Revolution Television; Red Om Films; American Girl; Warner Bros. Television

Original release
- Network: The WB
- Release: November 29, 2005

Felicity: An American Girl Adventure is the second in the series of American Girl film series. It is a made-for-television drama film that is based on the American Girl children's books written by Valerie Tripp, and premiered on The WB on November 29, 2005. The film was produced by Revolution Television, Red Om Films, American Girl and Warner Bros. Television. The teleplay was written by Anna Sandor.

The film revolves around Felicity Merriman's adventures during the onset of the American Revolution.

== Plot ==
Ten-year-old Felicity Merriman is growing up in Williamsburg, Virginia, just before the American Revolution. High-spirited and independent, Felicity decides to tame a wild horse owned by an abusive leather maker/tanner, Jiggy Nye. Even though her parents Martha and Edward forbid her, she runs off to be with the horse, whom she names Penny. She eventually tames Penny and the two become fast friends.

Meanwhile, tension grows between the colonists. Some, including Edward and his apprentice Ben Davidson, wish for independence from King George III of England. Others, like Felicity’s grandfather and her best friend Elizabeth Cole’s family, remain loyal to the king.

== Cast ==
- Shailene Woodley as Felicity Merriman
- Marcia Gay Harden as Martha Merriman
- Robinne Fanfair as Rose
- David Gardner as Grandfather
- Eulala Scheel as Nan Merriman
- Lynne Griffin as Lady Templeton
- Katie Henney as Elizabeth Cole
- Juliet Holland-Rose as Annabelle Cole
- Géza Kovács as Jiggy Nye
- John Schneider as Edward Merriman
- Janine Theriault as Miss Frances Manderly
- Kevin Zegers as Benjamin “Ben” Davidson
- Daniel Gariépy and Alexis daSilva Powell as minuet dancers

== Reception ==
The film received mixed reviews, earning an average score of 63 out of 100 on the aggregator site Metacritic.

== See also ==
- List of films about the American Revolution
- List of films about horses
