= The Care and Keeping of You =

1998 book by Valorie Lee Schaefer

- First edition cover
- Editor: Michelle Watkins
- Author: Valorie Lee Schaefer
- Illustrator: Norman Bendell
- Language: English
- Publisher: American Girl
- Publication date: September 1998
- Publication place: United States
- Media type: Print
- Pages: 104
- ISBN: 9781562476663
- Dewey Decimal: 613/.04242
- LC Class: RA777.25 .S33 1998
- Followed by: The Care and Keeping of You 2: The Body Book for Older Girls

The Care and Keeping of You: The Body Book for Girls by Valorie Lee Schaefer is an educational children's book about puberty, female health and hygiene. It was written for readers aged eight years and older, and does not mention sex or sexuality. The book was first published in 1998 by American Girl, a U.S. doll company, under its Advice Library imprint.

Since its publication, it has received critical praise and appeared numerous times on The New York Times Best Seller list. An updated edition of the book was published in 2013 along with a sequel titled The Care and Keeping of You 2: The Body Book for Older Girls.

== History and background ==
In 1993, American Girl launched a bimonthly magazine aimed at preteen readers. Readers of the magazine sent in thousands of letters asking questions about their health, particularly related to puberty or body image. The magazine's editor Barbara Stretchberry said that "If you go back and listen to our readers, our girls, it was so crystal clear how much this topic was on their mind." American Girl founder Pleasant Rowland had the initial idea after reading a newspaper article about early onset puberty while on an airplane. She tore the article out and left a sticky note on it addressed to the book's eventual editor Michelle Watkins, which read "WE NEED TO DO SOMETHING ABOUT THIS NOW". They decided to publish an educational book answering questions about puberty in a way that would be approachable to young readers. It was published under American Girl's Advice Library imprint. The company had previously published advice books under this label about topics such as babysitting and making friends.

Rowland selected Valorie Lee Schaefer, a copywriter who had written catalogues for American Girl doll accessories, to write the book because she felt Schaefer's voice was relatable to nine- and ten-year-old children. Schaefer was pregnant with her daughter at the time that she wrote the book. Schaefer later commented that she felt transitions between life stages were not well-recognized in the United States, and she wanted the book to help girls understand the transition "from becoming a young girl to becoming a woman." The company conducted focus groups, and found that preteen girls often wanted to know about subjects such as when to begin wearing bras and how to look after their physical health. The letters from magazine readers and feedback from focus groups were used to determine the content of the book. The book was illustrated by Norman Bendell, and Lia Gaggino was credited as a medical consultant.

== Overview ==
The book focuses on the process of puberty and life changes that girls may experience during that period. Topics covered by the book include physical health concerns such as menstrual health and menstrual products, and identifying eating disorders. It also includes guidance on topics related to personal appearance such as hair care, shaving body hair, treating acne, and wearing bras. Each section ends with a Q&A style section answering common concerns. It is written in accessible language and uses anatomical terms. Schaefer described the tone of the book as being written in the voice of a "cool aunt", which she defined as "someone who wasn't so out of touch with her adolescence that she couldn't remember what a confusing time that was."

Although it deals with general health and growth during puberty, it does not include any information about sexuality. The original version includes a two-page spread featuring an illustrated diagram teaching readers how to insert a tampon. Some parents complained about the inclusion of this illustration, as they felt it was graphic or inappropriate. This illustration was omitted from the updated 2013 version of the book.

== Publication history ==
In 2001, American Girl published the workbook, The Care & Keeping of Me: The Body Book Journal, as a companion to the original book. Another companion book titled Is This Normal? was published in 2009. It was written in a Q&A format based on letters sent to the editors of American Girl which were edited by Erin Falligant. It featured illustrations by Norman Bendell.

=== Reprinting and two volume edition ===
In 2013, the book was updated and reprinted in two volumes. American Girl published The Care and Keeping of You 1: The Body Book for Younger Girls an edited reprint of the original, and The Care and Keeping of You 2: The Body Book for Older Girls, a sequel intended for older girls. The first volume includes more diverse illustrations, and omits the controversial tampon diagram in favor of information about menstrual pads which are more widely used by younger people. This edition of the book also omitted information about eating disorders and other subjects that might be upsetting to young girls, and reserved this content for The Care and Keeping of You 2.

Pediatrician Cara Natterson updated the first volume and authored The Care and Keeping of You 2, which was illustrated by Josée Masse. It is intended for an audience of readers aged ten and older, and includes more information about healthy social dynamics and emotional health in addition to physical health and hygiene. Among the topics covered in the book are menstruation, breast self-examination, healthy sleeping practices and acne. Kirkus Reviews noted that it was a good alternative to books such as Robie Harris' It's So Amazing, which include information about sexual topics that some parents may feel uncomfortable with.

=== Guy Stuff: The Body Book for Boys ===
A similar book aimed at boys between the ages of nine and twelve, Guy Stuff: The Body Book for Boys, was written by Natterson. It discusses the physical, social and emotional changes that boys may experience during puberty, as well as general hygiene and health issues commonly encountered during adolescence.

== Reception ==
Since its publication, it has appeared numerous times on The New York Times Best Seller list. Sales had totaled 5.1 million copies as of 2018. The book was well received and its publication has been described as "a turning point" in education about women's health. Allison Pohle, in an article for The Atlantic, described it as "a formative book for many Millennial women who were in the target audience when it was first published, and for younger generations of girls." Lauren Rearick of Nylon noted that it was published at a time when many girls did not have easy access to information about health or sex education. Rearick wrote that "there was something about its messaging, and its use of adorable cartoons to illustrate the growth of boobs, that resonated with so many readers."

It has been viewed mostly positively in retrospect, however some critics have felt that its content had become somewhat dated in comparison to more recent publications. The book's lack of sexual content has been cited as a feature that may make it more appealing to some parents. Some sources have opined that avoiding the topic of sexuality is based on the cultural expectation that children and adolescents must be shielded from sexuality. Rachelle Hampton of Slate criticized the decision to omit information about sexuality from the book, and felt that its discussion of teenage anxieties about body weight and appearance was overly negative.

Darienne Stewart of Common Sense Media gave the book five out of five stars, and highlighted its positive language, informativeness, and appealing illustrations. However, she noted that it "does include some negative messages about body image and dieting that could be damaging for young girls." Leah Campbell, writing for the website Scary Mommy, felt that the book contained expectations of heteronormativity and concern over body weight, and was no longer the best option for teaching young children about puberty.

Author Valorie Lee Schaefer acknowledged these criticisms, commenting that while not all parts of the book are relevant to each individual's experience, she felt it contains some information relevant for most readers. She noted that her daughter is gay and would not relate to content which assumes a burgeoning attraction to boys, but would be able to use the information about her body. Schaefer also commented that some of the information would be useful to transgender and nonbinary youth, despite the book not specifically addressing their needs.

== See also ==
- It's Perfectly Normal, book on puberty and sex education by Robie Harris
