= American Girl (disambiguation) =

American Girl is a line of dolls, books, films and accessories by Mattel.

American Girl(s) may also refer to:

== Film ==
- American Girl (film series), based on the dolls
  - Kit Kittredge: An American Girl, a 2008 American film
  - An American Girl: Grace Stirs Up Success, a 2015 American film
- American Girls (film), a 1918 Dutch silent film
- American Girl (2002 film), an American comedy-drama
- American Girl (2021 film), a Taiwanese drama

== Literature ==
- American Girl (magazine), a magazine about the dolls published by Mattel
- American Girl, a magazine published by the Girl Scouts of the US from 1920 to 1979
- American Girl (book series), based on the dolls
- The American Girl, a 2005 novel by Monika Fagerholm

== Music ==
- American Girls (band), a 1980s all-female music group
- "American Girl" (Tom Petty and the Heartbreakers song), 1976
- "American Girl" (Bonnie McKee song), 2013
- "American Girls" (Counting Crows song), 2002
- "American Girls" (Harry Styles song), 2026
- "American Girls", a song by FM from Indiscreet
- "American Girls", a song by Homie from the soundtrack of the film Meet the Deedles
- American Girl (album), a 1999 album by Juice Newton
- American Gurl, a 2022 album by Kilo Kish

== Other uses ==
- American Girls Podcast, a popculture podcast
- The American Girls (TV series), a 1978 US network television program
- American Girl (video game series), based on the dolls

== See also ==
- "My Own American Girl", a 2003 episode of the TV series Scrubs
- "Last of the American Girls", a song by Green Day from the album 21st Century Breakdown
- All American Girl (disambiguation)
- American lady, a butterfly
- American Woman (disambiguation)
