= American Girl =

American line of dolls

- The current logo for American Girl
- Created by: Pleasant Rowland
- Original work: Dolls and books released by Pleasant Company (1986)
- Owner: Mattel

Print publications
- Book: See American Girl (book series)

Films and television
- Film: See American Girl (film series)
- Short films: Maryellen and the Brightest Star (2015); And the Tiara Goes To... (2015)

Games
- Video game: See American Girl (video game series)

Audio
- Soundtracks: The American Girls Revue (2000); Kit Kittredge: An American Girl (2008)

Miscellaneous
- Toys: Various (dolls and playsets)
- Clothing: Dress Like Your Doll

American Girl is an American line of 18-inch (46 cm) dolls owned by Mattel. The dolls portray 8- to 14-year-old girls of various ethnicities, faiths, nationalities, and social classes during different historical periods. They are sold with accompanying books told from the girls' viewpoints. Originally the stories, dolls and accessories focused on various periods of American history, but were expanded to include characters and stories from contemporary life. Offerings expanded over time and currently include baby dolls (Bitty Baby), Truly Me dolls, which vary by eye color, face mold, skin color, hair texture, and hair length, and Girl of the Year dolls which are contemporary characters traditionally available for only one year. A service for ordering a custom-made doll with features and clothing specified by the owner dubbed Create Your Own, was introduced in 2017.

American Girl dolls were introduced in 1986 by the Pleasant Company. The company was founded by Pleasant Rowland in Madison, Wisconsin, and later headquartered in Middleton, Wisconsin. Its products were originally purchasable only by mail or phone through the company's catalog. In 1998, Mattel purchased the company for $700 million. The company has been awarded the Oppenheim Toy Portfolio Award eight times and was inducted into the National Toy Hall of Fame in 2021.

== Dolls and accessories ==
American Girl
- Molly McIntire, one of the first American Girl dolls
- Type: Doll
- Invented by: Pleasant Rowland
- Company: Pleasant Company/American Girl Mattel
- Country: United States
- Availability: 1986–present
- Slogan: Find your inner star
- Official website

The Historical Characters line of books and 18-inch dolls, which were modeled after 18-inch dolls made by Götz in West Germany (known as Germany from October 1990) during the late 1980s to the 1990s, were initially the main focus of Pleasant Company, founded by Pleasant Rowland in 1986. The original Historical Characters included Kirsten Larson, Samantha Parkington, and Molly McIntire. Each doll represented a fictional 9-year old girl living during a unique era in American history. Kirsten is a Swedish immigrant in 1854; Samantha, a well-to-do Edwardian-era orphan living in 1904; and Molly, a World War II-era girl in 1944. These original dolls formed the foundation of the American Girl historical collection, which aimed to educate and inspire through storytelling and play. This product line taught important aspects of American history through a six-book series from the perspective of a girl living in that time period.

Rowland came up with the idea after she returned from a trip to Colonial Williamsburg, where she noticed there was a significant void in the toy market for quality dolls which resembled children, and she saw an opportunity to provide a more educational alternative to baby dolls or adult dolls, like Barbie, which often attracted controversy for perceived sexualization and imposing unrealistic expectations for young girls. The original books were written at a third-grade reading level and intended for girls who are at least eight years old, however, they did not avoid significant topics such as child labor, child abuse, poverty, racism, slavery, animal abuse and war, but endeavored to share those challenges in a manner appropriate to the understanding and sensibilities of their young audiences. In 1991, Felicity Merriman, a spirited girl growing up during the American Revolution, was introduced as the fourth historical character.

Addy Walker was introduced in September 1993 as the fifth American Girl historical character and the first Black doll in the collection, debuting at the National Council of Negro Women's Black Family Reunion Celebration in Washington, D.C. Her storyline is set during the American Civil War, focusing on her escape from slavery in North Carolina with her mother to freedom in Philadelphia in 1864. Addy's six-book Central Series, written by Connie Rose Porter and vetted by Black historians, earned acclaim for its educational and culturally authentic portrayal, selling over a million copies within a year of publication. The character marked a groundbreaking expansion in the brand's diversity, serving as the only Black historical doll for nearly two decades and becoming a powerful tool for introducing themes of resilience, slavery, and African American history to young readers.

In 1995, Pleasant Company released a line of contemporary dolls called American Girl of Today. In 2006, the product line was renamed Just Like You; it was changed again in 2010 to My American Girl, and in 2015 to Truly Me. This line has included over one hundred different dolls over the years. Each doll has a different combination of face mold, skin tone, eye color, hair color, length, texture, and/or style. American Girl states that this variety allows customers to choose dolls that "represent the individuality and diversity of today's American girls." A wide variety of contemporary clothing, accessories, and furniture is also available, and there are regular releases and retirements to update this line.

Girls of Many Lands was released by American Girl in the holiday season of 2002. Each doll was 9 inches tall and represented a 12-year-old girl from a time in history; in addition, each doll came with an accompanying book. Along with specific ethnicities, the dolls were given a home country and time periods, such as 1592 England, 1711 France, 1846 Ethiopia, and more. Sculpted by Helen Kish, the dolls were meant for display only and were priced from $48 to $54. The doll line lasted until the Fall of 2005.

In 2001, American Girl launched a contemporary character doll named Lindsey Bergman, with her own story and accompanying clothing and accessories. A second contemporary character, Kailey Hopkins, was introduced a little over a year later, Her success led the company to develop contemporary characters each year, as part of a new Girl of the Year product line, and to launch those dolls each year on Jan.1. Every year since, a Girl of the Year doll who has her own unique story, challenge or talent has followed. For example, Mia St. Clair, the Girl of the Year for 2008, was an ice skater, and Marisol Luna, the Girl of the Year for 2005, was a dancer.

Bitty Baby is a line of 15-inch baby dolls targeted to children aged three and older. They are cheaper than the 18-inch dolls and as of 2024, retail at $60 each. In 2013, American Girl Publishing released Bitty Baby books, picture books aimed at girls ages 3–6.

The Bitty Twins line debuted in 2003 to represent slightly older toddlers and/or preschoolers. The Bitty Twins were the same size as the Bitty Baby dolls. They were discontinued in June 2016.

Hopscotch Hill School was released by American Girl in 2003. The dolls were 16 inches (41 cm) tall, came with jointed limbs and painted eyes, and had a slimmer overall body shape. They, along with the stories which came with the dolls written by Valerie Tripp, were aimed at elementary-age girls from four to six years old and were sold until 2006.

A reboot of the Historical Characters line dubbed as BeForever was launched in August 2014, complete with redesigned outfits, a two-volume compilation of previously released books, and a "Journey Book" for each character, with players taking the role of a present-day girl who found her way to the past and met up with one of the Historical girls. The line also coincided with the relaunch of Samantha Parkington, whose collection was discontinued in 2008. The BeForever rebranding was removed in 2019, and the dolls were again referred to as "Historical Characters."

In June 2016, American Girl unveiled Wellie Wishers, a separate doll line similar to Hopscotch Hill School aimed at younger children and with a focus on nature and the outdoors, positioning it between Bitty Baby and the BeForever/Girl of the Year/Truly Me dolls. As the name implies, dolls from the line wear Wellington (wellie) boots and have a body design distinct from the classic, Götz-derived American Girl dolls. The line was released on June 23, 2016. The names of the Wellie Wishers are: Willa, Camille, Kendall, Emerson, Ashlyn, and Bryant.

In February 2017, American Girl released a new line of 18-inch dolls called contemporary characters. The first doll in the line was Tenney Grant, a young aspiring country singer, and songwriter. Other dolls of the modern line include Logan, Tenney's bandmate and American Girl's first-ever boy doll, (Note: Outside of the Bitty Twins line, whose dolls consist of fraternal twins; Logan is the first male character doll and the first male doll in American Girl's mainline roster.) and Z Yang, who is interested in photography and making stop motion videos.

In May 2021, American Girl rereleased the six original historical dolls for their 35th anniversary. The release included Felicity, Kirsten, Samantha, Addy, Josefina, and Molly.

In September 2021, American Girl released a new line of 18-inch dolls called World by Us. The dolls and their books promote messages of various social justice issues that are age-appropriate for the line's target audience and cover relevant subjects such as racism, immigration, and climate change. The line debuted with three dolls: Makena Williams, Maritza Ochoa, and Evette Peeters. The line also features doll outfits designed by Harlem's Fashion Row fashion designers.

In 2025, The Washington Post reported that American Girl continued to attract interest decades after its founding, driven in part by nostalgia among adult fans and ongoing engagement with the brand's historical characters.

In 2026, American Girl rereleased eight historical characters for their 40th anniversary: Kaya, Felicity, Josefina, Kirsten, Addy, Samantha, Kit, and Molly. Additionally, a new line of 14.5-inch dolls was released as the Modern Era Collection, where six historical characters (Felicity, Josefina, Kirsten, Addy, Samantha, Molly) were redesigned in contemporary designs and outfits.

=== Girl of the Year ===
Girl of the Year is a line created by American Girl where it features one doll year round. The doll has its accessories and merchandise and her own story. The first Girl of the Year was in the year 2001, which was Lindsey Bergman, who was launched at a "contemporary character" and later repopsitioned as the initial character in the Girl of Year series. The current Girl of the Year as of 2027 is Daisy Davenport. Listed below are the dolls who have been Girl of the Year from 2001 to 2027.

Name	Year
Lindsey Bergman	2001
Kailey Hopkins	2003
Marisol Luna	2005
Jess McConnell	2006
Nicki Fleming	2007
Mia St. Clair	2008
Chrissa Maxwell	2009
Lanie Holland	2010
Kanani Akina	2011
McKenna Brooks	2012
Saige Copeland	2013
Isabelle Palmer	2014
Grace Thomas	2015
Lea Clark	2016
Gabriela McBride	2017
Luciana Vega	2018
Blaire Wilson	2019
Joss Kendrick	2020
Kira Bailey	2021
Corinne Tan	2022
Kavi Sharma	2023
Lila Monetti	2024
Summer McKinny	2025
Raquel Reyes	2026
Daisy Davenport	2027

=== Collector doll series ===
In 2019, American Girl launched the Collector Doll Series. The first doll was the Holiday Collector doll in partnership with Swarovski of which three were produced. In 2020, American Girl again partnered with Swarovski and released three collector dolls; the Sweet as Rose, Boho Chic, and Fuchsia Feathers collector dolls. Only one of each doll was produced, each of which had a gown that included 1,000 or more Swarovski crystals.

In August 2023, American Girl released three Disney Princess dolls: Jasmine, Belle, and Rapunzel. In September, they released a series of Nutcracker-related collector dolls, including a toy soldier doll in partnership with FAO Schwarz, and in December, they released The Classic Barbie by American Girl collector doll. In February 2024, American Girl released three more Disney Princess dolls: Cinderella, Tiana, and Ariel. In 2026, American Girl renewed their partnership with Disney, including plans to expand the princess line with an 18-inch Jasmine doll and Frozen dolls.

== Books ==
The American Girl fiction books have many different variations; each book series shares the some portion of the journey of one American Girl Doll character. American Girl Dolls were created with the goal of educating young children on history, morals, and life lessons through the stories that accompanied each doll.

The classic American Girl Doll books follow the journey of one of their historical characters and each series follows a standard structure through six books. This structure is: Meet (doll name), (doll name) Learns a Lesson, (doll name's) Surprise, Happy Birthday (doll name), (doll name) Saves the Day, Changes for (doll name).

Some of the American Girl Dolls also have Best Friend books which are books following the storyline of the best friend of one of the American Girl Dolls – a spinoff to the original series. Examples of these include Nellie's Promise by Valerie Tripp (2004), Very Funny, Elizabeth by Valerie Tripp (2005), and Brave Emily by Valerie Tripp (2006).

American Girl also published a number of non-fiction books which provided "life advice" for tween girls, as well as activity books including puzzle books, art and craft oriented books, journal style books, and more. The most well-known of the American Girl non-fictions offerings was the book, The Care and Keeping of You, which sold more than any other non-fiction title in the line.

== Films ==
In 2004, American Girl teamed up with Julia Roberts's Red Om production company to create the first American Girl movie, Samantha: An American Girl Holiday. The film spawned a franchise that was followed by Felicity: An American Girl Adventure (2005), Molly: An American Girl on the Home Front (2006), and the theatrically released 2008 film Kit Kittredge: An American Girl, starring Abigail Breslin.

In 2009, American Girl began releasing direct-to-video and television films based on the Girl of the Year doll for that respective year. The series began with An American Girl: Chrissa Stands Strong and was followed by McKenna Shoots for the Stars (2012), Saige Paints the Sky (2013), Isabelle Dances Into the Spotlight (2014), Grace Stirs Up Success (2015), and Lea to the Rescue (2016).

In October 2016, American Girl began releasing new films on the Amazon Prime Video streaming service, beginning with An American Girl Story – Melody 1963: Love Has to Win. This was followed by three more films: Maryellen 1955: Extraordinary Christmas that November, Ivy & Julie 1976: A Happy Balance in March 2017, and Corinne Tan in July 2023.

In February 2019, it was reported that Mattel Films and MGM announced the development of a live-action children's movie based on the doll line. Following the success of the live-action Barbie film, in December 2023, Mattel Films partnered with Paramount Pictures to develop a live-action feature with Lindsey Anderson Beer serving as the screenwriter and producer.

== American Girl Place ==
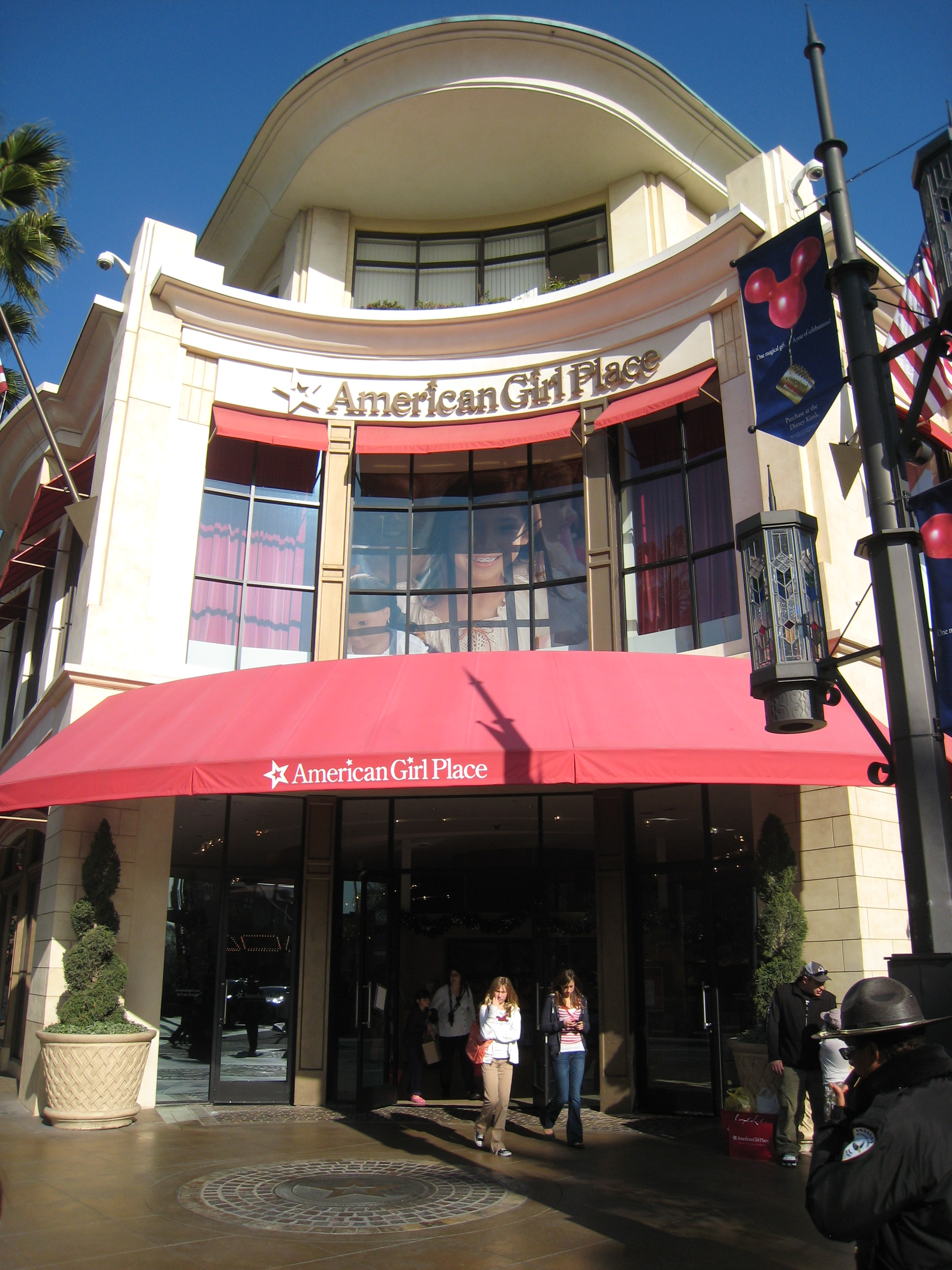
American Girl Place in The Grove at Farmers Market in Los Angeles, California

American Girl Place is a brick-and-mortar store selling American Girl dolls, clothes, and accessories. The first store, the 35,000 square-foot American Girl Place, designed by Nancye Green of Donovan/Green, debuted in Chicago, Illinois, in 1998. The original American Girl Place on Chicago Avenue also had a restaurant and 150-seat theater. It was followed by stores in New York City and Los Angeles, and then by additional, smaller stores across the US. Every store included some form of food service, and several doll services, including a doll hair salon where dolls can get their ears pierced and their nails done and a doll hospital where customers can bring in their doll for repair. Earrings and pretend "hearing aids" are also available to be added on for 18-inch dolls.

In May 2014, American Girl opened several new "store in stores" in Toronto, Ontario and Vancouver, British Columbia in Canada in partnership with Indigo Books and Music. All American Girl shops in Indigo stores were permanently closed in July 2023. In 2015, the company announced that they were expanding operations in Mexico with two stores at El Palacio de Hierro's Perisur and Interlomas in Mexico City, and a third in Polanco. All three Mexico stores closed in January 2018. In collaboration with Emirati shopping mall conglomerate Majid Al Futtaim Group, two American Girl stores opened in Dubai in 2017 along with one in Manama, Bahrain in 2018. All three stores in the Middle East had closed by 2020. As of February 2025, the company has seven remaining retail stores, all located in the US.

The Los Angeles flagship store reopened in summer 2023 at Westfield Century City after moving from its original location in The Grove. In March 2024, the store formerly located at Galleria Dallas in Dallas moved to The Shops at Park Lane.

State	City/town	Shopping center/complex
Illinois	Chicago	Water Tower Place
Texas	Dallas	The Shops at Park Lane
California	Los Angeles	Westfield Century City
Tennessee	Franklin	CoolSprings Galleria
New York	New York City	75 Rockefeller Plaza
Florida	Orlando	The Florida Mall
Virginia	McLean	Tysons Corner Center

== Magazine ==
The Pleasant Company ran an official American Girl magazine (not to be confused with the Girl Scouts of America-run publication also titled The American Girl which ran from 1917 to 1979) with its first issue dated November/December 1992. Aimed toward girls ages 8–14, the bimonthly magazine included articles, recipes, advice columns, fiction, arts and crafts, and activity ideas. By the mid-2000s, the magazine reached over 1 million in circulation. American Girl announced in late 2018 that the January/February 2019 issue would be the magazine's last.

== Video games ==
American Girl launched Innerstar University, an online virtual world featuring the My American Girl contemporary doll line, on July 13, 2010. Access to the online world was via a Campus Guide, bundled with the purchase of a My American Girl doll, which contained an access code for the creation of a doll avatar that then navigated to various games, shops, and challenges offered on the virtual campus of Innerstar U. In 2015, when the My American Girl line was renamed Truly Me, the Innerstar University website was shut down.

In 2023 American Girl collaborated with the Roblox development group Melonverse for a promotional event entitled American Girl World, based on the doll line and its roster of characters.

== Philanthrophy ==
The launch of Innerstar University was simultaneous with Shine on Now, a fund-raising effort for Kids In Distressed Situations, National Association of Children's Hospitals and Related Institutions, National Wildlife Federation, and Save the Children charities. The company has also donated "almost $500,000" over several years to national non-profit homeless housing group HomeAid. These contributions are mainly through its Project Playhouse program.The American Girl company also donated returned merchandise to the Madison Children's Museum, who then sold the products at an annual benefit sale for the American Girl Fund for Children. This practice and the benefit sale were last held in 2023.

== Reception ==
=== Product reception ===
The company has drawn criticism for the expense of the dolls, which cost as much as $135 without accessories as of June 2024 and $175 for a doll, book, and basic accessories. Buyers can easily spend more than $600 for a doll, outfits, accessories, and lunch in the company's store in New York. One critique of the doll line is that due to the price tag and limited purchase locations, the dolls are often inaccessible to the communities they are intended to represent.

Some aspects of the doll's characters and history have also provoked controversy. Some observers questioned why Addy, American Girl's first African-American historical character released in 1993, was portrayed first as a slave (in later stories Addy and her family gain their freedom after the Civil War), while Cecile Rey, American Girl's second black historical character, was portrayed as a well-to-do black girl in New Orleans. In 2017, American Girl released their first African-American Girl of the Year, Gabriela McBride, who is portrayed as a dancer, artist, and poet. In 2005, residents of Pilsen (a neighborhood in Chicago) criticized a passage in the book associated with the Latina-American doll Marisol, claiming it inaccurately depicted their neighborhood as dangerous. A senior public relations associate for American Girl responded to critics saying: "We feel that this brief passage has been taken out of context in the book." The 2009 limited-edition release of Gwen, an American Girl character experiencing homelessness, was also deemed as controversial.

In May 2014, the company was met with criticism on social media over its decision to discontinue four characters from the historical collection, two of them, namely African-American Cécile Rey and Chinese-American Ivy Ling, who represented ethnic minorities. They defended their move as a business decision, as they decided to "move away from the character-friend strategy within the line". The company has also drawn criticism for its recent focus on the contemporary line, specifically the Girl of the Year characters and their backstory, to which was viewed as lacking depth and more critical issues in comparison to the Historical/BeForever characters' backstories. My Little Pony: Friendship Is Magic series creator Lauren Faust also expressed her concern and criticism of the line in a Twitter post, stating it "was once radically positive for girls before it was homogenized for money".

The American Girl Place store in New York City was the center of a labor dispute with Actors' Equity Association (AEA). On August 3, 2006, 14 of the 18 adult actors at the store's now defunct theater went on strike together. AEA reached a two-year contract effective April 1, 2008. All American Girl Place theatres were subsequently closed in September of that year.

==== Permanent underwear controversy ====
In February 2017 the company announced that they were changing the certain doll's bodies to incorporate permanently stitched panties. Public reaction to the change—the first since the transition to flesh-colored bodies in 1991—was overwhelmingly negative, as fans of the franchise complained that it stifles customization and devalued a well-established brand "from heirloom quality to be passed down for generations to low-quality retail." The company reversed its decision in May 2017, and customers who bought a doll with permanent underwear were eligible for an exchange to have the dolls retrofitted with conventional torsos.

=== Storyline reception ===
==== Representation ====
Critics have discussed the issue of representation in American Girl Doll narratives. The company has stated that the "two most significant elements" in the creation of their stories is authentic specificity and universality. The Vice President of Marketing for American Girl has said that "the doll industry has a very heavy responsibility in reflecting what is true about our society". Valerie Tripp, author of many of the books in the American Girl series, says that her goal is to teach children to "challenge assumptions" and to teach them tolerance and compassion towards everyone; she promotes optimism and "cheerful skepticism" rather than "anger, resentment, bitterness, and jealousy." Some critics have argued that these narratives lead to a lack of recognition of injustices, maintaining that all Americans share the same privileges regardless of race or ethnicity.

Kaya'aton'my, a Nez Perce character set in 1764, has a story that takes place before American colonization which has been criticized for avoiding the issue of colonialism through pre-Western contact settings. American Girl worked with a Nez Perce advisory board in creating Kaya; the advisory board requested that her storyline take place prior to western settlement, when the culture of the Nez Perce tribe was flourishing. According to senior designer manager Heather Northrop, Kaya's face sculpt was crafted specifically for her, as it needed to vary from the rest of the line in which each doll is smiling just enough to show her two front teeth to accommodate the Nimiipuu's people's beliefs that baring teeth is considered to be impolite. Nanea, a character set in 1941, has a story based on Dorinda Makanaonalani Nicholson, author of Pearl Harbor Child: A Child's View of Pearl Harbor from Attack to Peace. Nanea's character is of split Hawaiian and European ancestry, so American Girl consulted with Nicholson, a woman with the same heritage, as part of an effort to share more inclusive perspectives and authentic stories with their audience.

==== LGBTQ+ ====
The 2021 Girl of the Year, Kira Bailey, has a storyline that "focuses on her journey to Australia with her mom, where she plans to work at an animal sanctuary" which is owned by her married aunts Mamie and Lynette. The inclusion of LGBTQ+ themes attracted controversy from conservative groups such as One Million Moms who viewed it as "attempting to normalize same-sex marriage".

In October 2022, the Harry Potter line of themed clothing and accessories for the dolls elicited controversy in relation to series creator JK Rowling's views on transgender people. Peyton Thomas of LGBTQ Nation opined that American Girl's inclusion of Potter-themed merchandise runs contrary to the toy line's stated mission of empowerment and inclusion, in particular its public advocacy of the LGBTQ+ community, stating "Is it ethical for American Girl to partner with JK Rowling? And is it ethical for you, the adult doll collector or nine-year-old doll enthusiast, to go along with the partnership? To purchase a Gryffindor sweater for Kit, or perhaps a plush owl for Addy?"

==== Feminism and gender stereotypes ====
American Girl Dolls were created to provide young girls with role models that were connected to historical events. American Girl Dolls and their stories are written with the mission of encouraging each child to "follow their inner star." The company says that, "we take pride and care in helping girls become their very best today, so they'll grow up to be the women who make a difference tomorrow." Readers have shared expectations that the stories portrayed in these books will reflect this message of feminism. Readers have also voiced disappointment in the way in which feminism specifically in relation to the professional world is addressed through the books. A critique of readers is that the brand offers empowerment through "girl power" and "self-determination" without addressing the system that leads to gender discrimination and inequalities in the workplace. The books address feminism in the professional world through teamwork, leadership, and talent but critics dislike how the books provide limited resources to work through real life issues females face in the workplace such as imposter syndrome and workplace harassment.

==== Historical accuracy ====
The books have been praised for teaching children about different time periods. However, some critics point out that this interpretation of the past is superficial and inaccurate. In response to this, authors have pointed out that these books are meant for children and at most are meant to give them an idea of the "chronology of American history", introduce them to some key events, an understanding of historical change, and give them an understanding that people of different ethnicities and socioeconomic backgrounds have often been treated differently.

=== Global relevance ===
Culturally, American Girl is firmly rooted in American historical contexts and belief systems. However, this inherent patriotism prevents the brand from appealing to a global market and attracting international consumers. Moreover, the majority of American Girl products, specifically their films and literature are monolingual, thus limiting multilingual communities from engaging with the brand, while simultaneously fortifying English as the apparent 'norm'.

=== Fandom ===
In 2015, the practice of creating and uploading American Girl doll-based stop motion videos (AGSM for short) was featured in a news report for BBC News' Trending site. Besides stop-motion animations and music videos set to popular music, the report covers recurring subject matters in said clips, such as cyberbullying and other social issues among children and teenagers, along with doll customization, photoshoots, and unboxing videos. Social media services such as Instagram and Facebook serve as platforms for fans of the toy line, spawning a community called AGIG, or American Girl Instagram, who photograph their dolls and post their photos on the service.

=== Unofficial stage musical ===
In 2026, after a creation process of two years, the stage musical Girl Dolls: The American Musical debuted at Fringe Arts in Philadelphia, Pennsylvania. On an estimated budget of approximately $90,000 the musical – written by performance artists Pax Ressler and Jackie Soro – tells the formative stories of two women who grew up in America in the 1990s surrounded by the influence of American Girl dolls and what they represent. Ressler, a transgender woman, and Soro, a queer biracial woman, sing 17 original songs that explore racial and gender identity using the dolls and their assigned identities as a larger metaphor. BroadwayWorld described the show themes as "prisms for the audience to dissect their own childhoods – what dolls meant to them, whether they belong in American culture, and what they're unpacking now as adults." The show is not affiliated with American Girl. It was nominated for five Barrymore Awards.

=== Podcast ===
In 2019, the American Girls Podcast, a book-by-book exploration of the series, was launched. Co-hosted by historians Allison Horrocks and Mary Mahoney, each episode discusses one book from the series, contextualizing the story presented and making connections to elements of relevant pop culture. The podcast received positive attention from The New York Times. In May 2022, the American Girl Podcast Network was launched. The first series of the network, American Girl 10-minute Mysteries, followed American Girl doll Molly McIntire as she tried to solve mysteries.

== See also ==
- A Girl for All Time
