= List of Recess episodes =

Recess is an American animated television series created by Paul Germain and Joe Ansolabehere (credited as "Paul and Joe") and produced by Walt Disney Television Animation. The series focuses on six elementary school students and their interaction with other classmates and teachers. Recess first aired on ABC from 1997, later premiering episodes on UPN from 1999 up through 2001 (for both networks), with reruns airing up until 2003 (for UPN) and 2004 (for ABC); reruns for the series also aired on Disney Channel, Toon Disney and Disney XD in the United States.

The show premiered on September 13, 1997, on ABC as part of Disney's One Saturday Morning, with the first season spanning 13 episodes. The second season premiered on September 12, 1998, including the show's first double-length episode. Disney brought the show back for a third season of 26 episodes which began on September 11, 1999, with 8 premiering on ABC, and 18 premiering on UPN as part of Disney's One Too. Season four aired five episodes on UPN alongside the third season, with 5 more episodes premiering on ABC from September 9, 2000 through January 6, 2001; the final three episodes were aired on UPN starting from October 31, 2001, with the last segments airing on November 5, 2001.

The episodes are listed in their packaging order by Disney, and not in their production or broadcast order.

== Series overview ==
Season	Segments	Episodes		Originally released		
Season	Segments	Episodes		First released	Last released	Network
1	26	13		September 13, 1997	January 17, 1998	ABC
2	25	13		September 12, 1998	February 27, 1999	ABC
3	52	26		September 11, 1999	February 27, 2000	ABC; UPN
4	24	13		February 29, 2000	November 5, 2001	ABC; UPN
Films	N/A	4	1	February 16, 2001		Theatrical release
Films	N/A	4	3	November 6, 2001	December 9, 2003	Direct-to-video
Special				January 16, 2006		Disney Channel

== Episodes ==
=== Season 1 (1997–98) ===
No. overall	No. in season	Title	Directed by	Written by	Original release date	Prod. code	Packaging code
1	1	"The Break In"	Chuck Sheetz	Paul Germain & Joe Ansolabehere	September 13, 1997	4345-002	ABC-01 (Note: "More Like Gretchen" and "The New Kid" were also paired as ABC-70 for ABC syndication from 2002-2003.) UPN-12
1	1	"The New Kid"	Chuck Sheetz	Paul Germain & Joe Ansolabehere	September 13, 1997	4345-001	ABC-01 UPN-12
Rebellious T.J. Detweiler is put on trial after an unsuccessful attempt of the gang to raid the kitchen's "good food", and is punished with no recess. Seeing how deranged he has become, the rest of his friends (including the sporty Vince LaSalle, the intellectual Gretchen Grundler, the rough-and-tumble Ashley Spinelli—referred to by her last name—and the sweet, naïve Mikey Blumberg) must try to break him out of detention by enlisting the help of the other students on the playground. A military boy named Gustav Griswold (referred to as "Gus") arrives at school, and the Gang takes it upon themselves to show him around. Gus is touched by their kindness, but is soon labeled "New Kid" by King Bob, which means he is officially the lowest of the low in the school social order. The other kids organize a scheme to resist King Bob's ruling, but it's ultimately up to Gus to defend himself.
2	2	"The Experiment"	Chuck Sheetz	Lesa Kite	September 20, 1997	4345-007	ABC-02A UPN-013A (Note: "The Experiment" and "Swing on Thru to the Other Side" were also paired as UPN-13 for UPN syndication.)
2	2	"The Great Jungle Gym Stand Off" (Note: Also titled as "The Great Jungle Gym Stand-Off" in episode guides.)	Chuck Sheetz	Joseph Purdy	September 20, 1997	4345-003	ABC-02B (Note: "The Legend of Big Kid" and "The Great Jungle Gym Stand Off" were also paired as ABC-40 for ABC syndication from 2000-2001.) UPN-01A (Note: "The Great Jungle Gym Stand Off" and "The Voice" were also paired as UPN-01 for UPN syndication.)
Butch (a mysterious kid who tells horror stories and urban legends about kid life) scares the playground with a story of seeing his older brother kiss his girlfriend and warning the kids that there will come a day where boys kiss girls (and vice versa) and they will like it. To prove this, the gang picks two people who will go through with the experiment, and things get worse when the two people turn out to be T.J. and Spinelli. All of the kids love "Old Rusty", the jungle gym that's the center of the playground. When Principal Prickly announces that a new jungle gym will be installed in place of Old Rusty, T.J. climbs onto the structure to protest. He's soon joined by his friends and the rest of the students, leading to a massive peaceful protest that involves the whole town. Note: (Despite airing and being produced after "The New Kid," Gus is absent in this segment.)
3	3	"Jinxed"	Chuck Sheetz	Scott Shelley	September 27, 1997	4345-014	ABC-03 (Note: "First Name Ashley" and "Jinxed" were also paired as ABC-38 for ABC syndication from 2000-2003.) UPN-14
3	3	"Officer Mikey"	Chuck Sheetz	Lesa Kite	September 27, 1997	4345-011	ABC-03 UPN-14
Gus is unable to speak after being jinxed by the Ashleys; he can only talk again if someone says his name, and the Ashleys work to prevent this from happening. Mikey wants to become a safety ranger, which causes the gang to get help from others in order to make his dream come true.
4	4	"First Name Ashley"	Chuck Sheetz	Holly Huckins	October 4, 1997	4345-012	ABC-04 UPN-03
4	4	"To Finster With Love"	Chuck Sheetz	Written by : Jeffrey Wright; Idea by : Nahnatchka Khan	October 4, 1997	4345-0XX	ABC-04 UPN-03
Miss Finster's snitch Randall seeks revenge on Spinelli, and finds the perfect ammunition in her school record: her first name, which is unknown to the whole playground, is "Ashley". Things only get worse for the embarrassed Spinelli when the Ashleys, a clique of popular girls who all share the same name, decide that they must initiate her into their group with "Ashley-fication". The Gang decides to save the "old" Spinelli by enacting a clever, name-changing plan. Miss Finster develops a crush on Hank the janitor and begins dating him. This distraction affects their usual job performance, which causes imbalance in the schoolyard.
5	5	"King Gus"	Chuck Sheetz	Peter Gaffney	October 11, 1997	4345-017	ABC-05 UPN-15
5	5	"Big Brother Chad"	Chuck Sheetz	Jon Greenberg	October 11, 1997	4345-010	ABC-05 UPN-15
When King Bob comes down with a bad case of tonsillitis, he appoints Gus as the temporary King of the Playground while he recovers from surgery. Soon, the power goes to Gus's head, and he starts bossing the other students around and demanding cookies. Vince develops a reputation as a hero for defending some younger kids, but he modestly protests he's not nearly as cool as Chad, his older brother. Everyone shares fond memories of Chad, and are shocked when he picks Vince up after school and reveals himself to be a stereotypical nerd, which Vince doesn't seem to realize. When the Gang points out the truth, Vince fears that he too will become a nerd, but he soon discovers that Chad's geeky nature is cool in its own way.
6	6	"My Fair Gretchen"	Chuck Sheetz	Holly Huckins	October 18, 1997	4345-0XX	ABC-06A (Note: "Teachers' Lounge" and "My Fair Gretchen" were also paired as ABC-37 for ABC syndication from 2000-2003.) UPN-016A (Note: "My Fair Gretchen" and "The Kid Came Back" were also paired as UPN-19 for UPN syndication.)
6	6	"Speedy, We Hardly Knew Ye"	Chuck Sheetz	Bruce Rubin	October 18, 1997	4345-0XX	ABC-06B UPN-05A (Note: "Speedy, We Hardly Knew Ye" and "I Will Kick No More Forever" were also paired as UPN-19 for UPN syndication.)
When Gretchen gets a perfect score on a standardized test, Principal Prickly plans to send her to Oppenheimer Academy, a school for gifted children. Gretchen doesn't want to go, as she'll be separated from her friends, so the Gang hatches a plan to have her act stupid during a placement interview to trick the panel. Speedy, the class hamster, dies, so the kids decide to throw a funeral, which does not go as expected when each of the classes revealed that the Speedy who died is not the same Speedy they had as a class pet.
7	7	"I Will Kick No More Forever"	Chuck Sheetz	Michael Kramer	October 25, 1997	4345-0XX	ABC-07A UPN-05B
7	7	"The Kid Came Back"	Chuck Sheetz	Story by : Rachel Lipman; Teleplay by : Holly Huckins	October 25, 1997	4345-0XX	ABC-07B UPN-16B
When Ashley Q. outkicks Vince during a kickball game (without even paying attention), his spirit and talent are crushed. Vince vows to never play kickball again, and becomes a lonely shut-in obsessed with his "glory days" of the previous months. The Gang decides to use one of Gretchen's experiments to bring back Vince's confidence and skill. A stranger, known as the Peanut Butter Kid, tries to follow the gang everywhere, and it drives them crazy after being convinced he brings bad luck.
8	8	"The Pest"	Chuck Sheetz	Rachel Lipman	November 1, 1997	4345-0XX	ABC-08A UPN-019A (Note: "The Pest" and "Kids in the Mist" were also paired as UPN-19 for UPN syndication.)
8	8	"The Legend of Big Kid"	Chuck Sheetz	Peter Gaffney	November 1, 1997	4345-0XX	ABC-08B (Note: "The Legend of Big Kid" and "Good Ole T.J." were also paired as ABC-69 for ABC syndication from 2002-2003.) UPN-04A (Note: "The Legend of Big Kid" and "Parents' Night" were also paired as UPN-4 for UPN syndication.)
Gretchen becomes increasingly bothered by Jeffrey, who has fallen head over heels in love with her. T.J. is captured by the kindergarteners, depicted as wild "savages" with their own society and rules. As he spends time among them, he gradually regresses to a kindergarten mindset. Meanwhile, the Gang, led by Vince, go on a search and rescue mission to find T.J. before he becomes a kindergartener forever.
9	9	"The Box"	Susie Dietter	Jeff Wright	November 8, 1997	4345-0XX	ABC-09 UPN-17
9	9	"The Trial"	Chuck Sheetz	Scott Shelley	November 8, 1997	4345-0XX	ABC-09 UPN-17
Miss Finster, angry that her rules seem to be ineffective, devises a new punishment for children: "The Box", a square of chalk drawn on the ground (similar to solitary confinement). T.J. is the first victim of the Box, and discovers its power when it completely shatters his spirit and makes him into Miss Finster's subservient "good boy". With help from Gretchen's Freudian knowledge, the Gang tries to get T.J. back to normal. A dirt-clod fight among the whole school takes a turn for the serious when Randall claims that Spinelli threw a rock at him, which violates the "rules of war". King Bob demands a trial, with Gretchen forced into the role of prosecutor (via her intelligence) and T.J. as Spinelli's defense. Randall, Mikey, and Spinelli share their versions of what happened on that fateful day, and everyone gets a surprise when they determine the true culprit.
10	10	"Teacher's Lounge"	Chuck Sheetz	Jon Greenberg	November 15, 1997	4345-0XX	ABC-10 UPN-18
10	10	"Randall's Reform"	Chuck Sheetz	Rachel Lipman	November 15, 1997	4345-0XX	ABC-10 UPN-18
Intrigued by its secrecy, the kids try to find out what the teacher's lounge looks like. T.J. and the gang finally accept Randall into their group, but could it be a trap?
11	11	"Rainy Days"	Chuck Sheetz	Lane Raichert	November 22, 1997	4345-0XX	ABC-11 UPN-02 (Note: "The Story of Whomps" and "Rainy Days" were also paired as UPN-66 for UPN syndication from 2001-2003.) (Note: These segments were aired in opposite order on UPN.)
11	11	"The Great Can Drive"	Chuck Sheetz	Written by : Michael Kramer; Idea by : Gary Glasberg	November 22, 1997	4345-0XX	ABC-11 UPN-02
A lengthy rainstorm leads to the dreaded indoor recess, complete with a box of old board games, puzzles with missing pieces, and Randall calling a game of Bingo. The Gang is sure that they'll survive, until Butch tells them the story of a class of kids who, after five days of being cooped up, became the "Zombie Class of '89" (which Miss Finster proudly confirms). Now the group must avoid the same fate, even if it means braving Mother Nature herself to do it. Mikey is the only one in Miss Grotke's class who decides to collect cans for the annual Can Drive after the other kids drop out, not wanting to lose against the Ashleys again; this eventually results in a massive rivalry escalating between the classes over who collects the most cans.
12	12	"The Voice"	Chuck Sheetz & Susie Dietter	Jon Greenberg	January 10, 1998	4345-0XX	ABC-12A UPN-01B
12	12	"Kids in the Mist"	Chuck Sheetz	Written by : Holly Huckins & Joe Ansolabehere; Idea by : Yule E. Caise	January 10, 1998	4345-0XX	ABC-12B UPN-19B
When Principal Prickly discovers that Mikey sings like Robert Goulet (who portrays Mikey's singing voice), he has a beautiful, young music teacher named Miss Salamone (voiced by Glenne Headly) help him prepare for the school concert, and soon after working with her, Mikey starts to fall in love with Miss Salamone but is heartbroken when her boyfriend shows up to the music room and proposes to her. Will Mikey perform on stage? Guest Star: Robert Goulet as Mikey's singing voice. A researcher named Dr. Quilty wants to research about recess. When she first tries it, she fails, and T.J. and the gang decide to help her out by making a documentary film about recess.
13	13	"Parents' Night"	Chuck Sheetz	Holly Huckins	January 17, 1998	4345-0XX	ABC-13A UPN-04B (Note: "Parents' Night" and "Bad Hair Day" were also paired as UPN-67 for UPN syndication from 2002-2003.)
13	13	"Swing on Thru to the Other Side"	Chuck Sheetz	Story by : Rachel Lipman; Teleplay by : Joe Ansolabehere	January 17, 1998	4345-0XX	ABC-13B UPN-13B
Spinelli is apprehensive about her parents attending Parents' Night and the gang must find out why. Guest Star: Katey Sagal as Flo Spinelli. Spinelli creates a pseudo-religious philosophy after she comes to the belief that fourth grader Swinger Girl swung over the top and never came back down. Note: This segment was initially banned from syndication by ABC following its premiere.

=== Season 2 (1998–99) ===
No. overall	No. in season	Title	Directed by	Written by	Original release date	Prod. code	Packaging code
14	1	"The Break-Up"	Chuck Sheetz	Michael Kramer	September 12, 1998	4345-103	ABC-14A UPN-09A (Note: "The Break-Up" and "The Beauty Contest" were also paired as UPN-09 for UPN and ABC syndication.)
14	1	"The Hypnotist"	Susie Dietter	David Shane	September 12, 1998	4345-104	ABC-14B UPN-20A (Note: "The Hypnotist" and "Mama's Girl" were also paired as UPN-20 for UPN and ABC syndication.)
The gang breaks up when T.J. can't decide whom he should write about in a school report about best friends. A hypnotist who the gang thinks is hooey and bogus inadvertently causes Principal Prickly to think he is six years old, and he takes to the playground to have fun. The Gang discovers "Petey's" new attitude and quickly befriends him, but things take a turn for the worse when Miss Finster decides to take over as principal until the trance can be broken. The kids are forced to find a way to bring the old Prickly back, despite Petey's protests that he wants to stay a child.
15	2	"Mama's Girl"	Chuck Sheetz	Mark Drop; Based on an Idea by: C.D. Payne	September 19, 1998	4345-106	ABC-15A UPN-20B
15	2	"Outcast Ashley"	Chuck Sheetz	Doria Biddle	September 19, 1998	4345-101	ABC-15B UPN-10A (Note: "Outcast Ashley" and "The Lost Ball" were paired as UPN-10 for UPN syndication.)
Spinelli, who secretly has a good relationship with Miss Grotke, inadvertently calls the teacher "Mama" to warn her of danger. Her tough reputation is soon in tatters as everyone calls her a "Mama's girl," and the bullying becomes so bad that she refuses to go to school ever again. The rest of the Gang tries to restore her confidence, with help from Miss Grotke, who refuses to tolerate bullies. When Ashley A. forgets "Purple Day" (a holiday that commemorates the day the Ashleys first met), the other girls kick her out of their group. The lonely Ashley A. befriends Gretchen, who's been neglected by the Gang lately; the two actually develop a positive relationship, which makes both the Gang and the other Ashleys upset. Gretchen is soon caught between both the warring cliques and her own longing to be a "popular girl" for once in her life. Note: This is the last episode to feature Ross Malinger as the voice of TJ.
16	3	"The Game"	Chuck Sheetz	Peter Gaffney	September 26, 1998	4345-107	ABC-16A UPN-21A (Note: "The Game" and "Wild Child" were paired as UPN-21 for UPN syndication.) (Note: "The Game" and "The Bet" were also paired as UPN-68 for UPN syndication in 2003.)
16	3	"The Lost Ball"	Chuck Sheetz	Holly Huckins	September 26, 1998	4345-102	ABC-16B UPN-10B
A new craze called "Ajimbo" sweeps across the playground, brainwashing all the kids at recess. Can T.J. resist and bring back his friends, or will he be swept in as well? Note: This is the first episode to feature Andrew Lawrence as the voice of T.J. A kickball falls into the mysterious back garden of a mansion, and it is up to Gus to retrieve it.
17	4	"Gus' Last Stand"	Chuck Sheetz	Jonathan Rosenthal	October 3, 1998	4345-108	ABC-17 UPN-22
17	4	"Operation Field Trip"	Chuck Sheetz	Michael Kramer	October 3, 1998	4345-110	ABC-17 UPN-22
After his old victim moves away, school bully Gelman decides that Gus will be the new target for his abuse, making the smaller boy afraid to even step on the playground. After numerous schemes to protect himself fail, Gus talks to his military father for advice, and ultimately decides to stand up to Gelman once and for all. The other kids, moved by his bravery, join in the fight. The school is going on a field trip, but when T.J.'s class's bus breaks down in the middle of nowhere, T.J. and the rest of the kids on the bus must find a way to fix it.
18	5	"The Challenge"	Chuck Sheetz	Jon Greenberg	October 10, 1998	4345-111	ABC-18A UPN-08A (Note: "The Challenge" and "Dance Lessons" were also paired as UPN-08 for UPN and ABC syndication.)
18	5	"Wild Child"	Chuck Sheetz	Mark Drop	October 10, 1998	4345-109	ABC-18B UPN-21B
Principal Prickly's brother (voiced by Martin Mull) is principal of a rival elementary school. The siblings square off over a bet based on a game of kickball with the gang playing off against their doubles. The Gang volunteers for the "Pee Wee Pals" program, which will pair them up with kindergarteners, in exchange for passes to a local amusement park. Most of the group is able to find common ground with their smaller friends, but T.J. struggles to make a connection with his own kindergartener. As he quests to find a hobby they can both enjoy, he inadvertently raises the fury of the whole playground.
19	6	"The Substitute"	Susie Dietter	Phil Walsh	October 31, 1998	4345-115	ABC-19 UPN-07
19	6	"Gretchen and the Secret of Yo"	Chuck Sheetz	Doria Biddle; Based on an Idea by: Julie Forte	October 31, 1998	4345-116	ABC-19 UPN-07
A mysterious substitute by the name of Mr. E takes over Miss Grotke's class while she is away. While everyone is impressed with the way he handles the class, T.J. wants everyone else to remember how great Miss Grotke is. Gretchen longs to be good at some kind of athletic activity, and discovers that she has a hidden talent for the yo-yo. Encouraged by rumors of a former yo-yoing master (guest star Brian Doyle-Murray) living nearby, she becomes his pupil and works to become a true "master of Yo", eventually leading her to the statewide championships, but her desire for greatness causes Gretchen to alienate herself from her friends and she wonders if her new passion is worth it. Note: This episode first aired on Brian Doyle-Murray's 53rd birthday.
20	7	"The Girl Was Trouble"	Chuck Sheetz	Mark Drop	November 7, 1998	4345-117	ABC-20 UPN-23
20	7	"Copycat Kid"	Chuck Sheetz	Holly Huckins	November 7, 1998	4345-114	ABC-20 UPN-23
In this deliberately monochrome send-up of film noir, Gretchen recounts the tale of how she fell in with the "seedy underbelly" of Third Street School in a quest to recover Galileo, a personal handheld computer she received as a birthday present. Her journey has her cross paths with the worst troublemakers in the halls, and she helps them with their pranks in an effort to get information about Galileo. Vince "saves" Mikey's life by catching a baseball moving toward his head, and the bigger boy decides that he wants to be just like Vince to gain popularity and coolness. Mikey's habits soon grow into an obsession as he starts copying Vince's clothing, style, and speech patterns. Vince, none too happy about being mimicked, hatches a scheme to help Mikey remember his true personality and teach him a lesson about what it really means to be cool.
21	8	"Operation Stuart"	Chuck Sheetz	Katy Ballard	November 14, 1998	4345-119	ABC-21 UPN-24
21	8	"Pharaoh Bob"	Chuck Sheetz	Jonathan Rosenthal	November 14, 1998	4345-118	ABC-21 UPN-24
Mikey rescues Stuart, a stray cat, who wreaks havoc at 3rd Street School. When the gang loses Stuart, he's found by the Ashleys, thus starting a fight between the two groups over ownership of the cat. King Bob orders the Kids of the Playground to make a monument in his name when he fears he won't be remembered after he leaves.
22	9	"The Story of Whomps"	Chuck Sheetz	Mark Drop	January 9, 1999	4345-122	ABC-22 UPN-06 (Note: "The Story of Whomps" and A Career to Remember" were also paired as ABC-67 for ABC syndication from 2002-2003.)
22	9	"Weekend at Muriel's"	Chuck Sheetz	Michael Kramer & Phil Walsh	January 9, 1999	4345-121	ABC-22 UPN-06
A scandal erupts at Third Street Elementary when "whomps" (a word T.J. uses to mean something that is unfair or unpleasant, similar to the slang meanings for "suck", "blow", "stink" and "bite") is accused by the school faculty and the administration for being a swear word. Spinelli is forced to spend a weekend with Miss Finster while her parents are away.
23	10	"Economics of Recess"	Howy Parkins	Rick Gittleson, Mark Drop, & Phil Walsh	December 12, 1998	4345-132	ABC-23 UPN-25
23	10	"Omega Kids"	Chuck Sheetz	Steve Bannos	December 12, 1998	4345-127	ABC-23 UPN-25
T.J. discovers that while he was out sick, the school has undergone a currency implementation, Monster Stickers. At first, T.J. is broke, but through hard work and investments, he becomes the richest kid in school and goes mad with power. All the kids at 3rd Street School have fallen ill after eating tuna fish tacos, leaving T.J. and the gang as the only students in school.
24	11	"Yes, Mikey, Santa Does Shave"	Susie Dietter	Mark Drop, Holly Huckins, & Phil Walsh	December 26, 1998	4345-130	ABC-24 UPN-11
In a Christmas special, Mikey is ridiculed when it's discovered he still believes in Santa Claus. When his efforts to prove that the man in red exists fail, he loses his Christmas spirit and refuses to perform in a school pageant, much to the chagrin of the students and other teachers. A chance encounter with a friendly old man (voiced by James Earl Jones) helps renew Mikey's faith, and he appears in the pageant after all, and discovers that the elderly man has a secret of his own. Note: This is the series' first half-hour special.
25	12	"Bad Hair Day"	Chuck Sheetz	Jeff Haber, Phil Walsh, & Mark Drop	January 16, 1999	4345-133	ABC-25A UPN-26A (Note: "Bad Hair Day" and "Principal for a Day" were also paired as UPN-26 for UPN syndication.)
25	12	"Dance Lessons"	Chuck Sheetz	Phil Walsh	January 16, 1999	4345-120	ABC-25B UPN-08B
Mikey is given a bad haircut after getting gum stuck in it, and Vince and T.J. lie and say it is a trendy new cut. Soon, every kid on the playground wants their hair styled the same way. When Spinelli is caught fighting in school yet again, Miss Finster calls her parents, and Mrs. Spinelli decides to enroll her daughter in a dance class to help channel her aggression. The friendly Russian teacher, sensing Spinelli's spirit, pairs with her "Mikhail", or Mikey, who reveals that he loves to dance but cannot find a partner able to handle his large size. Spinelli starts to enjoy the work, but when it's announced that the ballet class will perform before the whole school, she must choose between her friend and her "rep".
26	13	"Principal for a Day"	Chuck Sheetz	Steve Bannos	February 27, 1999	4345-136	ABC-26A UPN-26B
26	13	"The Beauty Contest"	Chuck Sheetz	Libby Bideau & Sandy Adomaitis	February 27, 1999	4345-146	ABC-26B UPN-09B
T.J. is made principal for a day, and the students are afraid that the power will change him. Spinelli is entered into a beauty contest by the Ashleys as a joke, and Vince convinces her that actually competing and beating the Ashleys is the best way to get back at them.

=== Season 3 (1999–2000) ===
No. overall	No. in season	Title	Directed by	Written by	Original release date	Prod. code	Packaging code
27	1	"The Big Prank"	Chuck Sheetz	Gregg Taylor	September 12, 1999	4345-144	ABC-55B (Note: "Tattletale Heart" and "The Big Prank" were also paired as ABC-55 for ABC syndication from 2001-2003.) UPN-27B (Note: "The First Picture Show" and "The Big Prank" were also paired as UPN-27 for UPN syndication.)
27	1	"Hustler's Apprentice"	Chuck Sheetz	Katy Cooper & Ned Teitelbaum	September 13, 1999	4345-138	ABC-72B (Note: This segment only aired in its packaging order on ABC during 2003-2004 syndication.) UPN-28A (Note: "Hustler's Apprentice" and "The Spy Who Came In from the Playground" were also paired as UPN-28 for UPN syndication.)
T.J. tries to prank King Bob so he can win the King's old title of Prankster Prince. Gus joins the Hustler Kid but causes trouble.
28	2	"Kindergarten Derby"	Chuck Sheetz	Jonathan Rosenthal & Steve Viksten	September 25, 1999	4345-142	ABC-29A UPN-52A (Note: "Kindergarten Derby" and "The Bet" were also paired as ABC-29 for its ABC premiere and UPN-52 for UPN syndication.)
28	2	"A Career to Remember"	Brenda Piluso	Leslie Wolff, Mark Drop, & Phil Walsh	September 18, 1999	4345-143	ABC-28B UPN-51B (Note: "Dodgeball City" and "A Career to Remember" were paired as ABC-28 for its ABC premiere and UPN-51 for UPN syndication.)
The annual Kindergarten Derby, a race wherein kindergarteners sponsored by older kids compete to win a wish from the playground's current ruler, hits Third Street School. Mikey refuses to participate, citing exploitation, but befriends a heavyset kindergartener named Tubby who is determined to do well in the race. The older boy explains that he was unable to finish his own Kindergarten Derby, and decides to work as Tubby's trainer to prove that being big doesn't make people matter less. The Gang ponder on what they want to be when they grow up, and Spinelli fears she may not have a future.
29	3	"A Genius Among Us"	Chuck Sheetz	Brian Hamill	September 11, 1999	4345-123	ABC-27B UPN-50B (Note: "One Stayed Clean" and A Genius Among Us" were also paired as ABC-27 for its ABC premiere and UPN-50 for UPN syndication.)
29	3	"The Spy Who Came In from the Playground"	Chuck Sheetz	Michael Kramer	September 13, 1999	4345-134	ABC-81B UPN-28B
In this homage to Good Will Hunting, Gretchen finds herself stumped by a tough math problem and leaves it on the blackboard; when it is solved overnight, the Gang has a stakeout and discovers that Hank the Janitor is secretly a mathematical genius. He and Gretchen form a friendship based on their love of numbers, but when word of Hank's prowess gets out, he's courted by every major scientific institution in the world for his talent, forcing him to choose between them. The gang make a friend of new kid James Stone (voiced by Jason Marsden) and show him all of their tricks. However, it's revealed that he's a spy.
30	4	"Partners in Crime"	Chuck Sheetz	Story by : Phil Walsh; Written by : Bart Jennett	November 28, 1999 (Note: "Partners in Crime" first premiered in Canada on Family Channel on October 15, 1999.)	4345-148	ABC-45B UPN-38B (Note: "The Dude" and "Partners in Crime" were also paired as UPN-38 for UPN & ABC-51 for ABC syndication from 2000-2003.)
30	4	"The Bet"	Chuck Sheetz	David Pitlik	September 18, 1999	4345-149	ABC-29B UPN-52B
After being ignored by the student body, Menlo and Randall join forces and start blackmailing the kids to do them favors and it's up to T.J. and his friends to put a stop to the duo. T.J. bets Vince that he can't go without winning every game he plays for one day.
31	5	"The First Picture Show"	Chuck Sheetz	Richard Whitley	September 12, 1999	4345-152	ABC-75a UPN-27A
31	5	"Gus' Fortune"	Howy Parkins	Ron Birnbach & Phil Walsh	September 19, 1999	4345-137	ABC-56B UPN-29A (Note: "Gus' Fortune" and "Rumor Mill" were also paired as UPN-29 for UPN & ABC-56 for ABC syndication from 2001-2003.)
T.J. finds out about the first Señor Fusion movie and vows to see the first show, but Principal Prickly (who is a fan of Señor Fusion) challenges T.J. to a trivia contest where Prickly will let the school go see the movie if T.J. wins. After playing with a paper fortune teller, Gus is told the next day will be his last one.
32	6	"Recess Is Cancelled"	Chuck Sheetz	Jeff Haber, Mark Drop, & Phil Walsh	September 22, 1999	4345-150	ABC-74a UPN-30A
32	6	"Tattletale Heart"	Brenda Piluso	Matt Rosenberg	September 22, 1999	4345-151	ABC-55A UPN-30A
The government officially cancels recess as part of an experiment, but things go wrong when the kids become slow-minded and depressed as a result. A huge food fight breaks out in the cafeteria, and Gus is the only eyewitness to the person who started the mess. He wants to tell Miss Finster, as she's threatened to take away recess if no one comes forward, but the rest of the Gang tells him that the "Kids' Unwritten Code" will label him a tattletale if he spills the beans. When Miss Finster begins personal interrogations of the whole student body, Gus finds himself fighting to keep from cracking.
33	7	"One Stayed Clean"	Chuck Sheetz	Bart Jennett & Gregg Taylor	September 11, 1999	4345-153	ABC-27a (Note: "The Barnaby Boys" and "One Stayed Clean" were also paired as ABC-51 for ABC syndication from 2000-2001.) UPN-50A
33	7	"Rumor Mill"	Chuck Sheetz	David Pitlik	September 19, 1999	4345-161	ABC-56B UPN-29B
The gang helps Gus (who has never had a picture day because of his constantly changing schools) stay clean so he can have a great school photo. The Gang notices that Mikey is frequently taken advantage of on the playground, but he shrugs off the abuse as part of his daily routine. The next day, though, all of the kids treat Mikey with deference, and the Gang soon discovers that a rumor about their friend pushing a boy into a girls' bathroom is spreading like wildfire. They do their best to hunt down the rumor's originator, and end up getting a surprise when they discover just who started the gossip.
34	8	"The Madness of King Bob"	Chuck Sheetz	Gregg Taylor	September 26, 1999	4345-163	ABC-66 UPN-31
34	8	"Call Me Guy"	Brenda Piluso	Ford Riley	September 26, 1999	4345-172	ABC-66 UPN-31
Continuing from "The Big Prank", King Bob becomes obsessed with pulling a prank on T.J. Gus loses his glasses and becomes cool as a swingin' boy named "Guy".
35	9	"Prickly is Leaving"	Chuck Sheetz	Julie Ann Sipos & Bart Jennett	October 3, 1999	4345-156	ABC-79 UPN-32
35	9	"Randall's Friends"	Howy Parkins	Milton Chassman	October 3, 1999	4345-165	ABC-79 UPN-32
Principal Prickly's wish of being a middle school principal comes true, but his replacements are an evil man named Dr. Slicer and his assistant Gilda, who are even worse. Guest Star: Tim Curry as Dr. Slicer. Randall gets the gang to pretend to be his friends on his birthday after lying to his father about having friends.
36	10	"Dodgeball City"	Howy Parkins	Gil Evans, Mark Drop, & Phil Walsh	September 19, 1999	4345-155	ABC-28A UPN-51A (Note: "Dodgeball City" and "No Strings Attatched" were also paired as ABC-57 for ABC syndication from 2001-2003.)
36	10	"Space Cadet"	Chuck Sheetz & Howy Parkins	David Pitlik	October 2, 1999	4345-168	ABC-30A UPN-53A (Note: "Space Cadet" and "Stand Up Randall" were paired as ABC-57 for its ABC premiere & UPN-53 for UPN syndication.)
It's dodgeball season at Third Street, and T.J., determined to beat his rival Lawson, creates a major bet on a fourth-grader versus fifth-grader game. Gus is the only kid who refuses to play, and the Gang soon discovers why: at his previous school, he was a dodgeball legend named "El Diablo" who swore off the game when he accidentally injured a kindergartener. When history repeats itself on Hector, Gus's kindergartener friend, El Diablo finds himself dusting off his old poncho for one last round. Gretchen gets a letter from NASA, telling her that she will be involved in the next space shuttle mission, which makes T.J. jealous because he wants to go into space. Buzz Aldrin voices himself.
37	11	"The Shiner"	Chuck Sheetz	Steve Bannos	November 6, 1999	4345-154	ABC-31A UPN-54A (Note: "The Shiner" and "Lord of the Nerds" were also paired as ABC-31 for its ABC premiere & UPN-53 for UPN syndication.)
37	11	"Stand Up Randall" (Note: Also titled as "Stand-Up Randall" in credits & episode guides.)	Chuck Sheetz	David Pitlik	October 2, 1999	4345-157	ABC-30B UPN-53B
T.J. comes in to school with a black eye and lies that he got it for doing something heroic and becomes the center of attention. Randall becomes the playground comedian and gains popularity, but the gang isn't laughing when they find out that he is fat shaming Mikey.
38	12	"The Biggest Trouble Ever"	Howy Parkins	Steve Bannos, Mark Drop, & Phil Walsh	November 7, 1999	4345-162	ABC-59 UPN-33
38	12	"The Rules"	Howy Parkins	Etan Cohen & Bart Jennett	November 7, 1999	4345-160	ABC-59 UPN-33
A statue of Thaddeus T. Third the Third, Third Street School's namesake, is to be installed on the front lawn of the building, but the Gang inadvertently destroys it while using it as a new climbing structure after one of the workers fails to secure it. They are labeled the "Destructive Six" by the media; initially the six are punished by being made to do chores, but that changes when the mayor announces a severe plan to send the kids to six individual schools, which shocks even Miss Finster as cruel. The kids must defend themselves in court to avoid this fate, and get help from a surprising source. This episode pays homage to both the 1979 film Escape from Alcatraz and the 1987 film Full Metal Jacket. The old King Morty's rules are reinstated after Vince and Lawson have a disagreement regarding a kickball landing in a dumpster.
39	13	"Gus and Misdemeanors"	Chuck Sheetz	Holly Huckins	November 8, 1999	4345-170	ABC-46 (Note: These segments were aired in opposite order on ABC from 2000-2003.) UPN-34
39	13	"A Science Fair to Remember"	Howy Parkins	Libby Bideau, Sandy Adomaitis, & Bart Jennett	November 8, 1999	4345-166	ABC-46 UPN-34
Some bad kids from school pressure Gus into shoplifting Beanie McGum bubble gum from Kelso's. Little Becky Benson idolizes Gretchen... or does she?
40	14	"Mikey's Pants"	Chuck Sheetz & Howy Parkins	Scott Redman & Phil Walsh	November 14, 1999	4345-174	ABC-63 UPN-35
40	14	"Here Comes Mr. Perfect"	Chuck Sheetz	Ron Birnbach & Phil Walsh	November 14, 1999	4345-1265	ABC-63 UPN-35
While trying to pick up a ball that rolled under a bench, Mikey rips his pants and his friends try to help him cover up the rip while they hide from Miss Finster who'll stop at nothing to find him and sew his pants. Jared Smith, a new kid, comes to Third Street and isn't as average as the gang hopes when he's better than all the students at the things they are good at.
41	15	"Good Luck Charm"	Chuck Sheetz	David Pitlik	November 19, 1999	4345-140	ABC-71 UPN-36
41	15	"Diggers Split Up"	Chuck Sheetz	Cary Okmin	November 19, 1999	4345-124	ABC-71 UPN-36
Spinelli borrows Vince's lucky marble to pass a math test on the day Vince needs it most. The Diggers have a fight and split up; the gang tries to get them back together.
42	16	"That Stinking Feeling"	Howy Parkins	Chad Einbinder	November 13, 1999	4345-164	ABC-32A UPN-55A (Note: "That Stinking Feeling" and "My Funny Valentines" were also paired as ABC-32 for its ABC premiere and UPN-55 for UPN syndication.)
42	16	"Lord of the Nerds"	Chuck Sheetz & Howy Parkins	Story by : David Stone; Teleplay by : Ford Riley	November 6, 1999	4345-159	ABC-31B UPN-54B
While playing football with the fifth-grade boys, Spinelli develops a crush on a boy named Johnny "Baby Tooth" V and ends up being the laughingstock of the entire school. When T.J. breaks his collarbone during a kickball game, he's forced to stay in a room full of nerds, known as "Pale Kids", who don't go outside for recess. Over time, he bonds with the Pale Kids over their shared love of comic books, and even starts to enjoy their nerdy hobbies. When he returns to the blacktop and endures teasing, he's determined to stick up for his newfound friends, who come along for a single day of outdoor activity.
43	17	"Schoolworld"	Howy Parkins	Scott Shelley	November 21, 1999	4345-135	ABC-73 UPN-37
43	17	"Bachelor Gus"	Chuck Sheetz	Sandy Adomaitis & Libby Bideau	November 21, 1999	4345-131	ABC-73 UPN-37
In this homage to 2001: A Space Odyssey, Principal Prickly installs a new supercomputer called the SAL 3000 to run the school. At first, the kids love SAL, as he is able to procure recess equipment and change the temperature of the drinking fountains at a moment's notice. But when SAL gradually becomes more autocratic and takes control of the entire school by imprisoning the teachers and the students, it's up to Gretchen and the rest of the gang to escape to the school's basement to power him down. The episode ends with Prickly advertising the SAL 4000 to Finster with each kid getting a restraint bracelet. Gus moves into Old Rusty at school after overhearing his parents' unfortunate plans to move again.
44	18	"The Dude"	Howy Parkins	Richard Whitley	November 28, 1999	4345-173	ABC-32A UPN-55A
44	18	"Bonky Fever"	Chuck Sheetz	Bart Jennett	February 20, 2000 (Note: "Bonky Fever" first premiered in Canada on Family Channel on January 14, 2000.)	4345-141	ABC-31B UPN-54B (Note: "Yope from Norway" and "Bonky Fever" were also paired as UPN-42 for UPN syndication & ABC-65 for ABC syndication from 2001-2003.)
A school legend, T.J.'s idol comes back as a teacher. Mikey's tenth birthday is coming up, and his mother inadvertently triggers a massive fear of becoming older. He gradually regresses to an infantile state by obsessing over "Bonky the Dragon" (a parody of Barney the Dinosaur). The rest of the Gang, concerned with Mikey's babyish attitude, does their best to break his addiction and remind him of what it means to be an older kid.
45	19	"The Candidates"	Chuck Sheetz & Howy Parkins	Etan Cohen & Mark Drop	November 29, 1999	4345-112	ABC-61 UPN-39
45	19	"This Brain for Hire"	Chuck Sheetz	Nancylee Myatt & Phil Walsh	November 29, 1999	4345-147	ABC-61 UPN-39
Vince and Gretchen run against each other for class president. The episode mentions the 1912 United States presidential election, when T.J. remembers that Woodrow Wilson took advantage of the split in the Republican party to gain the presidency. He supports a third party candidate, Ashley Armbruster, to split the vote for the girls. Gretchen does other people's homework in order to get the money for a new bike.
46	20	"The Barnaby Boys"	Howy Parkins & Chuck Sheetz	Rocket Rabinowitz & Phil Walsh	January 15, 2000	4345-145	ABC-31 UPN-56
46	20	"Buried Treasure"	Chuck Sheetz	Peter Gaffney & Jonathan Rosenthal	January 15, 2000	4345-113	ABC-31 UPN-56
T.J. and Vince become fans of "The Barnaby Boys", a series of children's novels that follow the adventures of two teenage sleuths, and get in over their heads when they try to uncover the mystery of the temporary janitor. T.J. discovers an old treasure map in an outdated history book, leading the Gang on a merry chase across the playground to find the mysterious valuables left behind by the map's writers. The Ashleys, Diggers, and Randall are gradually drawn into the hunt, and greed soon gets the better of most of the kids as they scheme to hoard the treasure for themselves. A speech from T.J. reminds them that the hunt is supposed to be fun, and they all recover in time to find the treasure, favorite toys that belonged to the map's creators, a group which includes Principal Prickly himself.
47	21	"My Funny Valentines"	Howy Parkins	Gregg Taylor	November 13, 1999	4345-171	ABC-32B UPN-55B
47	21	"The Ratings Game"	Howy Parkins	Ilana Wernick & Holly Huckins	January 22, 2000 (Note: "The Ratings Game" first premiered in Canada on Family Channel on January 19, 2000.)	4345-158	ABC-34B UPN-57B (Note: "The Library Kid" and "The Ratings Game" were also paired as ABC-32 for its ABC premiere & UPN-57 for UPN syndication.)
It's Valentine's Day and T.J. (who hates the holiday) creates joke Valentines that every girl on the playground takes seriously. The Ashleys make up a ratings system to crush the self-esteem of the kids on the playground, leading to chaos.
48	22	"Yope from Norway"	Howy Parkins	Bob Illes	February 20, 2000	4345-181	ABC-32B UPN-55B
48	22	"The Library Kid"	Howy Parkins & Chuck Sheetz	Doria Biddle & Holly Huckins	January 22, 2000	4345-125	ABC-34B UPN-57B
Gus is in charge of showing Yope, a Norwegian transfer student, around the school but begins hiding him from everyone when he realizes Yope doesn't know Gus is actually seen as a loser and lies to him that he's the school's "hot kid". A book report assignment sends the Gang to the library, where they share the tale of the mysterious "Library Kid", a girl who is rumored to live among the stacks. A quick hunt reveals the Library Kid, and they encourage her to go outside to experience recess. After some reluctance, the Library Kid soon goes "recess-crazy" and plays completely out of control, prompting Gretchen to lead the Gang in an effort to help her before serious problems begin.
49	23	"Spinelli's Masterpiece"	Brenda Piluso	Story by : Brian Hamill; Teleplay by : Ford Riley	February 6, 2000	4345-165	ABC-48 UPN-40
49	23	"Nobody Doesn't Like T.J."	Howy Parkins	Milton Chassman & Phil Walsh	February 6, 2000	4345-175	ABC-48 UPN-40
Spinelli lets off some steam by creating a chalk drawing and T.J. does everything he can to keep Miss Finster from erasing it. T.J. finds out that Gordy is the only kid on the playground who doesn't like him, and sets out to make him his friend.
50	24	"A Great State Fair"	Howy Parkins	Gail Glaze & Bart Jennett	February 13, 2000	4345-179	ABC-44 UPN-41
50	24	"The A.V. Kid"	Howy Parkins	Mark Archuleta	February 13, 2000	4345-182	ABC-44 UPN-41
Gus gets left behind, along with Gelman and Miss Finster, when Gus's dad forgets to give him his permission slip to his first great state fair. A.V. Kid must choose a successor because he's leaving Third Street for Portugal. T.J. and Vince would both like the position.
51	25	"Don't Ask Me"	Howy Parkins	Sandy Adomaitis & Libby Bideau	February 21, 2000	4345-180	ABC-64 UPN-43
51	25	"The Secret Life of Grotke"	Howy Parkins	Ford Riley	February 21, 2000	4345-183	ABC-64 UPN-43
Spinelli takes the place of the Guru Kid. However, her advice to the playground begins to backfire. The gang believe that Miss Grotke is a spy. But is she spying for or against America?
52	26	"The Fuss Over Finster"	Howy Parkins	Milton Chassman	February 27, 2000	4345-184	ABC-41 (Note: "The Fuss Over Finster" and "All the Principal's Men" were also paired as ABC-49 for ABC syndication from 2000-2003.) (Note: "Soccer Boy" and "The Principals of Golf" were also paired as ABC-82 for ABC syndication in 2004.) UPN-44
52	26	"Soccer Boy" (Note: Also titled as "Football Boy" in European episode guides & Disney+.)	Howy Parkins	Scott Redman & Bart Jennett	February 27, 2000	4345-178	ABC-41 UPN-44
Miss Finster sprains her ankle and can't keep up with the kids during recess. At first, T.J. is thrilled, as he knows that he can finally get away with all of his biggest schemes. But upon seeing Muriel desperately trying to maintain order on the playground, he and the rest of the Gang realize that they can't truly enjoy themselves if she is in pain. This inspires a playground-wide truce of absolutely perfect behavior to give Miss Finster a much-needed break, at least until her ankle is fully healed. Vince doesn't let Mikey join his five-a-side soccer team for the King Bob Classic, so Mikey becomes the goalie for Lawson's team.

=== Season 4 (2000–01) ===
All episodes in this season are directed by Howy Parkins

No. overall	No. in season	Title	Animation directed by	Written by	Original release date	Prod. code	Packaging code
53	1	"Fort Tender"	Gordon Kent	Nick Dubois	February 29, 2000	4345-201	ABC-80 UPN-45
53	1	"Germ Warfare"	Barbara Dourmashkin-Case	David Pitlik & Phil Walsh	February 29, 2000	4345-203	ABC-80 UPN-45
T.J. and the gang build a makeshift fort called "Fort Tender", only to have Lawson and his gang ruin their plans and steal it from them. Gus and Mikey are at war after Gretchen catches a cold.
54	2	"More Like Gretchen"	Nichole Graham & Barbara Dourmashkin-Case	Bart Jennett	March 1, 2000	4345-207	ABC-49B (Note: "Big Ol' Mikey" and "More Like Gretchen" were also paired as ABC-49 for ABC syndication from 2000-2001.) UPN-46A
54	2	"Prince Randall"	Richard Gasparian	Bob Illes & Phil Walsh	March 1, 2000	4345-208	ABC-50B (Note: "The Army/Navy Game" and "Prince Randall" were also paired as ABC-49 for ABC syndication from 2000-2001.) UPN-46B
Spinelli asks Gretchen to accompany her and her mother on a trip to a cosmetics museum so she can avoid boredom. While there, Gretchen inadvertently impresses Mrs. Spinelli with her vast knowledge and various talents, a problem that persists when she joins the Spinellis for dinner. Spinelli's parents repeatedly wonder why she can't be more like the polite and intelligent Gretchen, which leads the tomboy to swear off friendship with the brainy girl. Can Gretchen find a way to resolve the problem?. Randall, tired of King Bob not taking him seriously, discovers the playground's ruler in a compromising position at the mall and blackmails him with photographs. As part of the deal, King Bob is forced to declare Randall a prince and go into exile, and the snitch soon begins a reign of terror. The Gang, determined to save the playground from disaster, encourages King Bob to come forward with the truth, and share their own embarrassing stories to win the other kids over to the exiled monarch's side.
55	3	"Me No Know"	Gordon Kent	Gail Glaze & Ford Riley	April 30, 2000	4345-209	ABC-43 UPN-47
55	3	"Good Ole T.J."	Mitch Rochon	Libby Bideau & Sandy Adomaitis	April 30, 2000	4345-206	ABC-43 UPN-47
Vince feels left out of the loop when everyone on the playground begins quoting lines from the latest screwball comedy, Nitwits 3, and sets out to see the film, despite Vince's parents forbidding him because of how crude and immature it is. T.J. and Gretchen are finally partners for a project. Will it work?
56	4	"Old Folks Home"	Mitch Rochon	Ford Riley	July 17, 2000	4345-212	ABC-58 UPN-48
56	4	"Some Friend"	Brenda Piluso	Mark Archuleta	July 17, 2000	4345-213	ABC-58 UPN-48
Mikey signs the kids up to visit a retirement home on the same day as "Señor Fusion Fest", and the Gang reluctantly agrees to the plan, hoping to leave early to go to the festival. As Mikey fails to impress the senior citizens with his singing, the other kids discover the amazing stories some of the other residents – including a doctor who worked on the Manhattan Project, a female boxer and former merchant marine, and a retired baseball player from the Negro leagues, have to offer. T.J. has a mysterious friend that appears to be Menlo.
57	5	"Chez Vince"	Mitch Rochon	Milton Chassman	May 7, 2000	4345-211	ABC-60 UPN-49
57	5	"Tucked In Mikey"	Joan Drake	Jack Monaco	May 7, 2000	4345-210	ABC-60 UPN-49
Vince becomes one of the greatest chefs in the history of the playground with his newfound restaurant Chez Vince. Mikey is declared the first-ever poet laureate of Third Street School, and is chosen to recite an original composition at a special ceremony honoring him. Determined to write his best work ever, Mikey turns to Menlo, a master of organization and time management, for help in becoming more focused. But when Menlo's advice accidentally transforms Mikey into an efficiency-obsessed drone, the organizer teams up with the Gang to restore the daydreaming poet to normal.
58	6	"Beyond a Reasonable Scout"	Nicole Graham	Catherine Lieuwen & Bart Jennett	September 16, 2000	4345-214	ABC-36A UPN-59A (Note: "Beyond a Reasonable Scout" and "The C Note" were paired as ABC-36 for ABC & FO-59 for Disney's One Too syndication.)
58	6	"The Army/Navy Game"	Joan Drake	Ford Riley	September 23, 2000	4345-215	ABC-39A UPN-60A (Note: "The Army/Navy Game" and "Big Ol' Mikey" were paired as ABC-39 for its ABC premiere & FO-60 for Disney's One Too syndication.)
Mikey and Gus want to join the Woodchuck Scouts. When Gus's father finds out that Cornchip Girl's father is his archenemy from high school who works for the Navy, Gus and Cornchip Girl are not allowed to see each other anymore, but they decide to share a secret friendship that their fathers will not know about.
59	7	"The C Note"	Gordon Kent	Steve Ochs	September 16, 2000	4345-216	ABC-36B UPN-59B
59	7	"Big Ol' Mikey"	Jamie Huang	Bart Jennett & David Pitlick	September 23, 2000	4345-218	ABC-39B UPN-60B
After a mysterious figure drops an envelope containing a hundred-dollar bill outside of Third Street School, T.J. picks it up and shares the happy news with his friends, who all plot to buy extravagant things with their "fortune". But when Gus points out that someone must have lost the money, T.J. leads the Gang on a quest to determine the rightful owner. Their journey takes them through all of Third Street and to the mansion of Thaddeus T. Third V, who reveals that the whole scenario was a test of people's morals. Pleased with their honesty, he gives the Gang an even better reward. Gretchen and Galileo perform a test to determine how tall the Gang will be in the future. Mikey's answer is the most surprising: according to Galileo's data, he will grow to be fifteen feet tall! At first, everyone is pleased with the idea, but Mikey later has a nightmare wherein he grows into a monstrous giant that terrorizes the whole city. Determined to keep the world safe, he locks himself under a jungle gym and swears to never come out again.
60	8	"The Coolest Heatwave Ever" (Note: Also titled as "The Coolest Heatwave Ever!" in episode guides.)	Gordon Kent	Jack Monaco	September 9, 2000	4345-217	ABC-35A UPN-58A (Note: "The Coolest Heatwave Ever" and "No Strings Attatched" were paired as ABC-35 for ABC (2000-2001) & FO-58 for Disney's One Too syndication.)
60	8	"Mundy, Mundy"	Joan Drake	Mark Archuleta	November 5, 2001	4345-220	ABC-N/A UPN-63A (Note: "Mundy, Mundy" and "Lost Leader" were paired as FO-63 for Disney's One Too syndication.)
The gang try to find the school's back-up water valve on the hottest day of the year. Bad boy Mundy becomes very popular after he stops a ball from hitting a kindergarten girl and his friends blackmail the gang to help them restore Mundy's bad boy reputation.
61	9	"Lawson and His Crew"	Nichole Graham, Mitch Rochon, & Barbara Case-Dourmashkin	Phil Walsh	January 6, 2001	4345-222	ABC-53 UPN-62
Lawson is upset when the Gang yet again wins honor and praise from King Bob and the rest of the playground. The bully abandons his old friends to form a new crew of counterparts to the group: himself for T.J., Randall for Gus, Skeens for Vince, Swinger Girl for Spinelli, Menlo for Gretchen, and Kurst "the Worst" for Mikey. Lawson's new group seems to be far more efficient at helping others, pulling pranks, and even protesting the administration's decisions. This puts the Gang into a depressed state, and makes them fear that they no longer have a place on the playground. Mikey points out that despite everything, they are still best friends, and the group takes solace in the fact – which comes in handy when they're called to solve a problem not even Lawson's gang can fix. Note: This is the series' second half-hour special.
62	10	"All the Principal's Men"	Joan Drake	Jack Monaco	November 4, 2000	4345-224	ABC-47B UPN-61B (Note: "The Principals of Golf" and "All the Principal's Men" were also paired as ABC-49 for its ABC premiere and FO-61A for Disney's One Too syndication.)
62	10	"No Strings Attached"	Mitch Rochon	Milton Chassman	September 5, 2000	4345-219	ABC-35B UPN-58B
The gang tries to find out who removed all the balls from the playground. The Ashleys approach Spinelli to give her six tickets to an upcoming wrestling show, and don't ask for anything in return. Spinelli, suspicious of their intentions, rallies the Gang to determine what the popular girls might be up to. As they continually investigate, they run the risk of missing the actual show, prompting Gus and Mikey to take the tickets as an act of good faith. The search ultimately leads Spinelli, T.J., Vince, and Gretchen to the Ashleys' clubhouse, where they discover an unfortunate surprise.
63	11	"The Principals of Golf"	Gordon Kent	Ford Riley	November 4, 2000	4345-223	ABC-47A UPN-61A
63	11	"Kurst the Not So Bad"	Nicole Graham	Catherine Lieuwen	November 4, 2001	4345-225	ABC-77B UPN-64A (Note: "Kurst the Not-So-Bad" and "League of Randalls" were paired as FO-64 for Disney's One Too syndication.)
The kids think Vince is getting special treatment when he becomes Prickly's golf partner for a golf tournament against his older brother's school. Mikey discovers a surprising friend in Kurst "the Worst", a heavyset girl with an appetite that matches his and a mean attitude that doesn't. As they bond over sharing massive lunches, a true relationship begins to bloom, which upsets both the Gang and Kurst's group of fellow "bad kids". When it seems that Kurst is behind the theft of the cafeteria's huckleberry cobbler dessert, Mikey is forced to choose between defending his new friend or siding with everyone else.
64	12	"Lost Leader"	Brenda Piluso	Bart Jennett & Randy Fechtor	November 5, 2001	4345-221	ABC-78A UPN-63B
64	12	"League of Randalls"	Barbara Case-Dourmashkin	Mark Archuleta	November 4, 2001	4345-226	ABC-78B UPN-64B
T.J. loses his confidence after a series of failed plans and refuses to lead the group. Randall recruits the Tylers, the Ashleys' little brothers, to help him snitch on the other kids during recess.
65	13	"Terrifying Tales of Recess"	Jamie Huang	Mark Archuleta	October 31, 2001	4345-227	ABC-76 UPN-65
65	13	"Terrifying Tales of Recess"	Joan Drake	Jack Monaco	October 31, 2001	4345-227	ABC-76 UPN-65
65	13	"Terrifying Tales of Recess"	Gordon Kent	Bart Jennett	October 31, 2001	4345-227	ABC-76 UPN-65
In this tribute to Tales from the Crypt, Butch tells viewers three terrifying tales of Recess.: "Children of the Cornchip": Cornchip Girl eats some untested potato chips and finds herself turning into a werewolf at will. Gus leads the Gang on an investigation to track down the mysterious beast, who plans to transform the whole school into werewolves as well. Can the group protect Third Street from this monstrous fate?; "When Bikes Attack!": In a homage to Maximum Overdrive, Mikey's bike Pegasus comes to life when he leaves it out during a thunderstorm. Pegasus soon begins a reign of terror against the school, and the Gang goes through all manner of traps to try to stop the crazed two-wheeler. When they finally free themselves, they discover that all of their bikes have become sentient, and flee onto a passing school bus, which may not be the safest place after all.; "Night of the Living Finsters": Lawson dares Vince to spend the night in the Diggers' latest hole, and the rest of the Gang tags along. While underground, they discover a secret passage that leads to the "Finster Family Crypt", where all of Miss Finster's ancestors are buried. They get a terrifying surprise when the ancient Finsters rise from the dead to hunt them down, and flee to the school in an effort to battle the evil teachers.; Note: This is the series' third and final half-hour special, and serves as the series finale (despite being aired early for Halloween).

== Films ==
Title	Directed by	Written by	Original release date
Recess: School's Out	Chuck Sheetz	Story by: Paul Germain, Joe Ansolabehere, & Jonathan Greenberg; Screenplay by: Jonathan Greenberg	February 16, 2001
It's the end of the school year, and the kids are on summer vacation. But boredom quickly sets in for T.J. as his friends are headed for various summer camps, which means that he has no one to play with all summer. However, when T.J. discovers ex-principal Phillium Benedict's (James Woods) plans to get rid of summer vacation, he assembles his friends in an effort to defeat Benedict, find Principal Prickly, and save their summer vacations. Note: This was the only film in the franchise that received a theatrical release.
Recess Christmas: Miracle on Third Street	Howy Parkins; Principal for a Day, The Great Can Drive & Weekend at Muriel's: Chuck Sheetz; Yes, Mikey, Santa Does Shave: Susie Dietter	Paul Germain & Joe Ansolabehere; Principal for a Day: Steve Bannos; The Great Can Drive: Michael Kramer; The Great Can Drive: Based on a story by Gary Glasberg; Weekend at Muriel's: Michael Kramer & Phil Walsh; Yes, Mikey, Santa Does Shave: Mark Drop, Holly Huckins, & Phil Walsh	November 6, 2001
When Principal Prickly, Miss Grotke and Miss Finster get stuck in a snowbank during a snowstorm, they tell stories about their experiences with T.J. and the gang. Note: The episodes of "Principal for a Day", "The Great Can Drive", "Weekend at Muriel's" and "Yes, Mikey, Santa Does Shave" are shown as flashbacks.
Recess: All Growed Down	Howy Parkins; The Legend of Big Kid, Wild Child & The Kindergarten Derby: Chuck Sheetz	Bart Jennett; The Legend of Big Kid: Peter Gaffney; Wild Child: Mark Drop; The Kindergarten Derby: Jonathan Rosenthal & Steve Viksten	December 9, 2003
When the gang are captured by the kindergarteners, they discover their new leader, Chief Stinky. In order to escape, they tell the kindergarteners stories of how they used to get along with each other. Note: The episodes of "The Legend of Big Kid", "Wild Child" and "The Kindergarten Derby" are shown as flashbacks.
Recess: Taking the Fifth Grade	Howy Parkins	No More School: David Pitlik & Bart Jennett; Grade Five Club: Bart Jennett; A Recess Halloween: Peter Gaffney & Bart Jennett	December 9, 2003
In the series finale, T.J. and the gang enter fifth grade. The film is divided into three different sections. In the first part, T.J. goes up against the Board of Education after they implement new changes to the school. The second part follows the gang being introduced to the fifth and sixth graders' club. The third and final part deals with Spinelli, who thinks she is getting too old for trick-or-treating on Halloween with the gang. Note: Contrary to the other direct-to-video films, there are no flashbacks in this film, serving as the series finale.

== Crossover special ==
Title	Directed by	Written by	Original release date	Prod. code
"Lax"	Rob LaDuca	Mark Drop	January 16, 2006	219 (L&S:TS)
The cast of Recess visits Kauaʻi so Gretchen can use a telescope to examine what she believes is a new planet. Meanwhile, an experiment designed to make people stop working zaps Stitch, Jumba, and Pleakley with its lazy beam. Lilo and her new friends try to catch the experiment while Stitch takes a vacation. Note: This Lilo & Stitch: The Series episode (season 2, episode 21) is a crossover between that series and Recess.; The events of this crossover episode take place before Recess: School's Out.
