= Julie Ann Sipos =

American author, producer, and educator

Julie Ann Sipos is an American novelist, screenwriter, producer, and educator. She is the author of Horrible Women, Wonderful Girls: A Jaycee Grayson Novel (2025), which received the Writer's Digest Self-Published Book Awards Grand Prize, an Independent Publisher Book Award (IPPY) Gold Medal, a Foreword INDIES Book of the Year Award Gold Medal for Humor, and an IBPA Book Award Silver Medal for Humor. The book was also named a Kirkus Indie Awards finalist and an Eric Hoffer Book Award category finalist.

== Early career ==
Sipos began her career in screenwriting and entertainment. Her screenplay Adios, Dubrovnik reached the final round of the Academy of Motion Picture Arts and Sciences' Nicholl Fellowships in Screenwriting The screenplay was later listed among the Academy's 2003 Nicholl quarterfinalists.

In 2004, The Hollywood Reporter reported that Sipos was among the winners of the UCLA Screenwriters Showcase.

== Writing career ==
Sipos's debut novel, Horrible Women, Wonderful Girls, was published in 2025. The novel was reviewed or featured by outlets including Publishers Weekly, BookLife, Kirkus Reviews, BookTrib, NewInBooks, and Midwest Book Review.

The novel was selected as a BookLife Editor's Pick.

In 2025, Coral Gables Magazine listed a Books & Books event featuring Sipos in its June "Best Bets" column.

In children's publishing and entertainment, Sipos authored Love from Morning to Night: Poems and Songs for Mommy and Baby, published by American Girl in 2015. She is credited as executive producer and lyricist on the related American Girl Bitty Baby songs project. ABC News identified Sipos as an American Girl executive producer in connection with the launch of the company's Melody character and related media projects.

Sipos was also an executive producer of the American Girl film Lea to the Rescue (2016).

== Academic career ==
Sipos teaches screenwriting and storytelling at California State University, Northridge. CSUN Today identified her as executive producer of the statewide "Here's the Pitch!" television pitch competition and reported that a Student Academy Award finalist documentary developed by former students originated in one of her classes.

== Awards and recognition ==
- Academy Nicholl Fellowships in Screenwriting — Final round (1996), Adios, Dubrovnik; Quarterfinalist (2003), Adios, Dubrovnik
- UCLA Screenwriters Showcase — Winner
- Writer's Digest Self-Published Book Awards — Grand Prize
- Independent Publisher Book Awards (IPPY) — Gold Medal
- Foreword INDIES Book of the Year Awards — Gold Medal, Humor (Adult Fiction)
- IBPA Book Awards — Silver Medal, Humor
- Kirkus Indie Awards - Finalist
- Eric Hoffer Book Award — Category Finalist

== Bibliography ==
- Love from Morning to Night: Poems and Songs for Mommy and Baby (2015)
- Horrible Women, Wonderful Girls: A Jaycee Grayson Novel (2025)
- The Girlfriend Guide to Negligent Homicide: A Jaycee Grayson Novel (forthcoming)

== Filmography ==
- Lea to the Rescue (2016) — executive producer
