= Götz (company) =

German doll manufacturer

Götz Puppenmanufaktur
- Company type: Gesellschaft mit beschränkter Haftung
- Traded as: Götz
- Industry: Toys
- Founded: 1950 in Rödental, Germany
- Founder: Marianne and Franz Götz
- Headquarters: Rödental, Germany
- Area served: Worldwide
- Products: Dolls and related toys
- Website: www.goetz-puppen.de

Götz Puppenmanufaktur International (Note: The ö is a German umlaut. In case this letter is not available, it may be written as oe (e.g. in the company's homepage name www.goetz-puppen.de). In some cases the dots are simply ignored. Therefore one might as well find Goetz or Gotz instead of Götz in the references.) (often referred to as Götz Puppenfabrik or Goetz) is a German toy manufacturer, founded in Rödental, Germany, in 1950. This company was recognized internationally for their doll lines. Marianne and Franz Götz were the founders of Götz Puppenfabrik. The company is known to have provided the classic face mold of the American Girl doll line, back when it was owned by Pleasant Rowland.

== History ==
1950: Götz Puppenfabrik was founded in 1950, by Marianne and Franz Götz. Franz Götz personally sold and delivered the dolls to their first customers. Götz built the dolls out of papier-mâché initially.

1957: The doll parts were produced using the first model of the rotation-molding machine.

1964: The first reproductions of Sasha Morgenthaler's original artist dolls were manufactured.

1986: Pleasant Rowland, the creator of American Girl, used the model of a Götz branded doll when she presented her idea to create Pleasant Company.

1987: An American secondary branch location of the company was created in Baldwinsville, New York.

1989: Carin Lossnitzer's and Sylvia Natterer's artist dolls were reproduced, leading to an increased consumer base.

1990: A Hungarian and Budapest production center and secondary location were built.

1992: The doll company was given the "Spiel Gut" award.

1994: A Hungarian retail franchise was founded.

1997: Götz Puppenfabrik partnered with Pampolina, another doll company. A doll-and-child clothing line was released, in which children can wear the same outfits as their dolls.

1999: The second generation, Götz Family Anke Götz-Beyer and Uwe Beyer, claimed the corporation management. In Radisson, an American franchise and manufacturing plant of Goetz Dolls Inc. (another name for the company) was opened.

2000: Götz Puppenfabrik received the licensing of "Unser Sandmännchen."

2003: Due to the declining popularity, the final shipment of Götz Puppenfabrik dolls were ordered in Radisson.

2005: A partnership was formed with the Margarethe Steiff GmbH company. The company was given the license, "Hase Felix," in conjunction with the release of a doll from the film, "Felix - Ein Hase auf Weltreise."

2007: "Just Like Me" dolls were introduced as a concept.

2011: "Haarwerk," a toy collection of cosmetics with styling heads, an enlarged version of the doll head that cuts off at the shoulders, was released.
