= All American Girl =

All American Girl may refer to:

- All-American Girl (TV series), an American sitcom
- All American Girl (novel), a young-adult novel by Meg Cabot
- "All-American Girl" (song), a song by Carrie Underwood
- "All American Girl", a song by Melissa Etheridge from Yes I Am
- "All American Girl", a song by Train from My Private Nation
- All-American Girl: The Mary Kay Letourneau Story, a 2000 TV film

== See also ==
- American Girl (disambiguation)
