= It's Perfectly Normal =

Book by Robie Harris

It's Perfectly Normal: Changing Bodies, Growing Up, Sex, and Sexual Health
- Author: Robie Harris
- Illustrator: Michael Emberley
- Language: English
- Subject: Human sexuality
- Publisher: Candlewick Press
- Publication date: 1994, 2004, 2009, 2014, 2021
- Publication place: United States
- Pages: 89
- ISBN: 978-1-56402-159-5

It's Perfectly Normal: Changing Bodies, Growing Up, Sex, and Sexual Health is a children's book written by Robie Harris and illustrated by Michael Emberley. The purpose of the book is to inform preadolescent children about puberty by exploring different definitions of sex. It was first published in 1994 by Candlewick Press and has since been updated several times with new information. It's also been published under the title Let's Talk About Sex in the UK. Harris was prompted to write It's Perfectly Normal by her editor so young individuals would understand aspects of sexual health. The book has won multiple accolades and appraisal for its accurate information and its normalization of body changes and human sexuality. However, it has also been a source of controversy because of its graphic images that some consider inappropriate for the targeted age range. Many of Harris' books, including It's Perfectly Normal, have appeared on the American Library Association's Most Challenged Books list frequently since 2005. It's Perfectly Normal has additional anniversary editions that were published in 2004, 2009, and 2014, with another newly-revised edition being published in 2021. The book has also been translated in 27 languages.

== Background ==
Although Robie H. Harris never intended to become a children's book author, Harris has always been writing books and working with children. She became an elementary school teacher at the Bank Street School for Children in New York City, where she taught children how to write. Later, she started to work at Bank Street Writer's Laboratory with two other children's book authors, Irma Black and Bill Hooks. Harris has said that her mother's work in a biological laboratory may have influenced her to write books about "early childhood development, gender, puberty, reproduction, cells, genetics, viruses, nutrition, health, and sexual health".

In an interview with Booklist, Harris said that an editor at St. Martin's Press proposed the idea of writing a children's book about HIV/AIDS. Harris agreed to the idea, but believed that children needed to learn more about healthy sexuality than just HIV/AIDS, leading to the development of It's Perfectly Normal.

== Publication ==
First published in 1994, It's Perfectly Normal has constantly been updated for the three anniversary editions in 2004, 2009, and 2014. According to Dell'Antonia of The New York Times, Harris, with the purpose of teaching young individuals accurate and resourceful information about sex, had consistently included details of sexual intercourse and the events leading to pregnancy as well as the aftermaths of birth in each edition.

BEE Production Inc. copyrighted the texts and illustrations of 1994, 2004, 2009, and 2014 editions. It's Perfectly Normal is in hardback, paperback, and electronic editions. The book was also translated into 27 different languages.

== Summary ==
It's Perfectly Normal is divided into six parts with individual chapters. The book starts with an introduction that shows two characters – the curious bird and the disgusted bee – that act as the hosts of the book. These two characters are meant to provide humor with their silly actions and comments as well as to reflect the many different feelings children often have about sex.

In Part One, "What Is Sex", Harris introduces sex with different definitions; she writes that sex is a part of gender, sexual reproduction, sexual desire, sexual intercourse, and sexual orientation.

In Part Two, "Our Bodies", she further explains that there are different types of bodies in respect to size, shape, and shade between females and males. Harris also includes thorough information of female and male internal and external reproductive organs. Additionally, Harris explains that everybody talks about sex and body parts with different reactions; some people are uncomfortable and some individuals make jokes about it.

In Part Three, "Puberty", Harris touches on the transition of female and male bodies and feelings during puberty. Harris explains the purpose of puberty as well as sharing information of what to expect and how to take care of the body. In this part, she introduces masturbation as a result from sex hormones.

In Part Four, "Families and Babies", gives a detailed explanation that there are different types of families and that having a baby is a huge responsibility. Harris shares how a baby is conceived by explaining genes and chromosomes. Then, she further explains the aspects of pregnancy, which includes the development of the baby as well as birth. In this section, there is an explanation that there is more to sexual intercourse like kissing, hugging, and holding hands.

In Part Five, "Decisions", it focuses on the choices of delaying sex, abstinence, birth control, and abortion. In this section, the current laws of abortion in the United States are explained as well as who can and cannot have one.

In Part Six, "Staying Healthy", Harris ends the book by discussing online safety, sexual abuse, sexually transmitted infectionsーsuch as HIV/AIDSーand making healthy choices.

In the 2014 anniversary edition, Harris introduces new topics like sexual identity by sharing homosexuality and heterosexuality. She expands her discussion with new terms that describe the LGBT community such as transgender, queer, and questioning. Harris also touches on online safety by opening discussion of sexting and online bullying.

== Genre and style ==
It's Perfectly Normal can be classified as a health manual for upper-elementary and middle school audiences. According to the Booklist, Harris and Emberley associated a clear and accurate illustration with every description. However, the illustrations were also designed to be humorous so the book could be suitable for children. For example, in the panels that show female fertilization eggs traveling through the fallopian tubes into the uterus, Harris shows the eggs screaming in joy as they travel. Harris and Emberley worked closely together on books specifically on sexual health because of the sensitivity of the topic, to ensure that each drawing would be clear and well-made.

The Horn Book Magazine states that the illustrations are done in a friendly style. Whether the person drawn is kissing or is participating in sexual intercourse, they are shown with a happy expression. On the other hand, this is one of the reasons why the book is constantly involved with controversy.

== Reception ==
=== Praise ===
It's Perfectly Normal has received many positive comments from various sources. The book has been praised for its frequently updated information. Robie Harris and Micheal Emberley constantly visit parents, teachers, librarians, doctors, nurses, psychologists, psychoanalysts, scientists and clergy for every new edition of the book published. Specifically, Harris makes sure that new details of AIDS prevention, birth control laws, gender, and sexual abuse are presented accurately in the book. Harris also mentioned that she talks with these specialists of what should be healthy and age appropriate for these children to stay informed and make healthy choices; she does this with the text and illustrations. Harris stated that she does this for the safety of adolescent children that want to learn more about their changing bodies and feelings. Although the internet is available for searching these topics, she says that there are many creepy and dangerous websites that are unfortunately accessible.

Not only was the book praised for its reliability, but it was also commended for bringing awareness to children of puberty. According to Kirkus Reviews, it is a source of education that is slowing the spread of sexual diseases and ignorance. Other reviews said that the book is a useful resource that shares accurate information with a positive message about body changes and human sexuality.

=== Criticism ===
It's Perfectly Normal has also been a source of controversy. Many sources believe that the book portrays sexual content that is not age appropriate, including illustrations of nudity and sex, homosexuality, abortion, and religious viewpoints. According to the American Library Association, It's Perfectly Normal has been one of the most frequently challenged books of the past two decades.

The book has been challenged and, in some cases, removed from public libraries because of its content. For example, it was removed from school district library shelves in Clover Park, Washington, and in Charlestown, Pennsylvania, at the Chester County Public Library. Many critics have called the book "child pornography".

Most of the parents who challenged the book disagreed with the concept of the book because they thought sexual education was not age appropriate for their children. Many of them also believe that children should not encounter texts or illustrations of specific body parts, sexual identity, and sexual well-being yet, especially if their children are not supervised.

=== Awards ===
It's Perfectly Normal won the following awards:

- American Literature Association Notable Children's Book in 1995
- Booklist Editor's Choice in 1994
- Boston Globe–Horn Book Honor Book in 1995
- The New York Times Best Book of the Year in 1995
- School Library Journal Best Books in 1994
- Wilson Library Bulletin Favorite Reads in 1994

== See also ==
- It's So Amazing – 1999 children's book by Robie Harris
