= It's So Amazing! =

1999 children's book by Robie Harris

- First edition cover
- Author: Robie Harris
- Illustrator: Michael Emberley
- Language: English
- Subject: Human sexuality
- Publisher: Candlewick Press
- Publication date: November 1, 1999
- Publication place: United States
- Media type: Print
- Pages: 81
- ISBN: 978-0-7636-0051-8
- OCLC: 40433137
- Dewey Decimal: 612.6
- LC Class: QP251.5 .H37 1999
- Preceded by: It's Perfectly Normal

It's So Amazing! A Book about Eggs, Sperm, Birth, Babies, and Families is a 1999 children's book about pregnancy and childbirth. It is written by Robie Harris and illustrated by Michael Emberley.

== Content ==
The book is intended for tweens, a slightly older demographic than Harris' previous books on sex education, It's Not the Stork and It's Perfectly Normal. It deals with topics related to sexual reproduction, human sexuality, relationships, sexually transmitted infection, and safe sex practices. Educational cartoon illustrations provide visuals of processes such as fetal development. The information is presented alongside the commentary of two characters, a curious bird and a bee who finds the topic embarrassing, acting as emotional stand ins for the readers.

== Publication history ==
An updated edition of the book which included information about internet safety was published in 2014, alongside an expanded edition of It's Perfectly Normal.

== Reception ==
The book received praise for its informative content, age appropriate humor and approachable writing style. Publishers Weekly praised the book's "informal yet informed perspective" and usefulness as an educational resource. K. J. Dell'Antonia of The New York Times praised its illustrations, particularly a "glorious, life-sized image of the fetus in the womb." Kirkus Reviews wrote that it "expertly walk the line between frankness and bluntness, keeping the actual sex act under the covers, and nimbly explaining how abuse differs from normal human contact and affection." Common Sense Media awarded the book four out of five stars.

Both Kailen Stover of Scary Mommy and Carrie R. Wheadon of Common Sense Media recommended the book as a way for parents to open up a dialogue about sex and their personal values.

It received an award for Notable Children's Books from the American Library Association (ALA) in 2000. The book has subsequently been included in several publications' lists of the best books for teaching sex education, including New York Times, Bustle, Scary Mommy, She Knows, and Redbook.

The book was frequently challenged by groups who objected to the inclusion of information about sexuality in children's books, including homosexuality, abortion and masturbation. However, it was subject to less controversy than It's Perfectly Normal. It appeared as #37 in the ALA's list of Most Banned Books during the 2000–2009 decade. In 2014, a petition for the National Library Board (NLB) to reinstate the book and others which had been removed received 3,800 signatures. After The Straits Times reported that these books were removed because of customer feedback, the NLB stated that they had actually been removed because of an internal review. It appeared on Salon.com's 2014 list of the most controversial sex ed books of all time.
