= Homeaid =

American nonprofit organization

HomeAid is a nonprofit organization that provides housing for the homeless. It builds multi-unit developments for homeless families and individuals. After a project is built, HomeAid donates it to a charity to continue operating it. The residents typically stay in these developments for six months to two years.

HomeAid was founded in 1989 by the Orange County chapter of the Building Industry Association of Southern California. It has 19 chapters in 13 states, and it has three regional offices.

Its main source of funding is through the building industry and building industry related companies.
