= Bitty Baby =

Line of American Girl dolls

- Type: Doll
- Company: Pleasant Company; Mattel
- Country: United States
- Availability: 1990–present
- Official website

Bitty Baby is an American Girl line of 15" infant baby dolls for children ages 3 and up. Bitty Baby's arms, legs, and head are made from vinyl.

A precursor to the line called Our New Baby was first released in 1990, which consisted of Caucasian (with blond hair), African-American, and Asian-American variants. The dolls were marketed as a way to get children to adjust to having a young baby in the house. The dolls were gender neutral, unlike the later Bitty Baby; it was expected that the doll could be a younger boy or girl.

Bitty Baby dolls at 15 inches (38 cm) are shorter than the normal American Girl dolls which are 18 inches (46 cm) tall.

== Collections ==
Bitty Baby portrays infants with different skin tone colors and eyes. They have a wide range of accessories such as Pink Paisley Sleeper, Bitty Bear, Backpack, Tee, Bloomers, Dress, Bib, Hat and Shoes, Bottle, Blanket and Memory Book.

The line saw another revamp in 2013, removing Bitty Bear from the package and replacing it with a plush "Wishing Star." Full picture books, written by Kirby Larson and illustrated by Sue Cornelison, were also released.

== Bitty Twins ==
The Bitty Twins were a related line of dolls similar to the Bitty Babies. Originally released in 2003 as slightly older twins, the line was revamped in 2006, aging the dolls as preschoolers along with a redesigned collection. The Bitty Twins were discontinued in 2016 and replaced with WellieWishers, a line of 14.5" dolls marketed towards five to seven year old children.
