= The Shops at Park Lane =

Shopping center in Dallas, Texas

Coordinates: 32.869°N 96.769°W

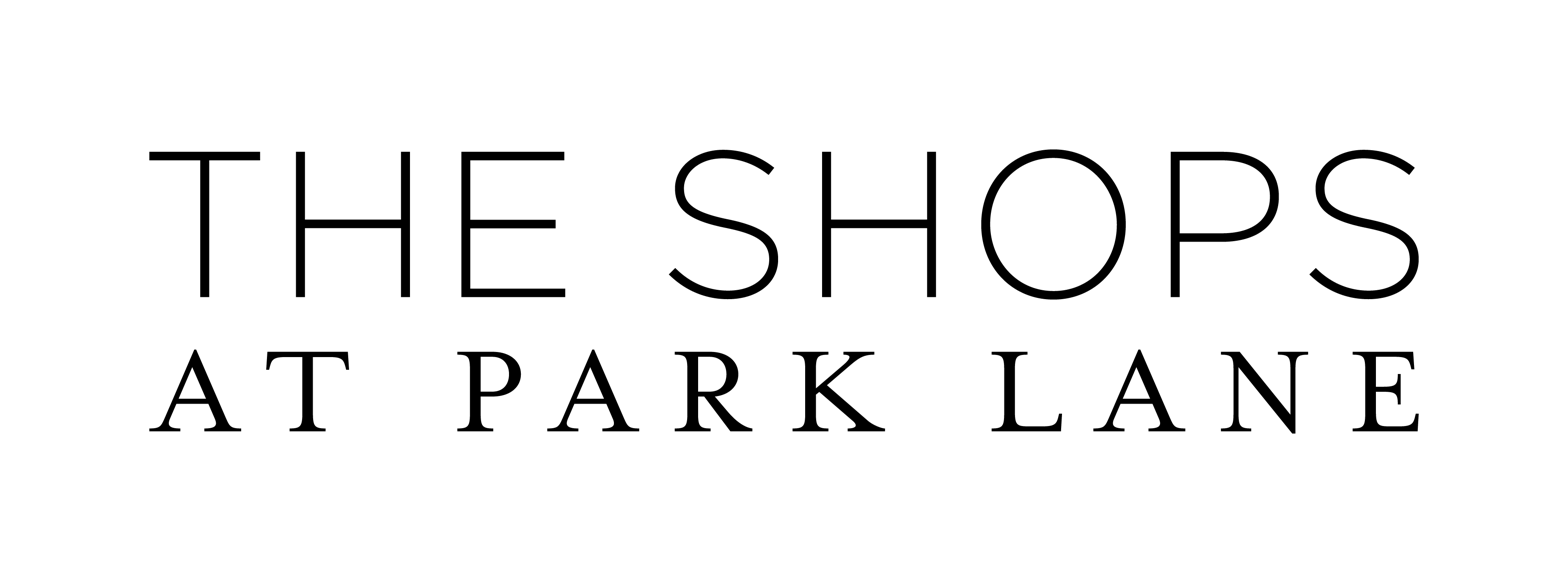
The Shops at Park Lane Logo

The Shops at Park Lane is an upscale shopping center in Dallas, Texas, United States, just across from NorthPark Center. It is the shopping part of the Park Lane Development located at 8080 Park Lane, which includes The Heights, an apartment complex, and a set of office buildings. This mixed-use development was designed by TBG Partners, a landscape architecture firm in Austin, Texas, and developed by developer Harvest Partners of Dallas.

The Shops at Park Lane opened in 2009 as Park Lane with anchor stores including Dick's Sporting Goods and the third Nordstrom Rack in the state. Whole Foods Market also opened a flagship store at Park Lane. Saks Fifth Avenue opened an Off Fifth outlet store soon afterward. Also part of the center are residences and 350,000 square feet of office space. Other early tenants included Lane Bryant and The Children's Place. Overall, the retail center includes 750,000 square feet of retail space.

In 2010, the center was renamed from Park Lane as it added Old Navy and Ulta. Later that year, Northwood Investors of New York City acquired the property, though the original developers retained a financial stake and continue to operate the project.

In 2014, it was announced that the center added a pilates studio, Studio 6 Fitness and will add Bar Louie and Zyn22 Spin Studio before the end of the year. The announcement also shared additions for 2015, including a 2,500 square foot flagship Starbucks as well as Zoe's Kitchen, a boutique pet store called Unleashed by Petco and a men's big and tall clothing store called DXL. Finally, the Shops at Park Lane was completed in 2015.

== Sustainability ==
The Shops at Park Lane shows a sustainable design. The extensive green roof has 23 different plant species, 4 of which are native Texan plants. It also has 5 water fountains across the development along with stone and concrete pavement to lower the Texan summer heat. Also, it has an extensive bosque of trees, providing 24% of shade in areas with no roof.
