= Robie Harris =

American writer (1940–2024)

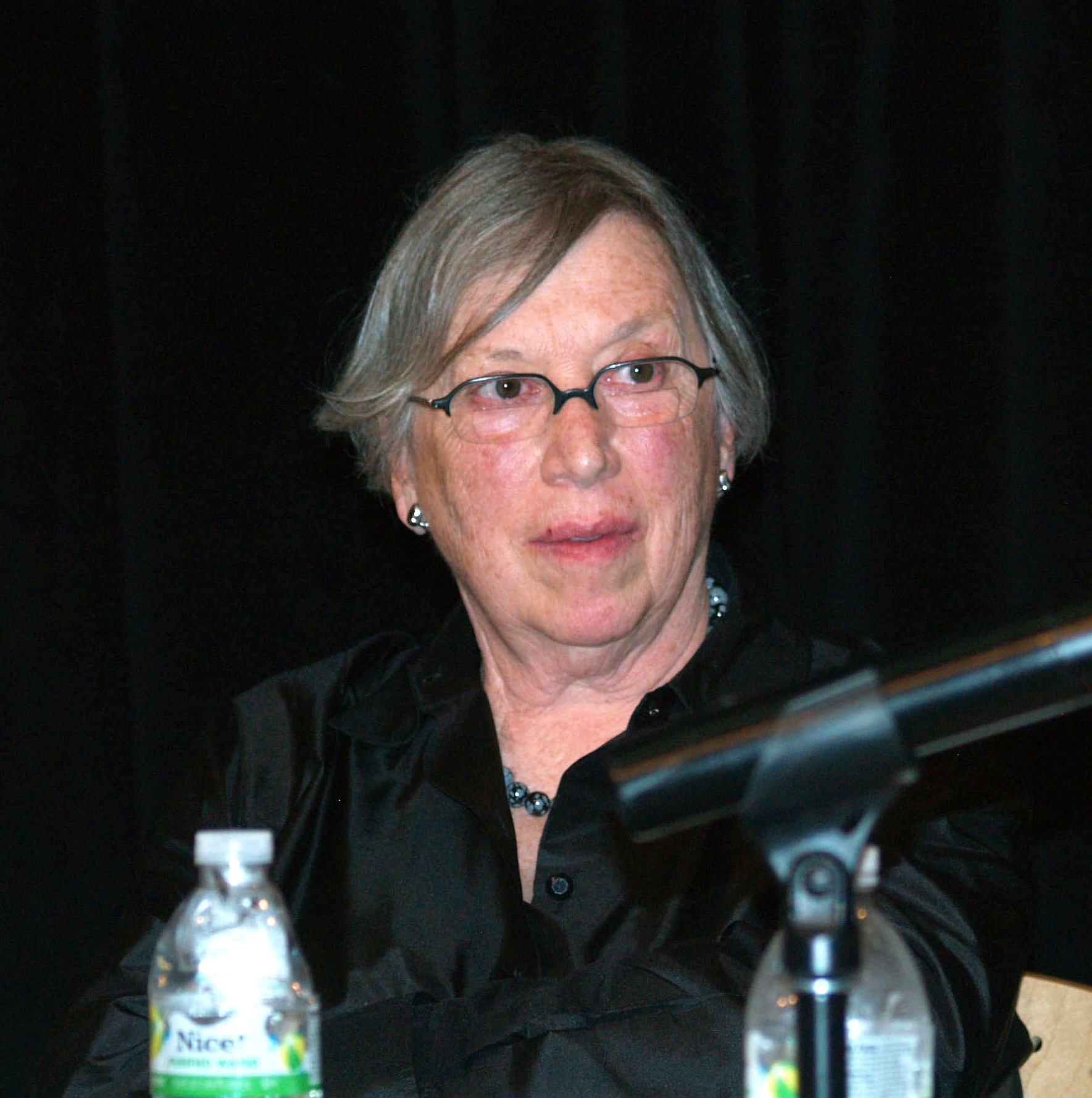
- Harris at the 2014 Brooklyn Book Festival
- Born: Robie Heilbrun; April 3, 1940; Buffalo, New York, U.S.
- Died: January 6, 2024 (aged 83); New York City, U.S.
- Occupation: Children's book author
- Relatives: Elizabeth Levy (cousin)
- Writing career
- Notable works: It's Perfectly Normal; It's so Amazing

Robie H. Harris (born Roberta Heilbrun; April 3, 1940 – January 6, 2024) was an American author. She wrote more than 30 children's books, including the frequently challenged It's Perfectly Normal (1994) and It's So Amazing (1999).

== Early life and education ==
Roberta Heilbrun was born in Buffalo, New York on April 3, 1940. At age three, she announced that she wanted to be called Robie. Her mother worked in a biology laboratory, while her father was a radiologist. She grew up attending a Reform synagogue in Buffalo. She became interested in writing at a young age, and began writing stories in kindergarten. In high school, she was an editor of her school's newspaper. She graduated from Wheaton College, where she served as editor of the school's yearbook, with a bachelor's degree in English in 1962. She went on to graduate from the Bank Street College of Education with a master's in teaching in 1966.

== Career ==
After earning her teaching degree in 1966, Harris became an English elementary school teacher at the Bank Street School for Children. While working with children at the school's after-school Head Start program, she headed a project allowing the students to film the Hell's Kitchen neighborhood through their eyes. With the help of filmmaker Philip Courter, the students' footage was compiled into a film, Child's Eye View. In 1968, the film was screened at the Lincoln Center Film Festival.

Harris collaborated with multiple writers through the Bank Street Writers' Laboratory, of which she was a member.

In 1977, Harris released her first book, Before You Were Three: How You Began to Walk, Talk, Explore, and Have Feelings, which she co-wrote with her friend and cousin Elizabeth Levy. The book was inspired by the birth of her first child, and her nieces' and nephews' reaction to him.

Harris wrote several children's books about childbirth and human sexuality, including It's Perfectly Normal and It's So Amazing, two of the American Library Association's most-challenged books of the 21st century. Harris continued to update the two books, as well as the third in the trio, It's NOT the Stork!, up until her death.

Harris was a board member of the National Coalition Against Censorship for 20 years.

== Awards ==
She won the 2019 Mathical Book Prize for her book Crash! Boom! A Math Tale.

In 2020, Harris received the inaugural Mills Tannenbaum Award for Children's Literacy from Reach Out and Read of Greater New York.

== Personal life ==
Harris lived in New York City beginning in the 1960s, and was roommates with her cousin, novelist Elizabeth Levy, beginning in 1964.

She married William W. Harris, whom she met during an interview on her Child's Eye View film project. The couple had two sons.

She died in a hospital in Manhattan, on January 6, 2024, at the age of 83.

== Publications ==
- Harris, Robie; Levy, Elizabeth (1977). Before You Were Three: How You Began to Walk, Talk, Explore, and Have Feelings. Delacorte.
- Harris, Robie (1978). Don't Forget to Come Back!. Knopf. ISBN 978-0-7636-1782-0.
- Harris, Robie (1981). I Hate Kisses. Knopf.
- Harris, Robie (1994). It's Perfectly Normal: Changing Bodies, Growing Up, and Sexual Health. Candlewick.
- Harris, Robie H.; Emberley, Michael (1996). Happy Birth Day!. Candlewick Press. ISBN 978-0-7636-0974-0.
- Harris, Robie (1999). It's So Amazing!: A Book About Eggs, Sperm, Brith, Babies, and Families. Candlewick.
- Harris, Robie H. (2004). Goodbye Mousie. Turtleback. ISBN 978-1-4177-4039-0.
- Harris, Robie H. (2005). I'm So Mad!. Little, Brown. ISBN 978-0-316-10939-0.
- Harris, Robie H. (2005). I Love Messes!. Little, Brown. ISBN 978-0-316-10946-8.
- Harris, Robie (2006). It's NOT the Stork!: A Book About Girls, Boys, Babies, Bodies, Families, and Friends. Candlewick.
- Harris, Robie (2011). Turtle and Me. little bee books. ISBN 978-1-4998-0046-3.
- Harris, Robie H. (September 13, 2011). Who Has What?: All About Girls' Bodies and Boys' Bodies. Candlewick Press. ISBN 978-0-7636-2931-1.
- Harris, Robie H. (September 11, 2012). Who's in My Family?: All About Our Families. Candlewick Press. ISBN 978-0-7636-3631-9.
- Harris, Robie H. (September 24, 2013). What's in There?: All About You Before You Were Born. Candlewick Press. ISBN 978-0-7636-3630-2.
- Harris, Robie (September 23, 2014). What's So Yummy?: All About Eating Well and Feeling Good. Candlewick Press. ISBN 978-0-7636-3632-6.
- Harris, Robie H. (2016). Who We Are!: All About Being the Same and Being Different. Walker Books and Subsidiaries. ISBN 978-1-4063-6739-3.
- Harris, Robie H. (May 8, 2018). CRASH! BOOM! A Math Tale. Candlewick Press. ISBN 978-0-7636-7827-2.
- Harris, Robie H. (June 5, 2018). Who?: A Celebration of Babies. Abrams. ISBN 978-1-68335-270-9.
- Harris, Robie H. (August 27, 2019). Look!: Babies Head to Toe. Abrams. ISBN 978-1-68335-355-3.
