= American Woman (disambiguation) =

"American Woman" is a 1970 rock song by The Guess Who.

American Woman may also refer to:

- American Woman (2019 film), American drama film directed by Semi Chellas and starring Hong Chau and Sarah Gadon
- American Woman (2018 film), American drama film starring Sienna Miller, Aaron Paul and Christina Hendricks
- American Woman (novel), 2003 novel by Susan Choi
- American Woman (TV series), 2018 television series
- American Woman (album), 1970 album by The Guess Who, containing the song
- American Women quarters, 2022–2025
- American Woman (book), a 2024 non-fiction book about American first ladies

== See also ==
- Women in the Americas
- Women in the United States
