= Dolls of Our Lives =

Pop culture podcast

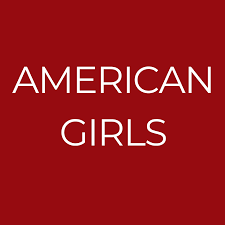
- Genre: History and pop culture

Cast and voices
- Hosted by: Allison Horrocks & Mary Mahoney

Publication
- Original release: 2019

Related
- Website: www.americangirlspod.com

Dolls of Our Lives (formerly American Girls Podcast) is a podcast hosted by Allison Horrocks and Mary Mahoney in which the hosts revisit the American Girl book series they loved as children.

== Overview ==
In each episode, Horrocks and Mahoney discuss one book from the series, contextualizing the story presented and drawing connections with elements of pop culture, including Fyre Festival, Britney Spears, and The Bachelor. They are proceeding through the series chronologically in history, starting with Felicity Merriman, a character set in the American Revolution.

== Inspiration ==
Horrocks and Mahoney were inspired to start the American Girls podcast while studying for their Ph.Ds in history at the University of Connecticut, where they became friends and bonded over their mutual love for the American Girl series. They met many other women who had been inspired by the books, and the podcast launched in February 2019. Horrocks, a park ranger at Lowell National Historical Park in Lowell, Massachusetts, and Mahoney, Mellon Post-Doctoral Fellow in Digital Humanities at Trinity College in Hartford, Connecticut, produce episodes twice a month.

== Reception ==
The podcast has received positive attention from publications like The New York Times, the Los Angeles Review of Books' Podcast Review, A.V. Club, Marie Claire, Book Riot, and the Paris Review. The podcast has been lauded by Book Riot for its thorough analysis, by the Paris Review for its combination of pop culture and historical commentary, and by the Los Angeles Review of Books' Podcast Review for "modelling the type of friendship listeners value, hope for, and vicariously participate in." Margaret Lyons writes for the New York Times that Horrocks and Mahoney are "funny and knowledgeable" and address expansive topics: "The hosts toss off St. Augustine quotes, but also deeply engage with 'The Bachelorette,' wonder whether Ben Franklin’s propagandist side would have flourished in a Fyre Festival context and discuss the history of neurasthenia when Felicity’s mother falls ill with an unnamed disease."

A book by the hosts Dolls of Our Lives: Why We Can't Quit American Girl was announced in April 2023. The book is being published by Macmillan Publishing and will release November 7, 2023.
