= Delivering Good =

American nonprofit organization

- Merged into: Kids in Distressed Situations (K.I.D.S) and Fashion Delivers
- Formation: 1985; 41 years ago
- Type: Nonprofit
- Legal status: Charitable organization
- Purpose: Providing new products to families and individuals in need
- Location: New York City, United States
- Region served: United States
- Services: Distribution to families and individuals in need
- Chief Executive Officer: Andrea Weiss
- Website: delivering-good.org

Delivering Good (formerly K.I.D.S./Fashion Delivers) is an American nonprofit organization that works directly with a network of retailers, manufacturers, and licensors in various industries to provide donations of product to persons in need.

The donation efforts are often focused on families dealing with illness, poverty, or victims of natural disasters.

== History ==
The organization was original founded in 1985 as Kids in Distressed Situations (K.I.D.S.).

In April 2011, K.I.D.S. was featured in the Wall Street Journal's Donor of the Day section.

In April 2014 K.I.D.S merged with another charity Fashion Delivers to create K.I.D.S./Fashion Delivers. The charity received no government support and by 2009 was among the 200 largest charities in the United States.

In 2017 the charity rebranded and changed its name to Delivering Good.
