= Ben Pickering =

British filmmaker (born 1979)

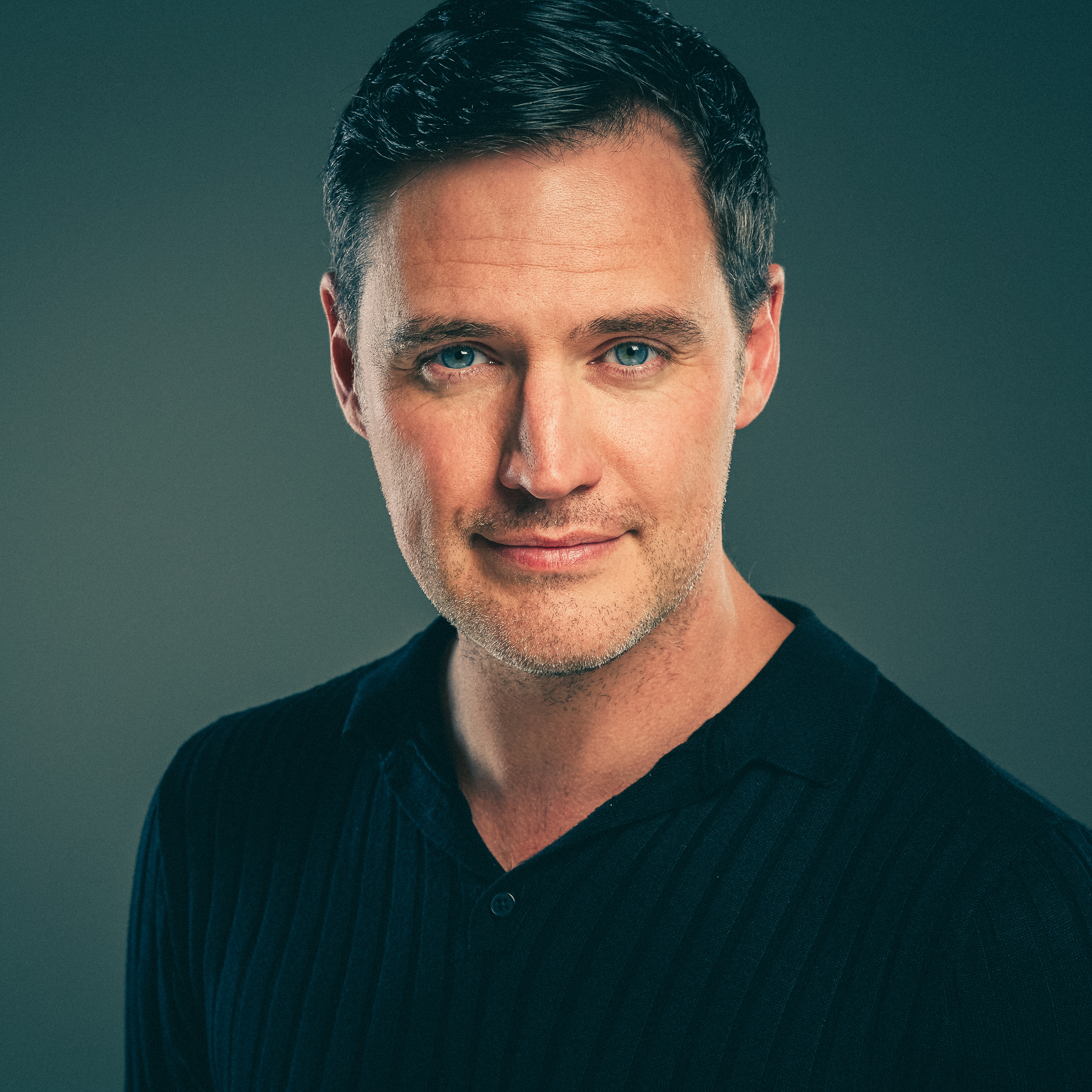
- Born: 23 June 1979 (age 47); Beckenham, London, England
- Education: Swansea University
- Occupations: Film director, producer, writer, novelist
- Years active: 1995–present

Ben Pickering (born 23 June 1979) is a London-born filmmaker and novelist. He is best known for directing the crime thrillers Two Days in the Smoke and Welcome to Curiosity, producing the award-winning Election Night and Give Them Wings and for his dystopian alternative history novel Freiheit.

== Childhood ==
Born in Beckenham in the London Borough of Bromley to Welsh parents, Pickering returned to live in Wales’ second city Swansea when he was one. He grew up in the city, studying at the now defunct Dumbarton House School (whose alumni include Catherine Zeta-Jones) and Ffynone House School before studying Politics at Swansea University.

== Early film career ==
Pickering's first foray into film-making came in 1995 when aged just 16 he produced and starred in his first feature film, the coming-of-age drama Backstreet. Two years later he produced and starred in the no-budget gangster thriller Tragic Irony. Shot on 16mm film with a minuscule £6,000 ($7,500) budget, it was described as a cross between Pulp Fiction and Shallow Grave, taking a swipe at a decadent Nineties Britain.

== Politics and academia ==
After making his directorial debut in 1999 with the pilot episode for docudrama series How To Get Away With Murder, Pickering's film career took a back seat as he got heavily involved in UK politics.

While studying at Swansea University, he joined the Conservative Party. He rose quickly through its ranks to be selected in May 2000 as its candidate for the Labour-held Swansea West parliamentary constituency for the 2001 UK General Election.

A socially liberal, economically conservative politician, Pickering was a very different kind of Conservative candidate to those that had gone before. Afraid that he might win the seat, the Swansea Labour Party co-ordinated with the South Wales Evening Post to make allegations of financial impropriety against Pickering during televised First Minister's Questions in the National Assembly for Wales (or Senedd) on 14 June 2000. As then First Minister Rhodri Morgan made the unsubstantiated allegations in the Senedd, he was protected by parliamentary privilege and Pickering could not sue for libel. When Morgan refused to repeat the allegations outside of the Senedd, senior Conservatives (including Lord Bourne of Aberystwyth, their former Welsh leader and a supporter of Pickering) forced him to stand aside while South Wales Police investigated the allegations. In September 2000, South Wales Police announced that Pickering had no case to answer and ended their investigation.

Despite being cleared of any wrongdoing, after the allegations were repackaged by the BBC Wales political programme Dragon's Eye in April 2001, Pickering's frontline political career never recovered.

He continued to work with centre-right think tanks while embarking on a PhD, before finally leaving the Conservative Party in 2006. He is no longer politically affiliated or active.

== Imprisonment ==
On 27 July 2011, Pickering was arrested by officers from South Wales Police's Economic Crime Unit as part of Operation Azure, a long-running investigation into historical mortgage fraud perpetrated by Swansea-based mortgage broker Paul John, a former employee of mortgage brokerage John Dyer and Sons.

The allegations against Pickering, by then 32 but which dated back to 2002 (when he was 23), involved the use of proof of income (P60s and payslips) for mortgage applications. The documents incorrectly showed he had paid tens of thousands of pounds in UK income tax and National Insurance contributions. As he hadn't subsequently paid the taxes in full, all mortgages that he had applied for during his time as a property developer were declared retrospectively fraudulent. In June 2014 he pleaded guilty to five counts of mortgage fraud at Swansea Crown Court.

Operation Azure ran for over six years (from October 2008 to the sentencing of Pickering and others on 18 December 2014). Twenty-one people – including Pickering, John, Pickering's former business partner Mark Cainen and others involved in property dealings with them – were arrested or interviewed under police caution between July 2011 and October 2013.

Three – Pickering, John and Cainen's ex-girlfriend Emma Davey – pleaded guilty to mortgage fraud at Swansea Crown Court on 13 June 2014. Three other defendants were found not guilty at a trial at Swansea Crown Court in October 2014. The same trial found Cainen guilty and on 18 December 2014, His Honour Judge Keith Thomas sentenced him to 8 years’ imprisonment, Pickering to 6 and John to 3 years 4 months. Davey was given a suspended prison sentence.

Pickering was released from open prison in December 2017 having served half of his 6-year prison sentence.

== Post-release career ==
In 2007 Pickering produced his first film in ten years, the quirky and surreal short film Beached. Made for £25,000 ($30,000) in conjunction with graduates of the London Film School, it featured Welsh rugby legend Ray Gravell in his final screen role. Beached was selected for the 2009 Strasbourg International Film Festival and also screened at the Short Film Corner in Cannes the same year.

In 2012, he directed his first feature film The Smoke (original title Two Days in the Smoke). The £500,000 ($650,000) budget film, which was a remake of his earlier film Tragic Irony (which he had produced and starred in), starred starring Matt Di Angelo, Lili Bordán, Stephen Marcus, B*Witched singer Lindsay Armaou, Anna Passey and Alan Ford.

The Smoke was released in the UK and Ireland in October 2014 and internationally in 2015 (as London Payback). One of the film's stars, Jeff Leach, told reporters that many scenes featuring his character Dean ended up on the cutting room floor. IMDB refers to the release as the "studio cut" not the Director's Cut of the film, which reportedly has 12 minutes of additional unseen footage. Footage not seen in the released version of the film involving Leach as well as Passey and Christian Brassington can be seen in an earlier trailer.

Further producing duties followed The Smoke – Ratted Out, The Stranger and the unfinished Party Pieces – before Pickering returned to the director's chair a second time for the Cornwall-set psychological thriller Welcome to Curiosity (shooting title: Curiosity Kills). The film was shot on location in Cornwall, Kent and London between April and October 2014 and starred Amrita Acharia, Richard Blackwood and Stephen Marcus. It is the world's first fully crowd-investor funded film, having raised all of its £200,000 ($240,000) budget from crowd investment platform Seedrs.

After its premiere in London's Leicester Square, Pickering's second feature Welcome to Curiosity was released in UK and North American cinemas, on DVD and VOD in June 2018.

In March 2019, it was announced that he was producing the political thriller Election Night. Directed by Neil Monaghan, a former PR advisor to ex-Labour Deputy Prime Minister John Prescott, the film was released worldwide in 2022.

Pickering's debut novel Freiheit – a dystopian alternative history thriller based in a post-war Britain where Adolf Hitler had never existed – was published on 2 September 2019, to coincide with the 80th anniversary of the outbreak of World War II.

== Personal life ==
Pickering is divorced with two children.

== Filmography ==
Year	Film	Notes
1995	Backstreet	Producer
1997	Tragic Irony	Producer
2009	Beached	Producer
2014	The Smoke	Director/Producer
2014	The Stranger	Associate Producer
2014	Party Pieces	Line Producer
2016	Ratted Out	Co-Producer
2018	Welcome to Curiosity	Director/Producer
2019	Election Night	Producer
2020	Give Them Wings	Co-Producer
2021	The Presence of Love	Line Producer
2022	Christmas in London	Line Producer

== Bibliography ==
- Freiheit (2019)
