= Lindsay Armaou =

Irish actress and singer

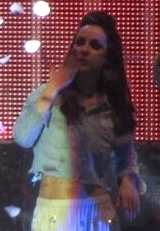
- Armaou with B*Witched in 2013
- Born: Lindsay Gael Christian Elaine Armaou; 18 December 1978 (age 47); Athens, Greece
- Occupations: Singer, actress
- Years active: 1997–2002, 2009–present
- Spouses: Lee Brennan (m. 2006; div. 2011); Indi Pahl (m. 2015)
- Children: 2
- Musical career
- Origin: Ireland
- Genres: Pop
- Member of: B*Witched

Lindsay Armaou (Greek: Λίντσεϊ Αρμάου; born 18 December 1978) is an Irish actress and singer. She is best known as a member of girl group B*Witched and for her roles as Sister Georgina in the crime thriller film The Smoke (2014) and Marlene Flynn in the Netflix drama Stay Close (2021).

== Early life and education ==
Armaou was born on 18 December 1978 in Athens, Greece, to an Irish mother and a Greek father. She plays piano and guitar; she had learned both before she was 13 years old. She also wrote her own music prior to being in B*Witched.

== Career ==
=== 1998–2002: B*Witched and hiatus ===
In 1998, Edele Lynch formed the group Butterfly Farm with her twin sister, Keavy Lynch, and their friend Sinéad O'Carroll. The trio began writing and recording together but soon realised that there was "someone missing". Upon a friend Graham's suggestion, they asked Armaou to come for an audition and she played a tape recording of a song called "United We Stand" that she had written. The other girls liked it and Armaou became the fourth member of the band, who later changed their name to B*Witched. B*Witched enjoyed huge success worldwide, becoming the first act in history to have their first four singles debut at number one on the UK Singles Chart. Their self-titled debut album also topped the UK Albums Chart and peaked at number 9 on the US Billboard Hot 100. B*Witched split up in 2002 and, after, she took a seven-year hiatus.

=== 2009–present: Acting career and B*Witched reunion ===
From 2008 to 2011, Armaou trained as an actress at The Poor School, an acting school in London's King's Cross. She played the parts of Portia in The Merchant of Venice, Isabelle in Ring Round the Moon, Felicity Rumpers in Habeas Corpus, Anya in The Cherry Orchard and the Ghost of Christmas Present in A Christmas Carol. In April 2012, Lindsay was cast in her first feature film role as Sister Georgina in the British indie crime thriller Two Days in the Smoke, alongside Matt Di Angelo, Stephen Marcus and Alan Ford.

On 18 October 2012, it was announced that the original members of B*Witched would reunite for an ITV2 series entitled The Big Reunion along with five other pop groups of their time: 911, Liberty X, Five, Honeyz and Atomic Kitten. The show turned into The Big Reunion series of concerts around the UK and Ireland throughout 2013.

In 2021, Armaou began starring as Marlene Flynn in the Netflix drama Stay Close.

== Personal life ==
Armaou married 911's Lee Brennan in September 2006. They separated in 2011.

In October 2015, she married Indi Pahl, a recruitment director, in a private ceremony. They currently live in Manchester. Armaou gave birth to a daughter in July 2017 and a son in May 2019.

== Filmography ==
=== Film ===
Year	Title	Role	Notes
2013	Threads	Amanda	Short film
2013	Rescue Me	Elena	Short film
2014	The Smoke	Georgina	
2015	Daisy	Sonia	
2015	Camberwell Beauty	Anabel	Short film
2016	Escape to Victory	Lindsay	Short film

=== Television ===
Year	Title	Role	Notes
2013	The Big Reunion	Herself	Season 1
2013	Sooty	Herself	Episode: "Disco Disco!"
2014–2015	Wireless	Rebecca McCarthy	
2021	Stay Close	Marlene Flynn	

== Stage ==
Year	Title	Role
2009	The Merchant of Venice	Portia
2010	Ring Round the Moon	Isabelle
2010	Habeas Corpus	Felicity Rumpers
2010–11	The Cherry Orchard	Anya
2011	A Christmas Carol	Ghost of Christmas Present

== Discography ==
=== Featured singles ===
Title	Year	Album
"Don't Go" (Richard Murray and Paul Deighton featuring Lindsay)	2010	Don't Go
"Remember the Good Times" (Richard Murray and Paul Deighton featuring Lindsay)	2012	non-album single
