= Philip Whitchurch =

English actor (born 1951)

Philip Whitchurch (born 30 January 1951) is an English stage, film, and television actor. He is best known for playing Captain William Frederickson in three episodes of Sharpe between 1994-1997 and the role of Chief Inspector Philip Cato in The Bill from 1993 to 1995. He also played another character, Inspector Twist, on the same show, as well as Tyler in My Hero from 2000 to 2006.

== Roles ==
His other television work includes The Brothers McGregor, Little Sir Nicholas, The Detectives, Peak Practice, Holby City, Bergerac, Boon, Casualty, Monarch of the Glen, Midsomer Murders, G.B.H., Van der Valk, The Young Indiana Jones Chronicles, Waterfront Beat, Dramarama, Wire in the Blood, Foyle's War, Mersey Beat, In Exile, Get Real, Plotlands, A Perfect State, Virtual Murder, El C.I.D. and The Vicar of Dibley.

He also played Derek, the chair of governors, in the first series of Hope and Glory and appeared in the BBC drama New Tricks. He narrated the TV-am children's series The Shoe People, where he also he provided all the voices for the characters. He supplied the voice of Zippi in the CITV animated television series Toucan Tecs. Whitchurch played Billy's dad in Elton John's West End stage adaptation of Billy Elliot from 5 December 2005 until 2 December 2006. He returned to the role from 2 June 2008 until 29 November 2008, and played the role on Broadway from 29 January 2010 until 2 May 2010. In 2008, he in an episode of BBC1's Waking the Dead. In 2012, he appeared alongside Luke Goss in the feature film Interview with a Hitman (2012) written and directed by Perry Bhandal in which he played the British crime boss Tosca. Whitchurch also played a character called "The Geordie", a hoodwinked thug, in the ITV drama Doors Open which was transmitted on Boxing Day 2012.

in 2013, he played the role of Alfred Chalmers in Ian Rankin's debut play Dark Road. In 2016, Whitchurch was cast as the Duke of Gloucester in the Talawa Theatre Company and Royal Exchange Manchester co-production of King Lear. In May 2020, he appeared in an episode of the BBC soap opera Doctors as Peter Wilson.
