= Caroline Tillette =

French-Swiss actress (born 1988)

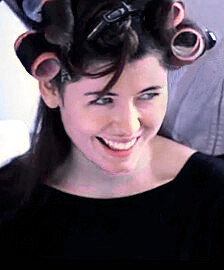
- Tillette in 2012
- Born: 16 July 1988 (age 37); Paris, France
- Occupation: Actress

Caroline Tillette (born 16 July 1988 in Paris) is a French-Swiss actress.

== Career ==
She attended classes at Cours Florent. After several short films, she made an appearance in Plus belle la vie in 2008 playing Pauline, the daughter of a mafia Don. In 2009, she joined LAMDA (the London Academy of Music and Drama) and had a role in Gainsbourg, vie héroïque directed by Joann Sfar. In 2011 she played Albertine Simonet in the television movie À la recherche du temps perdu directed by Nina Companeez.

== Filmography ==
- Projet ODIN by Cedric Peyster
- Carole by Maxime Foulon
- Le Café by Jean-Mathieu Gennisson
- Mon Dieu à moi by Mousavi
- 2008 : Plus belle la vie (TV): Pauline
- 2009 : Gainsbourg, vie héroïque directed by Joann Sfar
- 2011 : À la recherche du temps perdu directed by Nina Companeez: Albertine Simonet
- 2011 : Bienvenue à bord directed by Eric Lavaine: Sonia's secretary Jerome Berthelot
- 2012 : Populaire directed by Régis Roinsard: The vamp
- 2012 : Interview with a Hitman directed by Perry Bhandal: Bethesda
