= Dumbarton House School =

Former independent school in Swansea, UK

Coordinates: 51.6167°N 3.9607°W

Dumbarton House School was a co-educational independent school located in Swansea in South Wales. The school opened in 1923 and closed in 1993. The buildings were demolished to make way for a new block of flats.

== Notable former pupils ==
- Rob Brydon, comedian
- Ben Pickering, filmmaker and novelist
- Catherine Zeta-Jones, actress
