= An American Girl: Grace Stirs Up Success =

- Cover art for the film
- Directed by: Vince Marcello
- Screenplay by: Jessica O'Toole; Amy Rardin
- Based on: Grace by Mary Casanova
- Starring: Olivia Rodrigo; Virginia Madsen; Eloise Webb; Caitlin Carmichael; Notlim Taylor
- Cinematography: Tim Wooster
- Edited by: Paul Millspaugh
- Music by: Patrick Kirst
- Production companies: Universal Studios; Martin Chase Productions; Pinckney Productions
- Distributed by: Universal Pictures Home Entertainment
- Release date: June 9, 2015
- Running time: 101 minutes
- Country: United States
- Language: English

An American Girl: Grace Stirs Up Success is a 2015 family comedy-drama direct-to-video film starring Olivia Rodrigo in the title role. Virginia Madsen, Eloise Webb, Caitlin Carmichael, Notlim Taylor, Lili Bordán, Fabrice Michel, Roxane Bret, Krisztina Peremartoni and András Bálint played supporting roles, with a cameo from restaurateur Joe Bastianich. As with the previous American Girl films, Grace Stirs Up Success was directed by Vince Marcello, with a screenplay by Jessica O'Toole and Amy Rardin.

The film focuses on 2015 Girl of the Year Grace Thomas as she takes an unexpected trip to Paris and finds a way to save her grandparents' ailing bakery by joining in a season of MasterChef Junior.

== Plot ==
In the town of Bentwick, Massachusetts, Grace Thomas develops a passion for baking in her grandparents' bakery. Wanting to save up for a new bike, Grace begins a small cupcake business with her best friends Ella and Maddy, which soon becomes successful. She plans to continue the business during the summer but is asked by her mother to come with her on a trip to Paris, where Grace's aunt Sophie, uncle Bernard, and cousin Sylvie live, as they are expecting a baby soon. That leaves Ella and Maddy to earn money another way, and they start a dog-grooming service called the Paw Spa.

Bernard owns a pâtisserie, which becomes an opportunity for Grace to improve her baking skills. She realizes quickly that it will be a challenge to work for her uncle. At the same time, she struggles to warm to Sylvie, who also works at the pâtisserie but is uncomfortable with the extra company. As Grace's efforts at the pâtisserie get her into trouble, her mother advises her to ask Bernard what he needs help with, rather than do things herself. During their free time, Grace and her mother sightsee around Paris, visiting the Eiffel Tower with Sophie, Bernard and Sylvie. While there, Sophie goes into labor and needs to be driven to a hospital. She gives birth to a girl, naming her Lily. Grace welcomes her new cousin, while Sylvie feels reserved about her new sister.

Lily's crying makes Grace and Sylvie restless, but it gives the two time to bond. They also help land an important client for the pâtisserie—Jean-Luc Pernaud, the owner of a hotel Bernard has been seeking to do business with. While they use a local dog, whom Grace befriends and calls Bonbon, to deliver samples from the pâtisserie, Pernaud is impressed and asks Bernard to fulfill an order for the Bastille Day celebration. In preparing the treats, Bernard is concerned that the recipes are not up to the high standard needed for the occasion. As Grace has always gone strictly by the wording in recipes and has no idea how to improve the quality, her uncle uses the phrase je ne sais quoi to describe the unique ingredients that make a recipe stand out, and Grace sees its importance. Bastille Day becomes a success for the pâtisserie, despite worries from both Grace and her uncle. As Grace's trip in Paris comes to an end, Bernard tells her that she will keep learning the je ne sais quoi, as it differs for every recipe.

When Grace returns home, she shares her experiences in Paris with Ella and Maddy, including what she learned from her uncle, but she gets upset when they discuss the Paw Spa. Later, Grace is devastated to hear that her grandparents' bakery is going to shut down, due to a lack of customers. She comes up with a plan to save the bakery and asks Ella and Maddy to help, after apologizing over how she talked to them earlier. Her grandparents are delighted when business picks up, but then the oven fails, setting them back.

Grace gets a huge break when she is selected to be a contestant on MasterChef Junior Baking Edition, unaware that her grandmother submitted an application on her behalf. The prize for winning is $100,000, enough to save the bakery. Despite gamesmanship from one of her competitors, requiring her to improvise her signature dessert, Grace makes it into the finals of the competition. Reminded about the je ne sais quoi lesson from her uncle in developing her next dessert, Grace impresses the judges again and wins.

Bernard, Sophie, Sylvie and Lily fly to Bentwick to congratulate Grace, surprising her even more when Bonbon appears. The community, having watched Grace on Masterchef Junior, comes to support the bakery, with Bernard giving business a boost for the celebration.

== Cast ==
- Olivia Rodrigo as Grace Thomas, who is nine years old and loves baking.
- Virginia Madsen as Mrs. Karen Thomas, Grace's mother who is an elementary school teacher.
- Eloise Webb as Sylvie, Grace's French cousin.
- Caitlin Carmichael as Maddy, Grace's best friend who loves art.
- Notlim Taylor as Ella, Grace's best friend who is a math whiz.
- Rafael Edholm as Mr. Thomas, Grace's father who is a therapist.
- Krisztina Peremartoni as Grace's grandmother, who co-owns a bakery with her grandfather.
- András Bálint as Grace's grandfather, who co-owns a bakery with her grandmother.
- Fabrice Michel as Bernard, Grace's uncle who owns a pâtisserie in Paris.
- Lili Bordán as Sophie, Grace's maternal aunt who moved to France to study baking and married Bernard.
- Roxane Bret as Colette, Bernard's pastry intern.
- Thierry Harcourt as Jean-Luc Pernaud, owner of a Paris hotel where Bernard seeks to expand his clientele.
- Joe Bastianich as himself, one of the judges on MasterChef Junior Baking Edition.
- Tom Doherty as Josh, Grace's older brother.
- Maxime Leigh-Wood as Carter, one of Grace's competitors on MasterChef Junior Baking Edition.

== Release ==
The direct-to-video film was released on video-on-demand services on June 9, 2015, and was released for DVD and Blu-ray on June 23.

A limited theatrical screening of the film was held at the Backus Community Center in International Falls, Minnesota on June 23, 2015. Similar film-viewing events were also held at all American Girl Place stores.

On June 11, 2016, Disney Channel premiered the film on television, since Olivia Rodrigo concurrently starred in both the Disney Channel series Bizaardvark and in the film. The film also appeared on Netflix, but Rodrigo's credit on the film was misspelled as "Olivo Rodrigo".

== Reception ==
In her review for Common Sense Media, Tracy Moore rated it 4/5 stars and wrote that the film is a "tale of young baker jam-packed with positive messages."
