= Toucan Tecs =

- Created by: Peter Lawson; Elizabeth Laird
- Starring: Peter Hawkins; Kate Lee; Tony Robinson; Philip Whitchurch
- Opening theme: Toucan 'Tecs Theme (Instrumental)
- Country of origin: United Kingdom (England/Wales)
- Original languages: English; Welsh
- No. of seasons: 1
- No. of episodes: 26

Production
- Running time: 10 minutes (per episode)
- Production companies: Cartwn Cymru, Catalyst Pictures

Original release
- Network: ITV (CITV); S4C
- Release: 7 January 1991 – 2 April 1992

Toucan Tecs (Welsh: Slici a Slac) is a British animated children's television programme about two private detectives, a pair of titular anthropomorphic toucan detectives named Zippi and Zac (voiced by Philip Whitchurch and Tony Robinson respectively), who, although based in the jungle, traveling around the world solving crimes on their flying devices. Their main enemies are group of ducks, called "The Mad Ducks", led by Red Leader.

Produced and Animated by Cartwn Cymru, S4C and Yorkshire Television, the show debuted on CITV on 7 January 1991 and consists of 26 ten-minute episodes.

== Characters ==
- Zippi - The brains of the Toucan 'Tecs, who comes up with plans. Wherever he goes around the world, he always wears a matching hat corresponding to the country. He is voiced by Philip Whitchurch.
- Zac - Zippi's partner of the Toucan 'Tecs, who carries out Zippi's plans. He wears blue glasses. He is voiced by Tony Robinson.
- Samson - A snail who provides the equipment that toucans will need to carry out their cases. He wears a fuchsia and aqua polka dot bow tie. He has a Scottish accent and is the Toucan Tecs’ agent. He is voiced by Philip Whitchurch.
- Fifi - A fat duck who provides transport for the toucans. She is voiced by Kate Lee in a German accent.
- The Mad Ducks - The main antagonists who are always up to no good, having fun and playing at others inconvenience and expense. They wear pilot helmets in different colours and goggles. They are voiced by Tony Robinson, Philip Whitchurch and Kate Lee.
  - The Red Leader - The boss of the Mad Ducks. She always gives the word and wears a brown jacket, a pale pink scarf, a red pilot helmet and goggles. She is voiced by Kate Lee.

== Episodes ==
#	Title	Summary	Air Date
1	Gopher Gold	Zippi and Zac are called in to help a Mexican Gopher whose burrow is being destroyed by the Mad Ducks!	21 October 1990
2	Swiss Roll	Shammy the Mountain Goat calls in the toucan detectives to find out why none of the cuckoo clocks work anymore.	22 October 1990
3	Highland Fling	Willy the bat hasn't had a wink of sleep in Invergargle Castle for ages - but why?	23 October 1990
4	High Flyers	Billions the tycoon pigeon needs Zippi and Zac to help him budge the Mad Ducks who have landed on his New York penthouse.	24 October 1990
5	The Peacock Palace Scoop	A magic carpet arrives to whisk the toucans off to the mysterious and fabulous East. But why?	25 October 1990
6	The Big Drip	A family of beavers in Canada are in a lot of trouble when all the water disappears from their dam, Zippi and Zac are called in to help.	26 October 1990
7	Desert Island Ducks	The intrepid toucans find a way to rescue the baby turtles on a beautiful South Seas island.	27 October 1990
8	The Snail's Tale	The story of how the toucan detectives first met Samson the snail and those mad, bad, dangerous Mad Ducks.	28 October 1990
9	Pandamonium	Zippi and Zac are on their way to China to help by the Giant Pandas those Mad Ducks are playing on their playground, but then was spooked by a fire breathing dragon.	29 October 1990
10	Crazy Golf	TBA	1 November 1990
11	Down-Under the Weather	Poor Zippi was having a bad cold when Zac visits Australia with the koala bears, but at the outback the Mad Ducks know their boss Red Leader got a bad cold with they steal some leaves.	2 November 1990
12	Dolly Rockers	Zippi and Zac travels to Siberia Russia to help Boris, but the Mad Ducks steals a bunch of dolls.	3 November 1990
13	The Grand Ostrich Ball	TBA	7 November 1990
14	Arabian Knights	TBA	8 November 1990
15	Mad Ducks Olympics	The Mad Ducks are holding their annual Olympic Games, but there's a lot of cheating going on!	9 November 1990
16	Colour Crazy	TBA	10 November 1990
17	Barmy Barn Dance	TBA	11 November 1990
18	Up in the Air	Zippi and Zac go to the forest in Finland to help the flying squirrels who are frightened by the Mad Ducks with hang gliders.	12 November 1990
19	Soccer it to Them	TBA	13 November 1990
20	Potty Pirates	TBA	14 November 1990
21	The Ice Cream Scream	Tiki the Himalayan snow leopard hears an awful noise - then the snow starts to disappear.	15 November 1990
22	Zac in Love	TBA	20 November 1990
23	Ducks and Dragons	TBA	21 November 1990
24	Magic Tricks	TBA	22 November 1990
25	Prickly Problems	TBA	24 November 1990
26	Raising a Stink	TBA	29 November 1990

== Credits ==
- Developed from Zippi and Zac a series of books by Heinemann Young Books
- Original story by: Peter Lawson and Elizabeth Laird
- Series Consultants: Cartwn Cymru
- Script: Roger Stennett, John Gatehouse
- Voices: Peter Hawkins, Kate Lee, Tony Robinson, Philip Whitchurch
- Storyboard and Layout: Wayne Thomas, Nik Lever
- Backgrounds: Jocelyn Smith, Karen Pereira
- Animation: Paul Bannister, Steve Hayne, Roger Philips, Lloyd Sutton, Graham Griffiths, Chris Webster, Nigel Davies, Andrew Janes, Phil Parker, Theresa Whatley, Andy Wilson, Malcom McGookin, Darren Holt, Denise Heywood, Martin Edwards
- Assistant Animation: Helen Smith, Johnathan Tordoff, Helen Michael, Paul Greenall, Michael Harrison, David Taylor, Craig Whittle, Jonathan Barry
- For the Ink 'n' Paint Co: Elizabeth Butler, Nic Howell, Andrew Peters, Lisa Ann Pike, Marie Sheard, Inez Stoodley, Jenny Thomissen, Rosemary Thorburn, Pauline Webster, Wendy Williams
- Xerox and Tracing: Mark Grindley, Joanna Alvey, Ruth Jacobs, Dona Walsh
- Painting: Colour Crew
- Line Tester: Duncan Harris
- Camera: Cardiff Cartoon Camera Company, Mark Sutton, Steve Charkewycz, Tim Francis
- Sound: Eco Ltd, Ray Buckley, APS, Ian Gillespie, Silk Sound
- Materials: Film Sales, Cromacolour
- Editor: Robert Francis
- Off-Line Editor: Andrew Brearley
- On-Line Editing: Editz
- Music: Ernie Wood
- Production Co-ordinators: Ceri Griffin, Melvin Howcroft
- Directors: Gary Hurst, Nik Lever
- Producers: Naomi Jones, Ian Steel
- Executive Producers: Christopher Grace, John Marsen
- a Cartwn Cymru production for Yorkshire Television in association with S4C
- A Catalyst Pictures Ltd Production in association with Cartoon for Yorkshire Television
- © Yorkshire Television Ltd MCMXC/MCMXCII
