= Welcome to Curiosity =

2018 British crime thriller film

- Directed by: Ben Pickering
- Written by: Darren Ripley
- Produced by: Ben Pickering; Darren Ripley
- Starring: Amrita Acharia; Jack Ashton; Richard Blackwood; Kacey Clarke; Lili Bordán; Stephen Marcus; Finn Corney
- Cinematography: Bruce Melhuish
- Edited by: Ricky Milling
- Music by: Luke Corradine; Stewart Dugdale
- Production company: Shooting Tiger Pictures in association with Taffy Boy Films
- Release dates: 25 May 2018 (North America); 8 June 2018 (UK)
- Running time: 94 minutes
- Country: United Kingdom
- Language: English

Welcome to Curiosity is a 2018 British crime thriller film directed by Ben Pickering and starring Amrita Acharia, Jack Ashton, Richard Blackwood, Kacey Clarke, Lili Bordán, Stephen Marcus and Finn Corney. It is the world's first film to have raised its entire production budget through equity crowdfunding.

== Cast ==
- Amrita Acharia as Zoe/Lee Hunting
- Jack Ashton as Sean
- Richard Blackwood as Fordy
- Kacey Clarke as Martine
- Brian Croucher as Ernest Stubbs
- Gary Grant as Tim
- Cristian Solimeno as Dexter
- Terry Sweeney as Lewis
- Eke Chukwu as Al
- O’Ar Pali as DS Binon
- Darren Ripley as DI Jackson
- Monty Burgess as Topic
- Lara Heller as Duffy
- Finn Corney as Elliott
- Lily Joseph as Holly
- Christopher Rithin as Thomas
- Sofya Skya as Alina
- Lili Bordán as Dr Jones
- Stephen Marcus as Max
- Danny Howard as OZ
- Eloise Dale as Julie
- Nigel Billing as Nigel
- Jon Campling as Sid
- Duncan Casey as Derrick
- Sean Cronin as Nikolai

== Production ==
Principal photography began on 29 April 2014 and concluded on 31 October 2014. Filmed on location in Cornwall, Kent and London. Prominent locations included Goonhilly Satellite Earth Station on Cornwall’s Lizard peninsula, Mimi's Vintage Diner in Bugle and Fort Borstal outside Rochester, Kent.

The film's £200,000 ($240,000) budget was raised in three rounds of equity crowdfunding by producers Ben Pickering and Darren Ripley.
