= À la recherche du temps perdu (film) =

2011 French television film

- Region 2 DVD cover
- Based on: In Search of Lost Time by Marcel Proust
- Written by: Nina Companéez
- Directed by: Nina Companéez
- Theme music composer: Bruno Bontempelli
- Country of origin: France
- Original language: French

Production
- Cinematography: Dominique Brabant
- Editor: Michèle Hollander
- Running time: 113 minutes (part one); 119 minutes (part two)
- Production companies: France Télévision; Arte; Ciné Mag Bodard; Radio Télévision Suisse (RTS); TV5 Monde

Original release
- Release: 9 January 2011

À la recherche du temps perdu is a 2011 television film by Nina Companéez, based on Marcel Proust's 1913–1927 seven-volume novel In Search of Lost Time.

The two-part film attempts to cover the entire novel with the exception of the first volume, Swann's Way—the narrator's childhood and the story of Charles Swann are only briefly mentioned, the latter having already been previously adapted as Swann in Love (1984) by Volker Schlöndorff.

Critical reception was mixed, with e.g. German newspaper Süddeutsche Zeitung questioning the wisdom and feasibility of filming the novel in its entirety at all. The review in Frankfurter Allgemeine Zeitung pointed out the staginess of the adaptation and found Micha Lescot's slightly tongue-in-cheek performance as the narrator somewhat lacking. Der Tagesspiegel on the other hand praised the adaptation, in particular for its visual opulence and Micha Lescot's acting. Le Figaro also lauded the telefilm both for its screenplay—which it considered accessible in style yet true to the tone of the novel—and the performances, especially by Micha Lescot, Didier Sandre, and Dominique Blanc.

== Cast ==
- Micha Lescot as Marcel, the narrator
- Caroline Tillette as Albertine Simonet
- Didier Sandre as Baron de Charlus
- Dominique Blanc as Madame Verdurin
- Éric Ruf as Charles Swann
- Valentine Varela as Oriane de Guermantes
- Bernard Farcy as Basin, Duke of Guermantes
- Catherine Samie as Marcel's grandmother
- Dominique Valadié as Marcel's mother
- Roland Copé as Count Norpois
- Jean-Claude Drouot as Elstir
- Andy Gillet as Robert de Saint-Loup
- Anne Danais as Françoise
- Marie-Sophie Ferdane as Gilberte Swann
- Michel Fau as Jupien
- Vincent Heden as Morel
- Françoise Bertin as Madame de Villeparisis
- Hervé Pierre as Verdurin
- Philippe Morier-Genoud as Docteur Cottard
- Laure-Lucille Simon as Andrée
- Arthur Igual as Bloch
- Oleg Ossina as Marcel as a boy
