= Gary Grant (actor) =

British actor

- Born: 1977 (age 48–49); Barnet, England, UK

Gary Grant (born 1977) in North London, England, is a British television actor. He is best known for portraying DC Paul Riley in The Bill from 2000 to 2002. He has also appeared in Dangerfield, Doctors and Essex Boys. He played drug dealer Ty in Hollyoaks in 1999. Grant is also an award-winning film director with emotional piece Daisy's Last Stand.

In 2018, he appeared in two feature films: alongside Cristian Solimeno as the dappy salesman Tim in the British psychological thriller Welcome to Curiosity and in I Made This For You directed by Solimeno. He has since written and directed two upcoming feature films, I'm Not You and Under Influence. I'm Not You was screened at Outsouth Film Festival in North Carolina and London Independent Film Festival.
