= There's Something in the Barn =

2023 film by Magnus Martens

- Theatrical release poster
- Directed by: Magnus Martens
- Written by: Aleksander Kirkwood Brown
- Produced by: Kjetil Omberg; Jørgen Storm Rosenberg
- Starring: Martin Starr; Amrita Acharia; Kiran Shah; Zoe Winther-Hansen; Townes Bunner; Calle Hellevang Larsen; Henriette Steenstrup; Paul Monaghan
- Cinematography: Mika Orasmaa
- Edited by: Kalle Doniselli Gulbrandsen
- Music by: Lasse Enersen
- Production companies: 74 Entertainment; XYZ Films; Charades; Don Films
- Distributed by: Scandinavian Film Distribution
- Release dates: 23 September 2023 (Fantastic Fest); 10 November 2023 (Norway)
- Running time: 100 minutes
- Country: Norway
- Language: English
- Box office: $1.3 million

There's Something in the Barn is a 2023 Norwegian comedy horror film starring Martin Starr, Amrita Acharia, and Kiran Shah. Directed by Magnus Martens and written by Aleksander Kirkwood Brown, the film tells the story of an American family that, after moving to Norway, encounters murderous elves. The film premiered on 23 September 2023 at Fantastic Fest, and was released in Norway on 10 November 2023, to positive reviews.

== Premise ==
A family fulfills a father's dream of moving back to their ancestral family farm in Gudbrandsdalen, Norway. Their teenage daughter, Nora, is angry about leaving her friends behind. Carol, the stepmother, tries to put on a happy face for the family, while Bill, the naive father, is excited for the adventure and mostly oblivious to the obstacles. In their new home, their younger son Lucas stumbles on a strange creature living in the barn, revealed to be an elf. A local man tells Lucas about a local legend where humans must follow three very important "Barn Elf Rules", which Lucas also tries to enlighten his family with: no bright lights, no modern changes, no loud noises. However, they ignore him and proceed to break all three rules, leading to gruesome consequences.

== Cast ==
- Martin Starr as Bill Nordheim
- Amrita Acharia as Carol Nordheim
- Kiran Shah as main elf
- Townes Bunner as Lucas Nordheim
- Zoe Winther-Hansen as Nora Nordheim
- Calle Hellevang Larsen as Tor Åge
- Henriette Steenstrup as Liv
- Jeppe Beck Laursen as Raymond
- Eldar Vågan as Erik
- Marianne Jonger as Bente
- Claire Dore as Jess
- Paul Monaghan as ancient elf

== Production ==
The film was produced by 74 Entertainment, co-produced by Don Films, and co-financed by XYZ Films. Charades picked up the film to handle sales in October 2022. Martin Starr and Amrita Acharia, who also starred together in 74 Entertainment's Dead Snow 2, were cast in lead roles. Magnus Martens directed from a script by Aleksander Kirkwood Brown.

Principal photography took place from October 24 to late November 2022 on location in Norway, in Ringebu and Tretten, with half the film shot on stages in Lithuania. Due to limited snowfall during that time, Starr said that snow had to be brought in by truckload to accomplish the vision that was needed for the film.

== Release ==
There's Something in the Barn premiered on 23 September 2023 at Fantastic Fest in Austin, Texas, and was released in Norway by Scandinavian Film Distribution on 10 November 2023. The film was released in the United Kingdom by Vertigo Films on 1 December 2023, followed by a release in the United States by Stage 6 Films on 5 December 2023.

== Reception ==
=== Box office ===
There's Something in the Barn opened in 128 Norway cinemas to number three with $118,304. It grossed a total of $858,318. The film made $437,334 in other markets, for a worldwide total of $1.3 million.

=== Critical response ===
On the review aggregator website Rotten Tomatoes, 80% of 25 critics' reviews are positive, with an average rating of 6.2/10.

Alan Jones of the Radio Times scored the film a three out of five, describing the film as "Gremlins meets National Lampoon's Christmas Vacation". He thought that Martens struggled to "strike quite the right balance between the two genres", and ended his review with, "but the film's conclusion is full-bore gore, and there's a certain amount of fun to be had as the festive frights turn a dark shade of claret". Cath Clark writing for The Guardian gave the film a score of two out of five and wrote, "It's a silly horror that's not as good, or as bad, as you'd hoped: neither funny enough nor ever properly scary. That said, there are some cheerfully gory bits and a smattering of decent culture clash gags".

Rafael Motamayor of /Film wrote, "There's Something in the Barn doesn't reinvent the wheel, but it offers a fun Christmas horror movie with cultural authenticity, and a great companion to Krampus and Rare Exports". Digital Spy's Ian Sandwell gave a positive review, "If you've ever watched Gremlins and thought, 'This would be really good with murderous elves', There's Something in the Barn is the bloody, festive treat for you". He ended his review with, "It doesn't all work perfectly, as there's an overdone running gag about US gun culture, as well as an ill-timed joke about the Oslo Accords between Israel and Palestine. But for the most part, everybody involved knows the movie they're making and pitch it accordingly".

== See also ==
- List of holiday horror films
- List of Norwegian films
