= Matt Di Angelo =

British actor and singer (born 1987)

- Born: Mario Angelo Stavrou Constantinou; 1 May 1987 (age 39); Enfield, London, England
- Occupations: Actor, singer
- Years active: 1997–present
- Spouse: Sophia Perry (m. 2021)
- Children: 2

Mario Angelo Stavrou Constantinou (born 1 May 1987), professionally known as Matt Di Angelo, is a British actor and singer, best known for his role as Dean Wicks in the BBC soap opera EastEnders. He also portrayed Sean Kennedy in the BBC drama series Hustle.

== Early life ==
Di Angelo was born in Enfield, London, England, to parents of Greek and Irish descent. He attended Southgate School, and studied acting, singing and dancing at Boden Studios (Enfield/Barnet), and the Sylvia Young Theatre School.

== Career ==
Di Angelo's first acting role was as Robbie in the television series Harbour Lights in the episode: "Rites of Passage" which first aired on 28 May 2000. Then he played Felix in the CBBC musical comedy series I Dream in 2004. This resulted in him making a few appearances in the Sunday morning children's TV show Smile. He appeared in the film Telling Lies in 2006.

That same year, he began appearing in his best-known role as Dean Wicks in the popular BBC soap opera EastEnders. He made his first appearance on 2 January 2006. It was announced on 18 August 2007 that Di Angelo would be leaving EastEnders following the departure of Phil Daniels (who played his on-screen stepfather Kevin Wicks). He described his departure as "a shock". Di Angelo finished filming EastEnders 12 December 2007 and his last appearance in the series aired on 7 February 2008.

Di Angelo's portfolio includes television commercials and modelling, and he has been a guest on a number of programmes, such as The Paul O'Grady Show, Saturday Kitchen, Ready Steady Cook, Hole in the Wall, Alan Carr's Celebrity Ding Dong, Weakest Link and The Friday Night Project.

From 11 December 2008 until 31 January 2009, he played the character of Hal in the play Loot in north London's Tricycle Theatre, then at Theatre Royal, Newcastle 3–7 February 2009.

He played Sean from series 5 to 8 of the 2009 series of the hit BBC One series, Hustle. He played Fitz Kreiner in the Doctor Who audio play The Company of Friends.

On 20 April 2009, Di Angelo's agent announced on their website that he would be filming a guest role in Casualty. This will be the series two-part finale "No Fjords in Finland", which aired on Saturday, 25 July and Saturday, 1 August 2009. The agent advised that he was busy recording a new pilot show called Fried Brain Sandwich about a stand-up comedian, to be directed by Guy Jenkin (Outnumbered and Drop the Dead Donkey).

On 21 July 2009, Di Angelo's agent announced on their website that he would be playing the lead role of Jack Stradler in the low-budget film Following Footsteps. He films throughout August for Perry Pictures.

Earlier in the year, Di Angelo supported 'A Night Less Ordinary,' a free ticket scheme for young people launched by Arts Council England in February 2009.

In May 2010, Di Angelo was filming Whiskey Robber for Parallel Pictures and series 7 of Hustle.

In April 2012, industry trade daily Screen International announced Di Angelo had been cast as the lead in British crime thriller Two Days in the Smoke alongside Stephen Marcus, Alan Ford, Lili Bordán and Velibor Topić.

In April 2014, Di Angelo returned to EastEnders, to reprise the role as Dean Wicks. In October 2015, it was announced that he would once again be leaving EastEnders. His last episode was on 5 February 2016.

On 30 March 2016, it was announced that Di Angelo had been cast in the second series of Ordinary Lies. Filming began in Cardiff, Wales on 21 March 2016.

=== Strictly Come Dancing ===
In 2007, Di Angelo competed as a contestant in series 5 of Strictly Come Dancing, where he was partnered with professional dancer Flavia Cacace. He and Cacace finished the competition as the runners-up, losing to Alesha Dixon and Matthew Cutler. They later competed in the 2007 Christmas special of the show, landing in third place.

They also competed together in the Strictly Come Dancing live arena tour from January to February 2008, and had won more shows than any other couple by coming first overall sixteen times and second ten times.

| Week # | Dance / Song | Judges' scores | | | | Result |
|---|---|---|---|---|---|---|
| Week # | Dance / Song | Revel Horwood | Philips | Goodman | Tonioli | Result |
| 1 | Cha-Cha-Cha / "Mama Told Me Not to Come" | 5 | 6 | 6 | 6 | Safe |
| 3 | Jive / "Shake, Rattle and Roll" | 7 | 7 | 8 | 8 | Safe |
| 4 | American Smooth / "For Once in My Life" | 9 | 9 | 9 | 9 | Safe |
| 5 | Pasodoble / "Smooth Criminal" | 7 | 8 | 8 | 8 | Safe |
| 6 | Viennese waltz / "When a Man Loves a Woman" | 8 | 6 | 7 | 8 | Bottom two; saved |
| 7 | Quickstep / "Is You Is or Is You Ain't My Baby" | 8 | 9 | 8 | 9 | Safe |
| 8 | Salsa / "Vehicle" | 9 | 10 | 9 | 10 | Safe |
| 9 | Tango / "What You Waiting For?"; Rumba / "Get Here" | 7; 8 | 7; 9 | 9; 8 | 9; 8 | Safe |
| 10 | Foxtrot / "Better Together"; Samba / "Blame It on the Boogie" | 4; 6 | 6; 7 | 8; 8 | 8; 8 | Safe |
| 11 | Argentine tango / "La yumba" Waltz / "Open Arms" | 8; 10 | 9; 10 | 9; 10 | 9; 10 | Safe |
| 12 | American Smooth / "For Once in My Life"; Salsa / "Vehicle"; Quickstep / "I Love to Boogie"; Showdance / "Are You Gonna Go My Way" | 9; 9; 9 | 9; 10; 8 | 9; 10; 9 | 9; 10; 9 | Runner-up |

== Personal life ==
Di Angelo married professional wedding planner Sophia Perry in 2021; the couple have twins, a boy and a girl, born in August 2022.

== Filmography ==
=== Films ===
| Year | Film | Role |
|---|---|---|
| 2008 | Telling Lies | Derek |
| 2010 | Following Footsteps | Jack Stadler |
| 2012 | Two Days in the Smoke | Brad Walker |

=== Television ===
| Year | Show | Role | Notes |
|---|---|---|---|
| 2000 | Harbour Lights | Robbie | 1 episode |
| 2004 | I Dream | Felix | 13 episodes |
| 2006–2008, 2014–2016, 2023–2024 | EastEnders | Dean Wicks | 406+ episodes |
| 2007 | Strictly Come Dancing | Contestant | Himself |
| 2007 | Ready Steady Cook | Contestant | Celebrity Ready Steady Cook |
| 2008 | Dani's House | Delivery Man | 1 episode |
| 2009–2012 | Hustle | Sean Kennedy | 24 episodes |
| 2009 | Casualty | Tom | 2 episodes |
| 2011 | Death in Paradise | Darren Moore | 1 episode |
| 2012–2014 | Borgia | Francesco Alidosi | 11 episodes |
| 2016 | Ordinary Lies | Fletch | Series 2; 6 episodes |

=== Radio ===
| Year | Show | Role | Notes |
|---|---|---|---|
| 2009 | Doctor Who | Fitz Kreiner | 1 episode |

== Awards and nominations ==
| Year | Award | Category | Work | Result | Ref. |
|---|---|---|---|---|---|
| 2006 | The British Soap Awards | Sexiest Male | EastEnders | Nominated | |
| 2007 | British Soap Awards | Sexiest Male | EastEnders | Nominated | |
| 2014 | Inside Soap Awards | Best Bad Boy | EastEnders | Shortlisted | |
| 2015 | Inside Soap Awards | Best Actor | EastEnders | Nominated | |
| 2015 | Inside Soap Awards | Best Bad Boy | EastEnders | Shortlisted | |
| 2024 | National Film Awards UK | Best Supporting Actor in a TV Series | EastEnders | Pending | |
| 2024 | RadioTimes.com Soap Awards | Best Villain | EastEnders | Pending | |
