= Interview with a Hitman =

- Theatrical release poster
- Directed by: Perry Bhandal
- Written by: Perry Bhandal
- Produced by: Perry Bhandal Dean Fishter
- Starring: Luke Goss; Stephen Marcus; Philip Whitchurch; Ray Panthaki; Caroline Tillette; Branko Tomovic
- Cinematography: Richard Swingle
- Edited by: Harry Skipp; Ben King
- Music by: Dan Teicher
- Production companies: Kirlian Pictures; Scanner Rhodes
- Distributed by: Wellgo (USA); Atlas GMBH (Germany); Kaleidoscope (UK); Universal Full Band (China); First International (France); Fine Films (Japan); Front Row (Middle East); M Pictures (Thailand); Ram Indo (Malaysia); Joy N Contents Group (Korea); Big Movie (Baltics); Hom (Benelux); One World Movies (India); Sound Space (Indonesia); Hollywood (Greece); Cinescape (Kuwait); Rio Negro AV (Brazil); Eagle Entertainment (Australia); Kotai Entertainment (Poland); Take One AB (Scandinavia)
- Release date: 20 July 2012
- Running time: 96 minutes
- Country: United Kingdom
- Language: English

Interview with a Hitman is a 2012 British action film written and directed by Perry Bhandal. The film tells the story of Viktor (Luke Goss), a professional Romanian hitman who agrees to tell his story to a disgraced film director desperate to discover a unique story that will help him rebuild his career. It was produced by Kirlian Pictures & Scanner Rhodes with the assistance of Northern Film & Media. The film stars Luke Goss, Caroline Tillette, Stephen Marcus, Danny Midwinter and Elliot Greene.

== Plot ==
Viktor (Luke Goss) is a professional assassin. The film is told using flashbacks in which Viktor explains to a disgraced filmmaker how he became a professional assassin.

He starts with his childhood; raised in a slum area in an outlying district of Bucharest, Romania. Threatened by two young neighbourhood bullies, whom he owed money to, his father also threatened by a local mafia. He decides to join the local mafia, for self preservation. Sergei, the local mafia lieutenant, takes him in after he proves his mettle. After returning home, he witnesses his father abusing his mother. Soon after; his father is assassinated, unable to pay off his debt to the local mafia.

Viktor's first assignment is to collect money owed to the mafia, but the man belittles the young lad and pays with his life. Victor kills the man's wife and was about to kill their two very young daughters when Sergei stops him. Viktor is moved to the city and trained by Sergei to be a hitman. In addition to preparation, eavesdropping, infiltration, and elimination, Sergei teaches him how to destroy a strong man by killing the people he cares for: "Sometimes, a simple bullet is not enough."

Working with Sergei until adulthood, they are assigned to work a drug purchase with Franco, the son of their boss Traficant. Franco attempts to kill the man he is making a deal with, and Viktor and Sergei are forced to kill the drug vendor and his bodyguards. Unfortunately, he was the son of a well-known mafia boss, Vadim. Sergei and Viktor are tasked with covering up the murder, but there are doubts. Sergei tries to dispatch Viktor, but is disarmed and taken prisoner. Sergei explains that he was compelled to kill Viktor by orders from Traficant, having no choice to either kill Viktor, or be killed himself. Only Viktor walks away, leaving a body double in his place, and burns his apartment out.

Having thus faked his own death, he begins a new life in London, by retrieving a wanted informant for a London mafia boss. Having proved his skill, he is next tasked with killing a British police officer who cannot be bought. This is accomplished by using liquid nicotine in the man's coffee, which induces heart failure. Celebrating with the mafia boss and two women, they are attacked, and discover that the boss's lieutenant sold them out. He kills the lieutenant, is invited to replace him, but declines. As a parting request, the boss asks him to kill a female reporter who is writing an article about him.

Viktor goes to a coffee shop, and some toughs come in and grab a woman and proceed to beat and rape her. He takes out the men to rescue her, finding out her name is Bethesda; they fall in love. Six months later, she is pregnant, he reacts badly. He tracks down the reporter and shows mercy instead of killing her, advising her to leave the country and start over elsewhere. Viktor wants to quit his job, but cannot. His childhood friend Cesar, tracks him down and tries to kill him, but the opposite happens.

Returning home to Bucharest, Viktor finds out that the two bullies who threatened him as a kid were now local mafia men. Two bullets later, Viktor pays a visit to Traficant in a restaurant, and after an interesting conversation, Viktor shoots Trafficant. He pays a visit to Alexei, ordering him to bury the video evidence of him being alive, and warns him he will be next if news gets out.

Finally, the interview nears a conclusion. Bethesda arrives, and Viktor gives the man a ring, which belongs to the interviewer's brother. Bethesda tells the story of two girls taken from their father and sold into service; one sister is weaker, and dies, but the other is stronger, and survives. Bethesda is that sister; she was used by the interviewer when she was only 10. The interview was a trap, and Viktor shoots him.

Unsettled, Viktor sits down at Bethesda's invitation, then she shoots him with the gun the interviewer had dropped, and explains why. She reveals that Viktor killed Bethesda's parents when he first started his career as a hitman. She sold him out to Traficant, engineered the destruction of the interviewer, and ultimately, of Viktor himself. She tells him that the baby is a boy, and when the boy is old enough, she will show him the video of the interview so he can know what kind of man his father was, and despise him.

== Cast ==
- Luke Goss as Viktor
- Caroline Tillette as Bethesda
- Stephen Marcus as Traffikant
- Adrian Bouchet as Brett
- Branko Tomovic as Anatolie
- Ray Panthaki as Franco
- Philip Whitchurch as Tosca
- Danny Midwinter as Sergei
- Elliot Greene as Young Viktor
- Patrick Lyster as Xavier

== Production ==
Interview with a Hitman was shot in 18 days in August 2011 on location in and around Newcastle upon Tyne, England and Bucharest, Romania. It is the debut feature of Perry Bhandal as writer and director.

== Release ==
The film was released Theatrically on Friday, 20 July 2012 in Ireland and UK, and Kuwait in August 2012 and on UK DVD and Blu-ray 27 August 2012.

The film had its market premiere at the Cannes Film Festival in May 2012 and has gone on to sell in Major territories worldwide.

Interview with a Hitman was released in the US on 5 March 2013.

The film is also known as Hitman Reloaded (Australia), Entrevista com Hitman (Brazil), Synentefxi m' enan ektelesti (Greece), Wywiad z Hitmanem (Poland), Intervju sa Hitmenom (Serbia).

== Critical reception ==
It was given a rating of 44% by the review aggregator Rotten Tomatoes.
