= Stephen Marcus =

British actor (born 1962)

- Born: Stephen Mark Scott; 18 June 1962 (age 64); Portsmouth, Hampshire, England
- Occupation: Actor
- Years active: 1985–present

Stephen Marcus (born Stephen Mark Scott; 18 June 1962) is a British actor, best known for his role as Nick the Greek in the British gangster movie Lock, Stock and Two Smoking Barrels (1998).

Other credits include My Beautiful Laundrette (1985), Hear My Song (1991), The Beautician and the Beast (1997), Angela's Ashes (1999), Quills (2000), Kinky Boots (2005), The Greatest Game Ever Played (2005), Hogfather (2006), Kingdom (2007), Lark Rise to Candleford (2008), Ninja Assassin (2009), Interview with a Hitman (2012), Starhunter ReduX (2017), Rise of the Footsoldier 3: The Pat Tate Story (2017), and The Big Ugly (2020).

== Early life ==
Marcus, who was born June 18, 1962 in Portsmouth, Hampshire, became an actor in 1984 after three years of training at ArtsEd Performing Arts School in Chiswick, London Borough of Hounslow.

== Career ==
Marcus spent his early career touring throughout London's parks and schools in Robin Hood & The Tree Trick, securing his first film role as 'Moose' in the cult film My Beautiful Laundrette (1985), alongside Saeed Jaffrey and Daniel Day-Lewis. From 1989, Marcus played Dave, the lover of Sharon, (played by Pauline Quirke), in the comedy Birds of a Feather (1989–1991).

A year of acting in commercials introduced Marcus to director Peter Chelsom, who cast him as Gordon in Hear My Song (1991), opposite Ned Beatty. He starred opposite Timothy Dalton in The Beautician and the Beast (1997), and alongside Richard Harris in Savage Hearts.

In 1996, Marcus's agent arranged a meeting for a small low-budget movie with a then-unknown director named Guy Ritchie, who offered Marcus the role of 'Nick the Greek', alongside Nick Moran, Vinnie Jones, Jason Statham and Matthew Vaughn, in British gangster comedy Lock, Stock and Two Smoking Barrels.

Marcus appeared in Alan Parker's Angela's Ashes (1999); he played Bouchon in Quills (2000), alongside Kate Winslet, Michael Caine, Joaquin Phoenix and Geoffrey Rush; Kinky Boots (2005), he played Iris opposite Judi Dench, and portrayed golfer Ted Ray in the Bill Paxton directed The Greatest Game Ever Played (2005).

Marcus starred in the television series: Starhunter 2300, in which he played Rudolpho De Luna; he played the co-lead in the BBC series Cavegirl; he played Banjo and Broadman in the adaptations of Terry Pratchett's Hogfather (2006), and Marcus also appeared with Stephen Fry in Kingdom (2007). Marcus has also completed two films with the Wachowskis: Speed Racer and Ninja Assassin (2009).

He starred in Perry Bhandal's Interview with a Hitman (2012, filmed 2011) as Traffikant, a Romanian crime boss, alongside Luke Goss. In April 2012, he completed filming for independent British gangster thriller Two Days in the Smoke, in which he played the hitman Ben, alongside Snatch star Alan Ford and Matt Di Angelo from BBC Hustle. Smoke director Ben Pickering cast him as the vengeful Max in his second feature, the British psychological thriller Welcome to Curiosity (2018). The same year, launched a new Gangster London walking tour in association with Brit Movie Tours, in which he explores the dark history of London's East End. He was series regular Matthew Welby in Lark Rise to Candleford (2008), and as Rudolpho deLuna in Starhunter ReduX (2017). He starred as Jack Whomes in the British gangster movie Rise of the Footsoldier 3: The Pat Tate Story (2017).

== Filmography ==
Key
†	Denotes works that have not yet been released

=== Film ===
Year	Film	Role	Notes
1985	My Beautiful Laundrette	Moose	
1991	Hear My Song	Gordon	
1992	In Dreams	Policeman / Roman Guard	Television film
1995	Savage Hearts	Hector	
1996	Killer Tongue	Ralph	
1997	The Beautician and the Beast	Ivan	
1997	Black Velvet Band	Nudge	Television film
1998	Lock, Stock and Two Smoking Barrels	Nick the Greek	
1999	Angela's Ashes	English Agent	
2000	Secrets & Lines	Animal	Television film
2000	Sorted	Rob	
2000	Quills	Bouchon	
2001	Fourplay	Davey	
2001	Iris	Taxi Driver	
2001	Redemption Road	Joe	
2002	AKA	Tommy	
2002	Unconditional Love	Thug in Rain	
2003	Don't Look Back	Uncle Max	
2004	The Baby Juice Express	Lenny von Something	
2004	Stage Beauty	Thomas Cockerell	
2005	The Greatest Game Ever Played	Ted Ray	
2005	Kinky Boots	Big Mike	
2008	Speed Racer	Security Goon	
2009	Ninja Assassin	Kingpin	
2012	The Hot Potato	Freddie	
2012	Interview with a Hitman	Traffikant	
2013	Getting Back to Zero	Tommy	
2013	Fast & Furious 6	Davies	
2013	Justin and the Knights of Valour	Guards 1,2 & 3	Voice role
2013	It's a Lot	Mr. Hatherly	
2014	AB Negative	Mr. Fines	
2014	The Smoke	Ben	
2016	The Pit and the Pendulum: A Study in Torture	The Prisoner	Short film
2016	Sanctuary	Joseph	
2016	Gridiron UK	Eddie	
2016	Eliminators	George	
2017	The Rizen	The Executioner	
2017	Fanged Up	Reeves	
2017	Rise of the Footsoldier 3: The Pat Tate Story	Jack Whomes	
2018	Walk like a Panther	'Gladiator' Glenn Higgins	
2018	Welcome to Curiosity	Max	
2019	The Rizen: Possession	The Executioner	
2020	The Big Ugly	Big James	
2025	A Blind Bargain	Mallos	

=== Television ===
Year	Title	Role	Notes
1987	Hardwicke House	Joe	Episode: "Prize-giving"
1987	Brush Strokes	2nd Pub Customer	Episode: "Series 2, Episode 6"
1988	Rockliffe	Masked Spokesman	Episode: "Top Man"
1989	The Bill	Purkis	Episode: "Overspend"
1989	Boon	Curly Robinson	Episode: "Do Not Forsake Me"
1989–91	Birds of a Feather	Dave	Recurring role; 3 episodes
1990	ScreenPlay Firsts	Mal	Episode: "Arrivederci Millwall"
1990	Stay Lucky	Neil	Episode: "Bring Back My Barny to Me"
1991	Van der Valk	Burly Man	Episode: "Doctor Hoffmann's Children"
1991	Billy Webb's Amazing Stories	Chip Shop Man	Episode: "Part Three"
1992	Me, You and Him	Graham's Father	Episode: "On the Town"
1992	Gone to Seed	Customer	Episode: "Series 1, Episode 4"
1993	The Bill	Wayne Smith	Episode: "The Law in Their Hands"
1993	Paul Merton: The Series	Various	Episode: "Series 2, Episode 3"
1993	Red Dwarf	Bear Strangler McGee	Episode: "Gunmen of the Apocalypse"
1993	KYTV	Large Man	Episode: "Get Away with You"
1993	Between the Lines	Mortuary Assistant	Episode: "Some Must Watch"
1994	99-1	McCarthy's Man / Pursuer	Episode: "The Hard Sell"
1994	Frank Stubbs Promotes	Journalist	Episode: "Babies"
1994	Screen One	Newman	Episode: "Doggin' Around"
1995	The Bill	Ade Lester	Episode: "Water Wings"
1995	Crime Story	Gary Thompson	Episode: "Hot Dog Wars"
1995	The Glam Metal Detectives	Various	Recurring role; 5 episodes
1995	Rumble	Melvin	Series regular; 6 episodes
1995	Class Act	Geoff	Episode: "Series 2, Episode 2"
1995	The Thin Blue Line	Terry	Episode: "Honey Trap"
1995	Coogan's Run	Gerald the Sumo Magician	Episode: "Thursday Night Fever"
1996	Our Friends in the North	Cyril Hellyer	Episode: "1966"
1996	Kavanagh QC	Baxter	Episode: "A Stranger in the Family"
1997	The Detectives	Fat Reg	Episode: "The Curse of the Comanches"
1997	Paul Merton in Galton and Simpson's...	Thug	Episode: "The Wrong Man"
1998	The Bill	Tony Bladwell	Episode: "Heat and Light"
1998	Real Women	Van Driver	Episode: "The Hitch"
1998	Dangerfield	Jay Butterfield	Episode: "Double Helix"
1999	Adam's Family Tree	Bulgar the Bulgarian	Episode: "Here Comes the Hun"
1999	Roger Roger	Detective Sergeant Calderwood	Episode: "Love Rules the Heart, Money Takes the Soul"
2000–04	Starhunter	Rudolpho deLuna	Series regular; 44 episodes
2002	The Basil Brush Show	Santa Claus	Episode: "Molly Christmas"
2002	Cavegirl	Dad	Series regular; 18 episodes
2004	Mile High	Dave	Episode: "Series 2, Episode 3"
2004	The Lenny Henry Show		Episode: "Revival Pilot"
2004	Eyes Down	Bloke	Episode: "Thief"
2006	Without a Trace	Roger	Episode: "Check Your Head"
2006	Casualty	Tommy Indler	Episode: "Different Worlds"
2006	Terry Pratchett's Hogfather	Banjo Cropper	Miniseries; 2 episodes
2007	Doctor Who	Jailer	Episode: "The Shakespeare Code"
2007	Kingdom	Hill	Recurring role; 3 episodes
2007	The Bill	Cliff Taylor	Episode: "Crash Test"
2008	Lark Rise to Candleford	Matthew Welby	Series regular; 10 episodes
2008	Terry Pratchett's The Colour of Magic	Broadman	Miniseries; 1 episode
2008	Sunshine	Big Alan	Miniseries; 2 episodes
2008	Little Dorrit	Bath Attendant	Miniseries; 2 episodes
2011	Midsomer Murders	Silas Trout	Episode: "The Night of the Stag"
2012	The Comic Strip Presents...	Dirty Douglas	Episode: "Five Go to Rehab"
2013	Holby City	Jarvis Well	Episode: "The End of the Beginning"
2015	Man Down	Nightclub Bouncer	Episode: "Perfect Woman"
2015	EastEnders	Gordon Cook	Recurring role; 3 episodes
2016	Benidorm	Joe Luis	Episode: "Teetotal Geoff"
2016	Doctors	Dale Everly	Episode: "Home Help"
2016	The Coroner	Gobby Mitchell	Episode: "Those in Peril"
2017	Will	Henry Austen	Episode: "The Two Gentlemen"
2017	Starhunter Transformation	Rudolpho deLuna	Miniseries; 3 episodes
2017–18	Starhunter ReduX	Rudolpho deLuna	Series regular; 8 episodes
2019	NCIS: Los Angeles	Andy Green	Episode: "A Bloody Brilliant Plan"
2021	It's Always Sunny in Philadelphia	Nearby Patron	Episode: "The Gang's Still in Ireland"
