= The Smoke (film) =

- DVD
- Directed by: Ben Pickering
- Written by: Darren Ripley
- Starring: Matt Di Angelo; Lili Bordán; Alan Ford; Stephen Marcus; Lindsay Armaou; Anna Passey
- Cinematography: Bruce Melhuish
- Edited by: Steven Forrester; Ben Nugent
- Music by: Luke Corradine
- Production company: Slate 4 Films
- Distributed by: Signature Entertainment (UK), Shami Media Group (US)
- Release date: 20 October 2014
- Running time: 89 minutes
- Country: United Kingdom
- Language: English

The Smoke, also known as Two Days in the Smoke (worldwide title outside UK/Ireland: London Payback), is a 2014 British crime thriller film directed by Ben Pickering and starring Matt Di Angelo, Lili Bordán, Stephen Marcus, Lindsay Armaou, Anna Passey and Alan Ford. It was written by Darren Ripley.

== Plot ==
Lawyer Brad Walker is having a bad day. His girlfriend Sasha has left him for a mate of his. And he's lost his job. While drowning his sorrows, Brad overhears a conversation between two drug dealers. In a moment of madness, Brad decides to steal thousands of pounds from their boss Jack, an intimidating gangster who will stop at nothing to get his money back and exact retribution on the one who took it.

== Cast ==
- Matt Di Angelo as Brad
- Lili Bordán as Jodie
- Alan Ford as Jack
- Lindsay Armaou as Georgina
- Stephen Marcus as Ben
- Darren Ripley as Phil
- Velibor Topic as Dmitri
- Christian Brassington as Tom
- Anna Passey as Sasha
- Jeff Leach as Dean
- Funda Önal as Sister Josephine
- George Weightman as Kingo
- Martin Richardson as Greg
- Duncan Casey as Raef
- Ricky Groves as Sweeney
- Frazer Hines as Mr. Hemmings
- Ayden Callaghan as Liam
- Jamila Jennings-Grant as Lucy
- Clark Vasey as Warren

== Production ==
In April 2012, Screen Daily announced Matt Di Angelo, Alan Ford and Stephen Marcus had all signed on to appear in the film under its shooting title Two Days in the Smoke.

Sections of the film were filmed at Tower Bridge, Covent Garden, St Pancras railway station, RAF Uxbridge, the Apex London Wall Hotel and Apex City of London Hotel, and the Pont Alexandre III bridge over the River Seine in Paris, France.

The budget for the film was over £500,000 and the film was the first to be funded using the UK Government's Seed Enterprise Investment Scheme, launched while the film was mid-production.

The soundtrack features songs from Grammy-nominated En Vogue, Some Velvet Morning and an end title song by Lindsay Armaou (of Irish girlband B*Witched, who also stars in the film).

The film was picked up at Cannes in 2014 by UK distributor Signature Entertainment and renamed The Smoke. Their linear studio cut of the film was released in the UK on 20 October 2014. The film was released in the US and other countries as London Payback.

The non-linear Director's cut, featuring 12 additional minutes of unseen footage including an opening monologue and the last known screen appearance of the late British actor Malcolm Tierney (best known for his roles in Star Wars and Braveheart, who died before the film was completed), is as yet unreleased.
