= Kiran Shah =

Kenyan actor and stunt double (born 1956)

Kiran Shah MBE
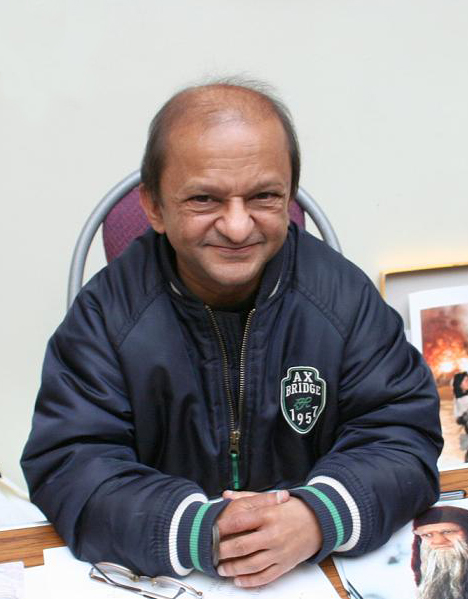
- Shah in 2006
- Born: 28 September 1956 (age 70); Nairobi, Kenya
- Occupations: Actor, stuntman
- Years active: 1975–present
- Height: 4 ft 2 in (127 cm)

Kiran Jethalal Shah MBE (born 28 September 1956) is a Kenyan actor and stunt double.

Shah was born in Nairobi, Kenya to an Indian family. He lived in Kenya until he was twelve years old, when he moved to India with his family. While living in India, he became interested in films, and when his family moved to Feltham, he became involved in show business. His first film was Candleshoe (1977), as a stand-in. When stunt coordinator Bob Anderson asked him to do stunts as well, his career was started. Shah played the part of Bolum in The People That Time Forgot (1977).

Shah is often confused with Deep Roy; they are both dwarf Nairobi-born Kenyan actors of Indian descent who got their starts in film and television in the late 1970s. He is the world's shortest stuntman according to the Guinness World Records. He has appeared as an actor in 31 films and 37 as a stuntman or body double.

== Stand-in, stunt, and background work ==
He has been in several blockbuster films since, such as Superman (1978), Superman II (1980), Raiders of the Lost Ark (1981), The Dark Crystal (1982), Return of the Jedi (1983), Legend (1985), Aliens (1986), The Sign of Four (1987), Bullseye! (1990), Braveheart (1995), and Titanic (1997) where he stunt doubled all the children in the film.

He has appeared as a stunt double or stand-in in The Lord of the Rings and The Hobbit film series. He was the scale double for Elijah Wood as Frodo, though he doubled for all the other main hobbits, being the only scale-double capable of stunts. He doubled Bilbo Baggins as played by both Martin Freeman (in The Hobbit: An Unexpected Journey, The Hobbit: The Desolation of Smaug, and The Hobbit: The Battle of the Five Armies) and Ian Holm (The Lord of the Rings: The Fellowship of the Ring). He is one of only three actors to play the titular character in the Hobbit films.

== Character work ==
His most featured role was in The Chronicles of Narnia: The Lion, the Witch and the Wardrobe, where he played Ginarrbrik. He also portrayed an Andaman islander in the Sherlock Holmes film The Sign of Four, and the monster who came out of a painting and attacked Natasha Richardson in the 1986 film Gothic. In addition to doubling for Martin Freeman as Bilbo in The Hobbit: An Unexpected Journey, he also appeared as the Goblin Scribe.

Shah appeared as the mysterious figure in the Steven Moffat scripted "Listen", the fourth episode of the eighth series of Doctor Who, also episode 2 of series 10 as Emojibot 1 in "Smile".

Shah appeared in the 2015 Star Wars: The Force Awakens, as Teedo, a small, brutish scavenger that roams the planet Jakku's vast wasteland on his semi-mechanical Luggabeast.

== Poetry ==
In addition to being an actor and a stuntman, Kiran is also a poet. His poetry has been published in Great Britain and the United States.

== Filmography (selected) ==
- The People That Time Forgot (1977) as Bolum
- Raiders of the Lost Ark (1981) as Abu
- The Dark Crystal (1982) as Additional Performer
- Star Wars: Episode VI – Return of the Jedi (1983) as Ewok / EG-6
- Greystoke: The Legend of Tarzan, Lord of the Apes (1984) as Primate Sequences
- Legend (1985) as Blunder
- Gothic (1986) as Fuseli Monster
- Sherlock Holmes: The Sign of Four (1987) as Tonga
- The Adventures of Baron Munchausen (1988) as Executioner's Assistant
- Bullseye! (1990) as Little Boss at Auction
- U.F.O. (1993) as Genghis Khan
- Black Beauty (1994) as man with Tambourine (uncredited)
- Harry Potter and the Philosopher's Stone (2001) as Goblin (uncredited)
- Lord of the Rings trilogy (2001–2003) as scale double for Elijah Wood as Frodo.
- The Biggest Step (2002) as Luk
- The Chronicles of Narnia: The Lion, the Witch and the Wardrobe (2005) as Ginarrbrik
- The Dork of the Rings (2006) as himself
- The Passion (2008) as Jude
- Harvey Putter and the Ridiculous Premise (2010) as Dumpy the Houseschmuck
- Your Highness (2011) as Tiniest One
- Kong Curling (2011) as Pepsimannen
- A Fantastic Fear of Everything (2012) as Small Man in Duvet
- The Hobbit: An Unexpected Journey (2012) as Goblin Scribe
- Doctor Who: "Listen" (2014) as Figure, "Smile" (2017) as Emojibot
- Star Wars: Episode VII - The Force Awakens (2015) as Teedo
- The Throbbit (2015) as himself
- Rogue One (2016) as Oolin Musters (uncredited)
- Star Wars: Episode VIII - The Last Jedi (2017) as Neepers Panpick
- Solo: A Star Wars Story (2018) as Karjj
- Star Wars: The Rise of Skywalker (2019) as Nambi Ghima
- Prop Culture (2020) as himself, Episode: "The Lion, Witch, and the Wardrobe"
- Andor (TV series) (2022) as Granik
- There's Something in the Barn (2023) as main elf

== Honours and awards ==
In the 2024 King's Birthday Honours, Shah was appointed a Member of the Order of the British Empire, for services to the film industry.
