= Lili Bordán =

Hungarian-American actress (born 1982)

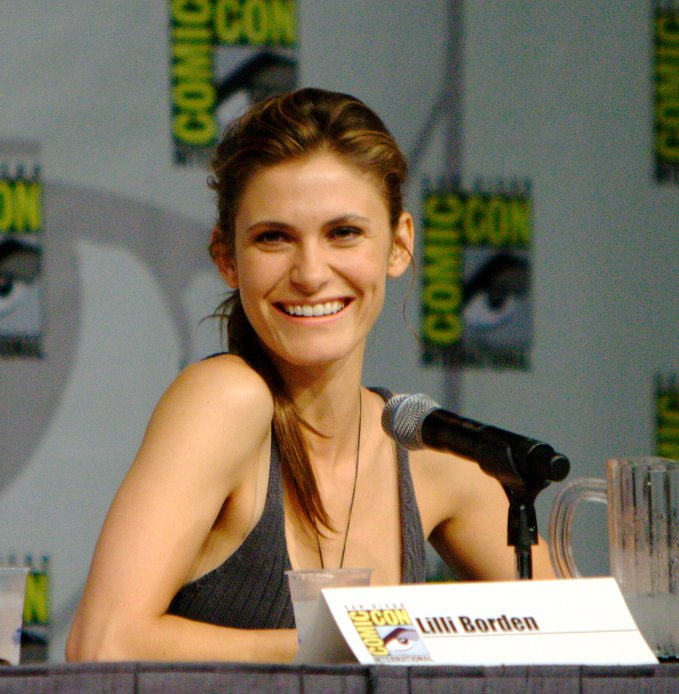
- Bordán at San Diego Comic-Con in 2011
- Born: 12 March 1982 (age 43); Bronxville, New York, U.S.
- Occupations: Actress, screenwriter, producer
- Years active: 2001–present

Lili Bordán (born March 12, 1982) is a Hungarian-American film and television actress.

== Early life and education ==
Lili Bordán was born in New York City, the daughter of Hungarian actress Irén Bordán. During school at Sarah Lawrence College, she completed her degree in theater and 19th century western literature. She also studied with acting coach Susan Batson. After finishing her studies, she moved to Hungary.

== Career ==
In 2001, Bordán began her acting career in television with a guest appearance on Law & Order: Special Victims Unit. From 2003 to 2010, she starred in supporting roles in several feature films such as Kistestvér (2003), 8mm 2 (2005), Joy Division (2006), and Kolorádó Kid (2010), and leading roles in films like Kinder Garden (2005), Cherry (2010), A Love Affair of Sorts (2011), and Egill: The Last Pagan (2011). In 2007, she continued her television career, guest starring on the shows Painkiller Jane, Robin Hood, and Könyveskép. Subsequent credits include Luke 11:17 (2008) and ER (2008). She had a recurring role on Silent Witness (2011), as Anna Sándor and later another recurring role in Casino (2011), as Mirtill. On February 10, 2011, it was announced that Bordán would join the main cast of the military science fiction drama Battlestar Galactica: Blood & Chrome, portraying Dr. Beka Kelly, a former employee of Graystone Industries, the company that created the Cylon. In 2012, she was cast as the troubled lead Jodie in British thriller Two Days In The Smoke, released in 2014 as The Smoke in the UK and London Payback in the rest of the world. The Smoke director Ben Pickering cast her as Dr. Jones in his second feature Welcome to Curiosity, due for release in the USA and Canada on 25 May 2018.

== Filmography ==
Film
| Year | Title | Role | Notes |
|---|---|---|---|
| 2003 | Kistestvér | Ági | |
| 2005 | Kinder Garden | Baba | translator |
| 2005 | 8mm 2 | Dóra | Direct-to-video |
| 2005 | Csak szex és más semmi | Fiatal lány | |
| 2005 | München | Bartender | uncredited |
| 2006 | Joy Division | Thomas' Sister | |
| 2006 | Szüzijáték | Vacsoravendég | |
| 2006 | Kirándulás | Juli | Short film (writer and co-producer) |
| 2006 | Egy bolond százat csinál | Menyasszony | |
| 2006 | Tündérmese | Rebeka | Short film |
| 2007 | The Moon and the Stars | Journalist | |
| 2007 | 3 (történet a szerelemröl) | n/a | Short film |
| 2007 | Téli mese | Anita | Short film |
| 2007 | Az emigráns | Banktisztviselõ | |
| 2010 | Finders Keepers | Woman | Short film |
| 2010 | Kolorádó Kid | Egyetemista lány | |
| 2010 | Cherry. | Jules Ostrovsky | |
| 2010 | The Story of F*** | Receptionist | uncredited |
| 2011 | A Love Affair of Sorts | Enci | Short film (writer) |
| 2011 | Boxed In | Sarah | Short film |
| 2012 | Titans of Newark | Calypso | Short film |
| 2014 | The Smoke | Jodie | |
| 2015 | The Martian | Blair | |
| 2015 | Egill: The Last Pagan | Asgerd | Voice |
| 2016 | A Life Lived | Irén | |
| 2018 | Book Club | Irene | |
| 2018 | Welcome to Curiosity | Dr. Jones | |

Television
| Year | Title | Role | Notes |
|---|---|---|---|
| 2001 | Law & Order: Special Victims Unit | Oksana Parulis | Episode: "Parasites" |
| 2005 | The Best Man | Gretchen | TV movie |
| 2007 | Painkiller Jane | Sophia | Episode: "What Lies Beneath" |
| 2007 | Robin Hood | Joan | Episode: "Ducking and Diving" |
| 2007 | Könyveskép | Juli | Episode: "Nyolclábú tükör" |
| 2008 | Luke 11:17 | Mara | Episode: "Be Kind Rewind" |
| 2008 | ER | Mrs. Phoenix | Episode: "Age of Innocence" |
| 2010 | Level 26: Dark Prophecy | Tiffany Adams | TV movie |
| 2011 | Silent Witness | Anna Sándor | Episodes: "Bloodlines: Part 1" "Bloodlines: Part 2" |
| 2011 | Casino | Mirtill | Episodes: "Mindenki tett" "Pörög a kerék" "Huszonhárom, vörös, páratlan" |
| 2011 | Zero | Valerie | TV movie |
| 2011 | Moon | Maggie Moon | TV movie |
| 2012 | The River | Hanna | Episode: "The Experiment" |
| 2012 | Battlestar Galactica: Blood & Chrome | Dr. Beka Kelly | TV movie |
| 2015 | An American Girl: Grace Stirs Up Success | Aunt Sophie | TV movie |
| 2016 | Westworld | Fortune Teller | Episode: "Contrapasso" |
