= Amrita Acharia =

Norwegian actress

Amrita Acharya
- अमृता आचार्य
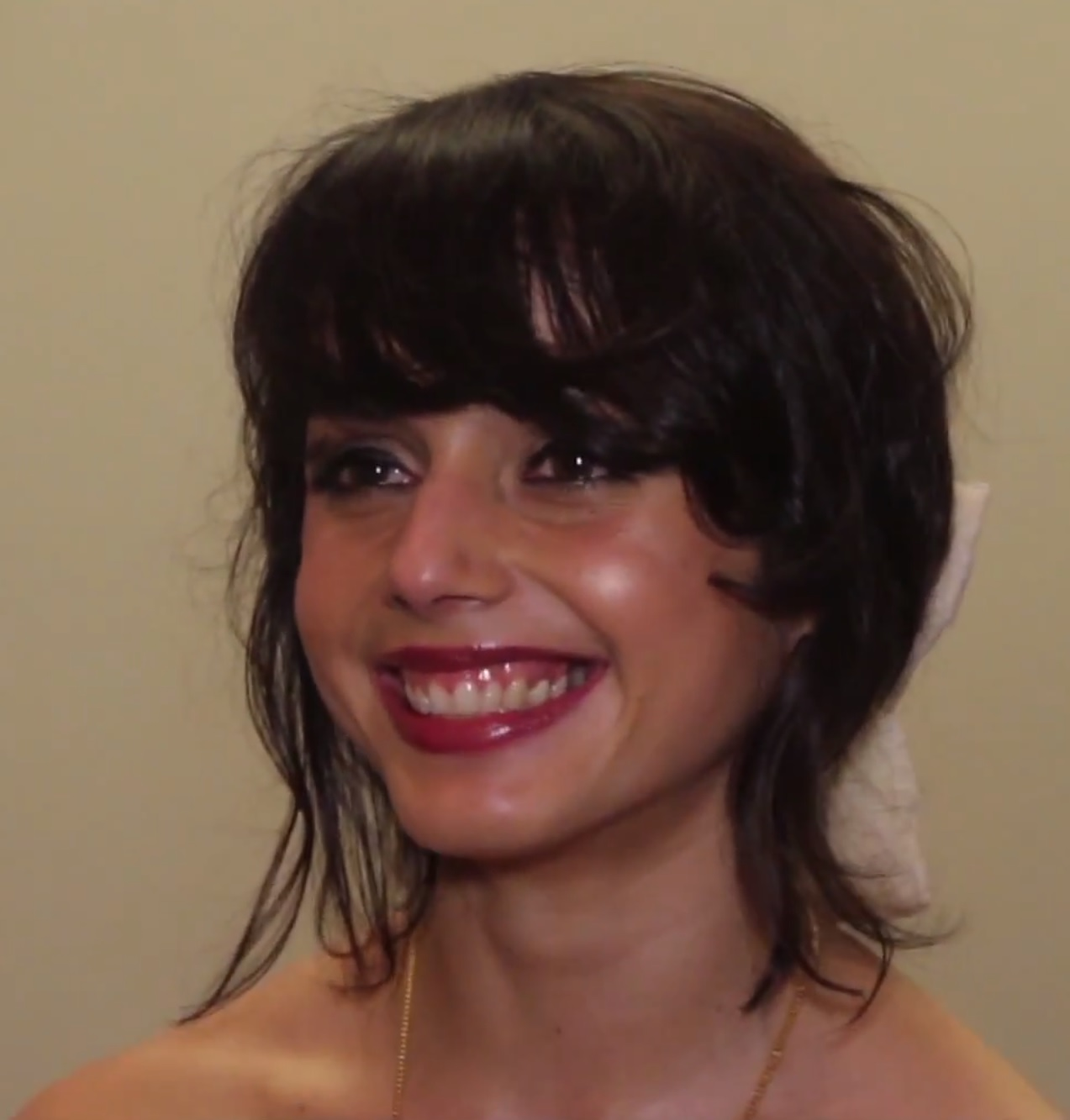
- Acharia at the Triforce SFF Awards in 2014
- Born: 31 July 1987 (age 39); Kathmandu, Kingdom of Nepal
- Other name: Amrita Acharya
- Occupation: Actress
- Years active: 2010–present
- Notable work: Game of Thrones
- Height: 1.57 m (5 ft 2 in)

Amrita Acharia (Nepali: अमृता आचार्य, also spelled Acharya) is a British actress of Nepalese–Ukrainian origins. She is best known for her roles as Irri in the HBO series Game of Thrones and as Dr. Ruby Walker in the ITV series The Good Karma Hospital.

== Early life ==
Acharia was born in Patan, Nepal. Her father is Nepalese and met her Ukrainian mother while studying in Lviv. Acharia grew up in Kathmandu, Ukraine, England and Norway. She spent her first seven years in Nepal, before her father's job took the family to England and then, as a teenager, to Tromsø, Norway.

At the age of 19, having finished high school in Norway, Acharia moved to England seeking a career in acting. She trained at ALRA.

== Career ==
Acharia played the role of Irri, a Dothraki servant of Daenerys Targaryen in the first two seasons of Game of Thrones. Her character died during the second season. In a scene cut from the broadcast programmes, Irri was strangled by her fellow handmaiden Doreah (played by Roxanne McKee).

Amrita also made an appearance as a school girl in the biographical film The Devil's Double.

Acharia played the lead in the Norwegian feature film I Am Yours, a role which landed her a nomination for Best Actress at the Norwegian Amanda Awards. The film was chosen as Norway's foreign-language Academy Awards submission.

In 2016 Acharia appeared in the role as State Prosecutor in the Norwegian TV-series Frikjent.

From 2017 to 2022 she starred as Dr Ruby Walker in the ITV series The Good Karma Hospital. Acharia played an NHS junior doctor who, faced with frustration at work and issues in her personal life, responds to an advert to work at a public hospital in the southern Indian state of Kerala (although the show was actually filmed in Sri Lanka rather than India). She was longlisted for the 2019 National Television Awards in the Best Drama Performance category for the role.

She is the lead in the British psychological thriller Welcome to Curiosity which is supposedly the world's first film to be entirely crowdfunded. The producers raised £200,000 through crowdfunding. It relates four interconnected stories based around a serial killer's escape from prison.

== Personal life ==
Acharia completed the London Marathon in 2016, with a time of 03:46:07.

She is an ambassador for the charity ChoraChori, which works to support displaced and trafficked Nepalese children from India. She speaks Ukrainian, Russian, English, and Norwegian. She does not speak Nepali, but stated she is planning to learn it.

== Filmography ==
Key
†	Denotes projects that have not yet been released

=== Film ===
Year	Title	Role	Notes
2010	In Company of Wolves	Rita	Short film
2010	Collectables	Woman	Short film
2011	The Devil's Double	School Girl	
2011	Lapland	Bride	TV film
2013	I Am Yours	Mina	Original title: Jeg er din
2014	Dead Snow 2: Red vs. Dead	Reidun	Original title: Død snø 2
2014	Camouflage	Amira	
2015	Amar Akbar & Tony	Richa	
2015	Of Her I Dream	Sharza	Short film
2015	Queen's Mile	Ania	Short film
2016	Kiss the Devil in the Dark	Lilly	Short film
2018	White Chamber	Ruth	
2018	Genesis	Alexa Brooks	
2018	Welcome to Curiosity	Zoe	
2018	Sibi and Dan	Kate	TV film
2019	Missing Link	Ama Lahuma	Voice role
2023	There's Something in the Barn	Carol Nordheim	
2023	Black Dog	Doctor	

=== Television ===
Year	Title	Role	Notes
2010	Casualty	Neela Sarin	Episode: "A Lesser Good"
2011	Doctors	Saskia Tremlett	Episode: "Candidate"
2011–2012	Game of Thrones	Irri	Recurring role, 13 episodes
2015	Pen & Paper & Laser Guns	Abby	Episode: "Series 1, Episode 2"
2016	Frikjent	Amina Sahir	Series regular, 8 episodes
2017	Red Dwarf	Waitress Greta	Episode: "Timewave"
2017–2022	The Good Karma Hospital	Dr. Ruby Walker	Series regular, 18 episodes
2020	The Sister	Holly Fox	Miniseries, 4 episodes
2022–2024	The Serpent Queen	Aabis	Series regular, 16 episodes
2026	Tiger Island	Narrator	BBC documentary miniseries, 2 episodes
2026	Van der Valk	Inge Palmberg	Episode: Series 4, Episode 3

=== Video game ===
Year	Title	Role	Notes
2025	Vampire: The Masquerade – Bloodlines 2	Safia Ulusoy	Voice role
2026	Dragon Quest VII Reimagined	Aishe	Voice role

=== Radio / Podcast ===
Year	Title	Role	Notes
2026	BBC Limelight: Wolf Valley	Lena	Miniseries, 5 episodes

== Theatre credits ==
Year	Title	Role	Venue	Ref.
2010	Elevator	She	New Diorama Theatre, London	
2014	At The End of Everything Else	Icka	Unicorn Theatre, London	
2015	The Chronicles of Kalki	Kalki	Gate Theatre, London	
2015	24 Hour Plays – Heroines	Yvette	Royal National Theatre, London	
2020	The Special Relationship	Anne Whyman	Soho Theatre, London	

== Awards and nominations ==
Year	Award	Category	Nominated work	Result
2012	Screen Actors Guild Award	Outstanding Performance by an Ensemble in a Drama Series (with Game of Thrones cast)	Game of Thrones	Nominated
2014	Amanda Award	Best Actress	I Am Yours	Nominated
2016	Utah Film Award	Best Supporting Actress: Short/Series	Kiss the Devil in the Dark	Nominated
2016	Northern Light Talent	Northern Light Talent		Won
2018	Maverick Movie Award	Best Supporting Actress: Short	Kiss the Devil in the Dark	Nominated
2018	Maverick Movie Award	Best Ensemble Performance: Short (with Dameon Clarke, Doug Jones, Gary Reimer, Rick Macy, Johnny Call, Amy Lia, Brian Higgins, Sonia Macari, Jake Stormoen, Jillian Joy, Beth Mayoh & James C. Morris)	Kiss the Devil in the Dark	Nominated
2019	The International Horror Hotel Film Award	Best Creature(s) (with Doug Jones, Chris Hanson, Jonathan Martin, Rebecca Martin, Amy Lia & Jillian Joy)	Kiss the Devil in the Dark	Nominated
2019	The International Horror Hotel Film Award	Best Supporting Actress, Short Film	Kiss the Devil in the Dark	Nominated
2020	CinEuphoria Award	Merit – Honorary Award (with Game of Thrones cast and crew)	Game of Thrones	Won
