= Ffynone House School =

Coordinates: 51.619°N 3.961°W

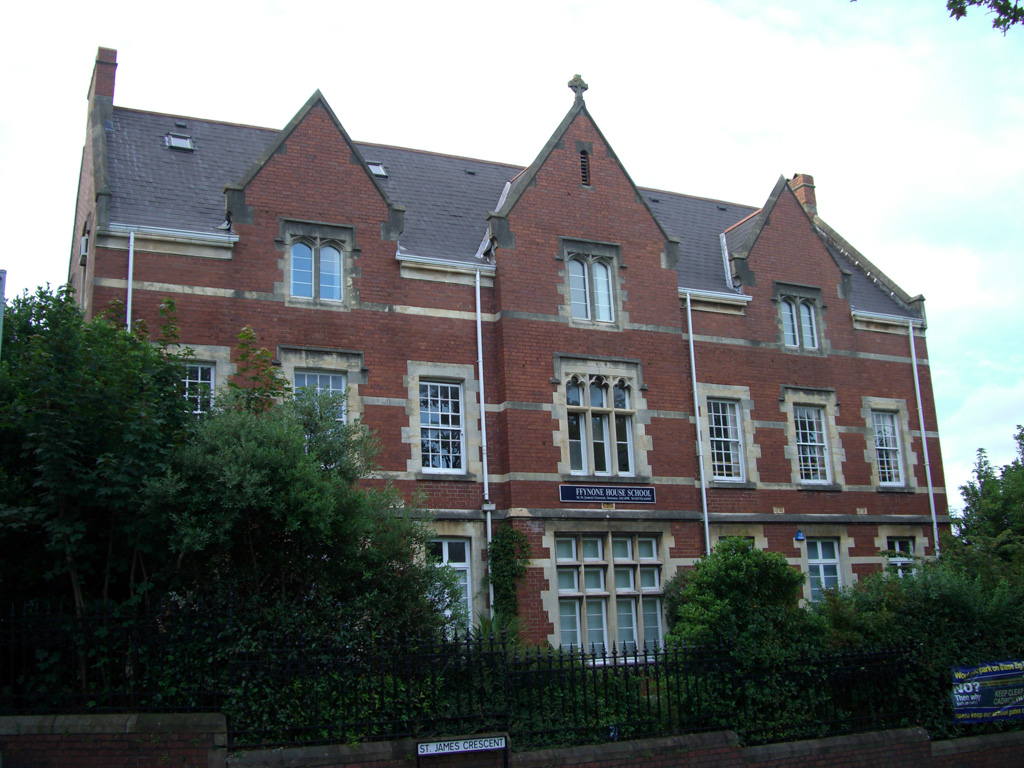

Location
- 36 St. James’ Crescent; Uplands, Swansea, SA1 6DR; Wales

Information
- Type: Private day school
- Established: 1973
- Department for Education URN: 401998 Tables
- Headteacher: Josie Miles
- Gender: Co-educational
- Age: 4 to 18
- Website: https://www.ffynonehouseschool.co.uk/

Ffynone House School is a private co-educational secondary day school in Swansea, Wales. It is situated in the Uplands area of the city at 36 St. James Crescent.

The school teaches children from age 4 to 18 (Primary to GCSE and A Level). It is owned by a charitable trust.

== History ==
Ffynone House School is located on the site that was formerly St Winefride's Convent School for Girls, run by nuns from 1887 to 1969 and throughout the Second World War. Ffynone House School was opened in 1973 by Swansea businessman Marshall David, and became Ffynone House School Trust (FHST) following the latter's death.

In 2007, both primary and secondary school businesses were purchased by Cognita, a private education consortium. The capital assets and freeholds of both schools remained the property of FHST. In 2013, Cognita considered the viability of maintaining the school in its current form which was located on two separate sites. The primary and secondary schools were subsequently separated; the Oakleigh House primary department remained inside the Cognita consortium, and Ffynone House School's secondary department was transferred back to the ownership of the FHS Charitable Trust. The school remains open as an independent day school in the Uplands area of Swansea.

== 2019 exam results ==
All qualifications, with the exception of ICT, are graded using the 9-1 system. Over half of all grades were at level 7 or above (equivalent to the old A/A*) with 19% at level 9.

100% of students studying Latin or Classical Civilisation attained an A*. In Mathematics, 83% of entries were graded level 7 or above (equivalent to the old grade A) with 50% at level 9-8 (A*). 58% of Chemistry grades were at level 9 and over 75% of Biology and Chemistry grades were levels 9–7. 83% of all History entrants scored level 7 or above.

== Headteachers ==
- Audrey Jackson 1973–1983
- Rev Howard Jones 1983–1984
- John Rhys Thomas 1984–2004
- Edwina Jones 2004–2008
- Nicola Walker 2009–2015
- Michael Boulding 2015–2022
- Hanan Khaleel 2022–2025
- Josie Miles 2025-Present

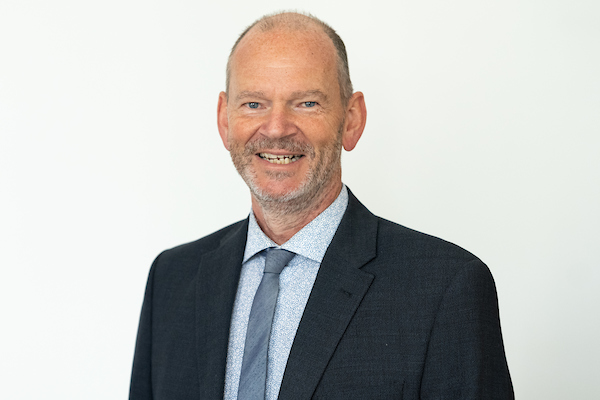
Former Ffynone House School HeadTeacher, Mr Michael Boulding
