= Alan Ford (actor) =

English actor

- Born: 23 February 1938 (age 88); Camberwell, London, England
- Education: East 15 Acting School
- Occupation: Actor
- Years active: 1973–present

Alan Ford (born 23 February 1938) is an English actor. He is best known for his roles in Guy Ritchie gangster movies Snatch and Lock, Stock and Two Smoking Barrels, and for appearing as separate characters in eight episodes of The Bill.

== Early life ==
Ford was born on 23 February 1938 in Camberwell, South London, the eldest son of a seamstress and a taxi driver, and grew up in Elephant and Castle. He left school at the age of 15 and took on various jobs, ending with two years of national service in the Royal Army Ordnance Corps.

== Studies and training ==
Ford's first role was as one of the firemen in Fahrenheit 451. He then secured a place at East 15 Acting School. For three years he studied drama in all its forms: Shakespeare, Chekhov, restoration, commedia dell'arte, pantomime, music, dance, fencing, Stanislavski and improvisation. One of his tutors was Mike Leigh.

== Acting career ==
Ford has appeared on stage at the National Theatre, Royal Court Theatre, the Theatre Royal Stratford East and many repertory theatres.

Ford appeared in Exorcist: The Beginning and, much earlier, as Roosta in the original radio version of The Hitchhiker's Guide to the Galaxy, along with a small speaking role in The Long Good Friday.

Ford played Clifford Harding in G.F. Newman's Law & Order in 1978, then had a brief role in the film An American Werewolf in London, where he plays the taxi driver who says the line, "It puts you in mind of the days of the old demon barber of Fleet Street, doesn't it?" in response to the recent wave of murders around London. He has also proven himself a comic actor. He was involved in the Armando Iannucci production Knowing Me, Knowing You with Alan Partridge, playing a boxing promoter called Terry Norton; and he worked again with Iannucci playing the 'East End Thug' in The Armando Iannucci Shows. He later appeared as a priest in every episode of Snuff Box. In 2015, he played former Thotch band manager 'Big' Basil Steel in Brian Pern: 45 Years of Prog & Roll.

In 1998, Ford narrated and appeared in the Guy Ritchie directed crime comedy Lock, Stock and Two Smoking Barrels, and, in 2000, he appeared as the crime boss 'Brick Top' in Ritchie's film Snatch.

In 2003, Ford provided the voice of Goliath in the British version of JoJo's Circus.

Ford was featured in the 2010 music video "For He's a Jolly Good Felon" by Lostprophets.

In 2011 he starred as crime boss 'Carter' in the film noir Jack Falls alongside his Lock, Stock co-stars Jason Flemyng and Dexter Fletcher, while in 2014, he was cast in the crime thriller Two Days in the Smoke alongside fellow Lock, Stock actor Stephen Marcus.

In 2013 Ford had a guest role in the Norwegian-American TV show Lilyhammer as crime family boss 'Uncle Terry'.

In 2018, Ford appeared in a primary supporting role as Dale Jacobs in the psychological thriller Winter Ridge.

It was announced in November 2023 that Ford was to be cast in EastEnders as Billy Mitchell's (Perry Fenwick) father Stevie Mitchell. The character first appeared for the funeral of the character Aunt Sal (Anna Karen).

== Writer ==
In 2006, Ford published his novel Thin Ice. He said the book "evolved from a collection of anecdotes and actors' tales."

== In music ==
Ford's voice is featured in the dubstep song "Cockney Thug" by Rusko, "Well 'Ard" by Caspa and The Others, "Crunch" by Flux Pavilion and Datsik, "Damien" by Modestep & Funtcase, the death metal song "A Child Is Missing" from the Illdisposed album The Prestige and the hip-hop song "Sinister" by Aesop Rock, Vast Aire and Yeshua from the 2001 Centrifugal Phorce compilation Euphony.

== Personal life ==
Ford has been a vegetarian since 1973.

== Filmography ==
=== Film ===
Year	Film	Role	Notes
1977	The Squeeze	Taff	
1980	The Long Good Friday	Jack	
1981	Venom	Peters	
1981	An American Werewolf in London	Taxi Driver	
1991	Buddy's Song	Phil	
1992	Chaplin	Warder	
1998	Lock, Stock and Two Smoking Barrels	Alan/Narrator	
2000	Snatch	Brick Top	
2000	Furry Story	Fredglob (voice)	
2002	The Great Dome Robbery	Narrator	
2004	Exorcist: The Beginning	Jefferies	
2008	NightDragon	Hansen	
2009	Dead Man Running	Sol	
2010	Mission London	Sibling	
2010	The Ballad of Mulla and Mullins	Johnson	Short Film
2012	The Sweeney	Harry	
2012	Cockneys vs Zombies	Ray Macguire	
2012	Airborne	Max	
2012	Strippers vs Werewolves	Harry	
2011	Lethal	Simon	post-production
2011	Jack Falls	Carter	
2013	The Hundred-Year-Old Man Who Climbed Out the Window and Disappeared	Pim	
2014	Two Days in the Smoke	Jack	
2014	Undercover	Himself	
2015	Skin Traffik	Paul Hamilton	
2016	Alice, Through the Looking	The Chairman	
2018	Winter Ridge	Dale Jacobs	
2018	Gamble	Narrator	
2019	Riot Club	Eddie Beaumont	Short
2022	The Kicked Dog	Alan	Short
2026	The Broken Arrow	Daniel Stone	
TBA	Killing Time	Doris	Filming
TBA	The Plot	Ted	Pre Production

=== Television ===
Year	TV Show	Role	Notes
2024	EastEnders	Stevie Mitchell	Recurring role
2020	The Kemps: All True	Alan Ford	Television film
2017-2019	Thunderbirds Are Go	Light Fingered Fred	2 episodes
2015	Unforgotten	Tommy Pinion	Episode: "Episode 3"
2015	Toast of London	Alan the Fear Therapist	Episode: "Over the Moon"
2014	Toast of London	Alan the Homeopath	Episode: "Fool in Love"
2014	Undercover	Himself	Episode #4.9
2013-2014	Lilyhammer	Terence	5 episodes
2013	Toast of London	Mick Carriage	Episode: "Vanity Project"
2011	Casualty	Norman Danvers	Episode: "Partners"
2010	Hotel Trubble	Delgado	Episode: "Hello Dolly"
2009	My Almost Famous Family	Terry	2 episodes
2009	Doctors	George Swade	Episode: "Mr Jelly"
2009	The Legend of Dick and Dom	King of Kong	Episode: "Rock Hard"
2008	Hotel Babylon	Terry McCaffrey	Episode #3.5
2008	Casualty	Tony Tillings	Episode: "Thicker Than Water"
2007	The Real Outlaws	Himself – Presenter	
2006	The Bill	Davey Rolfe	Episode: "Get on Your Bike"
2006	Jane Hall	Dougie Stringer	Episode: Episode No.1.1
2006	Snuff Box	Rick – Priest	5 episodes
2004	Passer By	Publican	Television film
2004	Keen Eddie	Longfellow	Episode: "Sticky Fingers"
2004	The Bill	George Dooley	Episode: "Devastation and Remorse"
2003	Waking the Dead	Jack Ely	"Walking on Water" (Parts 1 & 2)
2003	William and Mary	Taxi Driver	Episode #1.1
2001	The Armando Iannucci Shows	East End Thug	4 episodes
2000	Hero to Zero	Ron Warley	5 episodes
1998	Mosley	Prison Officer	Episode: "Beyond the Pale"
1998	An Unsuitable Job for a Woman	City Receptionist (uncredited)	Episode: "A Last Embrace"
1997	The Bill	Jimmy Robson	Episode: "Joker"
1997	The Knock	Robbie Reynolds	Episode #3.7
1996	London Bridge	Ron	Episode #1.15
1996	No Bananas	Bernie Silver	2 episodes
1996	Madson	Adrian	Episode #1.2
1994	The Bill	Eric	Episode: "Ducking and Diving"
1994	Knowing Me, Knowing You with Alan Partridge	Terry Norton	Episode: "Show 5"
1994	Little Napoleons	Gerald Nowell	Episode: "The Big Interview"
1994	Class Act	Geoff the Builder	2 episodes
1994	Murder Most Horrid	First villain	Episode: "Smashing Bird"
1994	Minder	Bennett	Episode: "Bring Me the Head of Arthur Daley"
1994	Love Hurts	Punter	Episode: "The Parent Trap"
1993	The Upper Hand	Barman	Episode: "Minder"
1992	The Bill	Maydell	Episode: "On the Record, Off the Record"
1992	The Darling Buds of May	Danvers	Episode: "Oh! To Be in England: Part 1"
1991	The New Statesman	Police Inspector	Episode: "Keeping Mum"
1990	The Bill	Frank Litton	Episode: "Old Wounds"
1990	Grange Hill	Mr Ratcliffe	3 episodes
1989	The Bill	Harry	Episode: "Just for the Crack"
1989	Birds of a Feather	Prison Officer	2 episodes
1988	Bergerac	Sammy Kline	Episode: "Private Fight"
1987	Rockliffe's Babies	Tommy	Episode: "It's All Happening"
1986	C.A.T.S. Eyes	Taxi Driver	Episode: "Tranmere Dan and Tokyo Joe"
1986	Running Scared	Ron Martin	5 episodes
1986	The Best Years of Your Life	Father	Television film
1985	The Bill	Tony Kemp	Episode: "Home Beat"
1985	Summer Season	Harold	Episode: "Rachel and the Roarettes"
1983	Keep It in the Family	Van driver	Episode: "A Touch of the Orient"
1983	Give Us a Break	Nobby Wilson	4 episodes
1982	BBC2 Playhouse	Actor	Episode: "Jake's End"
1981–1982	The Chinese Detective	Jack Arthur Bross	2 episodes
1981	Maybury	Mr Clegg	Episode: "Maisie and Mac"
1981	Smuggler	Giles Sawney	"The Respectable Traitor" (Parts 1 & 2)
1980	Strangers	Johnny James	Episode: "Clowns Don't Cry"
1980	Play for Today	Mr. Chancer	"The Adventures of Frank: Everybody's Fiddling Something" / "The Adventures of Frank: Seeds of Ice"
1979	Play for Today	Police sergeant	Episode: "Waterloo Sunset"
1978	Armchair Thriller	Bill	Episode: "The Limbo Connection: Part 1"
1978	Law & Order	Clifford Harding	3 episodes
1976	Softly, Softly: Task Force	Micky Dixon	Episode: "Say It with Flowers"
1974–1975	Romany Jones	Ken	5 episodes
1973	Softly, Softly: Task Force	Tommy Buckley	Episode: "Slip of the Tongue"
