= Perry Bhandal =

British filmmaker

- Born: 12 January 1968 (age 58); Taplow, UK
- Education: University of Manchester
- Occupations: Film director, screenwriter, producer, author
- Years active: 2012–present
- Notable work: Interview with a Hitman, The Last Boy, Okay, It’s Time to Go

Perry Bhandal (born 12 January 1968) is a British film director, screenwriter, producer, and author. He is known for the films Interview with a Hitman, The Last Boy, and the generatively produced feature film Okay, It’s Time to Go. He is also the author of _prelude, a collection of short stories and artwork, and The Winter Man, a crime thriller novel.

== Early life ==
Bhandal was born in Taplow, England, and is of Sikh heritage. He received a BSc from the University of Manchester, followed by M.A. degrees in film and creative writing from Brunel University.

== Career ==
In May 2009, Bhandal founded the film production company Kirlian Pictures and began developing his debut feature, Interview with a Hitman.

He shot the film in 18 days in August 2011 on location in Newcastle and Bucharest. It had its market premiere at the Cannes Film Festival in May 2012 and was later released theatrically in the UK on 20 July 2012, and in the US on 5 March 2013.

Bhandal directed his second feature, the Rumi-inspired science fiction fantasy thriller The Last Boy, in 2017. The film was released in 2019.

In 2024, Bhandal wrote, directed and produced Okay, It’s Time to Go, an initial dystopian film project created using generative tools. The work explores the societal consequences of a fictional consumer suicide device known as the “Stopwatch”, examining themes including personal autonomy, population collapse, technology, corporate power and the ethics of choice.

The project was later substantially reworked and expanded into a 2026 feature-length dystopian anthology film, structured around three connected stories set in the world of AltarCorp and the Stopwatch. The completed feature, listed by Kirlian Pictures as running 1 hr 51 min, was released for direct streaming through Bhandal’s Kirlian Pictures platform."Okay, It's Time to Go". Kirlian Pictures.

In May 2025, Bhandal was featured in a Franceinfo article on the growing use of generative technology in auteur cinema at the Cannes Film Festival. Describing his work on the series, he said: “If I want to use special effects that would cost $10 million to make, I can now.” Reflecting on his creative process, Bhandal drew a comparison with George Lucas's approach to character design on Revenge of the Sith, noting: “I do the same, but with a simple computer.” Bhandal has described generative tools as “the most powerful equaliser in cinema history”, highlighting their role in enabling independent filmmakers to create work that previously would have required significant budgets and large teams.

== Publications ==
- _prelude – a collection of short stories and artwork (2020), ISBN 978-1-9831-3734-1
- The Winter Man – a crime thriller novel (2020), ISBN 978-1-5272-5946-1

== Filmography ==
=== Feature films ===
| Year | Title | Credited as | | |
| Year | Title | Director | Screenwriter | Producer |
|---|---|---|---|---|
| 2012 | Interview with a Hitman | Yes | Yes | Yes |
| 2019 | The Last Boy | Yes | Yes | Yes |
| 2026 | Okay, It’s Time to Go | Yes | Yes | Yes |
