= Index of Windows games (A) =

This is an index of Microsoft Windows games.

This list has been split into multiple pages. Please use the Table of Contents to browse it.

Title	Released	Developer	Publisher
A-10 Cuba!	1996	Parsoft Interactive	Activision
The A-Files	1998	Gyldendal	Gyldendal
A-Men 2	2015	Bloober Team	Bloober Team
A.D. 2044	1996	LK Avalon	LK Avalon
A.R.E.S.: Extinction Agenda	2010	Extend Studio	Origo Games, Aksys Games
A Game of Thrones: Genesis	2011	Cyanide	Focus Home Interactive
A New Beginning	2010	Daedalic Entertainment	Deep Silver
A Virus Named TOM	2012	Misfits Attic	Misfits Attic
AaAaAA!!! – A Reckless Disregard for Gravity	2009	Dejobaan Games	Dejobaan Games
Aaero	2017	Mad Fellows	Mad Fellows
Aarklash: Legacy	2013	Cyanide	Bigben Interactive
Abandon Ship	2018	Fireblade Software	Plug In Digital
ABC Sports Indy Racing	1997	Shot Sports Software	ABC Interactive
Abomination: The Nemesis Project	1999	Hothouse Creations	Eidos Interactive
Absolute Drift	2015	Funselektor Labs	Funselektor Labs
Absolver	2017	Sloclap	Devolver Digital
Abyss Odyssey	2014	ACE Team	Sega
The Abyss: Incident at Europa	1998	Sound Source Interactive	Sound Source Interactive
Abzû	2016	Giant Squid	505 Games
The Academy: The First Riddle	2020	Pine Studios	Snapbreak Games
Acceleration of Suguri X Edition	2011	Orange Juice	Rockin' Android
Accounting	2016	Crows Crows Crows, Squanch Games	Crows Crows Crows
Ace Combat: Assault Horizon	2013	Project Aces	Bandai Namco Games
Ace Combat 7: Skies Unknown	2019	Bandai Namco Studios	Bandai Namco Entertainment
Ace of Spades	2012	Jagex	Jagex
Ace Online	2006	MasangSoft	Yedang
Ace Ventura: The CD-Rom Game	1996	7th Level	Bomico Entertainment Software
Aces of the Galaxy	2008	Artech Studios	Sierra Online
Achilles: Legends Untold	2023	Dark Point Games	Dark Point Games
Achron	2011	Hazardous Software, Inc.	Hazardous Software, Inc.
Achtung Panzer: Kharkov 1943	2010	Graviteam	Paradox Interactive, Mamba Games
Achtung Spitfire!	1997	Big Time Software	Avalon Hill
Achtung! Cthulhu Tactics	2018	Auroch Digital	Ripstone Games
Act of Aggression	2015	Eugen Systems	Focus Home Interactive
Act of War: Direct Action	2005	Eugen Systems	Atari
Act of War: High Treason	2006	Eugen Systems	Atari
Action Half-Life	1999	The A-Team	
Action Quake 2	1998	The A-Team	
Active Worlds	1995	ActiveWorlds, Inc.	
Activision Anthology	2003	MacPlay	Activision
Actua Golf 2	1998	Gremlin Interactive	Gremlin Interactive, Fox Interactive
Actua Pool	1999	Gremlin Interactive	Gremlin Interactive
Actua Soccer 2	1998	Gremlin Interactive	Gremlin Interactive, Fox Interactive
Ad Infinitum	2023	Hekate	Nacon
Addiction Pinball	1998	Team17	Microprose
Adidas Power Soccer	1997	Psygnosis	Psygnosis
Adidas Power Soccer 98	1998	Shen Technologies SARL	Psygnosis
Adrenix	1998	Digital Dialect	Playmates Interactive
Adrift	2015	Three One Zero	505 Games
Advent Rising	2005	GlyphX Games	Majesco
Adventure at the Chateau d'Or	2001	Karma Labs	Karma Labs
Adventure Pinball: Forgotten Island	2001	Digital Extremes	Electronic Arts
Adventure Time: Explore the Dungeon Because I Don't Know!	2013	WayForward Technologies	D3 Publisher, Namco Bandai Games
Adventure Time: Finn & Jake Investigations	2015	Vicious Cycle Software	Little Orbit
Adventure Time: Pirates of the Enchiridion	2018	Climax Studios	Outright Games
Adventure Time: The Secret of the Nameless Kingdom	2014	WayForward Technologies	Little Orbit, Namco Bandai Games
The Adventures of Fatman	2003	Socko! Entertainment	Socko! Entertainment
The Adventures of Lomax	1997	Psygnosis	Psygnosis
Adventures of Pip	2015	TicToc Games	TicToc Games
The Adventures of Shuggy	2012	Smudged Cat Games	Valcon Games
AdvertCity	2015	VoxelStorm	VoxelStorm
Aegis Defenders	2018	Guts Department	Humble Bundle
Aegis of Earth: Protonovus Assault	2016	Acquire	Acquire, PQube, Aksys Games
Aer: Memories of Old	2017	Forgotten Key	Daedalic Entertainment
Aeterna Noctis	2021	Aeternum Game Studios	Aeternum Game Studios
AEW Fight Forever	2023	Yuke's	THQ Nordic
Afghanistan '11	2017	Every Single Soldier	Slitherine Software
AFL Evolution	2017	Wicked Witch	Tru Blu Entertainment
AFL Live	2010	Big Ant Studios	Tru Blu Entertainment
Africa Trail	1995	MECC	The Learning Company
Afro Samurai 2	2015	Redacted Studios	Versus Evil
After Us	2023	Piccolo Studio	Private Division
After...	2003	Ciel	Ciel
Afterfall: Insanity	2011	Intoxicate Studios	Nicolas Entertainment Group
Afterfall: Reconquest	2015	Intoxicate Studios	Nicolas Entertainment Group
Afterglitch	2022	Hangonit	Hangonit Studio
Afterlife	1996	LucasArts	LucasArts
Afterparty	2019	Night School Studio	Night School Studio
Against the Storm	2023	Eremite Games	Hooded Horse
Agatha Christie: And Then There Were None	2005	AWE Productions	The Adventure Company
Agatha Christie: Evil Under the Sun	2007	AWE Productions	The Adventure Company
Agatha Christie: Murder on the Orient Express	2006	AWE Productions	The Adventure Company
Agatha Christie: The ABC Murders	2016	Artefacts Studio	Anuman, Kalypso
Agatha Knife	2017	Mango Protocol	Mango Protocol
Age of Booty	2008	Certain Affinity	Capcom
Age of Chivalry	2007	Team Chivalry	
Age of Conan	2008	Funcom	Funcom
The Age of Decadence	2015	Iron Tower Studio	Iron Tower Studi
Age of Empires	1997	Ensemble Studios	Microsoft Game Studios
Age of Empires: The Rise of Rome	1998	Ensemble Studios	Microsoft
Age of Empires II	1999	Ensemble Studios	Microsoft Game Studios
Age of Empires II: The Conquerors	2000	Ensemble Studios	Microsoft Game Studios
Age of Empires III	2005	Ensemble Studios	Microsoft Game Studios
Age of Empires III: The Asian Dynasties	2007	Ensemble Studios, Big Huge Games	Microsoft Game Studios
Age of Empires III: The WarChiefs	2006	Ensemble Studios	Microsoft Game Studios
Age of Empires IV	2021	Relic Entertainment, World's Edge	Xbox Game Studios
Age of Mythology	2002	Ensemble Studios	Microsoft Game Studios
Age of Mythology: The Titans	2003	Ensemble Studios	Microsoft Game Studios
Age of Pirates: Caribbean Tales	2006	Akella	1C Company, Playlogic Entertainment
Age of Pirates 2: City of Abandoned Ships	2009	Akella	Playlogic Entertainment
Age of Sail	1996	TalonSoft	TalonSoft
Age of Sail II	2001	Akella	TalonSoft
Age of Wanderer	2003	Joymax	OSC
Age of Wonders	1999	Triumph Studios	Gathering of Developers
Age of Wonders: Planetfall	2019	Triumph Studios	Paradox Interactive
Age of Wonders: Shadow Magic	2003	Triumph Studios	Gathering of Developers
Age of Wonders II: The Wizard's Throne	2002	Triumph Studios	Take 2
Age of Wonders III	2014	Triumph Studios	Triumph Studios
Age of Wonders 4	2023	Triumph Studios	Paradox Interactive
The Agency: Cover Ops	2010	Sony Online Entertainment	Sony Online Entertainment
Agent A: A Puzzle in Disguise	2019	Yak & Co	Yak & Co
Agent Armstrong	1999	King of the Jungle	Virgin Interactive
Agents of Mayhem	2017	Volition	Deep Silver
AGEOD's American Civil War	2007	AGEOD	Matrix Games
Ageod's Wars of Succession	2018	AGEOD	Slitherine Ltd
Agharta: The Hollow Earth	2000	Aniware AB	Egmont Interactive
Agile Warrior F-111X	1996	Black Ops Entertainment	Virgin Interactive Entertainment
Agony	2018	Madmind Studio	PlayWay
Ai Space	2008	Ai Space Production Committee	Ai Space Production Committee
AI War: Fleet Command	2009	Arcen Games	Arcen Games
Aimlabs	2023	State Space Labs, Inc.	State Space Labs, Inc.
Aion	2008	NCsoft	NCsoft
Air Assault Task Force	2006	ProSIM Company	Shrapnel Games
Air Conflicts	2006	3Division Entertainment	Frogster Interactive
Air Conflicts: Pacific Carriers	2012	Games Farm	Maximum Games, bitComposer Games
Air Conflicts: Secret Wars	2011	Games Farm	bitComposer Games, Kalypso Media
Air Conflicts: Vietnam	2013	Games Farm	BitComposer Entertainment
Air Twister	2023	YS Net	YS Net
Airborne Assault: Highway to the Reich	2003	Panther Games	Matrix Games
Airborne Kingdom	2020	The Wandering Band	The Wandering Band
Airfix Dogfighter	2000	Unique Development Studios	EON Digital Entertainment
An Airport for Aliens Currently Run by Dogs	2021	Strange Scaffold	Strange Scaffold
Airport Mania: First Flight	2008	Reflexive Entertainment	Reflexive Entertainment
Airport Simulator 2019	2018	Toplitz Productions	Toplitz Productions
Airport Tycoon	2000	Krisalis Software	TalonSoft, Global Star Software
Airscape: The Fall of Gravity	2015	Cross-Product	EQ Games
Akatsuki Blitzkampf	2007	Subtle Style	Subtle Style
Akiba Girls	2003	G.J?	G.J?
Akka Arrh	2023	Llamasoft	Atari
Al Emmo and the Lost Dutchman's Mine	2006	Himalaya Studios	Himalaya Studios
Alan Wake	2012	Remedy Entertainment, Nitro Games	Legacy Interactive
Alan Wake 2	2023	Remedy Entertainment	Epic Games Publishing
Alan Wake's American Nightmare	2012	Remedy Entertainment, Nitro Games	Remedy Entertainment
Alba: A Wildlife Adventure	2020	Ustwo Games	Ustwo Games
Alcatraz: Prison Escape	2001	Zombie Inc.	Activision Value
Alekhine's Gun	2016	Maximum Games	Maximum Games
Alexander	2004	GSC Game World	Ubisoft
Alfa Romeo Racing Italiano	2005	Milestone srl	Valcon Games
Alfred Hitchcock – Vertigo	2021	Pendulo Studios	Microids
Alias	2004	Acclaim Cheltenham	Acclaim Entertainment
Alice in Wonderland	2010	Étranges Libellules	Disney Interactive Studios
Alice: Madness Returns	2011	Spicy Horse	Electronic Arts
Alien Breed 2: Assault	2010	Team17	Team17
Alien Breed 3: Descent	2010	Team17	Team17
Alien Breed Evolution	2010	Team17	Team17
Alien Earth	1998	Beam Software	Playmates Interactive
Alien Rage	2013	CI Games	CI Games
Alien Shooter	2003	Sigma Team	Sigma Team
Alien Shooter: Vengeance	2007	Sigma Team	Sigma Team
Alien Spidy	2013	Enigma Software Productions	Kalypso Media
Alien Swarm	2010	Valve	Valve
Alien: Isolation	2014	Creative Assembly	Sega
Aliens Versus Predator	1999	Rebellion Developments	Fox Interactive
Aliens Versus Predator 2	2001	Third Law Entertainment	Sierra Entertainment
Aliens vs. Predator	2010	Rebellion Developments	Sega
Aliens: Colonial Marines	2010	Gearbox Software	Sega
Aliens: Dark Descent	2023	Tindalos Interactive	Focus Entertainment
Aliens: Fireteam Elite	2021	Cold Iron Studios	Cold Iron Studios
All Walls Must Fall	2018	Inbetweengames	Inbetweengames
Allegiance	2000	Microsoft Research	Microsoft
Alliance of Valiant Arms	2007	Red Duck	Neowiz, NHN USA
Allied General	1995	Strategic Simulations	Strategic Simulations
The Almost Gone	2020	Happy Volcano	Playdigious
Alone in the Dark (2008 video game)	2008	Eden Games	Atari
Alone in the Dark (2024 video game)	2024	Pieces Interactive	THQ Nordic
Alone in the Dark 3	1995	Infogrames Multimedia	Infogrames Multimedia
Alone in the Dark: Illumination	2015	Pure FPS	Atari SA
Alone in the Dark: The New Nightmare	2001	Darkworks	Infogrames
Alpha Black Zero: Intrepid Protocol	2004	Khaeon	Playlogic
Alpha Polaris	2011	Turmoil Games	Just a Game
Alpha Prime	2006	Black Element Software	Idea Games, Meridian4
Alpha Protocol	2009	Obsidian Entertainment	Sega
Alter Ego	2010	Future Games	Viva Media
Alternativa	2010	Centauri Production, First Reality	Bohemia Interactive
Alvin and the Chipmunks	2007	Sensory Sweep Studios	Brash Entertainment
Always Sometimes Monsters	2014	Vagabond Dog	Devolver Digital
The Amazing Spider-Man	2012	Beenox	Activision
The Amazing Spider-Man 2	2014	Beenox	Activision
The Amazon Trail	1996	MECC	MECC
Amazon Trail 3rd Edition	1998	MECC	The Learning Company
Amazon Trail II	1996	MECC	MECC
Amber: Journeys Beyond	1996	Hue Forest Entertainment	Hue Forest Entertainment
Amber Isle	2024	Ambertail Games	Team17
American Conquest	2003	GSC Game World	CDV
American McGee's Alice	2000	Rogue Entertainment	Electronic Arts
American McGee's Grimm	2008	Spicy Horse	Turner Broadcasting System
American Truck Simulator	2016	SCS Software	SCS Software
Amerzone	1999	Microids	Casterman
Amid Evil	2019	Indefatigable	New Blood Interactive
Amnesia: A Machine for Pigs	2013	The Chinese Room	Frictional Games
Amnesia: Rebirth	2020	Frictional Games	Frictional Games
Amnesia: The Bunker	2023	Frictional Games	Frictional Games
Amnesia: The Dark Descent	2010	Frictional Games	Frictional Games
Amok	1996	Lemon	Scavenger, Koei, Tec Toy
Among the Sleep	2014	Krillbite Studio	Krillbite Studio
Anachronox	2001	Ion Storm	Eidos Interactive, Infogrames
Anarchy Online	2001	Funcom	Funcom
Ancestors: The Humankind Odyssey	2019	Panache Digital Games	Private Division
Ancient Wars: Sparta	2007	World Forge	Play Ten Interactive
And Yet It Moves	2009	Broken Rules	Broken Rules
Angels in the Court	1999	Pinpai	Pink Pineapple
Angels Online	2006	UserJoy Technology	Q Entertainment
Angry Birds 2	2019	Rovio Entertainment	Rovio Entertainment
Angry Birds Friends	2019	Rovio Entertainment	Rovio Entertainment
Angry Birds Rio	2011	Rovio Entertainment	Rovio Entertainment
Angry Birds Seasons	2011	Rovio Entertainment	Rovio Entertainment
Animamundi: Dark Alchemist	2004	Karin Entertainment	Hirameki International
Animaniacs Game Pack	1997	Funnybone Entertainment	Warner Bros. Interactive
Ankh	2005	Deck13 Interactive	BHV Software
Ankh: Heart of Osiris	2006	Deck13 Interactive	BHV Software
Anna	2012	Dreampainters Software	Kalypso Media
Anno 1404	2009	Related Designs	Ubisoft
Anno 1503	2003	Max Design	Sunflowers
Anno 1602	1998	Max Design	Sunflowers
Anno 1701	2006	Related Designs	Sunflowers
Anno 2070	2011	Related Designs	Ubisoft
Anodyne	2013	Analgesic Productions	Analgesic Productions
Anomaly: Warzone Earth	2011	11 Bit Studios	11 Bit Studios
The Ant Bully	2006	Artificial Mind and Movement	Midway Games
Ant War	2003	Anarchy Enterprises	Anarchy Enterprises
Antichamber	2013	Demruth	Demruth
Antigraviator	2018	Cybernetic Walrus	Iceberg Interactive
Antihero	2017	Tim Conkling	Versus Evil
Antinomy of Common Flowers	2017	Twilight Frontier, Team Shanghai Alice	Twilight Frontier, Team Shanghai Alice
Anubis II	2005	Data Design Interactive	Metro 3D, Conspiracy Entertainment
Apache: Air Assault	2010	Gaijin Entertainment	Activision
APB: All Points Bulletin	2010	Realtime Worlds	EA Games
Aperture Desk Job	2022	Valve	Valve
Aperture Hand Lab	2019	Cloudhead Games	Valve
Aperture Tag	2014	Aperture Tag Team	Aperture Tag Team
Apex Legends	2019	Respawn Entertainment	Electronic Arts
Apocalipsis	2018	Punch Punk Games	Klabater
Aporia: Beyond the Valley	2017	Investigate North	Green Man Gaming
APOX	2011	BlueGiant Interactive	BlueGiant Interactive
Apprentice	2003	Herculean Effort Productions	Herculean Effort Productions
AquaNox	2001	Massive Development	Ravensburger
Aquaria	2007	Bit Blot	Bit Blot
Aquatico	2023	Digital Reef Games	Overseer Games
Ara: History Untold	2024	Oxide Games	Xbox Game Studios
Arabian Nights	2001	Silmarils	Visiware, Wanadoo Edition
Aragami	2016	Lince Works	Merge Games, Maximum Games
Araya	2016	MAD Virtual Reality Studio	MAD Virtual Reality Studio
Arcanum: Of Steamworks and Magick Obscura	2001	Troika Games	Sierra Entertainment
ArchLord	2005	NHN Games	Codemasters Online Gaming, Webzen
Arcomage	1999	New World Computing	3DO
Area 51	September 30, 1996	Mesa Logic	Midway
Area 51 (2005 video game)	2005	Midway Austin	Midway
Ark: Survival Ascended	2024	Studio Wildcard	Snail Games
Ark: Survival Evolved	2017	Studio Wildcard	Studio Wildcard
Arkadian Warriors	2007	Wanako Games	Sierra Online
Arkham Horror: Mother's Embrace	2021	Artefacts Studio	Asmodee Digital
Arma 2	2009	Bohemia Interactive Studio	505 Games
Arma 2: Operation Arrowhead	2010	Bohemia Interactive Studio	505 Games, Meridian4
Arma 3	2013	Bohemia Interactive Studio	Bohemia Interactive Studio
Arma: Armed Assault	2006	Bohemia Interactive Studio	505 Games
Arma: Queen's Gambit	2007	Bohemia Interactive Studio, Black Element Software	505 Games
Armada 2526	2009	Ntronium Games	Tri Synergy, Iceberg Interactive
Armadillo Run	2006	Peter Stock	
Armageddon Empires	2007	Cryptic Comet	Cryptic Comet
Armed and Dangerous	2003	Planet Moon Studios	LucasArts
Armello	2015	League of Geeks	League of Geeks
Armies of Exigo	2004	Black Hole Entertainment	Electronic Arts
Armored Core VI: Fires of Rubicon	2023	FromSoftware	Bandai Namco Entertainment
Army Men	1998	3DO	3DO
Army Men II	1999	3DO	3DO
Army Men: Air Attack	2001	3DO	3DO
Army Men: Air Tactics	2000	3DO	3DO
Army Men: RTS	2002	Pandemic Studios	3DO
Army Men: Sarge's Heroes	2000	3DO	3DO
Army Men: Sarge's War	2004	Global Star Software	Global Star Software
Army Men: Toys in Space	1999	3DO	3DO
Army Men: World War	2000	3DO	3DO
Arrest of a Stone Buddha	2020	Yeo	Yeo
Arsenal of Democracy	2010	BL-Logic	Paradox Interactive
Art of Murder: Cards of Destiny	2010	City Interactive	City Interactive
Art of Murder: FBI Confidential	2008	City Interactive	City Interactive
Art of Murder: Hunt for the Puppeteer	2009	City Interactive	City Interactive
Arthur and the Invisibles	2007	Etranges Libellules	Atari
Arthur's Knights	2000	Dreamcatcher Interactive	Cryo Interactive, DreamCatcher Interactive
Arthur's Knights II: The Secret of Merlin	2001	Cryo Interactive	Wanadoo Edition
Arx Fatalis	2002	Arkane Studios	JoWooD
As Dusk Falls	2022	Interior Night	Xbox Game Studios
Ascension to the Throne	2007	DVS	1C Publishing
The Ascent	2021	Neon Giant	Curve Digital
Asda Story	2008	MaxOn Soft Corp	gamescampus.com
Asghan: The Dragon Slayer	1998	Silmarils	Grolier Interactive, Ubi Soft
Ashen	2018	A44	Annapurna Interactive
Asheron's Call	1999	Turbine Entertainment Software	Microsoft, Turbine Entertainment Software
Asheron's Call 2: Fallen Kings	2002	Turbine Entertainment Software	Turbine Entertainment Software
Ashes Cricket 2009	2009	Transmission Games	Codemasters, Atari
Ashes Cricket 2013	2013	Trickstar Games	505 Games
Ashes of the Singularity	2016	Oxide Games, Stardock Entertainment	Stardock Entertainment
Assassin's Creed	2008	Ubisoft Montreal	Ubisoft
Assassin's Creed II	2009	Ubisoft Montreal	Ubisoft
Assassin's Creed III	2012	Ubisoft Montreal	Ubisoft
Assassin's Creed III: Liberation	2014	Ubisoft Sofia	Ubisoft
Assassin's Creed IV: Black Flag	2013	Ubisoft Montreal	Ubisoft
Assassin's Creed Chronicles	2016	Climax Studios	Ubisoft
Assassin's Creed Freedom Cry	2014	Ubisoft Quebec	Ubisoft
Assassin's Creed Mirage	2023	Ubisoft Bordeaux	Ubisoft
Assassin's Creed Odyssey	2018	Ubisoft Quebec	Ubisoft
Assassin's Creed Origins	2017	Ubisoft Montreal	Ubisoft
Assassin's Creed: Revelations	2011	Ubisoft Montreal	Ubisoft
Assassin's Creed Rogue	2015	Ubisoft Sofia	Ubisoft
Assassin's Creed Shadows	2024	Ubisoft Quebec	Ubisoft
Assassin's Creed Syndicate	2016	Ubisoft Quebec	Ubisoft
Assassin's Creed Unity	2014	Ubisoft Montreal	Ubisoft
Assassin's Creed Valhalla	2020	Ubisoft Quebec	Ubisoft
Assassin's Creed: Brotherhood	2010	Ubisoft Montreal	Ubisoft
Assault Heroes	2006	Wanako Games	Sierra Online
AssaultCube	2006	Rabid Viper Productions	
Asterigos: Curse of the Stars	2022	Acme Gamestudio	TinyBuild
Asterix & Obelix	1996	Infogrames	Infogrames
Asterix & Obelix XXL	2004	Etranges Libellules	Atari
Asterix & Obelix XXL 2: Mission: Las Vegum	2005	Etranges Libellules	Atari
Asterix at the Olympic Games	2008	Etranges Libellules	Atari
Astonishia Story	2002	Sonnori	Sonnori, Ubisoft
Astral Tournament	2001	Apus Software	Apus Software
Astro Battle	2004	Lava Lord Games	
AstroPop	2004	PopCap Games	PopCap Games
Atari Anniversary Edition	2001	Digital Eclipse	Infogrames
Atari Anthology	2004	Digital Eclipse	Atari
Athens 2004	2004	Eurocom	Sony Computer Entertainment, Eidos Interactive
Atlantica Online	2008	NDOORS Interactive	NDOORS Interactive
Atlantis Evolution	2004	Atlantis Interactive Entertainment	The Adventure Company
Atlantis II	1999	Cryo Interactive	Dreamcatcher Interactive
Atlantis III: The New World	2001	Cryo Interactive	Dreamcatcher Interactive
Atlantis Sky Patrol	2006	Big Fish Studios	Big Fish Games
Atlantis: The Lost Empire – Search for the Journal	2001	Zombie Inc.	Disney Interactive
Atlantis: The Lost Empire – Trial by Fire	2001	Zombie Inc.	Disney Interactive
Atlantis Underwater Tycoon	2003	Activision Value	Activision Value
Atlantis: The Lost Tales	1997	Cryo Interactive	Dreamcatcher Interactive
Atlas Fallen	2023	Deck13 Interactive	Focus Entertainment
Atom RPG	2018	Atom Team	Atom Team
Atomega	2017	Ubisoft Reflections	Ubisoft
Atomic Bomberman	1997	Interplay Entertainment	Interplay Entertainment
Attack of the Earthlings	2018	Team Junkfish	Team Junkfish
Attack on Pearl Harbor	2007	Legendo Entertainment	Legendo Entertainment
Attack on Titan	2016	Omega Force	Koei Tecmo
Attack on Titan 2	2018	Omega Force	Koei Tecmo
Attack Retrieve Capture	1997	Hoopy Entertainment	Hoopy Entertainment
Audiosurf	2008	Dylan Fitterer	Audiosurf, LLC
Auditorium	2012	Cipher Prime	Cipher Prime
Aurion: Legacy of the Kori-Odan	2016	Kiro'o Games	Kiro'o Games
Aurora: The Secret Within	2008	BluMiAl Studios	Lexicon Entertainment
Austin Powers Pinball	2002	Wildfire Studios	Gotham Games
Auto Assault	2006	NetDevil	NCsoft
Auxiliary Power's Demolition Derby and Figure 8 Race	2001	Auxiliary Power, John C. Ardussi	Auxiliary Power
Avadon 2: The Corruption	2013	Spiderweb Software	Spiderweb Software
Avadon 3: The Warborn	2016	Spiderweb Software	Spiderweb Software
Avadon: The Black Fortress	2011	Spiderweb Software	Spiderweb Software
Avalon Hill's Squad Leader	2000	Random Games	Hasbro Interactive
Avatar: Frontiers of Pandora	2023	Massive Entertainment	Ubisoft
Avatar: The Game	2009	Ubisoft Montreal	Ubisoft
Avatar: The Last Airbender	2006	THQ, TOSE	THQ
Aven Colony	2017	Mothership Entertainment	Team17
Avencast: Rise of the Mage	2007	ClockStone	Lighthouse Interactive
Avernum	2000	Spiderweb Software	Spiderweb Software
Avernum: Escape from the Pit	2011	Spiderweb Software	Spiderweb Software
Avernum 2: Crystal Souls	2015	Spiderweb Software	Spiderweb Software
Avowed	2025	Obsidian Entertainment	Xbox Game Studios
Away: The Survival Series	2021	Breaking Walls	Breaking Walls
The Awesome Adventures of Captain Spirit	2018	Dontnod Entertainment	Square Enix
Axiom Verge	2015	Thomas Happ Games	Thomas Happ Games
Axis & Allies (1998 video game)	1998	Hasbro Interactive	Hasbro Interactive
Axis & Allies (2004 video game)	2004	TimeGate Studios	Atari
Ayakashi Ninden Kunoichiban	1997	Shoeisha	Shoeisha
Azada	2007	Big Fish Studios	Big Fish Games
Aztaka	2009	Citeremis	Citeremis
