= List of Nintendo Switch games (A–Am) =

This is part of the list of Nintendo Switch games.

== List ==
There are currently 4133 games across List of Nintendo Switch games (0–9), this page (A–Am), List of Nintendo Switch games (An–Az), List of Nintendo Switch games (B), List of Nintendo Switch games (C–G), List of Nintendo Switch games (H–P), and List of Nintendo Switch games (Q–Z).

List of Nintendo Switch games
| Title | Developer(s) | Publisher(s) | Release date | Ref. |
|---|---|---|---|---|
| A-Kei Otaku | Worker Bee | Worker Bee | January 10, 2019 | |
| A-Train: All Aboard! Tourism | Artdink | Artdink | March 12, 2021 | |
| A-Train de Ikou Hirogaru Kankou Line | Artdink | Artdink | March 11, 2022 | |
| AAA Clock | RedDeerGames | RedDeerGames | October 8, 2021 | |
| AAA Clock 2 | RedDeerGames | RedDeerGames | November 3, 2022 | |
| AAA Clock Gold | ReedDeerGames | RedDeerGames | July 5, 2024 | |
| AAA Pro Clock 2023 | Dezvolt Games | Dezvolt Games | November 7, 2023 | |
| Aaero | Mad Fellows | JP: S2 Entertainment; WW: Mad Fellows | December 24, 2018 | |
| Abarenbo Tengu & Zombie Nation | City Connection | City Connection | October 28, 2021 | |
| Abbie's Farm for Kids and Toddlers | Asylum Square | Asylum Square Interactive | April 1, 2021 | |
| Aborigenus | Drageus Games | Drageus Games | January 10, 2020 | |
| Absolum | Dotemu | Dotemu | October 9, 2025 | |
| Absolute Drift | Funselektor Labs | Funselektor Labs | December 3, 2020 | |
| Abyss | EnjoyUp Games | EnjoyUp Games | December 25, 2018 | |
| Abyss: Backrooms Pool Horror | CGI Lab | CGI Lab | November 21, 2024 | |
| Abyss Memory: Fallen Angel and the Path of Magic | Byking | Byking | April 27, 2022 | |
| Abyss Seeker - What Do You See Deep in the Abyss | Success Corporation | Success Corporation | March 6, 2025 | |
| Abyss: The Wraiths of Eden | Artifex Mundi | Artifex Mundi | January 21, 2021 | |
| Abyss of the Sacrifice | Intense | D3 Publisher | December 17, 2020 | |
| Abzû | Giant Squid Studios | 505 Games | November 29, 2018 | |
| ACA Neo Geo: 3 Count Bout | SNK | Hamster Corporation | October 11, 2018 | |
| ACA Neo Geo: Aero Fighters 2 | Video System | Hamster Corporation | August 3, 2017 | |
| ACA Neo Geo: Aero Fighters 3 | Video System | Hamster Corporation | March 15, 2018 | |
| ACA Neo Geo: Aggressors of Dark Kombat | ADK | Hamster Corporation | September 13, 2018 | |
| ACA Neo Geo: Alpha Mission II | SNK | Hamster Corporation | April 6, 2017 | |
| ACA Neo Geo: Art of Fighting | SNK | Hamster Corporation | September 21, 2017 | |
| ACA Neo Geo: Art of Fighting 2 | SNK | Hamster Corporation | January 11, 2018 | |
| ACA Neo Geo: Art of Fighting 3 | SNK | Hamster Corporation | November 2, 2017 | |
| ACA Neo Geo: Baseball Stars Professional | SNK | Hamster Corporation | May 17, 2018 | |
| ACA Neo Geo: Baseball Stars 2 | SNK | Hamster Corporation | March 21, 2019 | |
| ACA Neo Geo: Big Tournament Golf | Nazca Corporation | Hamster Corporation | March 23, 2017 | |
| ACA Neo Geo: Blazing Star | Yumokobo | Hamster Corporation | May 2, 2017 | |
| ACA Neo Geo: Blue's Journey | Alpha Denshi | Hamster Corporation | September 7, 2017 | |
| ACA Neo Geo: Burning Fight | SNK | Hamster Corporation | September 28, 2017 | |
| ACA Neo Geo: Crossed Swords | Alpha Denshi | Hamster Corporation | August 23, 2018 | |
| ACA Neo Geo: Cyber-Lip | SNK | Hamster Corporation | September 20, 2018 | |
| ACA Neo Geo: Fatal Fury: King of Fighters | SNK | Hamster Corporation | April 20, 2017 | |
| ACA Neo Geo: Fatal Fury 2 | SNK | Hamster Corporation | June 22, 2017 | |
| ACA Neo Geo: Fatal Fury Special | SNK | Hamster Corporation | February 15, 2018 | |
| ACA Neo Geo: Football Frenzy | SNK | Hamster Corporation | August 30, 2018 | |
| ACA Neo Geo: Galaxy Fight: Universal Warriors | Sunsoft | Hamster Corporation | May 18, 2017 | |
| ACA Neo Geo: Garou: Mark of the Wolves | SNK | Hamster Corporation | May 11, 2017 | |
| ACA Neo Geo: Ghost Pilots | SNK | Hamster Corporation | April 26, 2018 | |
| ACA Neo Geo: Gururin | Face | Hamster Corporation | April 12, 2018 | |
| ACA Neo Geo: Karnov's Revenge | Data East | Hamster Corporation | November 16, 2017 | |
| ACA Neo Geo: The King of Fighters '94 | SNK | Hamster Corporation | March 16, 2017 | |
| ACA Neo Geo: The King of Fighters '95 | SNK | Hamster Corporation | October 12, 2017 | |
| ACA Neo Geo: The King of Fighters '96 | SNK | Hamster Corporation | December 28, 2017 | |
| ACA Neo Geo: The King of Fighters '97 | SNK | Hamster Corporation | July 26, 2018 | |
| ACA Neo Geo: The King of Fighters '98 | SNK | Hamster Corporation | March 3, 2017 | |
| ACA Neo Geo: The King of Fighters '99 | SNK | Hamster Corporation | May 25, 2017 | |
| ACA Neo Geo: The King of Fighters 2000 | SNK | Hamster Corporation | August 10, 2017 | |
| ACA Neo Geo: The King of Fighters 2001 | SNK | Hamster Corporation | September 27, 2018 | |
| ACA Neo Geo: The King of Fighters 2002 | Eolith | Hamster Corporation | December 27, 2018 | |
| ACA Neo Geo: The King of Fighters 2003 | Eolith | Hamster Corporation | December 27, 2018 | |
| ACA Neo Geo: King of the Monsters | SNK | Hamster Corporation | January 4, 2018 | |
| ACA Neo Geo: King of the Monsters 2 | SNK | Hamster Corporation | November 22, 2018 | |
| ACA Neo Geo: Kizuna Encounter | SNK | Hamster Corporation | January 10, 2019 | |
| ACA Neo Geo: The Last Blade | SNK | Hamster Corporation | December 14, 2017 | |
| ACA Neo Geo: The Last Blade 2 | SNK | Hamster Corporation | June 21, 2018 | |
| ACA Neo Geo: Last Resort | SNK | Hamster Corporation | June 1, 2017 | |
| ACA Neo Geo: League Bowling | SNK | Hamster Corporation | July 19, 2018 | |
| ACA Neo Geo: Magical Drop II | Data East | Hamster Corporation | June 29, 2017 | |
| ACA Neo Geo: Magical Drop III | Data East | Hamster Corporation | February 22, 2018 | |
| ACA Neo Geo: Magician Lord | Alpha Denshi | Hamster Corporation | August 17, 2017 | |
| ACA Neo Geo: Metal Slug | Nazca Corporation | Hamster Corporation | March 30, 2017 | |
| ACA Neo Geo: Metal Slug 2 | SNK | Hamster Corporation | July 6, 2017 | |
| ACA Neo Geo: Metal Slug 3 | SNK | Hamster Corporation | March 3, 2017 | |
| ACA Neo Geo: Metal Slug 4 | Playmore | Hamster Corporation | August 9, 2018 | |
| ACA Neo Geo: Metal Slug 5 | SNK Playmore | Hamster Corporation | December 13, 2018 | |
| ACA Neo Geo: Metal Slug X | SNK | Hamster Corporation | October 5, 2017 | |
| ACA Neo Geo: Money Puzzle Exchanger | Face | Hamster Corporation | June 28, 2018 | |
| ACA Neo Geo: Mutation Nation | SNK | Hamster Corporation | October 26, 2017 | |
| ACA Neo Geo: NAM-1975 | SNK | Hamster Corporation | March 9, 2017 | |
| ACA Neo Geo: Neo Geo Cup '98: The Road to the Victory | SNK | Hamster Corporation | November 29, 2018 | |
| ACA Neo Geo: Ninja Combat | Alpha Denshi | Hamster Corporation | May 31, 2018 | |
| ACA Neo Geo: Ninja Commando | Alpha Denshi | Hamster Corporation | September 6, 2018 | |
| ACA Neo Geo: Ninja Master's | ADK Corporation | Hamster Corporation | January 17, 2019 | |
| ACA Neo Geo: Over Top | ADK Corporation | Hamster Corporation | April 27, 2017 | |
| ACA Neo Geo: Pleasure Goal: 5 on 5 Mini Soccer | Saurus | Hamster Corporation | November 1, 2018 | |
| ACA Neo Geo: Power Spikes II | Video System | Hamster Corporation | January 18, 2018 | |
| ACA Neo Geo: Prehistoric Isle 2 | Yumekobo | Hamster Corporation | August 2, 2018 | |
| ACA Neo Geo: Pulstar | Aicom | Hamster Corporation | December 21, 2017 | |
| ACA Neo Geo: Puzzle Bobble | Taito | Hamster Corporation | December 20, 2018 | |
| ACA Neo Geo: Puzzle Bobble 2 | Taito | Hamster Corporation | February 7, 2019 | |
| ACA Neo Geo: Puzzled | SNK | Hamster Corporation | August 24, 2017 | |
| ACA Neo Geo: Ragnagard | Saurus | Hamster Corporation | January 3, 2019 | |
| ACA Neo Geo: Real Bout Fatal Fury | SNK | Hamster Corporation | March 8, 2018 | |
| ACA Neo Geo: Real Bout Fatal Fury 2 | SNK | Hamster Corporation | August 16, 2018 | |
| ACA Neo Geo: Real Bout Fatal Fury Special | SNK | Hamster Corporation | April 19, 2018 | |
| ACA Neo Geo: Riding Hero | SNK | Hamster Corporation | June 7, 2018 | |
| ACA Neo Geo: Robo Army | SNK | Hamster Corporation | October 19, 2017 | |
| ACA Neo Geo: Samurai Shodown | SNK | Hamster Corporation | July 20, 2017 | |
| ACA Neo Geo: Samurai Shodown II | SNK | Hamster Corporation | February 1, 2018 | |
| ACA Neo Geo: Samurai Shodown III | SNK | Hamster Corporation | April 5, 2018 | |
| ACA Neo Geo: Samurai SHodown IV | SNK | Hamster Corporation | April 13, 2017 | |
| ACA Neo Geo: Samurai Shodown V | SNK Playmore | Hamster Corporation | July 5, 2018 | |
| ACA Neo Geo: Samurai Shodown V Special | SNK | Hamster Corporation | April 18, 2019 | |
| ACA Neo Geo: Savage Reign | SNK | Hamster Corporation | October 25, 2018 | |
| ACA NEOGEO Selection Vol. 1 | Various | Hamster Corporation | December 12, 2024 | |
| ACA NEOGEO Selection Vol. 2 | Various | Hamster Corporation | December 12, 2024 | |
| ACA NEOGEO Selection Vol. 3 | Various | Hamster Corporation | April 10, 2025 | |
| ACA NEOGEO Selection Vol. 4 | Various | Hamster Corporation | April 10, 2025 | |
| ACA NEOGEO Selection Vol. 5 | Various | Hamster Corporation | August 7, 2025 | |
| ACA NEOGEO Selection Vol. 6 | Various | Hamster Corporation | August 7, 2025 | |
| ACA Neo Geo: Sengoku | SNK | Hamster Corporation | June 15, 2017 | |
| ACA Neo Geo: Sengoku 2 | SNK | Hamster Corporation | March 1, 2018 | |
| Aca Neo Geo: Sengoku 3 | SNK | Hamster Corporation | March 29, 2018 | |
| ACA Neo Geo: Shock Troopers | Saurus | Hamster Corporation | March 3, 2017 | |
| ACA Neo Geo: Shock Troopers: 2nd Squad | Saurus | Hamster Corporation | June 8, 2017 | |
| ACA Neo Geo: Soccer Brawl | SNK | Hamster Corporation | November 22, 2017 | |
| ACA Neo Geo: Spinmaster | Data East | Hamster Corporation | September 14, 2017 | |
| ACA Neo Geo: Stakes Winner | Saurus | Hamster Corporation | May 2, 2018 | |
| ACA Neo Geo: Stakes Winner 2 | Saurus | Hamster Corporation | November 15, 2018 | |
| ACA Neo Geo: Street Hoop | Data East | Hamster Corporation | November 9, 2017 | |
| ACA Neo Geo: Strikers 1945 Plus | Psikyo | Hamster Corporation | October 18, 2018 | |
| ACA Neo Geo: Super Baseball 2020 | SNK | Hamster Corporation | February 8, 2018 | |
| ACA Neo Geo: Super Sidekicks | SNK | Hamster Corporation | July 27, 2017 | |
| ACA Neo Geo: Super Sidekicks 2 | SNK | Hamster Corporation | May 10, 2018 | |
| ACA Neo Geo: Super Sidekicks 3: The Next Glory | SNK | Hamster Corporation | June 14, 2018 | |
| ACA Neo Geo: The Super Spy | SNK | Hamster Corporation | July 12, 2018 | |
| ACA Neo Geo: Thrash Rlaly | Alpha Denshi | Hamster Corporation | November 8, 2018 | |
| ACA Neo Geo: Top Hunter: Roddy & Cathy | SNK | Hamster Corporation | December 7, 2017 | |
| ACA Neo Geo: Top Player's Golf | SNK | Hamster Corporation | May 24, 2018 | |
| ACA Neo Geo: Twinkle Star Sprites | ADK Corporation | Hamster Corporation | December 6, 2018 | |
| ACA Neo Geo: The Ultimate 11: SNK Football Championship | SNK | Hamster Corporation | February 28, 2019 | |
| ACA Neo Geo: Waku Waku 7 | Sunsoft | Hamster Corporation | March 3, 2017 | |
| ACA Neo Geo: World Heroes | Alpha Denshi | Hamster Corporation | November 30, 2017 | |
| ACA Neo Geo: World Heroes 2 | ADK Corporation | Hamster Corporation | January 25, 2018 | |
| ACA Neo Geo: World Heroes 2 Jet | ADK Corporation | Hamster Corporation | March 22, 2018 | |
| ACA Neo Geo: World Heroes Perfect | ADK Corporation | Hamster Corporation | March 3, 2017 | |
| ACA Neo Geo: Zed Blade | NMK | Hamster Corporation | August 31, 2017 | |
| ACA Neo Geo: ZuPaPa! | SNK | Hamster Corporation | October 4, 2018 | |
| The Academy | Pine Studio | Snapbreak Games | TBA | |
| Acalesia | BAkau | Victory Road | April 1, 2021 | |
| Access Denied | Stately Snail | Ratalaika Games | February 8, 2019 | |
| Access Denied: Escape | Stately Snail | Ratalaika Games | November 15, 2023 | |
| Accolade Sports Collection | QUByte Interactive | QUByte Interactive; Atari | January 30, 2025 | |
| Ace Angler | Racjin | Bandai Namco Entertainment | July 25, 2019 | |
| Ace Angler: Fishing Spirits | Racjin | Bandai Namco Entertainment | October 22, 2022 | |
| Ace Attorney Investigations Collection | Capcom | Capcom | September 6, 2024 | |
| Ace Combat 7: Skies Unknown Deluxe Edition | Project ACES | Bandai Namco Entertainment | July 11, 2024 | |
| Ace Invaders | Max Interactive Studio | Max Interactive Studio | February 17, 2021 | |
| Ace Strike | Benoit Varasse | Pix Arts | March 6, 2021 | |
| Aces of the Luftwaffe: Squadron | HandyGames | JP: Worker Bee; WW: HandyGames | November 17, 2017 | |
| Achilles: Legends Untold | Dark Point Games | Dark Point Games | January 23, 2025 | |
| Achtung! Cthulhu Tactics | Auroch Digital | Ripstone | January 24, 2019 | |
| Acorn Tactics | Tacs Games | Tacs Games | November 30, 2017 | |
| Across the Grooves | Nova-box | Nova-box | June 17, 2020 | |
| Act it Out XL! A Game of Charades | Snap Finger Click | Snap Finger Click | January 12, 2021 | |
| Active Life: Outdoor Challenge | h.a.n.d. | Bandai Namco Entertainment | September 3, 2021 | |
| Active Neurons | Sometimes You | Sometimes You | April 29, 2020 | |
| Active Neurons 2 | Sometimes You | Sometimes You | September 16, 2020 | |
| Active Neurons 3: Wonders of the World | Sometimes You | Sometimes You | February 24, 2021 | |
| Active Soccer 2019 | The Fox Software | The Fox Software | April 19, 2019 | |
| Actraiser Renaissance | Quintet | Square Enix | September 23, 2021 | |
| Actual Sunlight | WZO Games | WZOGI | January 28, 2020 | |
| Adam's Venture: Origins | Vertigo Games | Soedesco | May 29, 2020 | |
| The Addams Family: Mansion Mayhem | PHL Collective | Outright Games | September 24, 2021 | |
| Adrenaline Rush: Highway Extreme Traffic Racer | VRCForge Studios | VRCForge Studios | May 18, 2024 | |
| Adrenaline Rush: Miami Drive | Cool Small Games | Cool Small Games | July 12, 2019 | |
| Advance Wars 1+2: Re-Boot Camp | WayForward | Nintendo | April 21, 2023 | |
| Adventure Academia: The Fractured Continent | Acquire | PQube | September 8, 2022 | |
| Adventure Field 4 | Wathitdew Record | Ilya Chkoliar | August 22, 2021 | |
| Adventure Field Remake | Wathitdew Record | Elushis | May 6, 2024 | |
| Adventure Llama | Orube Game Studio | Orube Game Studio | November 1, 2020 | |
| The Adventure Pals | Massive Monster | Armor Games | April 3, 2018 | |
| Adventure Time: Pirates of the Enchiridion | Climax Studios | Outright Games | July 17, 2018 | |
| The Adventures of 00 Dilly | Caipirinha Games | Toplitz Productions | February 20, 2020 | |
| Adventures of Bertram Fiddle Episode 1: A Dreadly Business | Rumpus Animation | Chorus Worldwide | March 29, 2018 | |
| Adventures of Bertram Fiddle Episode 2: A Bleaker Predicklement | Rumpus Animation | Chorus Worldwide | November 22, 2018 | |
| Adventures of Chris | Guin Entertainment | Graffiti Games | October 8, 2020 | |
| The Adventures of Elena Temple: Definitive Edition | GrimTalin | GrimTalin | May 15, 2018 | |
| Adventures of Pip | Tic Toc Games | Tic Toc Games | September 10, 2020 | |
| The Adventures of Spunk Dodgers and Splat | Bolder Games | Bolder Games | October 9, 2021 | |
| Adverse | Loneminded | Loneminded | January 22, 2021 | |
| Aegis Defenders | Guts Department | Humble Bundle | February 8, 2018 | |
| Aeolis Tournament | Beyond Fun Studio | Beyond Fun Studio | July 23, 2020 | |
| Aeon Drive | 2Awesome Studio | Critical Reflex | September 30, 2021 | |
| Aeon Must Die! | Limestone Games | Focus Home Interactive | October 14, 2021 | |
| AER Memories of Old | Daedalic Entertainment | Daedalic Entertainment | August 28, 2019 | |
| Aerial_Knight's Never Yield | Aerial_Knight | Headup Games | May 19, 2021 | |
| Aero Striker - World Invasion | EpiXR Games | EpiXR Games | December 19, 2022 | |
| Aero the Acro-Bat | Iguana Entertainment | Ratalaika Games | August 2, 2024 | |
| Aero the Acro-Bat 2 | Iguana Entertainment | Ratalaika Games | September 6, 2024 | |
| Aery: Ancient Empires | EpiXR Games | EpiXR Games | August 15, 2024 | |
| Aery: Broken Memories | EpiXR Games | EpiXR | August 6, 2020 | |
| Aery: Calm Mind | EpiXR Games | EpiXR | July 22, 2021 | |
| Aery: Calm Mind 2 | EpiXR Games | EpiXR Games | March 24, 2022 | |
| Aery: Calm Mind 3 | EpiXR Games | EpiXR Games | March 2, 2023 | |
| Aery: Calm Mind 4 | EpiXR Games | EpiXR Games | December 21, 2024 | |
| Aery: Cyber City | EpiXR Games | EpiXR Games | April 18, 2024 | |
| Aery: Dream Land | EpiXR Games | EpiXR Games | March 6, 2025 | |
| Aery: Dreamscape | EpiXR Games | EpIXR Games | January 13, 2022 | |
| Aery: Flow of Time | EpiXR Games | EpiXR Games | August 17, 2023 | |
| Aery: Heaven & Hell | EpiXR Games | Ultimate Games | July 20, 2023 | |
| Aery: A Journey Beyond Time | EpiXR Games | EpiXR | February 25, 2021 | |
| Aery: Last Day of Earth | EpiXR Games | EpiXR Games | October 20, 2022 | |
| Aery: Little Bird Adventure | EpiXR Games | EpiXR | June 18, 2020 | |
| Aery: The Lost Hero | EpiXR Games | EpiXR Games | June 1, 2023 | |
| Aery: Midnight Hour | EpiXR Games | EpiXR Games | October 17, 2024 | |
| Aery: A New Frontier | EpiXR Games | EpiXR Games | May 12, 2022 | |
| Aery: Path of Corruption | EpiXR Games | EpiXR Games | December 15, 2022 | |
| Aery: Peace of Mind | EpiXR Games | EpiXR Games | June 6, 2024 | |
| Aery: Peace of Mind 2 | EpiXR Games | EpiXR Games | November 7, 2024 | |
| Aery: Peace of Mind 3 | EpiXR Games | EpiXR Games | July 3, 2025 | |
| Aery: Sky Castle | EpiXR Games | EpiXR Games | October 8, 2020 | |
| Aery: Stone Age | EpiXR Games | EpiXR Games | February 22, 2024 | |
| Aery: Titans of the Future | EpiXR Games | EpiXR Games | July 3, 2025 | |
| Aery: Vikings | EpiXR Games | EpiXR Games | July 21, 2022 | |
| Aeterna Noctis | Aeternum Game Studios | Aeternum Game Studios | December 15, 2021 | |
| AeternoBlade | Corecell Technology | JP: Corecell Technology; WW: PQube | February 1, 2018 | |
| AeternoBlade II | Corecell Technology | JP: Corecell Technology; WW: PQube | October 11, 2019 | |
| AEW Fight Forever | Yuke's | THQ Nordic | June 29, 2023 | |
| AFL Evolution 2 | Wicked Witch Software | Tru Blu Games | April 16, 2020 | |
| Afterlove EP | Pikselnesia | Fellow Traveller | February 14, 2025 | |
| Afterparty | Night School Studio | Night School Studio | March 6, 2020 | |
| Afterpulse | Digital Legends | Digital Legends | March 30, 2021 | |
| Agartha-S | Mebius | Mebius | January 31, 2019 | |
| Agatha Christie – Hercule Poirot: The First Cases | Blazing Griffin | Microids | September 28, 2021 | |
| Agatha Christie - Hercule Poirot: The London Case | Blazing Griffin | Microids | August 29, 2023 | |
| Agatha Christie - Murder on the Orient Express | Microids Studio Lyon | Microids | October 19, 2023 | |
| Agatha Christie: The ABC Murders | Artefacts Studio | Microids | October 6, 2020 | |
| Agatha Knife | Mango Protocol | Mango Protocol | April 26, 2018 | |
| Age of Sokoban | Erik Games | Erik Games | June 10, 2021 | |
| Ageless | One More Dream Studios | Team17 | July 28, 2020 | |
| Agent A: A Puzzle in Disguise | Yak | Yak | August 29, 2019 | |
| Ages of Mages: The Last Keeper | YFC Games | YFC Games | May 30, 2019 | |
| Aggelos | Storybird Games | JP: Arc System Works; WW: PQube | April 24, 2019 | |
| Agony | Madmind Studio | Forever Entertainment | October 31, 2019 | |
| Aground | Fancy Fish Games | Whitethorn Digital | February 11, 2021 | |
| Ai Kiss | Giga | Entergram | December 23, 2021 | |
| Ai Kiss 2 | Giga | Entergram | March 25, 2021 | |
| Ai Kiss 3: Cute | Giga | Entergram | March 25, 2022 | |
| AI: The Somnium Files | Spike Chunsoft | Spike Chunsoft | September 17, 2019 | |
| AI: The Somnium Files – Nirvana Initiative | Spike Chunsoft | Spike Chunsoft | June 23, 2022 | |
| Aikano: Yukizora no Triangle | Prekano | Entergram | October 29, 2020 | |
| Ailment | BeardyBird Games | Ultimate Games | May 27, 2020 | |
| Air | Key | Prototype | September 9, 2021 | |
| Air Bounce: The Jump 'n' Run Challenge | EpiXR Games | EpiXR | January 21, 2021 | |
| Air Conflicts: Pacific Carriers | Games Farm | JP: H2 Interactive; WW: Kalypso Media | March 26, 2019 | |
| Air Conflicts: Secret Wars | Games Farm | JP: H2 Interactive; WW: Kalypso Media | March 26, 2019 | |
| Air Hockey | Sabec | Sabec | February 28, 2018 | |
| Air Mail | N-Fusion Interactive | N-Fusion Interactive | June 26, 2018 | |
| Air Missions: Hind | 3Division | Pikii | July 30, 2020 | |
| Air Racers | Benjamin Kistler | Kistler Studios | November 1, 2021 | |
| Air Stunt Racing | Pix Arts | Pix Arts | October 30, 2021 | |
| Air Twister | Yu Suzuki | Inin Games | November 10, 2023 | |
| Airborne Kingdom | The Wandering Band | indie.io | December 17, 2020 | |
| Aircraft Evolution | Satur Entertainment | Sometimes You | July 22, 2020 | |
| Airfield Mania | Sprakelsoft | Sprakelsoft | March 27, 2019 | |
| Airhead | Octato | HandyGames | June 7, 2024 | |
| Airheart: Tales of Broken Wings | Blindflug Studios | Blindflug Studios | January 31, 2019 | |
| Airoheart | Pixel Heart Studio | Soedesco | September 30, 2022 | |
| An Airport for Aliens Currently Run by Dogs | Strange Scaffold | Strange Scaffold | May 25, 2021 | |
| Aiyoku no Eustia | August | Entergram | June 23, 2022 | |
| Akai Ito HD Remaster | Success Corporation | Success Corporation | May 25, 2023 | |
| Akai Katana Shin | City Connection | City Connection | June 28, 2023 | |
| Akane | Ludic Studios | Qubic Games | May 17, 2019 | |
| Akash: Path of the Five | Truant Pixel | Truant Pixel | September 16, 2019 | |
| Akatori | TeamNora Games | HypeTrain Digital | TBA | |
| Akatsuki: Lord of the Dawn | ZOO Corporation | ZOO Corporation | March 28, 2024 | |
| Akatsuki Yureru Koi Akari | CRYSTALiA | Entergram | February 22, 2023 | |
| Akiba's Trip: Hellbound & Debriefed | Acquire | JP: Acquire; WW: Xseed Games | May 20, 2021 | |
| Akiba's Trip: Undead & Undressed Director's Cut | Acquire | JP: Acquire; WW: Xseed Games | August 1, 2023 | |
| Akihabara: Feel the Rhythm Remixed | JMJ Interactive | JMJ Interactive | November 29, 2018 | |
| Akihabara Crash! 123 Stage +1 | Dorasu | Dorasu | November 29, 2018 | |
| Akinofa | Pixel Lantern | Pixel Lantern | July 15, 2021 | |
| Akita Oga Mystery Guide: The Frozen Silverbell Flower | Happymeal | Flyhigh Works | December 24, 2020 | |
| Akka Arrh | Llamasoft | Atari | February 21, 2023 | |
| Akuto: Showdown | Hut 90 | QubicGames | December 26, 2019 | |
| Alan Wake Remastered | Remedy Entertainment | Epic Games Publishing | October 20, 2022 | |
| Alba: A Wildlife Adventure | Ustwo | JP: Sunsoft; WW: PID Publishing | June 9, 2021 | |
| Alchemic Cutie | Vakia, Viridian Software | PM Studios | June 16, 2023 | |
| Alchemic Dungeons DX | Q-Cumber Factory | Flyhigh Works | February 14, 2019 | |
| Alchemic Jousts | Lunatic Pixels | Lunatic Pixels | June 12, 2018 | |
| Alchemist Adventure | Bad Minions | Super.com | June 10, 2021 | |
| Alchemist Simulator | Art Games Studio, polyslash | Art Games Studio | March 11, 2021 | |
| Alchemist's Castle | Kodobur Yazilim | Kodobur Yazilim | October 13, 2019 | |
| Alder's Blood | Shockwork Games | No Gravity Games | March 13, 2020 | |
| Aldred Knight | QUByte Interactive | QUByte Interactive | October 8, 2019 | |
| Aleste Collection | M2 | M2 | December 24, 2020 | |
| Alex Kidd in Miracle World DX | Jankenteam | Merge Games | June 22, 2021 | |
| Alfonzo's Arctic Adventure | Spoony Bard Productions | Limited Run Games | July 30, 2021 | |
| Alfred Hitchcock – Vertigo | Pendulo Studios | Microids | September 27, 2022 | |
| Alice Gear Aegis CS: Concerto of Simulatrix | Pyramid | Mages | September 8, 2022 | |
| Alice in the Country of Hearts: Wonderful Black World | Idea Factory | Idea Factory | TBA | |
| Alice in the Country of Hearts: Wonderful White World | QuinRose | Idea Factory | September 2, 2021 | |
| Alien Cruise | Cotton Game | Orenda | March 14, 2019 | |
| Alien Escape | Korion | Korion | July 12, 2019 | |
| Alien Hominid HD | The Behemoth | The Behemoth | November 1, 2023 | |
| Alien Hominid Invasion | The Behemoth | The Behemoth | November 1, 2023 | |
| Alien: Isolation | Creative Assembly | Sega | December 5, 2019 | |
| Aliens Drive Me Crazy | Rebel Twins | Rebel Twins | October 14, 2021 | |
| All-Star Fruit Racing | 3D Clouds | JP: Circle Entertainment; WW: PQube | July 13, 2018 | |
| All Walls Must Fall | inbetweengames | Ultimate Games | January 20, 2021 | |
| The Alliance Alive HD Remastered | Cattle Call | JP: FuRyu; WW: NIS America | October 8, 2019 | |
| Alluris | 562 Interactive | 562 Interactive | September 24, 2020 | |
| Almightree: The Last Dreamer | Godspeed Games, Chocoarts | West Coast Software | December 13, 2018 | |
| The Almost Gone | Happy Volcano | Playdigious | June 25, 2020 | |
| Almost There: The Platformer | The Quantum Astrophysicists Guild | The Quantum Astrophysicists Guild | February 21, 2019 | |
| Alone With You | Benjamin Rivers | Benjamin Rivers | July 30, 2021 | |
| Along the Edge | Nova-box | Nova-box | October 15, 2020 | |
| Aloof | ButtonX | Red Deer Games | October 14, 2021 | |
| Alpaca Ball: Allstars | Salt Castle Studio | JP: Leoful; WW: BadLand Publishing | October 15, 2020 | |
| Alpha | Kaname | Kaname | April 18, 2019 | |
| Alphadia Genesis | Exe Create | Kemco | August 6, 2020 | |
| Alphadia Genesis 2 | EXE-CREATE | Kemco | July 1, 2021 | |
| Alt-Frequencies | Accidental Queens | Plug In Digital | December 10, 2020 | |
| Alteric | Goonswarm | Sometimes You | March 30, 2018 | |
| Alternate Jake Hunter: Daedalus The Awakening of Golden Jazz | Neilo | Arc System Works | December 13, 2018 | |
| The Alto Collection | Team Alto | Snowman | November 26, 2020 | |
| Aluna: Sentinel of the Shards | DigiArt Interactive | DigiArt Interactive | May 26, 2021 | |
| Alvastia Chronicles | Exe Create | Kemco | February 14, 2019 | |
| Alveole | Emil Ismaylov And Denis Petrov | Sometimes You | September 1, 2021 | |
| Alwa's Awakening | Elden Pixels | Elden Pixels | September 27, 2018 | |
| Alwa's Legacy | Elden Pixels | Elden Pixels | September 29, 2020 | |
| Always Sometimes Monsters | Vagabond Dog | Vagabond Dog | April 8, 2021 | |
| Amaekata wa Kanojo Nari ni | Entergram | Entergram | January 24, 2019 | |
| Amairo Chocolate | Cabbage Soft | HuneX | March 28, 2024 | |
| Amakano | Azarashi Soft | Ares | November 24, 2022 | |
| Amakano: Second Season | Azarashi Soft | Ares | November 30, 2023 | |
| Amanda the Adventurer 3 | MANGLEDmaw Games | DreadXP | November 6, 2025 | |
| The Amazing American Circus | Juggler Games | Klabater | September 16, 2021 | |
| Amazing Breaker | Dekovir | Big Way | October 27, 2021 | |
| Amazing Brick Breaker | Cyberfront Korea | CFK | November 28, 2019 | |
| The Amazing Shinsengumi: Heroes in Love | D3 Publisher | D3 Publisher | August 9, 2018 | |
| The Ambassador: Fractured Timelines | TinyDino Games | The Quantum Astrophysicists Guild | August 13, 2020 | |
| Amber Isle | Ambertail Games | Team17 | February 13, 2025 | |
| Ambition of the Slimes | Altairworks | Flyhigh Works | December 28, 2017 | |
| Ambitious Mission | Saga Planets | Entergram | March 21, 2024 | |
| America Wild Hunting | Benoit Varasse | Pix Arts | March 5, 2021 | |
| American Arcadia | Out of the Blue Games | Raw Fury | May 15, 2025 | |
| American Fugitive | Fallen Tree Games | JP: Teyon; WW: Curve Digital | May 23, 2019 | |
| American Hero | Inter-Active Productions | Ziggurat | November 11, 2021 | |
| American Ninja Warrior: Challenge | Gaming Corps Austin | GameMill Entertainment | March 19, 2019 | |
| Amnesia | Design Factory | Idea Factory | September 12, 2019 | |
| Amnesia Collection | Frictional Games | Frictional Games | September 12, 2019 | |
| Amnesia Later x Crowd | Design Factory | Idea Factory | October 3, 2019 | |
| Amnesia World | Design Factory | Idea Factory | August 19, 2021 | |
| Amoeba Battle: Microscopic RTS Action | Grab Games | Grab Games | March 3, 2020 | |
| Among Pipes | Prison Games | Prison Games | March 18, 2021 | |
| Among the Sleep: Enhanced Edition | Krillbite Studio | Soedesco | May 29, 2019 | |
| Among Us | Innersloth | Innersloth | December 15, 2020 | |
