= The Amazing American Circus =

2021 video game

- Developers: Klabater; Juggler Games
- Publisher: Klabater
- Platforms: Nintendo Switch; PlayStation 4; PlayStation 5; Windows; Xbox One; Xbox Series X/S
- Release: WW: September 16, 2021
- Genre: Deck-building
- Mode: Single-player

The Amazing American Circus is a deck-building video game published by Klabater and developed by Klabater and Juggler Games.

== Gameplay ==
Players control a person who has inherited a circus in 19th century America. To prepare for a national competition, players travel the country and perform shows. This is done using deck-building mechanics. Players engage in card battles to impress audiences, playing cards to decrease their boredom. Players are given strategic choices, such as choosing to improve both their shows or an individual performer. Players' decks comprise cards based on which of three performers they select. New performers can be recruited in each city.

== Development ==
Klabater and Juggler Games developed The Amazing American Circus in Poland. Klabater released it for Windows, PlayStation 4 and 5, Xbox One and Series X/S, and Nintendo Switch on September 16, 2021.

== Reception ==
Reception

Aggregate scores
Aggregator	Score
Metacritic	(PC) 53/100
OpenCritic	22% recommend

Review score
Publication	Score
Nintendo World Report	8/10

The PC version of The Amazing American Circus received "mixed or average" reviews from critics, according to the review aggregation website Metacritic. Fellow review aggregator OpenCritic assessed that the game received weak approval, being recommended by 22% of critics. Rock Paper Shotgun praised the premise and "endearingly playful touches", but they said it becomes a slog and criticized the bugs. Although they enjoyed the combat mechanics, RPGamer criticized what they felt was a lack of substance and said it fails live up to the unique premise. Nintendo World Report praised the presentation and battles. They recommended it to people who do not mind a game where it is difficult to recover from mistakes.
