= Acceleration of Suguri X Edition =

2011 video game

- Developer: Orange Juice
- Publisher: Rockin' Android
- Platforms: PlayStation 3, Microsoft Windows
- Release: PlayStation 3: WW: February 15, 2011; Windows: WW: July 2, 2014
- Genre: Fighting

Acceleration of Suguri X Edition is a 2011 Japanese fighting video game developed by Japanese indie game developer Orange Juice. It was made for the PlayStation Network and later ported to Microsoft Windows in the Suguri Collection on Steam.

== Reception ==
Reception

Aggregate scores
Aggregator	Score
GameRankings	PS3: 69%
Metacritic	PS3: 61/100

Review scores
Publication	Score
GameSpot	7/10
Game Industry News	3.5/5
