= Adrenix =

1998 first-person shooter game

- Developer: Digital Dialect
- Publisher: Playmates Interactive
- Platform: Windows
- Release: May 1998
- Genre: First-person shooter
- Mode: Single-player

Adrenix is a 1998 first-person shooter video game created by developer Digital Dialect and published by Playmates Interactive Entertainment.

== Plot ==
Adrenix is set in a dystopian post-apocalyptic setting following environmental and nuclear disaster, leading the United States to enter a state of martial law. The game is played from the perspective of pilot Scott Griffin who is wronged by The General, a commander who implicates Griffin in scandal and kidnaps his fiancé Maria. The General is involved with Medtech, a government-run facility conducting medical experiments on humans. Griffin joins a rebel insurrection he formerly fought against as a policeman to rebel against Medtech, infiltrate the facility and rescue Maria.

== Gameplay ==
In-game screenshot of the first-person view camera in Adrenix.

Adrenix is a 3D shoot-em-up game in which the player navigates a fighter craft in a first-person perspective with six degrees of freedom. Players destroy enemies using a variety of primary and secondary weapons collected throughout the game, including shields and missiles. The game is broken into 24 missions set in open-ended areas providing different mission goals such as protecting convoys, launching covert extractions or destroying specific targets.

== Development ==
Publisher Playmates Interactive announced the release of Adrenix at E3 in June 1997 with an original release date for January 1998, described by Computer Games Strategy Plus as a "3D shooter (that) takes place over cities and has over 20 levels, missions with multiple objectives, and a story that develops over the course of the game."

In an interview previewing the alpha build of the game for Next Generation (magazine), producer and designer Chris Archer stated that Adrenix was designed "to get away from" the "corridor shooter" genre and towards a game that is "story-driven and provides a lot of strategy and objective-based missions".

Adrenix was noted by publications to be marketed as a budget title at a price point of £19.99 upon release; at half the normal retail price of a new video game at the time.

== Reception ==
Reception

Review scores
Publication	Score
Hyper	79%
PC Games (DE)	41%
PC PowerPlay	72%
PC Zone	37%
Ultimate PC	70%
Power Play	61% / 65%

Reception of Adrenix was mostly positive. March Stepnik of PC PowerPlay praised the story and mission design of Adrenix as its "main difference" from other titles, noting that the "complex, multiple objective missions...closely tie in with the story". Miles Gutter of Ultimate PC highlighted the level design, noting the "wide open areas" and "towering buildings" of Adrenix create "well realised cities", although critiquing the lack of environmental animation and lighting effects to "bring things to life a little".

Critics disagreed upon the handling of the controls. David Wildgoose of Hyper praised the straightforward controls and engine, noting the game "borrows heavily from the Quake model and thus offers a painless way of controlling your ship...half the game isn't being able to master the controls". Miles Gutter of Ultimate PC felt "the controls don't feel very realistic compared to other similar games around at the moment - there's no inertia and therefore no real sensation of flight. You're simply floating around like a ghost."

Critics were divided on the merits of Adrenix compared to the similar first-person shooter series Descent, particularly in terms of gameplay and tone. Richie Shoemaker of PC Zone critiqued the game as a "Descent clone" that lacked its "claustrophobia", arguing the game possessed "no sense of involvement and few surprises". David Wildgoose of Hyper agreed that Adrenix "never scared me like Descent could, nor got my blood rushing like Forsaken did at times, but I enjoyed (it) nevertheless." Ultimate PC disagreed, stating that Adrenix "has been compared favourably (with) Descent...however, it's really a great game in its own right, with superbly detailed graphics...humour, and highly intelligent enemies."
