= Ascension to the Throne =

2007 video game

- Developer: DVS
- Publisher: 1C Publishing
- Platform: Windows
- Release: 26 January 2007
- Genre: Turn-based strategy game

Ascension to the Throne (Russian: Восхождение на трон) is a turn-based strategy game with RPG elements. It was developed by the Ukrainian video game company DVS, published by then 1C Publishing (now Fulqrum Publishing) and was released on 26 January 2007 for Microsoft Windows.

== Gameplay ==
Gameplay is divided into two aspects, either a free roaming environment where the player wanders around and interacts with various NPCs and hostile encounters, which are usually denoted by a circle around the enemy party radius, or a hex-based traditional turn-based strategy during battles. In battles, the player controls his entire party.

== Plot ==
The player assumes the role of the last offspring of the ancient family Illiar named Alexander, which has ruled the kingdom of Airath for ages. After the enemies of the dynasty attacked their castle, they slaughtered the king's entire family and destroyed his settlement. Before they could kill him, a powerful spell threw the king to a land far beyond his country, where he was left on his own without any relatives, friends, army or money. The king has taken a vow of vengeance, to gain enough power and followers to return to his usurped lands and reclaim them - by force. He meets a female warrior named Eneya on his adventure and a mage called Rafael and together they raise an army to battle Samael who wanders in the disguised human form by the name of Wolfguard.

== Sequel ==
A sequel was released on August 29 2008, dubbed Ascension to the Throne: Valkyrie.
