= Aurora: The Secret Within =

2008 video game

- Developer: BluMiAl Studios
- Publisher: Lexicon Entertainment
- Release: WW: 2008

Aurora: The Secret Within is a 2008 adventure game developed by Italian company BluMiAl Studio and published by Lexicon Entertainment.

== Production ==
Italian development company BluMiAl Studio was founded by Michel Palucci and Alessio Restaino; Aurora was their debut project. The game was designed in the Adventure Maker program.

The game was originally promised for the summer of 2007. In addition, a Russian-language version to be released in Russia, the CIS countries and the Baltics was projected for December 2007. On March 13, 2008, Aurora: The Secret Within hit gold status and was set for a release date of April 25, 2008. The game was released by Tri Synergy in North America.

== Plot and gameplay ==
The plot revolves about the UFO crash at Roswell. A detective, named Pileggi, has been called in to investigate the disappearance of a farmer.

The game is a point and click adventure game from the perspective of the main characters. The game's style and theme bow to the Tex Murphy series. Players navigate in the style of Myst.

== Critical reception ==
Prior to release, Adventure Archiv was fascinated how the developers would have brought a new spin to the oft-adapted story of Roswell.

Technopolis felt the game came across as amateurish. Adventure Classic Gaming thought the game's confused localization - half in English and half in Italian was a great hindrance to its enjoyment from players. Adventure Archiv described the title as a fair debut independent release, and encouraged the development team to keep working on their talents. Adventure Planet thought the game was an "absolutely artisanal, experimental product" made by two people on no budget, though appreciated their audacity. Adventure Treff discouraged the game even to adventure fans.

The game was "hugely successful in Europe and Asia".
