= A Virus Named TOM =

2012 video game

- Developer: Misfits Attic
- Publisher: Misfits Attic
- Platforms: Windows, OS X, Linux, PlayStation Vita
- Release: WW: August 1, 2012
- Genre: Puzzle

A Virus Named TOM is a puzzle game for Windows, macOS, Linux, and PlayStation Vita, though it was planned for Xbox Live Arcade and PlayStation Network. It was developed by the independent American game developer Misfits Attic, and the PC versions were released worldwide on August 1, 2012. The PlayStation Vita version was released on April 5, 2016 as a part of the Instant Game Collection titles for PlayStation Plus.

== Development ==
Planning and development of A Virus Named TOM took place over several years. A playable demo of the game was sent to Indiecade in June 2010, and an alpha build was submitted to Independent Games Festival in November 2010. The game garnered press attention in August 2011 after being demoed at Game Developers Conference Europe. By February 2012, the game had entered beta and was available for pre-order. The game was finally released on Steam and Desura on August 1, 2012.

The development for other platforms was originally planned and considered, but they never came to fruition. Development for Xbox Live Arcade, PlayStation Network, and PC was announced by the developers, but the releases for the former two platforms never occurred.

In February 2013, Misfits Attic announced that the game was being ported to PlayStation Vita and would be released during the coming summer. The game did not release that summer, but the developer indicated that the port had reached a beta stage via Facebook in January 2014. Misfits Attic confirmed the port was still in development as of June 2014. It was released on April 5, 2016 as part of the Instant Game Collection titles for PlayStation Plus.
