= ABC Sports Indy Racing =

1997 video game

- Cover art
- Developer: Shot Sports Software
- Publisher: ABC Interactive
- Platform: Windows
- Release: 1997
- Genre: Racing
- Modes: Single-player, multiplayer

ABC Sports Indy Racing is a racing computer game made in 1997. It was officially licensed by the Indy Racing League.

== Gameplay ==
The game is based on 1996–97 Indy Racing League season and features the drivers and the tracks from that season. The game also features the USAC Silver Crown Series, USAC Sprint Cars, and USAC Midgets that can race at Indianapolis Raceway Park, Phoenix Raceway, Eldora Speedway, Winchester Speedway, and Terre Haute Action Track.

Notably, alcohol car sponsors appear in the game despite often being censored in other video games based on real-life racing series.

The game also featured online multiplayer that supported up to four players.

== Reception ==
Reception

Review score
Publication	Score
PC PowerPlay	64%
