= Aztaka =

2009 video game

- Developer: Citérémis
- Publisher: Citérémis
- Platforms: Microsoft Windows, OS X
- Release: Windows; May 7, 2009; OS X December 19, 2012
- Genres: Action role-playing game, Metroidvania
- Mode: Single-player

Aztaka is a 2D side-scrolling action role-playing video game for the Microsoft Windows and OS X developed by Canadian independent game developer Citérémis. The game is set in the Aztec period, with characters and story being re-interpretations of Aztec mythology and pre-Hispanic Mexican culture. It puts the player in the role of an Aztec warrior named "Huitzilo" who must gather seven phonographs to save his civilization from its angry gods.

== Gameplay ==
Game screenshot

The gameplay is reminiscent of an old-school action role-playing game. The player climbs, crawls and jumps his way around a level to explore it and find new items. Experience points are gained for every enemy killed, and they are spent to upgrade the character's attributes and special skills. There is also an inventory screen where discovered items can be equipped and where merchandise bought from merchants (like potions) can be used.

The game is controlled with the WASD keys (makes Huitzilo move and jump) and the mouse (to attack or grab items). Doing this allows the player to modify parts of the game world, as well as unlock a variety of doorways or pick-up previously unattainable items. As the player progresses in the game, he gains containers that allow him to store on-screen energy particles for later use. The mouse is also used to cast spells, both offensive and defensive, by selecting them from the bottom-screen magic inventory and then clicking at on-screen targets in succession to launch them.

Artwork throughout the game reflects historical Mesoamerica, with square-shaped pyramids, stone temples, mystic engravings, dense jungles, and barren mountaintops. The game's musical score features vocals, flute, cello, organ, and drums.

== History ==
The game was released as DRM-free digital self-distribution on the developer's website and on Direct2Drive in May 2009. Later that year the game also launched on Steam. In 2011, Citérémis offered a "Developer's Edition" for a limited period of time (7 to 31 January). This edition included the source code of the game, as well as the art book and soundtrack.

== Reception ==
The game was received by press and game news websites overall good to mixed. It was mentioned in an article about indie game development in Italian magazine The Games Machine.
