= Airport Simulator 2019 =

2018 video game

- Developer: Toplitz Productions
- Publisher: Toplitz Productions
- Platforms: Microsoft Windows, PlayStation 4, Xbox One
- Release: Microsoft Windows; May 31, 2018; PlayStation 4, Xbox One; August 15, 2018
- Genre: Simulation game
- Mode: Single-player

Airport Simulator 2019 is a single-player simulation game, part of the Airport Simulator series. It was developed by Toplitz Productions and released for Microsoft Windows on May 31, 2018, with Xbox One and PlayStation 4 on August 15, 2018. The game puts the player in charge of the new manager of a major international airport, with the goal of developing and expanding it, similar to Airport Tycoon.

== Gameplay ==
At the beginning, the player gets a garage of three airport vehicles: a bus, a baggage carrier, and a fuel truck, with some money. With a fixed number of flights per day, the job is to drive a vehicle (with differences between each other like the speed and handling) across the airport to take them to the plane. The working day ends when all the passengers are transported. From there, staff which will be doing the driving and working for each vehicle can be hired. Staff and vehicles (which can get damaged, or run out of fuel) both can be upgraded as the game progresses.
