= Atlantis Sky Patrol =

2006 video game

- Developer: Big Fish Studios
- Publisher: Big Fish Games
- Designers: Emmanuel Marty; Jerome Grandsire
- Engine: PTK
- Platforms: Windows, Mac OS X, iOS
- Release: August 2006: Windows, Mac; August 2009: iOS
- Genre: Puzzle
- Mode: Single-player

Atlantis Sky Patrol is a tile-matching puzzle video game developed by the team formerly known as Funpause, now part of Big Fish Studios, and distributed by Big Fish Games. The game is a sequel to 2005's Atlantis.

== Plot ==
In an alternative, retro-futuristic in the early 20th century, the player takes the role of the leader of the Sky Patrol, a secretive air patrol that takes on world threats. As the game begins, strange doomsday devices have been reportedly seen all across the world. Believed to originate from the long-lost continent of Atlantis, possibly as retaliation from looting its treasure in the first game, the player must disable all of them to save the world.
