= APOX =

2011 video game

- Box art for APOX
- Developer: BlueGiant Interactive
- Publisher: BlueGiant Interactive
- Engine: OGRE (graphics)
- Platform: Microsoft Windows
- Release: January 20, 2011
- Genres: Real Time Strategy, Indie, Action
- Modes: Single-player, multiplayer

APOX is a real-time strategy game developed and published by Indian studio BlueGiant Interactive for Microsoft Windows, released through Steam on January 20, 2011, takes place in a near-future, post-apocalyptic, Mad Max-esque setting.

== Gameplay ==
APOX includes features inherent in most RTS games including base-building, control points, and resource management. It is distinctive, however, in having units that can assume the prone position, crouch, and loot corpses like an FPS game.

Players can, according to Steam, create their own unit designs by having units switch weapons between each other and by having them occupy vehicles.

The game has 100 maps with up to 32 AI or players online and can play either co-op or PVP. There are eight single player missions that are to be played as a tutorial for the game.

== Reception ==
The game received generally unfavorable reviews and has a Metacritic score of 48/100 based on six reviews. IGN gave the game a 4.5/10, citing poor graphics, repetitive gameplay, and clunky presentation.
