= Adventure at the Chateau d'Or =

2001 video game

- Developer: Karma Labs
- Publisher: Karma Labs
- Platforms: Macintosh; Microsoft Windows
- Release: April 2, 2001
- Genre: Adventure

Adventure at the Chateau d'Or is a 2001 adventure game, developed and published by Karma Labs.

== Production ==
In August 2000, it was reported that the long-awaited game, which had spent over two years in development, was due to ship in September of that year. The game was eventually postponed until April 2, 2001, when it was released in North American retailers such as Electronics Boutique and Hastings, and online stores including Amazon.com, Chumbo.com, and Outpost.com.

The game was made in English, but the developers were open to releases in other languages if they could find publishers willing to create dubs and subtitles.

== Plot ==
The player has been quested by a beautiful princess to find out the mysteries of a castle called "Chateau d'Or".

== Gameplay ==
Gameplay is similar to Myst involving the player navigating through a series of static screens. The puzzles have three difficulty levels, and the game has a map feature helps the player move around. The game is primarily an adventure game, but includes some RPG-like elements.

== Critical reception ==
Adventure-Archiv reviewer Annamarie previewed a demo of the game and concluded she was looking forward to playing the full game.

Kestrel of GameZone praised the unique storytelling and aesthetically pleasing graphics. Rosemary Young of Metzomagic appreciated the educational element of the game, that introduced players to the history and architecture of France. Tap-Repeatedly criticised the game for being too short, comparing it in this regard to The Forgotten and Isis. Bob Mandel of The Adrenaline Vault thought the game offered a new spin on the Myst clone. A GameOver reviewer thought the game had a light and relaxing feel, though thought it should have been released as a bargain bin product instead of $40.
