= The A-Files (video game) =

1998 video game

- Developer: Gyldendal
- Publisher: Gyldendal
- Platforms: Windows; Classic Mac OS
- Release: 1998
- Genres: Adventure, educational
- Mode: Single-player

The A-Files is a 1998 video game for Windows and Macintosh by Norwegian developer Gyldendal, in collaboration with five book publishers in the Nordic region. The game was "relatively inexpensive" to produce. It was authored by Paul Westlake and Fiona Miller.

The game became popular throughout the Nordic countries and was also sold in Germany, Italy and The Netherlands.

== Awards ==
- "The New Media Prize" in Bologna, Italy.
- "Best interactive production of the year" in Gullklappan 99, Sweden .
- "Education & Home Learning" at the International EMMA Awards in Amsterdam.
