= Aegis Defenders =

2018 video game

- Developer: Guts Department
- Publisher: Humble Bundle
- Director: Bryce Kho
- Producer: Max Palazzo
- Designers: Bryce Kho; Mike Effenberger; Max Palazzo
- Programmer: Kristen Kho
- Artist: Bryce Kho
- Writers: Bryce Kho; Lai Xu
- Composer: Riley Koenig
- Engine: Unity
- Platforms: macOS; Windows; Nintendo Switch; PlayStation 4
- Release: February 8, 2018
- Genres: Platform; tower defense
- Modes: Single-player, multiplayer

Aegis Defenders is a 2D platformer and tower defense game developed by Guts Department. The game originated as a project for USC’s Intermediate Games class and had a successful Kickstarter campaign in 2014. It was later picked up by publisher Humble Bundle in 2017 with Japanese publishing support from Kakehashi Games. Aegis Defenders was released on February 8, 2018, on macOS, Microsoft Windows, PlayStation 4, and Nintendo Switch.

== Gameplay ==
In Aegis Defenders, players control a team of up to 2 characters. In addition to running, jumping, and attacking, each character has a unique sub-ability and can build a unique item. Players can use "cross fusion" to combine items into more powerful ones.

Each level is usually split into exploration and tower defense phases. The exploration phase consists of platforming and puzzle solving. During the tower defense phase, players must protect their base (an important person or object) from waves of approaching enemies. There are 18 levels in the story campaign plus 3 bonus levels featuring crossover characters from other Kickstarter games including Shovel Knight, Lunais from Timespinner, and Derpl Zork from Awesomenauts.

== Plot ==
Aegis Defenders follows a pair of Ruinhunters, Bart and his grand daughter Clu, as they discover a powerful weapon known as Aegis and embark on a quest to prevent it from falling into the hands of an evil empire. Along the way they join forces with Kobo the companion drone, Kaiim the monk, and Zula the bandit.

== Development and release ==
Aegis Defenders originated as a student project by Bryce Kho and Lifu Lin for USC’s Intermediate Games class. After graduating, Bryce started indie studio Guts Department to develop the project into a full game and launched a successful Kickstarter campaign in 2014.

The game was primarily developed by a 3-person team with Bryce Kho as director/writer/artist/designer, his sister Kristen Kho as engineer, and Max Palazzo as producer. Bryce's wife, Lai Xu, co-wrote the script. Max Palazzo and Mike Effenberger assisted Bryce with design and tuning for levels.

Guts Department partnered with Power Up Audio for the music and sound effects. The soundtrack was composed by Riley Koenig. It features 14 original tracks that blend together old-school synth elements with more traditional Japanese RPG orchestral music.

The game was demoed at several conventions including PAX West 2017 Indie Megabooth, Tokyo Game Show 2017, Gamescom 2017, PlayStation Experience 2017, and SXSW 2018. Aegis Defenders released on Nintendo Switch, PlayStation 4, Windows and macOS on February 8, 2018.

== Reception ==
Reception

Aggregate scores
Aggregator	Score
Metacritic	NS: 74/100; PC: 76/100; PS4: 78/100
OpenCritic	60% recommend

Review scores
Publication	Score
Destructoid	8.5/10
Famitsu	32/40
Nintendo Life	9/10
Nintendo World Report	8.5/10

Destructoid's Chris Carter said "Aegis Defenders is a smooth, well-thought-out ride. The original art, charm, and in-game universe only add to it, and I'd love to see more." The game received a Gold Award in the Famitsu cross review, issue 1525 (February 2018), and was nominated for the 2018 SXSW Gamer's Voice Award. It received the "Best of the Mix" award at the E3 Week Mix 2017.
