= Agent A: A Puzzle in Disguise =

2015 video game

- Developers: Yak & Co
- Publishers: Yak & Co
- Engine: Unity
- Platforms: iOS, Android, macOS, Nintendo Switch, PlayStation 4, Windows, Xbox One
- Release: iOS: WW: October 28, 2015; Android: WW: October 19, 2016; macOS, Nintendo Switch, PlayStation 4, Windows, Xbox One: WW: August 29, 2019
- Genre: Puzzle adventure
- Mode: Single-player

Agent A: A Puzzle In Disguise is a puzzle adventure video game developed and published by Australian studio Yak & Co. The player's mission is to infiltrate enemy spy Ruby La Rouge's secret hideaway and put a stop to her evil plans.

Chapters 1-5 are currently available on iOS and Android with the complete tale of espionage on Steam, Nintendo Switch, PlayStation 4, Xbox One, macOS, iOS and Android.

== Gameplay ==
Screenshot

The player takes the role of Agent A, a secret agent assigned to catch a dangerous enemy spy that has been targeting fellow agents. The game takes place in the secret lair of the main antagonist, Ruby La Rouge. After witnessing La Rouge's infiltration scheme that leads to the supposed demise of Agent A's chief in the prologue video, the player is then led to the secret lair on the shoreline not far from the committed crime. The player then gathers key items hidden in spots around certain parts of the lair that will lead to unlocking new areas in hopes of finally catching up with and defeating La Rouge. Collecting the key items and utilising them in the environment to solve the puzzles is the core mechanic while relying on the player's keen eye, logic and memory.

== Development ==
A teaser trailer was released on 8 April 2015 and the full trailer was released later on 26 October 2015. The art style of the game was inspired by the works of Kevin Dart and Shag which combined a cartoonish style world with a retro 60's look, further added on with textures, furniture and architecture from the same era. Its initial working title was 'Snowy Village' with the art style more based on Fire Maple's "The Lost City" with the same mechanics as the final version. The art style was then changed into a more appealing theme that not only rooted from developer Mark White's own preference for the secret agent theme and his love for the Bond films, but fit accordingly to the mechanic of finding hidden clues and objects.

== Reception ==
Reception

Aggregate score
Aggregator	Score
Metacritic	iOS: 81/100; NS: 79/100

Review score
Publication	Score
TouchArcade	4/5

The iOS version has received "generally favourable reviews" according to video game review aggregator Metacritic. Despite many fans asking for a sequel Yak & Co took to Twitter on May 11, 2020 to say that "Nothing is planned yet, but it's possible." Fans have also commented on hopes for an Agent B game following the post-credits scene of Agent A.

Nintendo World Report reviewed the Switch version of the game and praised its setting, its visual style, the dialogues and the "simple but fun" puzzles. At the same time the magazine criticized the lack of "a serious challenge" and game features that the Switch port is missing.
