= Among the Sleep =

2014 video game

- Developer: Krillbite Studio
- Publisher: Krillbite Studio
- Producer: Ole Andreas Haley
- Designer: Anders Ugland
- Engine: Unity
- Platforms: Windows, OS X, Linux, PlayStation 4, Xbox One, Switch, Android, iOS
- Release: Windows, OS X, Linux; 29 May 2014; PS4; 10 December 2015; Xbox One; 3 June 2016; Enhanced Edition: Windows, OS X, Linux; 2 November 2017; Switch, PS4, Xbox One; 29 May 2019
- Genres: Survival horror, adventure
- Mode: Single-player

Among the Sleep is a 2014 first-person horror adventure video game developed by Norwegian developer Krillbite Studio for Microsoft Windows, OS X, Linux, PlayStation 4, and Xbox One. It was released on 29 May 2014 in North America for the PC. The PlayStation 4 version was released on 10 December 2015 while the Xbox One version was released on 3 June 2016. A definitive remaster titled Among The Sleep: Enhanced Edition was released for Windows on 2 November 2017, and later released for PS4, Xbox One and Nintendo Switch on 29 May 2019.

== Gameplay ==
Among the Sleep is a first-person exploration game seen from the view of a toddler. The player can move the cursor to walk or crawl around, the latter of which is faster and is required to slide through obstacles blocking the way. Running is an available option, though the player will fall down if it is done for too long. The player can interact with and push objects, and open doors and windows. Sometimes, the handle to open doors is too tall to reach for the player, in which case the player will have to push and climb chairs for additional height. Other than chairs, the player can climb boxes, tables, and various things to reach otherwise unreachable ledges and heights. Certain objects can also be held as well as thrown away. Others can be stored to the inventory and taken out again for later use.

For most of the game, the player is accompanied by a sentient teddy bear named Teddy, a birthday present from the toddler's father. The player can hug Teddy, who emits light that helps the player navigate through darker environments. If the player drops Teddy, which always happens whenever they arrive from sliding through pipes to a new level or environment, they will have to pick him up first before advancing again.

Throughout the game, the player is followed by two monsters: a feminine figure that haunts the first three levels, and a trench coat-wearing figure that haunts the final level. The monsters' appearance is indicated by the blurring of the vision, grating sounds, and in the case of the feminine figure, a slow lullaby (Trollmors Vuggesang, "Trollmother's Lullaby") hummed about. There is no way to fend off the monsters; if they appear, the player will have to run away or hide under tables or chairs until they go away. If the player is not quick enough to evade the monsters, a short cinematic will show the monsters taking hold of the player, which results in a game over, followed by a continue screen with a hanging pacifier. Touching the pacifier restarts the game from the last checkpoint. The player can get a game over by other means, such as falling into water or chasms.

The game is largely linear, though the expansive environment with multiple obstacles may induce the feeling of being lost. After some time exploring the player's house, the player is taken to a dreamlike location with a gingerbread house-like hut that serves as a sort of hub level. The house contains a circular door that leads to a new level, surrounded by four containers where "memories" obtained from each level are stored. After the player finds a memory and heads to a tube at the end of the level, they will be returned to this hut. Once four memories are stored, the player can insert Teddy's right hand below the circular door to return to the player's house.

In the extra downloadable content level, instead of exploring dreamlike locations, the player is taken to another house with the objective of finding and thawing five frozen dolls by playing music or turning on the TV. The gameplay is still the same, with the feminine figure haunting the player, but the player is also confronted by a fireplace monster in the underground section that advances and closes in through an aisle.

== Plot ==
Taking place during the 1990s, a toddler is celebrating their second birthday at their home with their mother. The party is then interrupted by a visitor at the front door who is hidden from the player, but the story suggests it is the toddler's father, who has divorced the mother. The conversation is muffled and partly kept from the toddler as the mother raises her voice, refusing the father's request to see his child. The mother's angry tone frightens the toddler, whose fear is presented as blurred vision. Quickly, the mother returns with a gift, but she does not say who the gift is from. Instead, she carries the toddler and the gift upstairs to their room, a place of bright, warm colors and streaming sunlight. The mother opens the gift, but looks at what is inside with a disdainful expression before shutting the gift box. Before the present is given to the toddler, the telephone rings, and the mother leaves the player in the bedroom to play alone. The gift is revealed to be a sentient teddy bear, who climbs out of the box and hides in the chest until the player finds him. The bear introduces himself as Teddy. Teddy has a friendly, curious nature. After a few minutes of playing together with a music box, a stuffed pink elephant, a storybook, and a toy train, they go into the closet, which turns out to be a large, dark room filled with long, dark-colored coats. Teddy says that if the toddler gets scared in the dark, they can hug him to help them feel safer. Once the player holds Teddy, he lights the way, acting like a flashlight. The small adventure is ended by the mother finding them; she tells the toddler, gently but ominously, to stop hiding from her and puts them to bed.

Later that night, Teddy is taken away from the toddler by an unseen force. The toddler goes after it and finds Teddy inside a washing machine. They unplug it and take him out. Teddy realizes that something is not right and that they must find the toddler's mother. Along the way, they encounter a shadowy figure. The search leads them to discover a slide that takes them to a small playhouse within the void, and the door found inside leads them into a journey through several surreal environments, consisting of an underground playground, a dilapidated mansion that has merged with a marshy forest, and a bizarre series of corridors created by hundreds of closets. Teddy instructs the toddler to find four memories they shared with their mother that will lead them to her. The memories take the form of four objects: The mother's pendant from her necklace shown at the start of the game, the music box she plays to put the toddler to sleep at night, the storybook, and the pink elephant. Throughout the search, the player is pursued by a large, feminine, troll-like monster and a creature with glowing white eyes, who has a coat as a body like the ones in the toddler's closet earlier.

After the last memory is found, Teddy and the toddler try to go through the slide that would lead back to the playhouse, but the coat monster grabs onto Teddy to stop the toddler from completing the last memory. The toddler hangs over an abyss and Teddy's arm is ripped off due to the toddler's weight. The player then falls into a dark place lit by a series of floodlights. The toddler follows the mother's voice and sees her drinking from a bottle as she transforms into the different monsters before disappearing. The toddler is left alone in the dark, with window lights coming up ahead, leading them back to the playhouse. After using the last memory and Teddy's torn arm to open the playhouse's door, the toddler sees cracks in a door that is straight ahead. Once through the door, the toddler is back in their room (having exited through the closet). The toddler heads downstairs to find their mother crying in the kitchen, with the damaged Teddy in one hand, and an empty wine bottle in the other, which she drops. When the toddler attempts to retrieve Teddy, the mother pushes the toddler away and snaps at them to leave her alone. She apologizes and tells the toddler she did not mean to, and that it is too much. The player has the option of briefly comforting the mother if they interact with her again.

There is a knock at the front door that the mother does not react to like she did before; instead, she continues to sob. When the toddler goes to the door, it opens and reveals a glowing white light. The father is heard talking to the toddler, remarking on Teddy's broken arm, stating that he can fix him. It is implied that the father wins permanent custody of the toddler after the game ends.

=== Prologue ===
An expansion level available through downloadable content is set before the events of the main story, again told from the toddler's point of view. The toddler is wandering through a winter environment and finds five dolls surrounding a light that breaks, sending the player to a house different from the one shown in the main story. The player is required to locate and thaw the five dolls that are frozen due to the freezing wind from outside coming through the open windows, which involves closing the windows and using music and TV to free them. Throughout the house, bright flashback figures of the toddler's parents are shown arguing due to the mother's alcohol abuse because she felt neglected for taking care of the toddler by herself while her husband was working all day to gain enough money to support themselves and their child, one flashback shows that he hits her when she collapses to the floor (implying he was protecting the toddler from the mother's drunken state, resulting of the divorce). Along the way, the toddler encounters monsters from the main story, and a furnace monster in the basement. Once the player finds all of the dolls, including the rabbit one found outside the house after it has fallen from a window, the mother is seen taking the toddler before going away in depression, implying that the house is her husband's house and that the mother is taking the toddler to the house seen in the main story, leaving the doll out in the cold.

=== Alternate ending ===
This 'bad ending' was scrapped from the story but was placed in the enhanced edition of the game. The ending can be accessed at the Museum level. The toddler wakes up in a broken-down, cage-like crib in an unknown area. They see Teddy turning a wheel, where the crib is being held, revealing a room with lifeless dolls, all memory items, and a giant cooking pot. The crib stops moving and Teddy walks creepily towards the toddler, "happily" greeting them with black eyes. From that moment, his neck cracks and giant skeleton-like hands emerge from his body, revealing his true ghostly form "The Nightmare". It turns out The Nightmare has been using young children to collect beloved items to create a stew by disguising them as stuffed toys and tricking children to venture far from their homes and to his hideout. He prepares his meal by placing all the items in the pot and stirring them while reciting the quotes from the toddler's book. He then congratulates the toddler, grabs them, and drops them into the boiling water ready to be devoured.

== Development ==
Development of Among the Sleep began in 2011, and attracted 225,000 NOK (€28,000) on 27 May and 200,000 NOK (€25,000) on 28 October in 2011 in funding from the Norsk Film Institutt (Norwegian Film Institute) The NFI awarded the company a supplementary 400,000 NOK (€50,000) on 1 March and another 820,000 NOK (€102,700) on 1 November in 2012.

Krillbite Studio gained subsidies by launching a Kickstarter campaign at 18 April 2013, where they managed to pledge $248,358 of a $200,000 target. Achieved stretch goals included a commentary track, downloadable content developed in collaboration with backers, and support for the Oculus Rift virtual reality headset.

== Reception ==
Reception

Aggregate scores
Aggregator	Score
Metacritic	PC: 66/100; PS4: 66/100; XONE: 62/100
OpenCritic	23% recommend

Review scores
Publication	Score
Adventure Gamers	PC: 3/5
Destructoid	PS4: 8/10
Eurogamer	4/10
Game Informer	7.75/10
GameSpot	7/10
GamesRadar+	PS4: 3/5
IGN	7.3/10
Joystiq	4/5
PC Gamer (US)	60/100
Polygon	7/10

Among the Sleep was met with mixed reviews, receiving 7/10 from both GameSpot and Polygon, and accruing an average score of 66 out of 100 on Metacritic. Fellow review aggregator OpenCritic assessed that the game received fair approval, being recommended by 23% of critics.

As of 7 March 2015 over 100,000 copies of the game had been sold.

== Notes ==
1. Chalk, Andy (31 May 2012). "Stay Awake Among the Sleep". The Escapist. Archived from the original on 12 December 2013.
2. Johnson, Stephen (29 May 2012). "Among The Sleep: Horror Game From A Baby's Point-Of-View". G4TV.
3. Hilliard, Kyle (29 May 2012). "Among The Sleep". Game Informer. Archived from the original on 1 June 2012.
4. Smith, Adam (29 May 2012). "Wild Things Still Roam: Among The Sleep". Rock, Paper, Shotgun.
5. Mitchell, Richard (29 May 2012). "Among the Sleep, a horror game played through the eyes of a child". Joystiq. Archived from the original on 22 December 2012.
6. Totilo, Stephen (29 May 2012). "A Horror Game In Which You Play as a Two-Year Old". Kotaku.
7. Hafer, T. J. (30 May 2012). "Among The Sleep is a first-person horror game that has you play as a two-year-old". PC Gamer.
8. Denton, Jon (3 July 2012). "Among The Sleep Preview: They Mostly Come At Night". Eurogamer.
9. Khaw, Cassandra (29 May 2012). "Trailer: Among The Sleep (Krillbrite Studios)". Indie Games: The Weblog. Archived from the original on 3 August 2012.
10. Grayson, Nathan (27 June 2012). "Why Among The Sleep's Toddler Lead Isn't Just For Shock". Rock, Paper, Shotgun.
11. O'Connor, Alice (29 May 2012). "Among The Sleep reveals childhood horrors". Shacknews.
12. Sterling, Jim (29 May 2012). "Traumatize a two-year-old in Among the Sleep". Destructoid.
13. Dutton, Fred (29 May 2012). "Play as a 2-year-old in first person horror Among the Sleep". Eurogamer.
14. Maxwell, Ben (29 May 2012). "Childhood nightmares in Among The Sleep". Edge Magazine.
