= All Walls Must Fall =

2018 video game

- Developer: Inbetweengames
- Publishers: Inbetweengames; Ultimate Games (Switch)
- Engine: Unreal Engine
- Platforms: Linux; macOS; Windows; Nintendo Switch
- Release: WIN, MAC, LIN; WW: February 23, 2018; Switch; WW: January 20, 2021
- Genre: Turn-based tactics
- Mode: Single-player

All Walls Must Fall is a turn-based tactics video game developed by Inbetweengames, who published it in 2018 for Windows, macOS, and Linux. Ultimate Games published it on Switch in 2021. It received mixed reviews.

== Gameplay ==
In 2089, time-traveling agents attempt to stop a nuclear attack in a version of Berlin where the Cold War never ended. In each mission, players must infiltrate a gay dance club. Players can bluff, hack, or fight their way in. If they anger someone by choosing incorrect dialogue choices or are discovered, they can go back in time and try again. Players may also stay in place as time reverses around them, which gives the impression to outsiders that they are teleporting.

Players can thus repeatedly guess responses to talk their way into the club, disregarding wrong responses. Then they can trigger alarms and fight battles to get into well-guarded areas. Once there, they can reverse time around themselves so that the alarm never rang and battle never took place, though they remain in the restricted area.

Combat is turn-based. After the battle, players can see a real-time re-enactment of the combat aligned with the beats of the music in the club. If the player's agent is fatally wounded, they can reverse time to try again. In combat, this can also cause bullets to reverse their trajectory, saving the player's life, or have ejected bullets re-enter the gun, making a reload unnecessary. Between missions, players can purchase advanced time-travel abilities and new weapons.

== Development ==
Inbetweengames was founded by three developers who formerly worked for Yager Development. When their publisher abruptly moved Dead Island 2 to another developer, they decided to develop games independently. The maps combine handmade pieces using procedural generation. The music-related elements were inspired by Rez, Crypt of the NecroDancer, and John Wick. Inbetweengames was inspired to make a turn-based tactics game using an isometric point of view by X-COM: UFO Defense, Syndicate, and Fallout. Time-travel was initially implemented so players could undo actions, and it was expanded into a core mechanic as development continued.

All Walls Must Fall was crowdfunded via Kickstarter in March 2017 and entered early access in August. It was released on Linux, macOS, and Windows on February 23, 2018. Ultimate Games published a Nintendo Switch port on January 20, 2021. The Windows version became freeware in July 2024.

== Reception ==
Reception

Aggregate score
| Aggregator | Score |
|---|---|
| Metacritic | 72/100 |

Review score
| Publication | Score |
|---|---|
| PC Gamer (US) | 72/100 |

All Walls Must Fall received mixed reviews on Metacritic. Rock Paper Shotgun called it "a bloody good time-troubling tactical shooter". They felt the game's narrow focus gave it a better cyberpunk atmosphere than other contemporary works but said it also limited the game's replay value. They also found some bugs but recommended the game regardless. In recommending the game, Eurogamer wrote, "Witty and wonderfully scrappy, turn-based combat has never looked quite like this before." Though they praised the atmosphere and theme, PC Gamer called it "a terrific elevator pitch with a wonky execution".
