= Aaero =

Rhythm action rail shooter video game

- Developer: Mad Fellows
- Publisher: Mad Fellows
- Designer: Paul Norris
- Programmer: Daniel Horbury
- Artists: Paul Norris, Kostas Michalopoulos
- Engine: Unity
- Platforms: Xbox One, PlayStation 4, Microsoft Windows, Nintendo Switch
- Release: Windows, PlayStation 4, Xbox One; April 11, 2017; Nintendo Switch; December 24, 2018
- Genres: Action; rhythm
- Mode: Single-player

Aaero is a rhythm action rail shooter video game developed by the two person British independent video game developer Mad Fellows. Aaero was released on Xbox One, PlayStation 4 and Microsoft Windows, via Steam, on April 11, 2017. Aaero: Complete Edition, a version with downloadable content and other add-ons was released for the Nintendo Switch on December 24, 2018. It was released in Japan on December 27, 2018. A sequel, Aaero 2, released in 2024 for Steam and Xbox Series X/S.

== Gameplay ==
The basic controls are that of a twin-stick shooter, the left stick controlling the ship while the right controls targeting.

Mike Fahey of Kotaku says: "Aaero sees players navigating through alien environments in a futuristic flying craft. As the music plays, ribbons of light bend and twist in the air, visualizing aspects of the song. Sometimes it's vocals. Sometimes it's strange electronic wails. Using the left analog stick (required even in the PC version), players must grind against those ribbons in order to absorb the energy of the music."

He goes on to describe the shooting element of the gameplay: "The game's tunnel-like environments warp and twist to impede the player, each new level bringing unique obstacles and traps into play. Odd mechanical enemies attack from time to time, with the game employing a target lock and fire mechanic using a combination of right analog and trigger."

In his review for Forbes, Mitch Wallace describes the gameplay: "The general on-rail, twin-stick shooting setup is deceptively simple: Pilot a spaceship through various alien and possibly post-apocalyptic stages, gunning down enemies and tracing ribbons of light as you go."

== Reception ==
According to the video game review aggregator website Metacritic, Aaero received "generally favourable" reviews and a score of 77 on PlayStation 4, 80 on Xbox One and 83 on the Nintendo Switch.

Kotaku's Mike Fahey said "Aaero came to my attention yesterday evening, after our managing editor, Riley MacLeod, sent me the following message: "Yo I'm playing this new rhythm game Aaero and you should check it out!" So I checked it out, fell in love, and figured I would pass the word along."

Forbes contributor Mitch Wallace gave Aaero a score of 9.5/10 and commented "For the most part, the wait between quality, innovative, and original music games is rather unbearable. But once in a blue moon, let's say on a somewhat unassuming April day, the gaming clouds split open and down floats something like Aaero.
