= Agony (2018 video game) =

- Developer: Madmind Studio
- Publishers: PlayWay; Forever Entertainment (Switch)
- Director: Tomasz Dutkiewicz
- Producers: Krzysztof Kostowski; Jakub Trzebiński
- Designers: Jakub Grabka; Wojciech Babiński; Tomasz Dutkiewicz
- Programmer: Daniel Witek
- Artist: Tomasz Dutkiewicz
- Writer: Tomasz Dutkiewicz
- Composer: Draco Nared
- Engine: Unreal Engine 4
- Platforms: PlayStation 4; Windows; Xbox One; Nintendo Switch
- Release: PS4, Windows, Xbox One; 29 May 2018; Nintendo Switch; 31 October 2019
- Genre: Survival horror
- Mode: Single-player

Agony is a 2018 dark fantasy survival horror video game developed by Polish developer Madmind Studio and published by PlayWay. Players begin their journey as a tormented soul within the depths of hell without any memories about his past. The special ability to control people on their path, and possess weak-minded demons, gives players the necessary measures to survive in the extreme conditions they are in. The game received generally unfavorable reviews.

== Gameplay ==
The game is played from a first-person perspective. The player controls one of the martyrs condemned to hell, Amraphel (aka Nimrod) tasked with meeting the Red Goddess, one of the creators of hell, in an effort to escape and return to the land of the living. Unlike other martyrs, the player possesses the unique ability to possess both other martyrs and, later in the game, lesser and higher demons, giving them access to special abilities. Using mechanics such as crouching and holding their breath, the player can avoid demons. Besides hiding, the player needs to solve puzzles in order to unlock new areas. There are available hidden statues that the player can collect, as well as paintings which are possible to discover.

== Plot ==
The story follows a lost soul trapped in hell without any memory of his former life. From what is revealed of the protagonist's backstory, he was a king of an ancient land who made a Faustian bargain with the Red Goddess. In-story, he is referred to as both Nimrod by the goddess and Amraphel by other condemned souls, some of whom still have their memories, blaming the protagonist for them being damned to hell because of the acts he committed while alive. As the protagonist wanders through the wastelands of hell, he discovers a possibility of escaping through the aid of the Red Goddess. Determined, he travels to the Red Goddess' lair to learn how he can be set free.

If the player obeys the Red Goddess's commands, they will ultimately venture to the lowest depths of hell, provoking a creature known only as the Beast. Sufficiently wearing down the Beast, the protagonist is able to possess it, using its power to break the seals binding it to the lower depths. Satisfied, the Red Goddess reveals herself as the Whore of Babylon and vows to use the Beast to begin the Apocalypse. The protagonist is returned to the living world, per his deal, only to be killed by the Beast moments later as the Red Goddess begins her conquest of Earth, leaving the player's soul to return to hell.

The story features multiple other endings, dependent on how the player progresses and the choices they make. However, only two of these are canonical.

== Development ==
=== Concept and fundraiser ===
The first concept video was created by Tomasz Dutkiewicz in 2015. His vision was inspired by Dante's Inferno and his research into the topic. The popularity of his video encouraged him to create another one with his colleagues which helped "explain the original vision and atmosphere of the game". With the help of fans and investors, he created Madmind Studio and development began in January 2016.

In November 2016, the developers of Agony started a Kickstarter campaign to fund the creation of the game. The Kickstarter campaign surpassed its goal and ended in December 2016. The game was originally scheduled for a release on 30 March 2018, but was delayed to 29 May 2018.

=== Development ===
In January 2017, Madmind CEO Tomasz Dutkiewicz, in an interview with GamingBolt, explained they felt horror games "lost their uniqueness" by increasingly focusing on action and traditional themes, eventually becoming "clones of others, bringing nothing new to the genre", so they wanted to "go back to the roots of horror" by choosing Hell as setting. Divine Comedy's detailed descriptions inspired the visuals but the team could not rely only on well-known concepts if they wanted to surprise the player. First person perspective was chosen for its immersion, well established in "[t]itles like Outlast or Amnesia". At this point multiple endings were only considered. The team's experience with Unreal Engine 4 made it a natural choice for development. Dutkiewicz estimated the release in the "[s]econd quarter of 2017".

=== Content rating and release ===
To avoid receiving an "Adults Only" (AO) rating from the ESRB (which would make it impossible to fulfill the Kickstarter campaign's promise that Agony would be released for the PlayStation 4 and Xbox One, since the makers of those consoles disallowed AO-rated games), the developers modified some of the content, aiming for a "Mature" (M) rating. They promised that nothing seen in previews or trailers for Agony would be censored, that they would immediately release an optional patch for the PC version that would restore any censored content, and that Kickstarter backers who chose to receive a PlayStation 4 or Xbox One version could switch their reward to the PC version if desired.

However, the planned patch was later dropped due to "legal issues". On 6 June 2018, the developers said they were "talking with Steam representatives" about offering Agony Unrated, an updated version of the game with the censored content restored, as "a separate title produced and published by Madmind Studio and without the involvement of any publishers." Agony Unrated was released on Steam on 31 October 2018. It contains various quality of life improvements such as updated graphics and character models, new gameplay mechanics and enemies, and new endings. Those who backed the Kickstarter campaign received Agony Unrated for free, and those who already owned the original game could purchase Agony Unrated for a 90% discount, with the developers explaining, "We are aware that the premiere of our first game was disappointing for many players, as numerous technical errors and censored content effectively distracted from the game."

=== Other versions ===
On 5 September 2018, Madmind Studio announced a partnership with Forever Entertainment to bring Agony to Nintendo Switch. It was released on 31 October 2019.

On 6 November 2020, Ignibit announced their partnership with Agony developer MadMind Studio to bring the game to VR. It was released on 5 April 2023.

== Reception ==
Reception

Aggregate score
Aggregator	Score
Metacritic	47/100 (PC); 37/100 (PS4); 34/100 (XONE)

Review scores
Publication	Score
Eurogamer	7/10
Game Informer	3.5/10
GameRevolution	2.5/5
GameSpot	3/10
IGN	4/10
Jeuxvideo.com	6/20
MeriStation	6/10

Agony was met with "generally unfavorable reviews", according to Metacritic.

IGN's David Jagneaux described the game as a combination of ambitious horror art and repetitive gameplay. "[B]old and detailed environments depict Hell in the most nightmarish ways possible" with "graphic obscenity" that is "grotesquely appealing to horror-loving gamers" but its overuse of gore eventually makes the player desensitized to the experience. He explained: "you really can reach a point where all [...] starts to look the same and it no longer bothers you". The gameplay also has its shortcomings: "save points are scattered sporadically", slow movement and repetitive tasks. Critical information about the possession system is not communicated clearly which leads to frequent deaths and retries, making the game longer than its content would require. "This eight to 10-hour journey could have been cut in half without losing any of the meat."

GameSpot's Justin Clark also recognized the game's depiction of Hell as a "breathtaking achievement" calling it a "heretical province of terror" with architecture that is a "pulsating gothic nightmare". Enemy design is "disappointing and predictable" compared to the world: Doom-like demons and stereotypically sexual female variants with bad voice acting. Clark also noted the slow movement, difficult sneaking and challenging enemies that lead to frequent deaths. These issues are not helped by the rarity of checkpoints: "Agony treats basic progressional milestones the way most games treat obscure collectibles." Navigational difficulties, searching for objects and backtracking add to the repetitiveness of the game, during which the player "grows numb" to the "grim wonder that strikes you in the beginning".

The Escapist's Ben "Yahtzee" Croshaw in his Zero Punctuation review referred to it as "liquidized offal". He specifically criticized the unforgiving stealth mechanics as well as the game's overuse of gore, stating: "... environments are simultaneously too busy and extremely boring; turn things up to eleven and stay there, and it's just as dull as staying at one." He later ranked it as the second worst game of 2018.

Famitsu's Brzrk noted similarities to Alien: Isolation, but found the game's subject matter and unfamiliar religious viewpoints hard to understand, even with reading some of the subtitles. Though he found the gameplay disappointing, he lauded the depiction of hell and liked the game as a work of art.

== Spin-off games ==
A spin-off game titled Succubus was announced by Madmind in December 2018. It centers on playing a succubus, Vydija, as she seeks revenge and a task set by Nimrod: gather Baphomet's tongue. In July 2020, Succubus: Prologue, a free demo was made available. The final game was released in October 2021. As of January 2025 the game has attracted little attention from critics but user scores on Metacritic and Steam indicate much improvement over Agony. The Red Goddess DLC added two new levels to the story in Dec 2022. A Switch port was announced to be in development by Console Labs but was later cancelled.

Another spin-off game titled Agony: Lords of Hell was officially announced in December 2021. The game was to be set between the events of Agony and Succubus and expand upon the fate of the protagonist of the former game and Vydija who is the protagonist of the latter. Unlike its predecessors, Lords of Hell is a strategy/city-building game, inspired by the Populous series, in which the player assumes the role of Nimrod as king of Hell to expand his territory by commanding his army through Vydija. A playable demo was available between 14 and 26 April 2023. In February 2024 development was put on hold in favor of another upcoming game.

In January 2026 Madmind changed its scope to publishing only, soon followed by the resignation of CEO Tomasz Dutkiewicz and the company filing for bankruptcy. Madmind estimated its losses on their final projects (Paranoid and Tormentor) to be over PLN 4 million (US$ 1 million).
