= The Academy: The First Riddle =

2020 video game

- Developer: Pine Studio
- Publisher: Snapbreak Games
- Platform: macOS; Microsoft Windows
- Release: June 19, 2020
- Genre: Puzzle adventure game
- Mode: Single-player

The Academy: The First Riddle is a puzzle adventure game developed by Pine Studios and published by Snapbreak Games. It was developed in Croatia and released on June 19, 2020 for Microsoft Windows, macOS, iOS, and Android.

== Reception ==
Reception

Aggregate scores
Aggregator	Score
Metacritic	(PC) 59/100
OpenCritic	29% recommend

Review scores
Publication	Score
Adventure Gamers	3/5
Pocket Gamer	3/5
Shacknews	6/10

The game received mixed reviews, its PC version scoring 59 on Metacritic from an aggregate of 9 reviews. Fellow review aggregator OpenCritic assessed that the game received weak approval, being recommended by 29% of critics. Peter Mattsson of Adventure Gamers gave it three stars out of five, citing awkward and limited puzzle mechanics but praising its visuals and duration. Pocket Gamer was similar in its verdict, praising its mysterious and vibrant setting, but criticized the controls and puzzles, also giving it three out of five stars. Shacknews gave it 6 out of 10, criticizing the characters and dialogue as unexciting.
