= The Almost Gone =

2020 video game

- Developer: Happy Volcano
- Publisher: Playdigious
- Platforms: Android; iOS; macOS; Nintendo Switch; Windows
- Release: Android: WW: 15 June 2020; iOS, Macintosh, Windows, Switch: WW: 25 June 2020
- Genre: Puzzle

The Almost Gone is a 2020 video game created by independent developer Happy Volcano and published by Playdigious. The game is a puzzle game in which the player investigates and rotates three-dimensional rooms to uncover the story of Emily, a girl who has recently died, and unearth the secrets of her family. Upon release, the game received mixed reviews, with critics praising the game's visual presentation and exploration of serious themes, while critiquing the execution of its narrative and aspects of its gameplay. During development and release, The Almost Gone received several accolades from European independent game events, including awards for 'Game of the Year' at the 2021 Flanders DC Belgian Game Awards.

== Gameplay ==
The user interface highlights areas of interest to display items or narrative elements.

The Almost Gone is a puzzle game with room escape elements in which the player navigates five stages of three-dimensional dioramas of rooms to locate items of interest and solve puzzles. The player can rotate the room in all directions to see behind objects and corners of the space, and can enter other rooms using doors or directional arrows. Items can be combined and accessed using an inventory, with objects of interest, once acquired, highlighted at the side of the screen, with some providing additional background text. The game also features a map to show the player the current perspective and relationship between rooms.

== Plot ==
The player follows Emily, a girl who has recently died, through a state of purgatory as she revisits places and events significant to her life. As the player pieces together connections from the locations across Emily's house and neighborhood, darker secrets about Emily's life family become unearthed, revealing themes of "addiction, abuse, neglect and murder".

== Development ==
The Almost Gone was developed by Happy Volcano, a Belgian independent studio founded by developer Peter Maasen, designer Jeroen Janssen, and art director David Prinsmel, featuring text by writer Joost Vandecasteele. The development team aimed to create a puzzle game that was integrated with a more mature, dark narrative around the theme of life and death. The narrative was left ambiguous as a "Lynchian experience" to encourage players to develop their own thoughts and theories about the game.

== Reception ==
Reception

Aggregate scores
Aggregator	Score
Metacritic	67/100
OpenCritic	62% recommend

Review scores
Publication	Score
Adventure Gamers	3.5/5
Destructoid	7/10
IGN	8.5
Nintendo Life	8/10
Pocket Gamer	4/5
The Guardian	3/5

The Almost Gone received "mixed or average" reviews, according to review aggregator Metacritic. Fellow review aggregator OpenCritic assessed that the game received fair approval, being recommended by 62% of critics. Reviewers mostly praised the game's minimalistic visual presentation and design. Eurogamer found the "clean, undisturbed lines of an architect's drawing" to convey a "striking" visual presentation. Critics viewed the art as dissonant from the dark tone of the game, with Pocket Gamer writing that the "minimalist, almost cartoonish art lulls you into a false sense of security". Nintendo Life highlighted the game's minimalistic design aided the puzzles, which were "carefully crafted to communicate areas of importance, whilst leaving out any unnecessary clutter". Adventure Gamers praised the game's design as "simple, clean and effective".

Critics were mixed about the game's puzzle design. The Guardian commended the game's puzzles as "succinct" and "impressively disciplined". IGN Korea found the execution of the puzzles to be effective and challenging, although critiqued the frustration of lacking support for hints and the game's perspective to be difficult to understand and navigate. Eurogamer viewed the puzzles as "clunky", citing the solutions as being "on the nose", reliant on "total non-sequiturs", and "mindless clicking around". Adventure Gamers found the navigation of rooms "frustrating", reliant on backtracking due to the constantly changing sense of direction, and observed the use of empty space made it difficult to identify objects and areas of importance.

Critics were also mixed on the game's writing, subject matter and tone. Nintendo Life described the narrative as compelling and "carefully considered". Adventure Gamers viewed the narrative to be "effective" and employed "thoughtful use of metaphor", although noting the game's themes were unable to be deeply examined due to its short length. Pocket Gamer wrote that the "dark and emotional" tone of the game was "poignant" and similarly compelling, although found the ambiguous ending of the game to "fall flat". The Guardian found the game's breadth of complex themes and "opaque ending" made the game unsatisfying and unfocused. Similarly, Eurogamer described the narrative as "clod-hopping and cliched". Rock Paper Shotgun commended the game's approach to its subject matter, but observed "the grimness of the storyline can get ahead of itself, and the writing gets a bit too cliché for its own good". Several reviews also viewed the game's translation limited the effect of its writing.

=== Accolades ===
The Almost Gone received several accolades at European independent games industry shows, including being awarded the 'Most Innovative Game' of the 2018 Casual Connect Europe Indie Prize Awards, the 'Best Desktop/Downloadable Game' at the 2018 Game Connection Europe Development Awards, and the 'PC/Console Game of the Year' and 'Mobile Game of the Year' at the 2021 Flanders DC Belgian Game Awards.
