= Achilles: Legends Untold =

- Developer: Dark Point Games
- Publisher: Dark Point Games
- Platforms: PlayStation 5; Windows; Xbox Series X/S; PlayStation 4; Xbox One; Nintendo Switch
- Release: Windows,PlayStation 5, Xbox Series X/S; November 2, 2023; PlayStation 4, Xbox One; September 18, 2024; Nintendo Switch; January 23, 2025
- Genre: Action role-playing
- Mode: Single-player

Achilles: Legends Untold is a 2023 action role-playing game by Dark Point Games in which players control the Greek mythological hero Achilles.

== Gameplay ==
Players control the mythological hero Achilles. After Achilles' death during the Trojan War, Hades sends him back to Greece. Players perform quests for Hades, such as finding the missing god Hephaestus. Combat follows Soulslike conventions. Players can attack enemies using combos limited by their stamina. By expending tokens, players can unlock special abilities in a skill tree.

== Development ==
Dark Point Games, a Polish studio, released Achilles: Legends Untold to early access in May 2022. Dark Point Games released Achilles: Legends Untold for Windows, PlayStation 5, and Xbox Series X/S on November 2, 2023. The game was later ported to PlayStation 4 and Xbox One on September 18, 2024 and to Nintendo Switch on January 23, 2025.

== Reception ==
Achilles: Legends Untold received mixed reviews on Metacritic. Fellow review aggregator OpenCritic assessed that the game received fair approval, being recommended by 46% of critics. IGN called the early access version "undercooked and fairly broken" shortly after its launch. After the full release, GamingBolt praised the concept of combining Soulslike combat with Diablo-style loot, but they said the execution falls short.
