= Adventures of Pip =

2015 platform video game

- Developer: Tic Toc Games
- Publisher: Tic Toc Games
- Composer: Jake Kaufman
- Engine: Unity
- Platforms: Windows, OS X, Wii U, PlayStation 4, Xbox One, iOS, Switch, Android
- Release: June 4, 2015: Windows, OS X June 4, 2015 Wii U; NA: June 4, 2015; EU: January 21, 2016 iOS July 2, 2015 PlayStation 4, Xbox One; NA: August 18, 2015 (PS4); NA: August 21, 2015 (XOne); EU: February 9, 2016 Switch September 10, 2020
- Genre: Platform
- Mode: Single-player

Adventures of Pip is a platform game developed and published by Tic Toc Games. The game launched in June 2015 for Microsoft Windows, OS X, and Wii U and in July 2015 for iOS. Xbox One and PlayStation 4 versions were released in August 2015, and the Nintendo Switch version in September 2020.

== Gameplay ==
In Adventures of Pip, the player plays as Pip, a single pixel born into a world of hi-res and lo-res characters. As Pip defeats his enemies, he gains the ability to evolve into an 8-bit hero and later a 16-bit hero. Each evolution has its advantages and disadvantages. Pip must switch between his evolutions to complete levels. Players will need to evolve and devolve, wall jump, run, shove, break blocks, float, collect, and fight their way through bosses and henchmen till they get to the Evil Queen DeRezia.

== Plot ==
An evil witch has come and turned the King and Queen into pixels and kidnapped Princess Adeline. It is up to Pip to venture forth and navigate the strange landscapes to rescue the damsel in distress from the clutches of Queen DeRezzia.

== Reception ==
Reception

Aggregate score
Aggregator	Score
Metacritic	(iOS) 88/100 (Wii U) 78/100 (PS4) 74/100 (PC) 72/100 (NS) 71/100 (XOne) 70/100

Review scores
Publication	Score
Destructoid	(PC) 7/10
Electronic Gaming Monthly	(Wii U) 8/10
GameZone	(Wii U) 8.5/10
Hardcore Gamer	(Wii U) 4/5
Jeuxvideo.com	15/20
Nintendo Life	(Wii U) 8/10 (NS) 6/10
Nintendo World Report	(Wii U) 8/10 (NS) 7/10
Push Square	(PS4) 7/10
TouchArcade	(iOS) 4.5/5

The iOS and Wii U versions received "generally favorable reviews", while the PC, PlayStation 4, Xbox One and Switch versions received "mixed or average reviews", according to the review aggregation website Metacritic.

Dermot Creegan of Hardcore Gamer called the Wii U version "a delightful little platformer full of charm, challenge and impeccable level design." Andrew Fitch of EGMNow said of the same Wii U version, "Tic Toc Games' impressive pedigree at WayForward is on full display in Adventures of Pip—one of the only problems is that it's not quite as feature-rich as you'd like."
