= Afterfall: Insanity =

2011 video game

- Developer: Intoxicate Studios
- Publisher: Nicolas Entertainment Group
- Composers: Marcin Przybyłowicz; Arkadiusz Reikowski
- Engine: Unreal Engine 3
- Platform: Microsoft Windows
- Release: WW: 25 November 2011
- Genres: Survival horror, third-person shooter
- Mode: Single-player

Afterfall: Insanity is a post-apocalyptic video game developed by Intoxicate Studios and published by Nicolas Entertainment Group. It was released for Microsoft Windows on 25 November 2011.

== Synopsis ==
=== Setting ===
In the Afterfall universe, World War II ended differently. In the final moments of the war, German Führer Adolf Hitler managed to create his Wunderwaffe—a team of Nazi physicists who finished the German atomic bomb project. In January 1945, a V-2 rocket armed with a nuclear warhead fell on the Soviet army that was preparing to cross the Polish-German border. Military activities were stopped, and truce talks began. During these talks, first, the United States and then the Soviet Union developed their own nuclear weapons. The border between Germany and Poland was not ultimately set and the Armia Krajowa announced the creation of New Poland. In the aftermath of the treaties between Germany, the United States, and the Soviet Union, New Poland became a buffer zone with United States military bases spread around its territory. Thus began the global Cold War.

The United States invested heavily in the development of Poland, especially its military-industrial complex. Poland east of the Vistula and San –the Socialist Republic of Eastern Poland, was under Soviet influence, and Warsaw, its capital, was surrounded by the Warsaw Wall. In 1960, the rebellious Soviet General Kaiser launched a nuclear missile aimed at one of the Soviet military bases in former Eastern Poland. The Kaiser announced that if the Soviet Union would not fulfill his demands, he has 16 more of those missiles to fire. Extorted, the Soviet Union withdrew from the occupied part of Poland and Western Ukraine; Kaiser was proclaimed the Head of State and the era of totalitarian Poland began. The United States officially withdrew its army from Polish territories, but secret negotiations continued concerning further financial support and technological exchange.

In 2011, Germany completed the development of a new bomb. Its real power was a mystery even to the bomb's creators. One year later, a bomb code-named "Entropy" exploded over the English Channel. Whether by accident or part of an intentional action remains a mystery. As a result, all of the rockets throughout the Cold War theater locked onto their targets and were fired at the same time. World War III became a fact; no one had time to ponder over the first explosion. Some people managed to hide in underground shelters which were a part of vast military complexes. Decades passed before the first tentative expeditions were sent to the surface.

The year is now 2035. About 20 years ago, the citizens of The Republic had to search for shelter from the hell of the Third World War, yet only a few were fortunate enough to have a place waiting for them in the prepared shelters. With the passage of time, the fear of death on the surface became only an unpleasant memory; however, the seemingly safe hideout turned out to be a curse that could not be escaped. It was only a matter of time before somebody snapped, and thus the paradise of safety became a nightmare of imprisonment.

=== Plot ===
The protagonist of Afterfall: InSanity is Albert Tokaj, a member of a medical team that takes care of the mental and physical well-being of citizens living in the shelter Glory. He specializes in the mental disorder called confinement syndrome caused by being locked up for too long, yet he himself is not free of its symptoms. When all hell begins to break loose, Albert has to find the answers to many questions, the where and the why, who is a real enemy, and who is a trusted friend. He will have to face the dangers lurking in the darkness of the shelter and within his own mind, battling weakness and fear.

== Development ==
Afterfall was originally conceived as a post-apocalyptic role-playing game in the vein of the Fallout and the S.T.A.L.K.E.R. franchises, but was later turned into a survival horror title. It started development as a project by Polish fans of games such as Fallout and S.T.A.L.K.E.R. but was professionalized under Nicolas Entertainment Group in mid-2008. It uses Unreal Engine 3, making it compatible with both Windows and Linux. During development, the game was titled as Bourgeoisie: Pearl of the Wastelands, Rascal and Afterfall.

== Marketing and release ==
The developers partnered with CD Projekt to publish the game in Poland. The game was earlier slated for release in the first quarter of 2011, however it was delayed to the last quarter of 2011 in March 2011. In October 2011, Nicolas Games announced that the game would be available for one dollar if the game reached a total of 10 million pre-orders, with players getting the right to download the game from peer-to-peer networks such as torrent while 10% of the collected money will go to charity. If they fell short of that goal, they would donate all the money to a charity group. In this case, players would have to buy it a higher price but they will receive a bonus soundtrack. Although Amnesty International was initially selected to be the recipient of the money, the charity organization declined to be part of the program stating that the game's brutality isn't compatible with Amnesty's ideology. As the campaign failed to reach its goal, those who pre-ordered the game as part of the campaign received it at 50% discount along with the free soundtrack. Some of the money from the campaign was announced to be donated to a charity as per the choice of the buyers.

A demo was issued on 15 November. A trailer showcasing environments of the game was released a few days later. The game was released on 25 November 2011 for Windows. A boxed version and a Collector's Edition was released exclusively in Poland. The collector's edition contains an Afterfall themed backpack, soundtrack of the game on a CD, 2 CDs with music inspired by the game, a 140-page encyclopedia about the Afterfall universe, a T-shirt with the logo of the game and a calendar for 2012 containing various screenshots of the game. The game was released for OnLive on 21 December.

== Downloadable content ==
A DLC titled Dirty Arena was announced in December 2012, available free with the game and was slated to be released in February 2013. Dirty Arena is similar to the survival modes found in many games in which the player character has to survive seemingly endless waves of enemies. Also there are periodic mini-boss and boss fights. On 15 February, the DLC was announced to be releasing for the Steam version on 22 February 2013. It was released exclusively for the Steam version on the announced date. Dirty Arena was released as a stand-alone game under the title Afterfall Insanity: Dirty Arena Edition on 9 May 2013. The second map for Dirty Arena called Afterfall: Dirty Arena - Second Strike was released on Steam for free on 20 September 2013.

== Extended edition ==
An extended edition of the game was announced in March 2012. The extended edition was intended to be released on Xbox 360 alongside Windows. Players who purchased the Windows version of the original game or would purchase it were announced to be getting the edition in form of a patch to the original. The edition was revealed to contain improvements in visual aspects, technical aspects as well as the combat system. The gameplay and storytelling was improved and rebalanced while a new weapon was added.

In mid-July, the release date of the patch was revealed to be 26 July 2012. However it was instead released on 27 July. It was greenlit on Steam in October 2012 and was released on Steam on 3 December 2012.

== Reception ==
Reception

Aggregate scores
Aggregator	Score
GameRankings	48%
Metacritic	50/100

Review scores
Publication	Score
Eurogamer	5/10
GameSpot	6/10
IGN	4.5/10
Inside Gaming	7.5/10
GameStar	6/10

The reviews for Afterfall: InSanity were mixed The game holds a 50/100 score on aggregating website Metacritic and an average score of 48% on GameRankings.

GameSpot praised the game for its environment details, storyline, puzzles and quick-time events, but criticized the game for its boring melee combat, introduction and stilted voice acting. IGN called the game "boring". The review praised the game for its graphics but criticized its gameplay and sound.

The extended edition of the game was awarded a score of 3/10 by Destructoid.

== Sequel ==
On 19 October 2012, Nicolas Entertainment Group revealed that a sequel of the game would be developed through the creation of a Facebook page "Pearl of the Wasteland". On May 9, 2013, that Facebook page was replaced with another called Afterfall: Reconquest, due to the developer's choice of changing the name. Afterfall: Reconquest was to be set 63 years after the events of World War III. The previous page regularly posted the fictional chronicles of the survivors of the wasteland in the Afterfall universe. The game was to be episodic. The first episode was released on 19 February 2015.

== Licensing issues and Steam takedown ==
The game was taken down from Steam by June 2015 after a legal battle with Epic Games, whose engine was used to create it (Unreal Engine 3), Epic Games had filed a lawsuit in October 2012 over overdue royalties for using their game engine. A month later, the developers were ordered by the court to cease production and distribution of a video game as well as hand out all the data carriers with the game engine. After the developers failed to comply, Epic Games contacted Valve which blocked the video games made by it from being sold on Steam by May 2015. Nicolas Games filed for bankruptcy shortly after.
