= Achtung! Cthulhu Tactics =

2018 turn-based tactics game

- Developer: Auroch Digital
- Publisher: Ripstone Games
- Engine: Unity
- Platforms: Windows; PlayStation 4; Xbox One; Nintendo Switch
- Release: October 4, 2018: Windows; NA: October 4, 2018; EU: October 4, 2018; PlayStation 4; NA: November 20, 2018; EU: November 21, 2018; Xbox One; NA: November 23, 2018; EU: November 23, 2018; Switch; NA: January 24, 2019; EU: January 24, 2019
- Genre: Turn-based tactics
- Mode: Single-player

Achtung! Cthulhu Tactics is a turn-based tactics video game developed by Auroch Digital and published by Ripstone Games. It is an adaptation of Modiphius Entertainment's Achtung! Cthulhu tabletop game.

== Gameplay ==
In 1944, Nazi occultists harness the power of Cthulhu Mythos creatures. Players control a squad of four commandos who have prior experience dealing with the occult and are sent into Germany to counter the occult threat. Combat is turn-based and tactical, using action points. Another statistic, momentum points, governs how often characters can use special abilities, such as increasing visibility or doing extra damage. Instead of recharging automatically, regaining momentum points depends on actions, such as getting critical hits. As they win combats, players can customize the commandos using skill trees.

== Development ==
Auroch Digital crowdfunded the game on Kickstarter in March 2018 and raised a bit more than double the £10,000 goal. Ripstone Games and Modiphius Entertainment published the game for Windows on October 4, 2018; for PlayStation 4 on November 20–21, 2018; for Xbox One on November 23, 2018; and for Nintendo Switch on January 24, 2019.

== Reception ==
On Metacritic, Achtung! Cthulhu Tactics received mixed reviews on all platforms. Although initially enthused about the idea of tactical battles against Cthulhu Mythos creatures, RPGamer wrote that it "fails to deliver on the promise of either", citing what they felt were grindy battles and underusage of the occult elements, a view that was echoed by Jeuxvideo.com. Nintendo Life said that it "doesn't quite capture the intensity of the tabletop game" but recommended it to gamers who are looking for a different take on tactical games. Digitally Downloaded enjoyed both the PlayStation 4 and Switch ports, but recommended the Switch port overall because the gameplay "better suits the pick-up-and-play handheld experience". Describing it as more streamlined than XCOM, Bloody Disgusting said it is "a nice introduction to [Achtung! Cthulhu] for the uninitiated".
