= List of PC games (W) =

Section W of the PC games list

The following page is an alphabetical section from the list of PC games.

== W ==
Name	Developer	Publisher	Genre(s)	Operating system(s)	Date released
War of the Lance	Strategic Simulations, Inc.	Strategic Simulations, Inc.	Strategy	MS-DOS, Apple II, Commodore 64	1 May 1988
War of the Roses	Paradox Interactive	Fatshark	Action role-playing	Microsoft Windows	2 October 2012
Warcraft: Orcs & Humans	Blizzard Entertainment	Blizzard Entertainment	RTS	MS-DOS, macOS	23 November 1994
Warcraft III: Reign of Chaos	Blizzard Entertainment	Blizzard Entertainment	RTS	Microsoft Windows, macOS	3 July 2002
Wargame: AirLand Battle	Eugen Systems	Focus Home Interactive	Real-time tactics	Microsoft Windows, Linux, macOS	29 May 2013
Wargame: European Escalation	Eugen Systems	Focus Home Interactive	Real-time tactics	Microsoft Windows, Linux, macOS	22 February 2012
Wargame: Red Dragon	Eugen Systems	Focus Home Interactive	Real-time tactics	Microsoft Windows, Linux, macOS	17 April 2014
Warhammer: Arcane Magic	Turbo Tape Games	Turbo Tape Games	Turn-based tactics	Microsoft Windows	2015
Warhammer: Battle March	Black Hole Entertainment	NA: Namco Bandai Games; PAL: Deep Silver	Real-time tactics	Microsoft Windows	2 September 2008
Warhammer: Dark Omen	Mindscape; Games Workshop	Electronic Arts	Real-time tactics	Microsoft	23 May 1998
Warhammer: End Times – Vermintide	Fatshark	Fatshark	First-person shooter; Cooperative survival	Microsoft Windows	23 October 2015
Warhammer: Mark of Chaos	Black Hole Entertainment	NA: Namco Bandai Games; PAL: Deep Silver	Real-time tactics	Microsoft Windows	14 November 2006
Warhammer: Shadow of the Horned Rat	Mindscape	Mindscape	Real-time tactics	Microsoft Windows	11 November 1995
Warhammer 40,000: Dawn of War II	Relic Entertainment	THQ	Real-time tactics	Microsoft Windows	19 February 2009
Warhammer Online: Age of Reckoning	Mythic Entertainment	Electronic Arts	Real-time tactics	Microsoft Windows, Mac OS X	18 September 2008
Warhammer Quest	Rodeo Games	Chilled Mouse	Tactical role-playing	Microsoft Windows, macOS, Linux	7 January 2015
Warhammer: Vermintide 2	Fatshark	Fatshark	Action	Microsoft Windows	8 March 2018
WARNO	Eugen Systems	Eugen Systems	Real-time tactics	Microsoft Windows	20 January 2022
Wasteland	Interplay Productions	Electronic Arts	RPG	Commodore 64, Apple II, DOS, Microsoft Windows, Linux, macOS	1988
Wasteland 2	inXile Entertainment	Deep Silver	RPG	Microsoft Windows, OS X, Linux	19 September 2014
WCW Nitro	Inland Productions	THQ	Sports	Microsoft Windows	30 November 1998
Wheels of Aurelia	Santa Ragione S.r.l.	Santa Ragione S.r.l.	Visual Novel	Linux, Macintosh	20 September 2016
White Night	OSome Studio	Activision	Survival horror, noir, horror-noir	Microsoft Windows	3 March 2015
Widelands	Widelands Development Team	Widelands Development Team	Widelands	Linux, Macintosh, Windows	2 May 2019
WildStar	Carbine Studios	NC Soft	MMORPG	Microsoft Windows	7 June 2014
The Witcher	CD Projekt Red	Atari	Action role-playing	Microsoft Windows, macOS	26 October 2007
The Witcher 3: Wild Hunt	CD Projekt Red	Atari	Action role-playing	Microsoft Windows, macOS	19 May 2015
Wizards & Warriors	Heuristic Park	Activision	RPG	Microsoft Windows	27 September 2000
World in Conflict	Massive Entertainment	Sierra Entertainment (former), Ubisoft	Real-time tactics	Microsoft Windows	18 September 2007
World in Conflict: Soviet Assault	Massive Entertainment	Sierra Entertainment (former), Ubisoft	Real-time tactics	Microsoft Windows	10 March 2009
World of Final Fantasy	Square Enix	Square Enix	Role-playing	Microsoft Windows,	21 November 2017
World of Goo	2D Boy	2D Boy	Puzzle	Microsoft Windows, Linux, macOS	13 October 2008
World of Tanks	Wargaming	Wargaming	Action, MMO	Microsoft Windows	12 April 2011
World of Warplanes	Wargaming	Wargaming	Action, MMO	Microsoft Windows	13 November 2013
World of Warcraft	Blizzard Entertainment	Blizzard Entertainment	Online role-playing game	Microsoft Windows, macOS	23 November 2004
World of Warcraft: Battle for Azeroth	Blizzard Entertainment	Blizzard Entertainment	Online role-playing game	Microsoft Windows, macOS	14 August 2018
World of Warcraft: The Burning Crusade	Blizzard Entertainment	Blizzard Entertainment	Online role-playing game	Microsoft Windows, macOS	15 January 2007
World of Warcraft: Cataclysm	Blizzard Entertainment	Blizzard Entertainment	Online role-playing game	Microsoft Windows, macOS	7 December 2010
World of Warcraft: Legion	Blizzard Entertainment	Blizzard Entertainment	Online role-playing game	Microsoft Windows, macOS	30 August 2016
World of Warcraft: Mists of Pandaria	Blizzard Entertainment	Blizzard Entertainment	Online role-playing game	Microsoft Windows, macOS	25 July 2012
World of Warcraft: Warlords of Draenor	Blizzard Entertainment	Blizzard Entertainment	Online role-playing game	Microsoft Windows, macOS	13 November 2014
World of Warcraft: Wrath of the Lich King	Blizzard Entertainment	Blizzard Entertainment	Online role-playing game	Microsoft Windows, macOS	13 November 2008
WWE 2K15	Yuke's	2K	Sports	Microsoft Windows	28 April 2015
WWE 2K16	Yuke's	2K	Sports	Microsoft Windows	11 March 2016
WWE 2K17	Yuke's	2K	Sports	Microsoft Windows	17 February 2017
WWE 2K18	Yuke's	2K	Sports	Microsoft Windows	17 Oct 2017
WWE 2K19	Yuke's	2K	Sports	Microsoft Windows	9 October 2018
WWE 2K20	Visual Concepts	2K	Sports	Microsoft Windows	22 October 2019
WWE 2K22	Visual Concepts	2K	Sports	Microsoft Windows	11 March 2022
WWE 2K23	Visual Concepts	2K	Sports	Microsoft Windows	8 March 2023
WWE 2K24	Visual Concepts	2K	Sports	Microsoft Windows	8 March 2024
WWE 2K25	Visual Concepts	2K	Sports	Microsoft Windows	14 March 2025
