= War game (disambiguation) =

A war game is a type of strategy game that simulates warfare realistically.

War game, Wargame or War Games may also refer to:

== Conflict simulations ==
- Military exercise, a training operation
- Military simulation, a live or computer exercise to develop military strategies
- Wargame (video games), a genre that emphasizes strategic or tactical warfare on a map
- Board wargame, a genre that emphasizes strategic or tactical warfare on a map
- Wargame (hacking), a challenge involving exploiting or defending a computer system vulnerability

== Film and television ==
- The War Game, a film by Mai Zetterling
- The War Game, a 1965 BBC television film
- The War Games, a 1969 Doctor Who serial
- WarGames, a 1983 film by John Badham starring Matthew Broderick
  - #WarGames, a 2018 interactive film adaptation
  - WarGames: The Dead Code
- War Game (2002 film), an animated short film based on the 1993 children's novel
- War Game (2024 film), a documentary film
- War Games: At the End of the Day, a 2010 film by Cosimo Alemà
- "War Games" (Foyle's War), an episode of Foyle's War
- "War Games" (Space: 1999), an episode of Space: 1999
- The Wargame, a 2026 TV series

== Literature ==
- "War Game" (short story), a 1959 short story by Philip K. Dick
- War Game (novel), a 1993 children's novel about World War I
- War Games (novel), a 1981 novel by Karl Hansen
- Batman: War Games, a comic book story arc
- War Games, a 1966 novel by James Park Sloan
- War Games, a 1981 British title of the 1980 novel Optiman by Brian Stableford

== Music ==
- War Games (Grave Digger album) (1986)
- War Games (Rob Swift album) (2005)
- "War Games", a song by Crosby, Stills & Nash from the album Allies
- Ratne igre ("War Games"), a 1985 Yugoslav rock album and song by Kerber
- War Games (John Paul Young song)
- "War Games", a song by the Monkees from the album Missing Links

== Professional wrestling ==
- WarGames match, a professional wrestling match
- NXT WarGames, a professional wrestling event series

== Video games ==
- Wargamer (website), a video game website
- Wargaming (company), a videogame developer and publisher
- WarGames (video game), a 1984 video game for Colecovision
- WarGames: Defcon 1, a 1998 video game for PC and PlayStation
- Wargame: European Escalation, a 2012 real-time strategy game
- Wargame: AirLand Battle, a 2013 real-time strategy game
- Wargame: Red Dragon, a 2014 real-time strategy game
- War Games, a mode in Halo 4 and Halo 5: Guardians

== See also ==
- Business war games, a role-playing exercise set in the world of commerce
- Digimon Adventure: Our War Game!, a 2000 animated film
- A Game of War, a 1987 book about wargaming
- Game of War: Fire Age, a 2013 MMO freemium video game
- Game Wars a 1991 book about fish and game conflicts
- War (card game), a simple card game featuring a series of "battles" between two players
- War (disambiguation) § Games
- Wargaming (disambiguation)
