= Ground control =

Ground control may refer to:

== Aviation and spaceflight ==
- Air traffic control, in charge of the controlled areas on an airport
- Mission control center, responsible for spaceflight
- UAV ground control station

== Entertainment ==
- 187 Lockdown, a 1990s British electronic duo that released under the name Ground Control
- Ground Control (video game), a 2000 computer game by Massive Entertainment
  - Ground Control: Dark Conspiracy, 2000 expansion pack for Ground Control
- Ground Control II: Operation Exodus, a 2004 video game
- Ground Control (film), a 1998 film starring Kiefer Sutherland
- Ground Control (album), a 2021 album by English band Rudimental

== Other uses ==
- The application of rock mechanics to tunneling and underground mining operations
