= MW-1 =

German submunition delivery system

MW-1 in action

The MW-1 (Mehrzweckwaffe 1, multipurpose weapon) is a German munitions dispenser similar to the British JP233. It is designed to be carried on the Tornado IDS, although it can be carried on the Lockheed F-104 Starfighter and the McDonnell Douglas F-4 Phantom II. The MW-1 started to be phased out after the German Government ratified the Convention on Cluster Munitions in 2009.

== Submunitions ==
The MW-1 was designed so that different types of submunitions may be loaded into its 112 tubes. The MIFF, MUSA and MUSPA mines are parachute dropped, and upon reaching the ground self-right and arm. The mines are blast-resistant and are reported to self-destruct within less than forty days from deployment.

=== KB 44 ===
(Kleinbombe 44): Bomblets for use against unarmored and light armored targets such as vehicles and airplanes, etc.

=== STABO ===
(Startbahnbombe): Bomb to destroy runways. The first shaped charge explodes on impact, creating a channel under the surface. An additional charge creates an explosion under the concrete runway to make a crater with heaved sides (large jagged, uprooted edges), making it much more difficult to repair than a simple crater because the large jagged pieces have to be broken off, removed, and edges smoothed before a temporary or permanent repair can be effected.

=== MIFF ===
(Mine-Flach-Flach): Anti-tank mine with a magnetic field sensor. The MIFF mine is an anti-tank mine. The mine has a seismic sensor, as well as a magnetic influence sensor that it uses to determine the optimum detonation point. It uses two back-to-back Misznay-Schardin effect shaped charges to penetrate the hulls of armoured vehicles, and 38 secondary bowl shapes that produce secondary fragments.

==== Specifications ====
- Height: 98 mm
- Diameter: 132 mm
- Weight: 3.4 kg

=== MUSA and MUSPA ===
- MUSA (Multi-Splitter-Aktiv): Mine with active sensors and fragmentation charge for immediate or timed detonation.
- MUSPA (Multi-Splitter-Passiv-Aktiv): Mine with active and passive sensors with fragmentation warhead (2,100 metal splinters) for immediate or time-controlled detonation to destroy or damage aircraft and vehicles traversing the target area.

The MUSA and MUSPA mines are identical in external appearance but have different fuses that allow them to perform different functions. When triggered, the mine scatters 2,100 steel pellets to an effective radius of 100 meters.

The MUSA mine has a simple delay fuse which triggers the mine after a pre-set interval to prevent clearance operations.

The MUSPA mine, officially classified as an anti-aircraft mine, has an acoustic sensor which triggers the mine when the right acoustic signature is detected.

==== Specifications ====
- Height: 126 mm
- Diameter: 132 mm
- Weight: 4.5 kg

== In popular culture ==
- The combat flight simulator Ace Combat 04: Shattered Skies featured the MW-1 on the Tornado IDS and the game's fictional fighter aircraft, the X-02 Wyvern. Subsequent games would instead use the JP233 due to using the British designation.
- The MW-1 was featured as the Carpet Bombing Tactical Aid for the NATO faction in the real-time strategy game World In Conflict.
- The MW-1 is featured in the strategy video game Warno by Eugen Systems.

== See also ==
- JP233
- KMGU
- K/YBS500
- TL500
