= AOW =

AOW may refer to:

- Act of War: Direct Action, a real-time strategy video game
- Act of War: High Treason, an expansion pack for Act of War: Direct Action
- Advanced Open Water, a scuba diving training level common to many certification agencies
- Algemene Ouderdomswet, a Dutch pension act
- Age of Wonders, a turn-based strategy PC game
- Any Other Weapon, a weapons classification in the United States National Firearms Act
- Age of Wulin, a free-to-play Wuxia MMORPG published by Gala Networks Europe
- Art of Wrestling, a pro wrestling radio show by Colt Cabana
- Autostradowa Obwodnica Wrocławia, Wrocław motorway bypass in Poland
