= Times of Conflict =

2000 video game

- Developer(s): Eugen Systems
- Publisher(s): Microids
- Platform(s): Windows
- Release: FR: December 5, 2000; UK: December 2000
- Genre(s): Real-time strategy
- Mode(s): Single-player

Times of Conflict is a 2000 video game developed by Eugen Systems and published by Microids. The game is a real-time strategy title in which players control one of three civilizations on the alien planet of Edhaer: the Order of the Guild, the Foundation, and the Alliance, in three-way battles for control of the planet. Upon release, Times of Conflict received mixed reviews, with some praising the design of its campaign mode and battles. However, other critics felt the game was not distinguishable from other strategy games of the era, and critiqued its camera, controls and unit AI.

== Gameplay ==
Gameplay in the campaign mode of Times of Conflict is connected by actions on a strategic map.

The game has a Campaign mode, which progresses a series of missions, and a single battle mode for quick play. In Campaign, players select one of the leaders of the three factions. Gameplay takes place across map and battle phases. On the two-dimensional campaign map, the player's armies are represented as a pawn on areas marking the territories of Edhaer. Over moons, or phases of turn-based gameplay, the player can move their pawn across territories, attack enemies, or resupply. When opposing units are in the same territory, the game enters a battle phase, representing real-time gameplay. When players win battles in the real-time gameplay, they gain prestige points to purchase additional units, as well as control the claimed territory to create new units. Characters provide dialogue in this mode to progress the narrative of the campaign and advise the player.

Real-time gameplay is three-dimensional, and players can freely rotate and zoom the camera. Battles are fought using a range of units, including infantry, ranged shooters, light and heavy armored tanks, and aerial units. Players control units by clicking and commanding units, or issuing "macro-orders" that automate activities such as reinforcing or transporting units, or taking formation. The game features a "balanced order system", which assigns a priority level to player actions depending on how many clicks of the mouse a player has made. Times of Conflict also features a multiplayer mode supporting eight players.

== Reception ==
Reception

Review scores
Publication	Score
Gamekult	2/10
Génération 4	8/20
Jeuxvideo.com	16/20
PC Zone	12%
Giochi per il mio computer	6/10
PC Mania	4/6
Xtreme PC	61%

Jeuxvideo praised the game, remarking that its "fun and complex" design arose from the "character and personality" of its narrative and protagonists, the "extremely diverse" maps and missions. Génération 4 praised the game's "futuristic comic book atmosphere" and considered the game to have "good ideas", but felt the game's battles were "illegible" and lacked strategy. Giochi per il mio computer stated that the game "is not free from flaws" and lacked innovation, but "nonetheless, on a tactical and strategic level", the game maintained interest due to a "well-crafted and almost original single-player game mode". Xtreme PC praised the "spectacular" combat due to its lighting effects, but found the game's story, characters, and unit design lacked originality. Gamekult critiqued the game as "mediocre and appalling" due to its "non-existent" enemy AI and pathfinding, and the large amount of bugs, including "crashes and display errors". Martin Korda of PC Zone similarly criticised the game's unit behaviour, stating they "do exactly the reverse of what you tell them", and mocked the game's narrative and graphics.
