= The Gladiators: Galactic Circus Games =

2002 video game

- European cover art
- Developer: Eugen Systems
- Publishers: Arxel Tribe; Tri Synergy
- Platform: Windows
- Release: FR: October 20, 2002; EU: November 29, 2002; NA: March 06, 2003
- Genre: Real-time strategy

The Gladiators: Galactic Circus Games is a 2002 real-time strategy video game.

== Plot ==
Major Greg D. Callahan of the United States Marine Corps gets shot through a black hole and ends up in an alien world where he must fight in gladiator-style fights in an arena, and help a character named Princess Lydia.

== Gameplay ==
Players play through three strategy campaigns without the complication of resource-gathering and city-building. The arena announcer gives the player goals which they must complete to succeed.

== Critical reception ==
Gamezone said the game would appeal to lovers of the Heavy Metal comic. IGN praised the game for offering mind-numbing fast-paced enjoyment. Andy Eddy of GameSpy said the game had a promising concept that fell apart in its execution. Bob Colayco of GameSpot wrote that the gaming experience was soured by issues regarding its difficulty, interface bugs, and save-game problems.
