= Steel Division: Normandy 44 =

2017 video game

- Developer: Eugen Systems
- Publisher: Paradox Interactive
- Composer: Andreas Waldetoft
- Engine: IrisZoom
- Platform: Microsoft Windows
- Release: May 23, 2017
- Genre: Real-time strategy
- Mode: Multiplayer; single-player

Steel Division: Normandy 44 is a real-time strategy video game developed by Eugen Systems and published by Paradox Interactive, set in World War II.

== Setting ==
The game takes place in Normandy, France during the Second World War. It depicts the battles fought between the Allies and Germany, as the Allies push out of their invasion beachheads following the Normandy landings. A wide variety of military forces are represented, including those of Canada, Germany, France, Poland, the United Kingdom, and the United States.

== Gameplay ==
Players take control of historical units, based on the divisions that fought during the fighting in Normandy, and then choose from a set of units before the start of a match. Once the game is underway, the player can call in units from the selected deck. The matches are sub-divided into three phases, with more powerful units only becoming available after a certain point in the game. Steel Division: Normandy 44 features three single player campaigns, and up to 10v10 online multiplayer battles.

== Campaign ==
Steel Division: Normandy 44 consists of three campaigns; one for the Americans, one for the Germans, and one for the British and Commonwealth forces across different points and areas of the Normandy Campaign.

Mission Boston (6 June-11 June)

For the American campaign, the player starts the commanding elements of the 82nd Airborne Division as they attempt to secure the causeways behind the American beachheads. By the end of the campaign, the player is controlling a combined American-Marquis force as they try to prevent elements of Panzer-Ersatz-Abteilung 100 from retreating from the area around the village of Baupte.

Atlantikwall (6 June-7 June)

In a 'What-if" scenario for the German campaign, the player takes control of German forces inland from Sword Beach. Instead of holding the German armored formations in reserve for the suspected real invasion elsewhere, Rommel rushes the Panzer divisions to the front, spearheaded by elements of the 21st Panzer Division. Over a series of four missions, the player works to blunt and then counterattack the British landings, attempting to drive them back into the sea.

Operation Epsom (26 June-10 July)

British campaign

== Sequel ==
A sequel was announced on July 25, 2018. Entitled Steel Division 2, the game is set during Operation Bagration.
