= Ground Control II: Operation Exodus =

2004 video game

- Developer: Massive Entertainment
- Publisher: Vivendi Universal Games (Note: Released under the Sierra Entertainment brand name.)
- Producers: Martin Walfisz; Carl Fransson
- Designer: Henrik Sebring
- Programmers: Niklas Hansson; Johannes Norneby
- Artists: Tobias Strömvall; Pär Green
- Composer: Ola Strandh
- Platform: Microsoft Windows
- Release: NA: June 23, 2004; EU: June 25, 2004; CHN: September 3, 2004; JP: February 25, 2005
- Genre: Real-time tactics
- Modes: Single-player, multiplayer

Ground Control II: Operation Exodus is a 2004 real-time tactics video game developed by Massive Entertainment. It is a sequel to Ground Control, the award-winning game of the same genre. Much like its predecessor, it features 3D graphics and a fully rotational camera system.

== Gameplay ==
Similar to the first Ground Control, Operation Exodus focuses on combat tactics rather than base construction or managing an economy, but unlike its real-time tactics predecessor, Ground Control II has a resource system called acquisition. Acquisition points are earned through the capturing of victory locations and destruction of enemy forces and allow the player to field units on the battlefield and use the support weapons that are unique to each faction. The game is also significantly faster paced than its predecessor and moves along at a pace similar to real-time strategy games such as Command & Conquer.

The game features a three-sided conflict, but only two of the factions, the Northern Star Alliance and the Viron Nomads, are actually playable. The Terran Empire is a non-playable faction featured only in the single-player campaign. The two playable sides feature a total of 33 units available. All of these units are deployed onto the battlefield through dropships, much like the deployment procedures of its predecessor. These units include infantry, tanks, infantry fighting vehicles, aircraft, artillery, and static emplacements. Unlike Ground Control, however, unit customization is unavailable; each individual unit features a fixed secondary function.

== Plot ==
=== Settings ===
The story of Ground Control II takes place in the same universe as the original game but starts 320 years later and has little in common with the original game. The human race has discovered faster-than-light travel and has colonized the galaxy. There are two groups of colonies in this universe, dubbed the Inner Sphere and Outer Sphere. A physical phenomenon causes communications between the two areas to be only possible through a network of Tachyon relay stations built at the border of the spheres. Intergalactic travel is also impossible due to an unexplained barrier between the galaxies.

After the battle of Krig-7b that took place in the original video game, Major Sarah Parker (the original game's protagonist) destroyed the Earth's early warning relay station, commandeered a battle cruiser called the CSS Astrid (seen in the original game), and escaped. Subsequently, a stellar war that lasted 70 years changed the political layout of the colonies. A colony called Draconis Empire subjugated the Inner Sphere and established the Empire of Terra. It destroyed the communication relays, severing communications with the Outer Sphere. The next two hundred years was the age of strife for the Outer Sphere, for they had to rediscover the precious knowledge to which they no longer had access. Eventually, the Outer Sphere colonies formed two interstellar states: The Northern Star Alliance (NSA) and the Intergalactic Trade Guild (ITG). After two hundred years, however, the Empire of Terra invaded the Outer Sphere and began taking over the NSA. In 40 years of battle that followed, the Empire took most of the NSA territory and finally invaded the Morningstar Prime, the capital of the NSA.

=== Story ===
The game begins with Captain Jacob Angelus becoming a field commander for the NSA. Despite Captain Angelus's "exceptional" battlefield performance, it is clear that the NSA cannot win this war, and it is only a matter of time before the Empire overwhelms them. An unknown spacecraft crashes on Morningstar Prime, which Captain Angelus secures. NSA scientists who study the craft reveal that Major Parker outfitted the CSS Astrid with an ancient device called a Singularity Drive that enables the ship to bypass the intergalactic barrier and travel to other galaxies. NSA plans to use the vessel to evacuate NSA citizens to another galaxy, where the Empire cannot follow. Angelus departs to find the spaceship, with imperial forces in pursuit. Eventually, CSS Astrid is recovered and brought back to Morningstar Prime.

On Morningstar Prime, Captain Angelus must deal with the treachery of an NSA general and the arrival of fresh Imperial reinforcements. In the tragic final battle, Captain Angelus and his allies help evacuate anyone they can to CSS Astrid and see to their safe departure. Despite all the efforts, the Imperials destroy an entire detachment of NSA forces as well as an NSA shuttle, presumably loaded with passengers. Captain Angelus does not make it to CSS Astrid and is stranded on Morningstar Prime.

== Development ==
The game was announced in February 2003 and was originally going to be published through Vivendi Universal's NDA Productions division.

== Reception ==
Reception

Aggregate score
Aggregator	Score
Metacritic	80/100

Review scores
Publication	Score
Computer Gaming World	4/5
Eurogamer	7/10
Game Informer	8.5/10
GamePro	4/5
GameRevolution	B+
GameSpot	8.5/10
GameSpy	4.5/5
GameZone	8.8/10
IGN	8.8/10
PC Gamer (US)	84%
The New York Times	(average)
The Times	5/5

Ground Control II: Operation Exodus received "generally favorable reviews" according to video game review aggregator Metacritic. GameSpot named it the best computer game of June 2004.

== See also ==
- Ground Control: Dark Conspiracy
- 2004 in video gaming
