= HB 876 mine =

HB 876
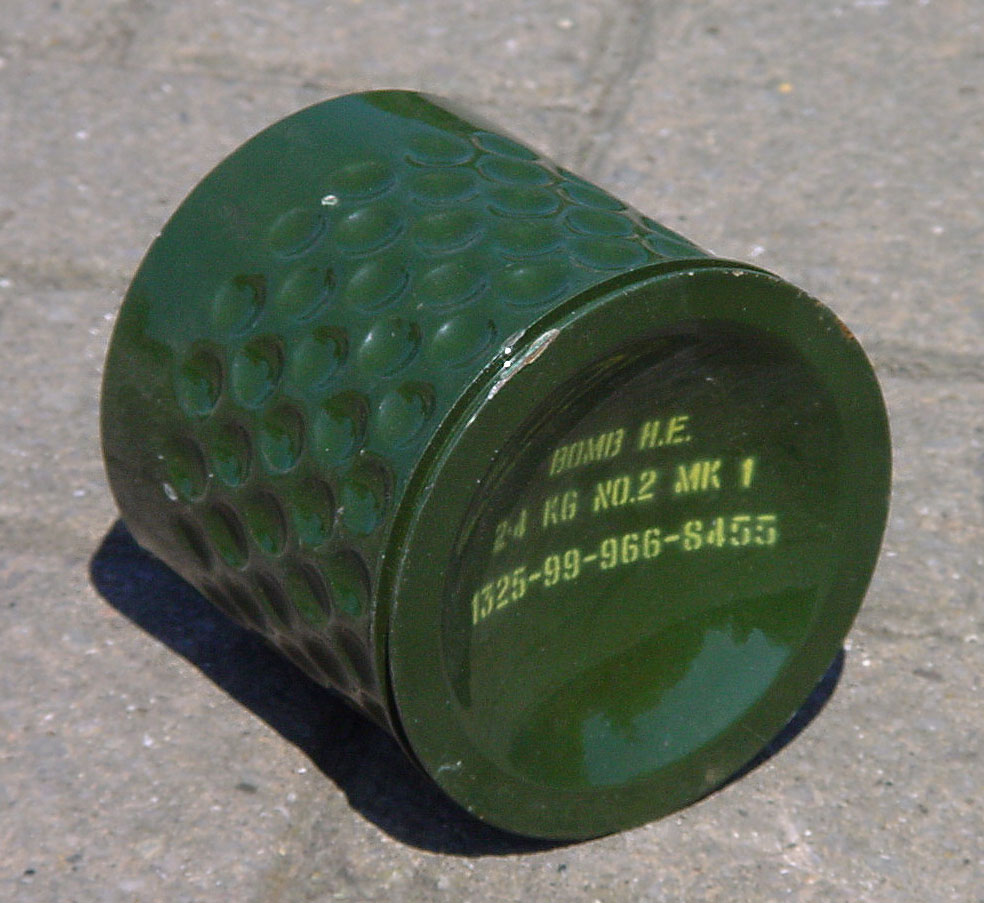
- HB 876 bomblet casing (Retardation and self-righting systems omitted)
- Type: Air-dropped frag mine
- Place of origin: United Kingdom

Production history
- Variants: see Variants

Specifications
- Mass: 2.4 kg
- Height: 150 mm
- Diameter: 100 mm
- Maximum firing range: 300 m
- Filling: Composition B
- Filling weight: 590 G

The HB 876 mine was an air dropped area denial weapon. It was used as part of the JP233 runway denial system and the 'Hades' variant of the BL755 cluster bomb. As a result of the anti-personnel mine ban it was withdrawn from British Royal Air Force service, and the last stockpiles of the mine were destroyed on 19 October 1999.

== Description ==
The mine is a cylinder consisting of three sections. The top section contains the warhead, consisting of an upward facing Misznay-Schardin effect warhead that creates an explosively formed penetrator capable of punching through heavy bulldozer blades. The dimpled sides of the cylinder have a shotgun effect, generating a pattern of metal fragments capable of penetrating steel plate beyond 20 metres and aluminium plate beyond 50 meters. The middle section of the mine contains the fuze, comprising a battery, safety and arming mechanism and electronic sensors. The bottom contains the parachute and a spring-loaded self-righting mechanism which opens like the petals of a sunflower after the device hits the ground.

After the mine is ejected from either the 'Hades' cluster bomb or JP233 dispenser a drogue parachute is deployed to slow the mine. The drogue parachute is quickly followed by the main parachute. After impact and a brief delay the mine self-rights and after another delay it arms itself.

The mine is then either triggered by a toppling movement or electronically self-destructs after a pre-set delay of a few minutes to more than 24 hours.

== Specifications ==
- Diameter: 100 mm
- Height: 150 mm
- Weight: 2.4 kg
- Explosive content: 590 g of Composition B

== Variants ==
- HB 876
- HB 876IF Influence sensor version of the mine

== See also ==
- Area denial weapons
- Anti-personnel mine
- Land mine
- Cluster bomb
