= Wargaming (disambiguation) =

Wargaming is a form of gaming that realistically represents warfare.

Wargaming may also refer to:

- Military wargaming
- Wargaming (company), a Belarusian multinational game developer and publisher headquartered in Nicosia, Cyprus
  - Wargaming Chicago-Baltimore, an American game developer that operates in Chicago, Illinois and Hunt Valley, Maryland
  - Wargaming Seattle, a closed video game developer located in Redmond, Washington that was formerly known as Gas Powered Games

== See also ==
- War game (disambiguation)
