= KMGU =

Soviet submunition delivery system

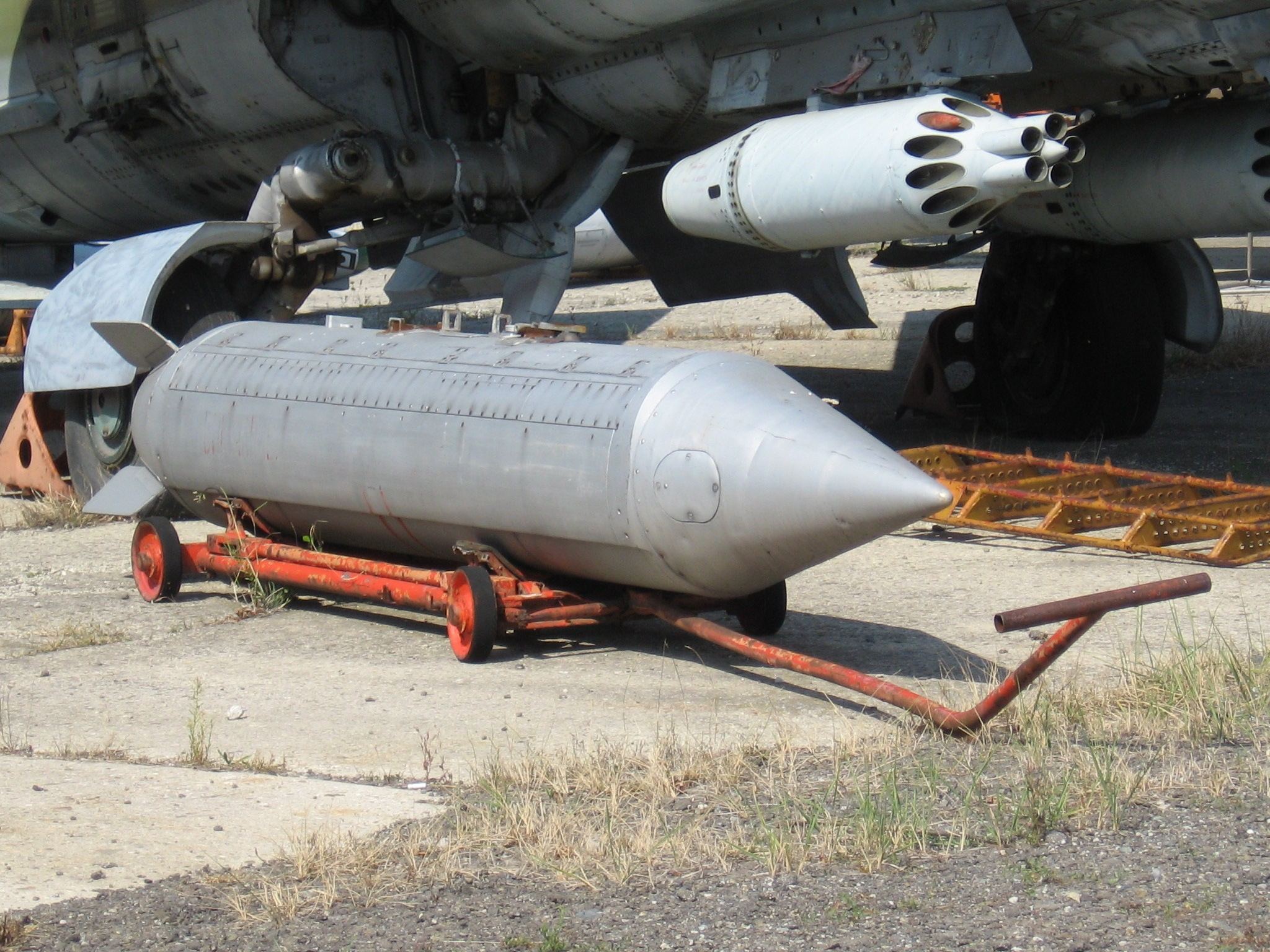
- KMGU container under a Czech Air Force MiG-23
- Type: Submunition delivery system
- Place of origin: Soviet Union

Service history
- Used by: Soviet Air Force
- Wars: Soviet–Afghan War

Specifications
- Filling: 96 (8×12) AO–2,5RT 2,5 kilogram-mass high explosive mines 96 (8×12) PTM–1 anti-tank mines 156 PFM–1S mines

KMGU (Russian: Контейнер малогабаритных грузов унифицированный, Unified Container for Small-sized Load) is a Soviet munitions dispenser similar to the British JP233 and the German MW-1. It can be carried by most Soviet and Russian attack aircraft, including the MiG-23, the MiG-27, the MiG-29, the Su-22, the Su-24, the Su-25, the Su-27, the Su-30, and the Su-34 and the Mi-24, Ka-50 and the Ka-52 attack helicopter. The cylindrical aluminum fuselage is divided into 8 sections, each has its own pneumatically opened doors. It can be filled with:

- 96 (8×12) AO-2,5RT 2.5 kilogram-mass high explosive mines
- 96 (8×12) PTM-1 anti-tank mines
- 156 PFM-1S mines

KMGU-2 is an advanced version of the system.

== Users ==
- Soviet Union
- Russian Federation

== See also ==
- JP233 – (United Kingdom)
- MW-1 – (Germany)
- K/YBS500 – (China)
- CS/BBC5 – (China)

== External sources ==
- КМГУ at the Sky Corner site
- KMG-U – janes.com
