= R.U.S.E. =

2010 video game

- Developer: Eugen Systems
- Publisher: Ubisoft (original release); Eugen Systems (re-release)
- Director: Alexis Le Dressay
- Designers: Stéphane Hernandez; Michael Mavros
- Programmer: Cédric Le Dressay
- Artist: Thierry Dunter
- Engine: IrisZoom
- Platforms: Microsoft Windows, Xbox 360, PlayStation 3, Mac OS X
- Release: NA: September 7, 2010; AU: September 9, 2010; EU: September 10, 2010, JP: October 21, 2010; November 15, 2011 (OS X)
- Genre: Real-time strategy
- Modes: Single-player, multiplayer

R.U.S.E. is a real-time strategy video game developed by Eugen Systems and published by Ubisoft which was released for Microsoft Windows, PlayStation 3, and Xbox 360, in September 2010. The game was subsequently released for macOS through Steam on November 15, 2011. R.U.S.E. is a strategic war game set during World War II and focuses on the invasion of Nazi Germany during late 1944. The campaign includes many historical and some fictional events. It focuses on information warfare instead of a brute-force approach. Players can use a series of ruses and decoys to trick their enemies and change the outcome of the battles. However, the outcome of the battles in the game also relies quite heavily on how a player manages their economy and which units they use. In December 2015, Ubisoft pulled the game from Steam due to the expiration of the military license. In 2018, the Xbox 360 version was released on Xbox One via backwards compatible release. On May 5, 2026, R.U.S.E. was re-released on Steam with all of the previously separately sold DLCs as well as most Ubisoft Rewards now being included in the base game for everyone.

== Gameplay ==
Gameplay screenshot

=== Units ===
Units in R.U.S.E are commanded using the mouse and can defend themselves against enemies provided they have the right weapon to counter them and within the range of fire. When units are ordered to attack, a crosshair indicates their rate of success in eliminating the target. It can either be: very easy, easy, balanced, danger or high danger. The latter meant that the target is highly dangerous and the unit(s) may refuse to engage when ordered to do so. Critically injured units will pull back with a (!) on top of the unit. Units that are unable to engage contact will pull back automatically when threatened. Sometimes a unit may be unable to pull back because it is experiencing shock or stress. Damaged units recover themselves when not engaged. Some units in R.U.S.E can be upgraded to enhance their defence and weapon. Some units require an upgrade cost to allow production.

==== Aircraft ====
The player who controls the sky can control the battle. Aircraft are fast and can travel all over the map without being affected by any type of terrain. They are produced from the airfield. Aircraft carry limited ammo and must land in order to reload before they can strike again. Aircraft include reconnaissance, fighters, fighter-bombers and bombers. Paratroopers are infantry that can be deployed by air. Paratroopers have no defense ability during flight. Some air-reconnaissance can defend themselves with a light machine gun, but will not be able to fight off most aircraft that attack it.

==== Buildings ====
There are two primary types of buildings in R.U.S.E.: defense structures and production buildings. Defense structures can be used to defend against enemy units. Each faction has a set of unique structures which can defend against certain types of units. These buildings cannot be captured. Production buildings produce units or supplies, and consist of the Headquarters, Secondary Headquarters, Administrative Building, Supply Depot, Barracks, Armor Base, Artillery & Anti-Air Base, Anti-Tank Base, Prototype Base, and Airfield. These building produce units and upgrades for those units based on what faction you are playing as. Units will vary on cost, armor, and firepower based on the faction that you choose.

=== Factions ===
In the campaign the United States is the only playable faction (although units from other factions are placed under the player's control in several missions), but other factions are present in the game and can be played on- and offline in battle mode. The factions include the United Kingdom, United States, Nazi Germany, Kingdom of Italy, Free French Forces, the Soviet Union, and Japan. Each possesses a unique balance of strengths and weaknesses, which allows for more dynamic gameplay.

For example, the United States relies on fast units and air power. Germany relies on powerful, heavy tanks (such as the Tiger and King Tiger). The Japanese faction is quite different from most other nations. For example, it is the only nation to not have concealable anti-air guns. Its tanks are comparable to the Italian line, where a 'medium' tank (Ha-Go) is a light tank to all other factions. It has advanced artillery, but, unlike all other nations (US, Germany, USSR), the HA-TO does not have the 2.4 km range and fires like an assault gun (one 300 mm 170 kg shell at a time). Besides nuclear weaponry, it is the most powerful artillery gun in the game, with two shots generally being enough to destroy most buildings.

The Soviet Union utilises variety and quick production with infantry as opposed to most nations. France has powerful and resistant bunkers, such as the "Maginot" bunker, named for the defensive line on Alsace-Lorraine pre-World War 2. The United Kingdom features an efficient fighter lineup with the Hurricane, Spitfire, and even the Typhoon as an effective close air support capable of defending itself. The Kingdom of Italy features the largest array of light armour units such as the M13/40 tank "Carro M13" and the L3/35 "Carro Veloce".

=== Ruses ===
R.U.S.E. employs a system of ruses that allow the player to fool or bluff an opponent, and ruses that give the player's units an alteration. The ruses are divided into four different categories: those that reveal information (such as Decryption), those that hide information (such as Radio Silence), those that allow for fake structures/units, designed to trick the enemy (such as Decoy Offensive), and those that alter unit behavior (such as Blitz or Terror).

=== Multiplayer ===
R.U.S.E. features an online multiplayer component and allows for dedicated servers. It contains both cooperative and competitive multiplayer, and it provides for ranked matches.

On September 22, 2010, Ubisoft announced that measures were being taken to reduce cheating in the game, with the introduction of the Valve Anti-Cheat system (VAC) in the next patch.

=== Operations ===
In addition to the main story mode, the player can take part in several "Operations". These are similar to story-mode missions which use specific conditions not present in the other non-story mode section "Battles", for example, limiting the number of aircraft, tanks, etc. a player can deploy. Some of the operations are historically inspired, whereas others are speculative, for example a 1948 border conflict between the US and USSR over Berlin.

== Plot ==
R.U.S.E. takes place during World War II. The game contains a single story arc, portrayed through the perspective of Joseph Sheridan of the United States Army. Sheridan, a Harvard dropout, joins the U.S. Army and eventually assumes control of the First Armored Division. The game opens in 1945 as General Sheridan liberates Colditz Castle to free an undercover operative, code named Nightingale, who knows the identity of an Axis informer, code-named Prometheus. Sheridan then reminisces to 1943 when he was a major during the Allied North African campaign, when leaked information led to devastating Allied losses at the Battle of Kasserine. Sheridan meets British intelligence officer Colonel Andrew Campbell, and working together, in spite of Sheridan's inept commanding officer General Weatherby, they are able to turn the tide of battle. Sheridan is promoted to lieutenant colonel for his efforts.

In 1943, Sheridan takes part in the Battle of Monte Cassino, and while he disobeys Weatherby's direct orders to confuse German intelligence, Sheridan is able to push the Germans back and open up the road to Rome. Sheridan is promoted to general and meets Kate Garner, an attaché from the American War Office. At a victory party, Campbell remarks that the Germans are not fully defeated yet and that Sheridan is turning into Weatherby now that he has been promoted.

In 1944, Sheridan is in command of US troops landing at Utah Beach on D-Day, with Weatherby in command of Omaha Beach. Sheridan is able to secure a beach head and defend it against counter-attacks despite Weatherby's inability to secure Sheridan's flank. The operation in Normandy is hampered by inaccurate information given to Campbell by the French resistance; this, along with remarks from Garner, strains Sheridan and Campbell's friendship.

Later that year, Sheridan is placed in command of forces in Operation Market Garden, and Weatherby is discreetly placed in command of forces "in reserve". After an exchange between Campbell and Garner, Campbell remarks that he cannot offer the same "incentives" as Garner and states that he will request a transfer. Despite Garner's insistence that Sheridan has "outgrown" Campbell, Sheridan is still clearly bothered by the British Officer's departure.

Despite deeply inaccurate information on Axis forces in the area, Sheridan is able to keep "The Highway to Hell" open. However the British forces at the final bridge to be secured are forced to surrender, thus ending Market Garden as a failure. Garner leaves for Washington D.C. for a new "promotion" leaving Sheridan feeling sorry for himself.

Three months later Sheridan and Campbell meet on the Belgian front, and the two make amends, with Sheridan apologizing and telling Campbell that "he was right and that they should have listened to Campbell". With Campbell's help Sheridan manages to hold onto the key city of Bastogne during the Battle of the Bulge despite Weatherby surrendering his forces. During the siege, General von Richter, a German general who gave Sheridan much trouble in the past, personally requests Sheridan surrender. He reveals that the Germans have received orders not to take prisoners of war any more, but despite this, offers to guarantee the safety of Sheridan and his men if they surrender honorably. Sheridan refuses, only demanding to know how an honorable man like von Richter could serve the Axis. After pushing back the German offensive Sheridan and Campbell interrogate General Von Richter upon capturing him. Learning that only the head of the German Intelligence Service, the Abwehr, Admiral Canaris, knew the identity of the spy Prometheus, but the Admiral had been arrested for plotting to kill Hitler.

Returning to the present, Sheridan, Campbell and the undercover agent, Angie, head for Torgau on the Elbe to supposedly meet up with the Soviets. However, the meeting turns into a race to reach the secret weapons research facility in Torgau before the Russians do. In order to avoid a "diplomatic incident", Sheridan receives help from an unlikely ally: General Von Richter, who also does not want the weapons to end up in Soviet hands. Under the cover of Von Richter's German troops, Sheridan and his men reach the weapons facility in the Soviet zone and destroy it. In the process Sheridan learns Prometheus is his former attaché Kate Garner. It is revealed that Garner had not only been giving intel to the Germans on the American forces but that she also had been giving intel to the Soviets on German weapon research. The weapons in question are long range V-2 rockets equipped with nuclear warheads. Despite having destroyed the research facility Sheridan learns that Garner had already moved several rockets to another location.

Sheridan and Campbell prepare to attack Garner's base and destroy the weapons, but are forced to re-think their strategy when Sheridan receives a warning from Garner that she will use the V-2 rockets if they continue to provoke her. Sheridan assures Garner that he won't back off, and Garner simply responds that Sheridan will be "rolled over by the modern world" as communism will be inevitably victorious. Good news arrives when the Soviet Government declares the 8th Guards Army (the branch of the Soviet military Garner was working with) is an extremist renegade faction and Allied Commander General Eisenhower orders a full-scale assault on Garner's base. With the help of some newly developed nuclear equipped artillery, Sheridan manages to destroy Garner's base, destroying the German nuclear warheads and killing Garner in an atomic blast. At the end, Sheridan expresses his wish to take a vacation and see Europe "without the bullets".

== Development ==
The game supports multitouch screens and PlayStation Move. It is powered by the IRISZOOM engine developed by Eugen Systems to enable the seamless zooming from aerial view to detailed maps. R.U.S.E. was originally going to use Ubisoft's permanent Internet connection DRM, but this was removed in favor of Steamworks. R.U.S.E. is AMD Eyefinity validated.

A free DLC called the Manhattan Project Pack was released in December 2010 adding two new modes. New maps and operations were added with the "Chimera Pack" in January 2011. A further DLC was released in February 2011 adding Japan as a faction, and three operations.

In December 2015, R.U.S.E. was pulled from Steam due to a military licensing issue which was revealed on March 31, 2016. According to Ubisoft, they stated the reason that "Due to the expiration of licensing rights over certain military items within the game, R.U.S.E. is no longer available for purchase". Players that have already bought the game aren't affected by this.

The Ubisoft servers for online features were turned off in January 2024.

In May 2026, Eugen Systems announced that they had recently re-acquired the rights to the game and would be releasing it on Steam again, effective immediately. The return included technical updates, as well as full Steam Deck compatibility. The re-release was published by Eugen Systems integrating all previously released DLC.

== Reception ==
Reception

Aggregate score
Aggregator	Score		
Aggregator	PC	PS3	Xbox 360
Metacritic	76/100	76/100	78/100

Review scores
Publication	Score		
Publication	PC	PS3	Xbox 360
Edge	N/A	N/A	8/10
Eurogamer	N/A	N/A	8/10
Famitsu	N/A	29/40	(X360) 30/40; 29/40
Game Informer	7.75/10	7.75/10	7.75/10
GamePro	3/5	N/A	N/A
GameRevolution	B+	N/A	N/A
GameSpot	7/10	7.5/10	7.5/10
GameTrailers	N/A	7.5/10	N/A
GameZone	N/A	5/10	5/10
IGN	8.5/10	8/10	8/10
Jeuxvideo.com	17/20	N/A	N/A
Joystiq	3/5	N/A	N/A
Official Xbox Magazine (US)	N/A	N/A	7/10
PC Gamer (UK)	84%	N/A	N/A
PlayStation: The Official Magazine	N/A	7/10	N/A
The A.V. Club	N/A	N/A	B−
Metro	N/A	7/10	N/A

R.U.S.E. received "generally favorable reviews" on all platforms according to the review aggregation website Metacritic. In Japan, where the PlayStation 3 and Xbox 360 versions were ported for release on October 21, 2010, Famitsu gave both console versions each a score of 29 out of 40, while Famitsu Xbox 360 gave the latter console version a score of one seven, one eight, one seven, and one eight for a total of 30 out of 40.
