= JP233 =

British submunition delivery system

- JP233 deployed from a Panavia Tornado
- Type: Submunition delivery system
- Place of origin: United Kingdom

Service history
- Used by: Royal Air Force; Royal Saudi Air Force
- Wars: Operation Desert Storm

Production history
- Manufacturer: Hunting Engineering

Specifications
- Filling: 30 SG-357 cratering bomblets; 215 HB-876 anti-personnel mines
- Filling weight: SG-357, 57 lb (26 kg); HB-876, 5.3 lb (2.4 kg)

The JP233, originally known as the Low-Altitude Airfield Attack System (LAAAS), is a British submunition delivery system. It consists of large dispenser pods carrying several hundred submunitions designed to attack runways.

== Design and development ==
Development of the system began in 1977 as a 50/50 cooperative programme between Hunting Engineering (now known as INSYS) of the UK and the US Air Force. The USAF intended to use the weapon with its General Dynamics FB-111 strike aircraft; however, in 1982 rising costs led them to pull out of the programme, and the British completed development on their own for potential use with the Panavia Tornado, SEPECAT Jaguar and Hawker Siddeley Harrier.

The dispensers could be carried on wing pylons: short-finned containers for bomblets, or medium-length finned containers for mines. The F-111 was capable of carrying a pair of each type, but the Jaguar and Harrier would be able to carry only a single pair of either type. The Tornado could be fitted with a pair of much larger pods on the shoulder pylons, each containing both types of munition. Each JP233 as fitted to the Tornado was divided into a rear section with 30 SG-357 runway cratering submunitions, while the front section carried 215 HB-876 anti-personnel mines. Both types of submunitions were retarded by small parachutes.

The SG-357, which weighed 26 kilogrammes (57 pounds), was a two-stage munition. The longer, smaller-diameter forward section consists of a cylindrical high-explosive charge with a hole down the centre. The shorter, larger-diameter rear section held a shaped charge. At the front of the munition was a telescopic stand-off fusing system that created the correct detonation distance for the shaped charge. On impact, the extended fuse initiated the shaped charge, creating a metal jet which travelled through the centre of the forward charge element and then penetrated the concrete runway surface to create an underground chamber. The momentum of the cylindrical charge was enough for it to follow down through the hole created by the shaped charge before exploding some distance under the runway surface. This second explosion was intended to produce a crater with significant "heave" at the edge, making repairs much more difficult and time-consuming.

The HB-876 mines would lie scattered on the surface, making rapid repair of the runway very hazardous. The outside of the munition was surrounded by a "coronet" of spring steel strips that were held flat against the sides of the mine. After landing on the surface, a small explosive device would fire and release the coronet springs such that the mine would become "erect" on the surface, with its self-forging fragment warhead pointing vertically upwards. The cylindrical case of the mine was made from dimpled steel and on detonation would spread small steel anti-personnel fragments, rather like a hand-grenade, in all radial directions. They would explode at preset intervals or if disturbed. Standing above the surface on the coronet of spring steel legs, they would tilt toward a bulldozer blade when pushed before detonating and firing the forged fragments toward the vehicle.

Unlike most other submunition delivery systems that essentially function as free-falling bombs, the JP233 dispenser pods remained with their aircraft during operation and were jettisoned once empty.

== Deployment ==
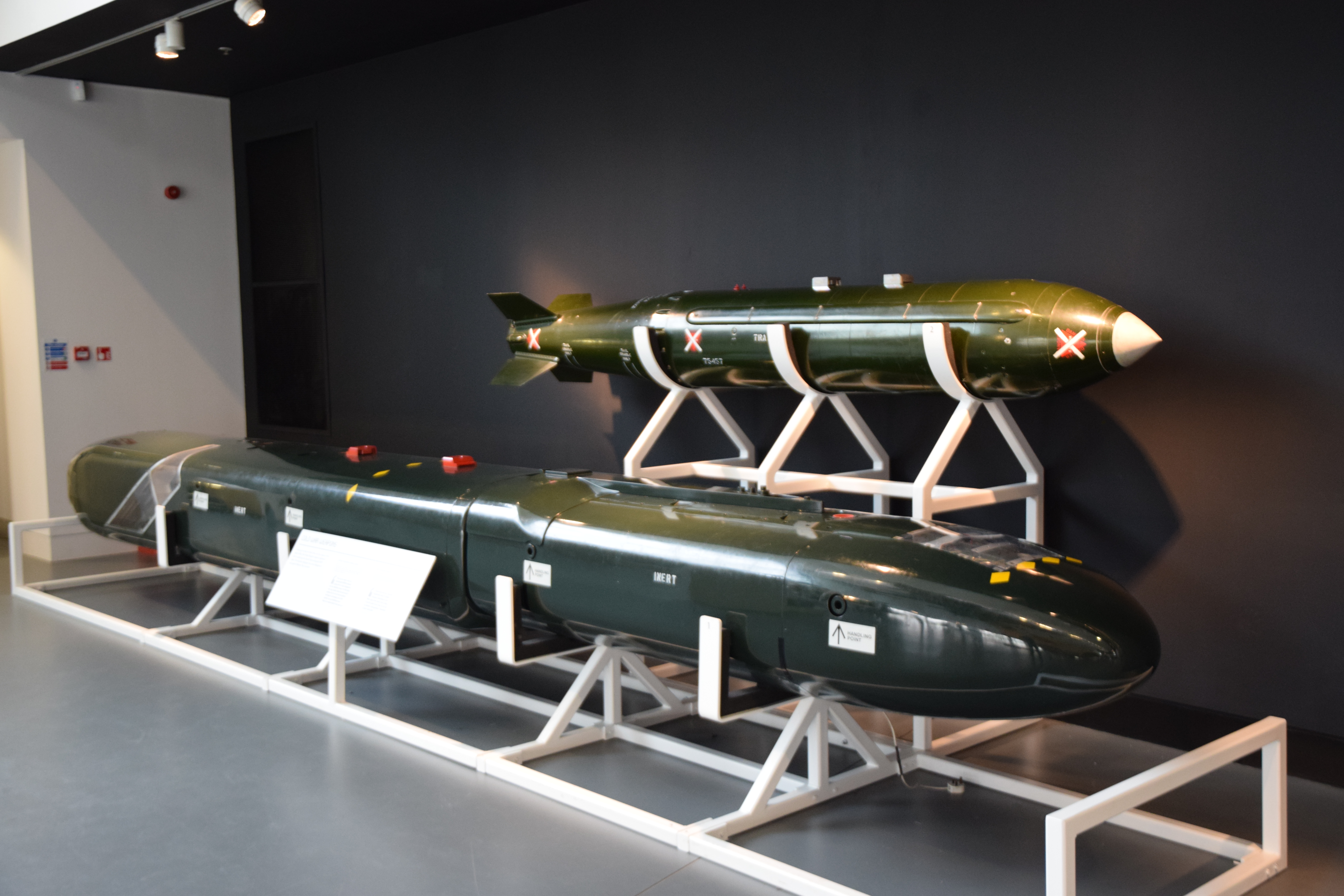
A JP233 (at bottom) on display at the Royal Air Force Museum in London

Deployment required the aircraft to fly low, straight and level over an enemy airfield, and when over the runway the pods would dispense their payload. During the Gulf War, it was widely reported in the popular press that Tornados were shot down by anti-aircraft artillery fire and MANPADS during delivery of the JP233 munition. In fact, none of the losses occurred during the attack phase of a JP233 mission. Only one aircraft was lost carrying the JP233, when Tornado ZA392 crashed into the ground approximately 16 km (10 mi) after delivering the weapon at low level; enemy fire was not reported and it was believed that this was an incident of controlled flight into terrain.

What alarmed the crews of British and Saudi Arabian Tornados using JP233 was that the aircraft was brightly illuminated at night by the exploding munitions. Attacks using JP233 were suspended six days into the Gulf War, as the Iraqi Air Force was effectively flying no missions.

With the increasing availability of standoff attack munitions capable of the same mission with little risk to the flight crew and aircraft, and the British entry into the Land Mines Treaty (which declares the HB-876 illegal), the UK withdrew the JP233 from service in 1998. JP233 would also have been rendered prohibited under the Convention on Cluster Munitions.

Examples of the JP233 are in various museums. The Imperial War Museum also has films, viewable online, of tests of the JP233 Airfield Attack System and Airfield Denial System. The Cold War Gallery of the National Museum of the US Air Force has a JP233 on display, fitted to a Panavia Tornado GR1 aircraft.

== See also ==
- BLU-107 Durandal – (France)
- Smart Anti-Airfield Weapon – (India)
- BAP 100 – (France)
- MW-1 – (Germany)
- KMGU – (Soviet Union)
- K/YBS500 – (China)
- TL500 – (China)
- Area denial weapons
- Ottawa Treaty
