= PTM-1 =

Soviet anti-tank mine

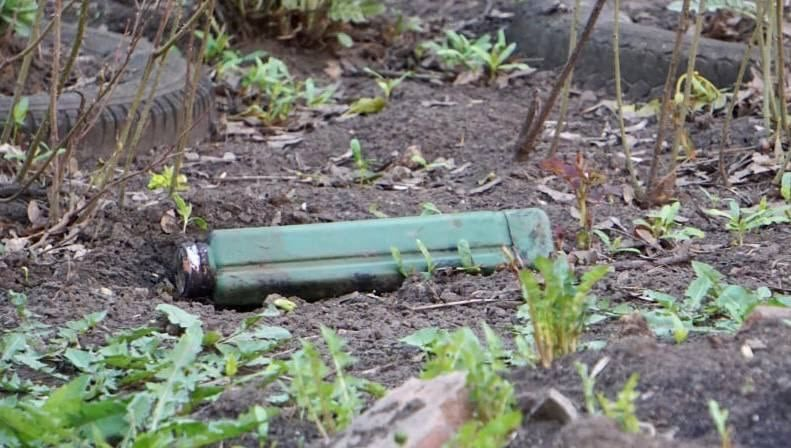
PTM-1

The PTM-1 (Russian: ПТМ-1), also known as the PTM-1G, PTM-1S, and the PGMDM is a Soviet/Russian plastic-bodied anti-vehicle landmine. It is generally deployed by aircraft via cluster munition dispenser such as the KMGU munitions dispenser, helicopter or rocket artillery via the BM-21 or BM-27 rocket systems.

== Description ==
The PTM-1 is a blast mine that can be pressure- or self-activated. It is 338 mm long and rectangular in shape. It contains approximately 1.5 kg of liquid explosive. A cylindrical housing at one end of the mine contains the self-destruct timer, settable to 2 hour increments for a maximum of 24 hours. Other sources give a range of 3-40 hours. The mine is activated by a single pressure or accumulation of light pressures anywhere on any part of the mine body. It has a 2.6 second firing delay.

== Operational use ==
As of 24 February 2023, the PTM-1 has been utilized during the ongoing Russian invasion of Ukraine. It is known to be stockpiled by both Russia and Ukraine. It has also been found in use in Afghanistan, Armenia, Azerbaijan, and Russia.
