= Steel Division 2 =

2019 video game

- Developer: Eugen Systems
- Publisher: Eugen Systems
- Director: Alexis Le Dressay
- Engine: IrisZoom
- Platform: Windows
- Release: June 20, 2019
- Genres: Real-time strategy, Turn-based strategy
- Modes: Single-player, multiplayer

Steel Division 2 is a real-time strategy video game developed and published by Eugen Systems. Released worldwide on 20 June 2019, Steel Division 2, set during Operation Bagration, is the sequel to the 2017 game Steel Division: Normandy 44.

== Gameplay ==
Set during Operation Bagration, Steel Division 2 is a real-time strategy video game that takes influence from World War II, similarly to its predecessor, Steel Division: Normandy 44. The game includes single-player, multiplayer, and cooperative aspects. The single-player is dubbed "Dynamic Strategic Campaigns" and is turn-based (unlike the previous game), with each turn being the equivalent of half a day, though combat is done in real-time. Multiplayer allows for up to twenty players in ten against ten battles. Battles feature twenty-five maps that are scaled 1:1 and the campaigns feature maps with a size of up to 150 × 100 kilometres. These maps cover details of battles that took place during the operation. Able to play as both the Allied powers and Axis powers, players have the option of eighteen divisions and more with DLC, with there being over six hundred units when building a deck. Decks are used during game, and only units in the deck can be deployed. Players who owned Steel Division: Normandy 44 have access to some 8 divisions (Both Axis and Allies) with over 350 units.

== Development ==
In early 2018, a strike of almost half of the developers at Eugen Systems took place, ceasing work until April. No news on the subject was released until the announcement for Steel Division 2. On July 25, 2018, the announcement for Steel Division 2 was made alongside a trailer. It was declared that Paradox Interactive would not be publishing the game, despite their involvement with Steel Division: Normandy 44. Steel Division 2 is now the first game by Eugen Systems to be independently published. Alexis Le Dressay, the game director and company co-founder, said they listened to fan feedback from Steel Division: Normandy 44, and made relevant improvements. An updated game engine, IrisZoom, redeveloped combat mechanics, and a new art style were noted as examples.

The game was finally released on June 20 2019.

== Reception ==
The game received "mixed or average" reviews according to review aggregator Metacritic. On the video game distribution website Steam it stands at "Mostly Positive" for reviews across the game's lifetime and "Very positive" for "recent reviews".
