= World in Conflict: Soviet Assault =

Video game expansion

- Developer: Massive Entertainment
- Publisher: Ubisoft
- Platform: Microsoft Windows
- Release: NA: March 10, 2009; EU: March 12, 2009; AU: March 17, 2009
- Genre: Real-time strategy
- Modes: Single player, Multiplayer

World in Conflict: Soviet Assault is a 2009 expansion pack developed by Massive Entertainment and Swordfish Studios for the 2007 real-time tactics video game World in Conflict. It features the ability to play as the Soviet Union in the single player campaign, against which the player fought in the original World in Conflict as well as adding additional multiplayer maps.

The game is set in an alternate 1989 in which the Politburo of the Soviet Union elects to take military action to sustain itself, rather than collapse. Failing to achieve aid diplomatically, the Soviet Union invades Western Europe and the Pacific Northwest region of the United States. However, in addition to the standard US campaign, the player also assumes the role of Romanov, a lieutenant in the Soviet Army under the command of Colonel Vladimir Orlovsky. Orlovsky also commands two other subordinates in his battalion; his nephew Captain Nikolai Malashenko and old friend Major Valeriy Lebedjev, a KGB officer attached to the battalion. The expansion adds a total of six Soviet missions interspersed between the original game's missions, thus completing the story and acting as an update for the campaign while retaining the original game's units and features.

The World in Conflict: Complete Edition and standalone Soviet Assault expansion pack were released in the United States on March 10, 2009, and later on in Europe and Australia on March 12, 2009.

World in Conflict: Soviet Assault offers multiplayer functionality, supporting up to 16 players online or over LAN. The official Massgate servers were shut down by Ubisoft in December 2015. However, in 2016, the player community restored online multiplayer functionality through an unaffiliated version of Massgate. Ubisoft revived multiplayer through published open-source Massgate in 2017.

== Gameplay ==
The new expansion features 6 new single player missions and 2 new multiplayer maps. It features new missions in the single player campaign and will integrate these new missions with the current US campaign, meaning the two will be interwoven with one another. The Console versions were to feature voice commands that would allow units to be ordered and deployed onto the battlefield through a headset. However this feature was never implemented for the PC version. The 2 multiplayer maps are available free of charge for owners of the original World in Conflict.

Soviet Assault brings a new Soviet campaign that is entwined with the original World in Conflict campaign, tying up the loose ends in the original campaign.

== Plot ==
In 1988, on the verge of total economic collapse, the Soviet Union demands immediate aid from the West; tensions begin to rise over the next year as negotiations drag on, and the Soviets threaten conflict should NATO refuse to comply with their demands. However, NATO believes the Soviet's threat of war is nothing but an elaborate ruse, and by the summer of 1989, negotiations break down entirely.

In East Berlin, Colonel Orlovsky prepares his battalion for the invasion of West Germany. A few hours before this, Lieutenant Romanov is tasked with leading a team of Spetsnaz commandos into West Berlin to rig explosives on several Surface-to-air missile batteries situated near the Berlin Wall. By early morning, the explosives are detonated, and the Soviet forces rush into West Germany, successfully pushing out the US defenders and starting World War III.

Four months later, in November, the Soviet Union launches a surprise invasion of the Northwestern United States, subsequently occupying Seattle, Washington and its surrounding areas. Colonel Orlovsky commands the Soviet expeditionary forces in America, his zealous nephew Captain Malashenko, and his close friend Major Lebedjev, a KGB attache. Romanov is also assigned to the American theatre, and his unit is tasked with pacifying the surrounding American countryside.

Though Malashenko adamantly believes the Soviet invasion was for the liberation of the American people, the Soviet forces constantly encounter resistance from fierce civilian militias and the National Guard. Malashenko eventually loses his patience with the American proletariat, even going as far as to suggest mass executions by firing squad to set an example to the Americans, which Orlovsky vehemently forbids. Despite this, Malashenko attempts to execute civilian collaborators but is caught moments before during a counter-insurgency operation near Eatonville; a furious Orlovsky threatens him with a court-martial if he disobeys orders again.

Months before the invasion of Seattle, following the initial Soviet invasion of West Germany, the war grinds into a stalemate in Europe, with either side gaining little to no ground. The Soviet forces are then deployed to Norway, where Orlovsky's battalion raid an early-warning radar base to allow the Soviet Air Force to fly bombing missions deep in France and the United Kingdom. The mission is a success, but news soon reaches Orlovsky that NATO troops have entered Soviet territory at Murmansk. Returning home, Orlovsky and his battalion are tasked with defending a POW camp from a NATO raid. Before the battle, Malashenko is informed that a NATO operation had killed his wife and infant child. He launches into a tirade about the lack of significant progress being made in the war and the constant lies the GRU and KGB feed to both the military and government, respectively.

In the wake of the disastrous outcome of Cascade Falls, where the US military had detonated a tactical nuclear device over the town to protect Fort Teller, Orlovsky leads his weary battalion back to Seattle, to prepare for the coming American counterattack. However, the Soviets pass through a heavily defended area, and the US forces use MLRS artillery to harass the retreating Soviets. Romanov is tasked with searching for and destroying the positions, but midway through, Orlovsky comes to terms with the conflict's futility and makes arrangements for the battalion to return home. A furious Malashenko shoots Orlovsky dead, then moves his company back to Seattle. At the same time, Major Lebedjev assumes command of the rest of the battalion and orders a retreat back to the Soviet Union, per Orlovsky's wish.

== Distribution ==
The expansion was delivered through two methods: online download and retail. There are two retail versions, with one consisting of the expansion only, with another, titled World in Conflict: Complete Edition, containing the original game and the Soviet Assault expansion. The online download only contains Soviet Assault and is designed for players who already have the original game.

All the multiplayer content released for Soviet Assault (new maps) is available free of charge to the World in Conflict community via Massgate. However the new single-player missions must be purchased for the user to access the content.

== Development ==
World in Conflict: Soviet Assault was originally to be released in Q4 2008 by Vivendi Games for the Xbox 360 and PlayStation 3 as a standalone game, and for Windows-based PCs as an expansion pack. However, the console versions were cancelled.

On July 10, 2008, Activision merged with Vivendi Games, forming Activision Blizzard. On July 29, 2008, Activision dropped several planned Vivendi Games titles from their productions, one of which was World in Conflict: Soviet Assault, putting the game's future in question.

On August 6, 2008, Activision put Massive Entertainment up for sale. On November 11, Massive was acquired by Ubisoft.
