= World in Conflict =

2007 real-time strategy video game

- Developer: Massive Entertainment
- Publisher: Vivendi Games (Note: Released under the Sierra Entertainment brand name)
- Designer: Magnus Jansén
- Engine: MassTech Game Engine utilising Havok physics
- Platform: Microsoft Windows
- Release: NA: September 18, 2007; AU: September 20, 2007; EU: September 21, 2007
- Genres: Real-time tactics, real-time strategy
- Modes: Single-player, multiplayer

World in Conflict is a 2007 real-time tactics video game developed by the Swedish video game company Massive Entertainment and published by Vivendi Games for Microsoft Windows. The game was released in September 2007, receiving generally favorable reviews and several awards. The game is considered by some to be the spiritual successor of Ground Control, another game by Massive Entertainment, and is generally conceived by its designers to be a real-time tactics game, despite being marketed as a RTS game.

The game's setting and story takes place in an alternate 1989, in which an impending economic collapse and the failure to achieve aid diplomatically from the West, leads the Soviet Union to invade Western Europe, triggering World War III. The single-player story sees players assume the role of a United States Army officer who takes command of battalions of US and NATO forces; the main bulk of their operations focus on combating a surprise invasion of the United States from Seattle, Washington, as well as operations in Southern France, Russia, and New York.

A March 2009 expansion pack, World in Conflict: Soviet Assault, added additional content, including additional campaign missions in which players assume the role of a Soviet military officer who commands Soviet forces in Europe, Russia and the US state of Washington.

The game offers multiplayer functionality, supporting up to 16 players online or over LAN. In December 2015, Ubisoft shut down the official Massgate servers that supported multiplayer functions, though the player community restored these functions in 2016, through an unaffiliated version of Massgate. Ubisoft revived multiplayer through published open-source Massgate in 2017.

== Gameplay ==
A large skirmish battle between NATO and Soviet troops

World in Conflict focuses on real-time tactics (RTT) gameplay, in a similar manner to Ground Control, a game also developed by Massive Entertainment, in which players deploy units onto a battlefield and must carefully make use of them to achieve victory, making use of support assets to further assist them. World in Conflict contains three factions: the United States, Soviet Union, and NATO. While players may only play as US and NATO forces during the single-player campaign, all three factions can be used in multiplayer games.

During a game, players are given a pre-determined number of reinforcement points, with which to purchase units with varying costs. Once the player deploys the units they purchase, they must wait 20 seconds for them to be airdropped to the field. If a unit is destroyed, the points are refunded to the player in order to allow them to bring in more units. During the single-player campaign, most missions vary what units the player can recruit, while some missions will offer the opportunity to recruit free units, though these cannot be replaced if destroyed. Each unit has strengths and weaknesses, such as mobile anti-air guns being most effective against enemy helicopters, and repair tanks being most effective at keeping vehicles and armor repaired. Each unit possesses a defensive ability, such as deploying smokescreens, while some units possess an offensive ability, such as marking targets for bombardment or using grenade launchers on enemy infantry. Once a unit's special ability(ies) has been spent, players must wait for them to recharge before they can be used again.

In addition to controlling units, players may also call in tactical aid by spending tactical aid points. Points are primarily earned from destroying enemy units in battle. Tactical Aids allow the player to call in anything, from airstrikes on enemy positions, the deployment of paratroopers, to launching carpet bombing raids and tactical nuclear strikes. Tactical aids can allow up to three deployments, after which the player must wait until the support has recharged. In the single-player campaign, players are restricted by what tactical aid they can use, which can change during a mission.

The game interface for World in Conflict has no framing in the game. A list of units occupies the bottom center, whereas the top right-hand corner contains the expandable reinforcement procurement list. The mini-map is in the bottom left-hand corner, while the bottom right-hand corner contains the special abilities buttons (including unit formation). Players can also use a messaging system that is designed to allow conversation between individuals regardless of whether they are on the same server or playing the same game. World in Conflict features a fully rotational 360-degree camera.

=== Single-player ===
The single-player campaign places players in the role of Lieutenant Parker (voiced by Alec Baldwin), a United States Army officer, who takes command of a company of troops from both the US and NATO and who narrates the events of the game's campaign prior to each mission; he neither speaks during missions and cutscenes nor is his face shown. During missions, players take on enemies scripted for them to deal with while the AI handles the remainder of action on the battlefield, though a large portion of the action is still focused on the player, which is in contrast to the approach used in RTS titles, in which players are in charge of whole armies and thus responsible for most of the action on the battlefield. Unlike other game modes, players are restricted in missions by what units they can deploy and what tactical aid they can call in, sometimes having to rely on the units they begin with and acquire during a mission.

The narrative of the single-player story owes much of its inspiration from both the Call of Duty and Medal of Honor series (see the 'Influences' section below)

=== Multiplayer ===
Multiplayer games support up to sixteen players and can be played on a LAN or over the Internet. Three types of maps are featured: domination maps, where players must control command points to win the game, assault maps, where one team defends a series of command points which the other teams' assaults, and tug of war maps, where teams must fight to capture a series of command points on the front line, whereupon the line shifts towards a new set of points closer to the losing team. One side plays as either the United States or NATO, while the other is the Soviet Union.

In multiplayer gameplay the player may choose one of four roles in battle: infantry, air, support, or armor. The infantry role gives access to various infantry squads such as anti-tank teams, snipers, and light transport vehicles whereas armor allows players to use various classes of tanks, the dominant direct fire land combat unit of the game. Players choosing the air role have access to attack, scout, and transport helicopters. Finally, the support role contains anti-air, artillery, and repair units. Each role's basic units can be purchased by everyone but are more expensive for players with a different role. In addition, each role has its own exclusive units that aren't available for purchase by other roles.

The game ends when one side is completely dominant over the other, or when 20 minutes are up, in which case, whichever side is winning at the time is declared the winner. A bar is displayed at the top of the screen showing the status of both armies. After the game is over, the score sheet will be displayed, and the players' rank updated.

The online component of the game uses the in-game massgate system, which is derived from Ground Control. The system helps players keep track of friends, allowing them to see whether they are online or playing a game. Clans can be created and kept track of in-game, with features such as ranks and clan matches. Massgate includes leaderboards and a ranking system based on US Army military ranks. Players can increase their rank and leaderboard position in a way similar to Battlefield 2, by accumulating earnings and scoring points, medals, and badges. Achieving higher ranks becomes progressively more difficult. The leaderboard also keeps track of clan rankings.

== Plot ==
In 1988, the economically crippled Soviet Union pursues military action against NATO. The United States deploys the bulk of its troops to reinforce Europe, but in doing so, is caught off guard when the Soviet Union invades the Northwestern United States, starting with Seattle in November 1989. Lieutenant Parker, the player's character, joins Captains Mark Bannon and James Webb in the retreat from the city under Colonel Jeremiah Sawyer, who held previous commands over all three. Under Sawyer's command, the Soviet advance is temporarily stalled, and the U.S. manages to win a tactical victory in the town of Pine Valley with intervention from the USS Missouri.

By Christmas, Soviet troops launch a new offensive to capture Fort Teller, the headquarters for the Strategic Defense Initiative. Knowing that should the Soviets realize that the project is a ruse (thereby exposing America to a nuclear strike), Sawyer and his command are ordered to intercept, delay and ultimately halt the Soviet advance on the facility. At the garrison town of Cascade Falls, Sawyer leads an initially successful defense against the Soviets. However, he is soon informed the Soviets have deployed fresh reinforcements to the town, which are too many for his already under-strength forces to hold against. Sawyer is granted clearance to detonate a tactical nuclear missile above the Soviet formations, retreating just before impact. Bannon, however, volunteers to stay behind, knowing the Soviets will become suspicious. The nuclear blast annihilates the assaulting Soviet forces, as well as Bannon and his company.

Several months prior to this, Colonel Sawyer is deployed to Southern France to assist NATO forces with American reinforcements in driving the Soviets out near Marseille. Parker, fresh from his training is taken under Sawyer's command, as well as Bannon; presented as arrogant, cocky and eager to fight. Bannon's continuous insistence on close action with the Russians irks Sawyer, but ultimately leads to the death of Commandant Sabatier, the French liaison assigned to Sawyer. Furthermore, during a special operation alongside Norwegian special forces in the Soviet Union, Bannon is responsible for the accidental deaths of several civilians, plus being unable to prevent a Typhoon-class submarine at berth near Murmansk from escaping. Fed up with Bannon's incompetence, Sawyer intends once the battalion returns home to have Bannon reassigned. But before this can happen, the battalion is rerouted to New York City to assist U.S. Army Rangers in recapturing Ellis, Governors and Liberty Islands from Spetsnaz commandos.

Returning to the immediate aftermath of the nuclear detonation, Parker contacts Webb and several friendly and hostile stragglers before reuniting with Sawyer. They also learn that China has entered the war, siding with the Soviets, and has sent a fleet to reinforce the Soviet beachhead in Seattle. The U.S. President orders Sawyer's forces to retake Seattle before the Chinese can land, but also plans to destroy the Chinese fleet and the city of Seattle with a nuclear missile should Sawyer fail. After successfully penetrating through the Soviet perimeter, U.S. forces successfully re-capture the city. The Chinese, lacking the amphibious means necessary for a landing, turn back.

== Development ==
In December 2015, the official Massgate servers were shut down by Massive Entertainment for several reasons, despite a community outcry.

In early 2016, online multiplayer functionality and a new community-run Massgate were restored by a group of players unaffiliated with Ubisoft or Massive Entertainment.

=== Influences ===
The game's designers have cited the 1984 film Red Dawn as one of their key influences. The film's main premise is the invasion of America by Soviet and Central American troops. Echoes of the film can be seen in the initial paratroop landings (though in the film they happen in Colorado) and in the use of civilian transports to disguise a Soviet invasion force; again, this differs slightly from the film. Also, in the Soviet Assault expansion, the name of the Soviet invasion of Germany (and presumably the United States) is referred to as Operation Red Dawn.

Another influence for the game, according to issue 7 of the WiC Journal, are the first-person shooter game series Call of Duty and Medal of Honor, and how the games give the player a relatively small role in a big conflict and will command small numbers of units at a time rather than whole hordes. The developers, still according to the journal, have also looked to the games Battlefield 2 and Counter-Strike: Source for inspiration.

=== Marketing ===
The collector's edition of World in Conflict comes in a limited edition collector's box art cloth packaging (with a Soviet flag on one side and Russian wording of "World in Conflict", and the US flag on the other with English "World in Conflict") and includes an authentic piece of the Berlin Wall, Modern Marvels: The Berlin Wall DVD by the History Channel, Behind the Scenes DVD and World in Conflict exclusive Creative HS-390 headset (Europe Only). Those who had preordered the game were given access to the Beta, the ability to preserve their username and clans, and either received the Modern Marvels: Strategic Air Command or the Declassified: The Rise and Fall of The Wall DVD by the History Channel depending upon which area of the world one was situated in.

The collector's edition in Poland is different compared to collector's editions in other countries. It includes an exclusive World in Conflict wooden container, limited edition collector's box art packaging (Soviet or US flag), a full-sized flag of the US or Soviet Union, an exclusive World in Conflict poster, a T-shirt and cap with the World in Conflict logo and decorations, and a World in Conflict exclusive Trust Hs-2200 headset.

The collector's edition available in Taiwan is also different, as there was no preorder scheme put into place there. It includes an exclusive flag of the Soviet Union, a Modern Marvels: Strategic Air Command DVD by the History Channel, Special translated behind the scenes DVD, Metallic packaging featuring the Soviet flag on the front, and the US flag on the back.

The game was re-released under World in Conflict Complete Edition including the new expansion Soviet Assault all in one game.

== Reception ==
Reception

Aggregate score
Aggregator	Score
Metacritic	89/100

Review scores
Publication	Score
Eurogamer	9/10
Game Informer	9.25/10
GameSpot	9.5/10
IGN	9.3/10
PC Gamer (UK)	88/100
PC Gamer (US)	93/100
PC PowerPlay	9/10
PC Zone	92/100
X-Play	4/5
Games for Windows	8/10

World in Conflict received "generally favorable reviews" from game critics according to the review aggregator Metacritic. GameSpot called the game "the studio's masterwork", giving it 9.5 out of 10. In PC Gamer, Kieron Gillen singled out World in Conflict's multiplayer, praising the cooperative mechanics and the in-game communication system; while calling the single-player campaign "fun[...] but not exactly deep." Dan Whitehead of Eurogamer called the game "absorbing", highlighting the game's focus on tactical objectives instead of resource management, saying "it plays like a strategy game, but feels like an action game".

=== Awards ===
Prior to its initial release in September 2007, World in Conflict received several awards from its E3 presentation in 2007.

- IGN: Best PC Strategy Game, Best Strategy Game (All Platforms), Best Of E3 2007
- GameSpot: Best Strategy Game Of E3, E3'07 Editors Choice Award
- GameTrailers: Best Strategy Game Of E3
- Game Critics: E3 2007 Best Strategy Game, The Best Of E3 07 Winner

After release, the game earned editor's choice awards from GameSpot, IGN and the Australian gaming magazine PC PowerPlay, as well as PC Zone's classic award. PC Gamer US also awarded the game its editor's choice award, as well as naming it the 2007 RTS game of the year. During the 11th Annual Interactive Achievement Awards, World in Conflict received nominations for "Strategy/Simulation Game of the Year" and "Outstanding Achievement in Online Gameplay" by the Academy of Interactive Arts & Sciences. The game was included in the book 1001 Video Games You Must Play Before You Die.

=== Sales ===
It topped weekly sales charts in North America, Germany, and Australia in the week it was released.

== Expansion ==
A new expansion of the game, World in Conflict: Soviet Assault, was released for Windows in March 2009. There had been plans to release the game under the same name for home consoles, the Xbox 360 and the PlayStation 3, but were dropped. The new edition included a brand new campaign from the Soviet perspective. New maps were included as well as new movies and cut scenes, however there were no new units included.

On July 29, 2008, Activision dropped World in Conflict: Soviet Assault from production along with a number of other games putting the future of the game in question. On August 6, 2008, Activision Blizzard put Massive Entertainment up for sale. Massive Entertainment has since been acquired by Ubisoft. The game was released on March 13, 2009, in several formats. It was packaged under World in Conflict: Complete Edition which is the new retail collection, containing both World in Conflict and the expansion, Soviet Assault. The complete pack was available through retail stores, Steam download and Direct2Drive download. Soviet Assault was also released separately as a download for owners of the original World in Conflict, through Steam and D2D and also in a retail version.
