= Massive Entertainment =

Swedish video game developer

Massive Entertainment AB
- Type: Subsidiary
- Industry: Video games
- Founded: 1997; 29 years ago
- Founder: Martin Walfisz
- Headquarters: Malmö, Sweden
- Key people: Thomas Andrén (managing director)
- Number of employees: 750+ (2023)
- Parent: Vivendi Games (2002–2008); Activision (2008); Ubisoft (2008–present)
- Website: massive.se

Massive Entertainment AB is a Swedish video game developer and a studio of Ubisoft based in Malmö. The company has been fully owned by Ubisoft since 2008. The studio is known for Tom Clancy's The Division, The Division 2, Ground Control, and World in Conflict. In 2026, Ubisoft named one of its new Creative Houses as Massive Entertainment, with the existing studio leading development within the division over the Tom Clancy's games.

== History ==
Massive Entertainment was founded in 1997 by Martin Walfisz. In 1999, they provided support with 3D technology for the video game Odens öga (translated to Eye of Odin), developed by BigBite Interactive. In June 2000, Massive released the award-winning PC action-strategy title Ground Control, published by Sierra Studios. The same year an expansion was released named Ground Control: Dark Conspiracy.

In 2002, the studio was acquired by Vivendi Universal Games through their NDA Productions subsidiary. In October 2007, they released the game World in Conflict, described as a further development of the real-time tactics gameplay formula from the Ground Control games, but set on Earth during an alternate history late Cold War. The game was released on 18 September 2007 and won critical acclaim, including nominations for one of the best games of 2007. It was followed by an expansion, World in Conflict: Soviet Assault. In December 2007, the studio moved into new offices on Drottninggatan in Malmö, employing 130 people at the time.

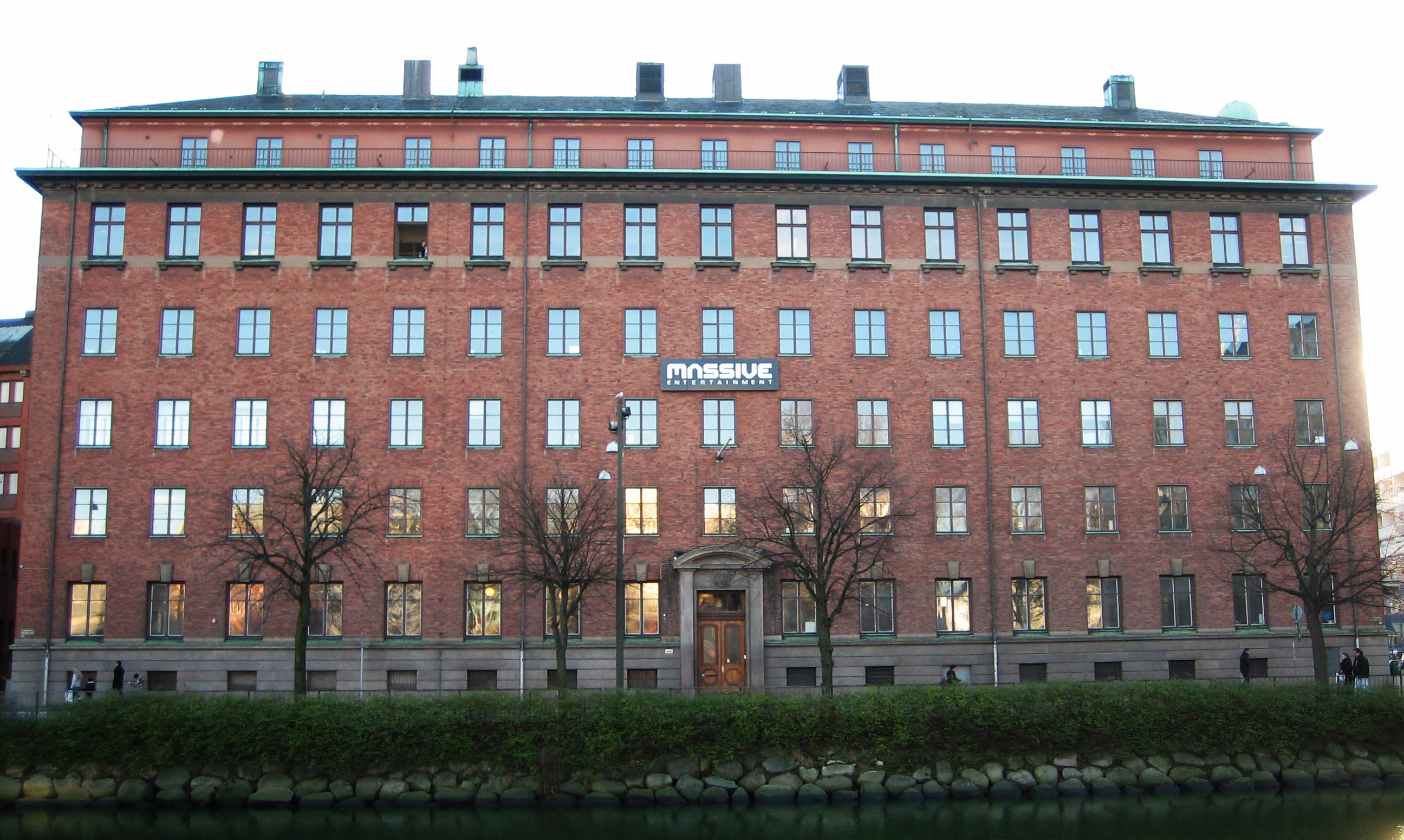
Massive's former headquarters on Drottninggatan in Malmö (pictured in 2008). During its occupancy, from December 2007 to April 2020, the studio grew from 130 to more than 650 employees.

On 6 August 2008, Activision Blizzard put up Massive Entertainment for sale after the merger of Activision and Vivendi Games and the subsequent internal reorganization. On 10 November 2008, Ubisoft acquired Massive Entertainment. In March 2009, following the acquisition, the former CEO Martin Walfisz left the company.

In December 2010, Ubisoft confirmed that Massive would be working on an Assassin's Creed project. On 5 May 2011, it was announced that Massive Entertainment was collaborating on development of Assassin's Creed: Revelations, developing the Desmond's journey sequences in the game, which was released in November 2011. Massive also collaborated on the development of Far Cry 3, which was released in December 2012.

At E3 2013 Massive announced their next game, Tom Clancy's The Division. The game was released on 8 March 2016 and sold more copies in its first 24 hours than any game in Ubisoft's history, the biggest first week for a new game franchise, generating $330 million in its first five days.

In March 2017, Massive announced that their next major title would be based on James Cameron's Avatar. The game was revealed at E3 2021 to be titled Avatar: Frontiers of Pandora and released on 7 December 2023.

In April 2020, Massive and its more than 650 staff moved from the offices on Drottninggatan to Kvarteret Eden, a former textile factory in Malmö's Möllevången district.

In January 2021, the newly reformed Lucasfilm Games announced that Massive started work on a new Star Wars open world title. This would be the first Star Wars game outside of Electronic Arts since they acquired a May 2013 contract to produce all Star Wars related titles. This would later be revealed as Star Wars Outlaws, and it released in August of 2024.

Ubisoft underwent a large-scale restructuring of its company in January 2026, dividing its studios among five creative houses. Creative House 2 became known as Massive Entertainment, with the existing Massive Entertainment studio being one of the leading development teams within the Creative House.

== Technology ==
Massive Entertainment developed the Snowdrop engine which was first used for Tom Clancy's The Division in 2016. The engine continues to be in used as of 2026 with Rayman Legends Retold.

== Games developed ==
Year	Title	Platform(s)	Publisher(s)	Notes	Ref.
2000	Ground Control	Windows	Sierra Studios	Also co-developed the expansion pack Dark Conspiracy (2000) with High Voltage Software	
2002	Drömjobbet i Rosemond Valley	Windows	Levande Böcker, PAN Interactive	Translated from Swedish: The Dream Job in Rosemond Valley	
2004	Ground Control II: Operation Exodus	Windows	Vivendi Universal Games	—N/a	
2007	World in Conflict	Windows	Vivendi Games	Also developed the expansion pack Soviet Assault (2009)	
2011	Assassin's Creed: Revelations	Nintendo Switch, PlayStation 3, PlayStation 4, Windows, Xbox 360, Xbox One	Ubisoft	Supportive development for Ubisoft Montréal	
2012	Far Cry 3	PlayStation 3, PlayStation 4, Windows, Xbox 360, Xbox One	Ubisoft	Supportive development for Ubisoft Montréal	
2014	Just Dance Now	Android, iOS, Tizen, tvOS	Ubisoft	Co-developed with Ubisoft Paris	
2016	Tom Clancy's The Division	PlayStation 4, Windows, Xbox One	Ubisoft	—N/a	
2019	Tom Clancy's The Division 2	PlayStation 4, Stadia, Windows, Xbox One	Ubisoft	—N/a	
2023	Avatar: Frontiers of Pandora	PlayStation 5, Windows, Xbox Series X/S	Ubisoft	—N/a	
2024	Star Wars Outlaws	Nintendo Switch 2, PlayStation 5, Windows, Xbox Series X/S	Ubisoft	—N/a	
TBA	Tom Clancy's The Division 3	TBA	Ubisoft	—N/a	

=== Cancelled ===
- 9 Worlds (Xbox, PlayStation 2)
