= Warno (video game) =

2024 video game

- Developer: Eugen Systems
- Publisher: Eugen Systems
- Director: Alexis Le Dressay
- Engine: Iriszoom
- Platform: Windows
- Release: 23 May 2024
- Genres: Real-time strategy, real-time tactics, turn-based strategy
- Modes: Single-player, multiplayer

Warno is a 2024 real-time tactics and turn-based strategy video game created and published by Eugen Systems, released into early access on 20 January 2022, and fully released on May 23, 2024. A spiritual successor to Wargame: European Escalation, also developed by Eugen, it takes place in a Cold War gone hot setting along the Inner German Border and Czechoslovakia, portraying a conventional conflict between NATO and the Warsaw Pact.

== Gameplay ==
Warno is a strategy game with a real-time tactical layer (for the missions & map levels) and a turn-based strategic layer (for the Army General campaigns). Players control individual units meant to represent historical military vehicles and infantry formations of the Cold War. There are many game modes in Warno focusing on various goals, such as acquiring an amount of points from objectives in the Conquest mode or destroying a number of enemy units in Destruction. The game is played by anywhere between 1 and 20 people, with multiplayer games scaling up to 10 versus 10. Single-player play takes the form of skirmishes against the AI, scripted battles set in specific places, and a turn-based strategic campaign.

In both multiplayer and single-player modes, all players receive a ticking income of points to spend on deployable units, such as infantry, artillery, tanks, reconnaissance units, air defense units, attack helicopters, helicopter-borne infantry, and aircraft. The units available to the player depend on their chosen battlegroup. Various battlegroups have different specializations, such as a focus on infantry combat or combined arms warfare. Some basic unit functions can be assigned to the AI, but a majority of actions are done by the player. Units are controlled in real time.

The playable formations (known as 'Battlegroups') in game are inspired from the orders of battle of divisions, regiments, and some corps that would have likely engaged each other during the initial stages of war along the German border in the year 1989, such as the American 11th Armored Cavalry Regiment or the Soviet 79th Guards Tank Division. NATO forces are exclusively those based out of CENTAG, the NATO formation which served in Central Europe, especially Germany.

While the tactical gameplay is similar to Wargame, Warno has received considerable quality of life improvements and gameplay changes seen in the Steel Division titles, including allowing the AI to carry out smart orders for player units, the reworked deck system incorporating the orders of battle of in-game divisions, and variants and traits of units in the armory. Warno also incorporated dedicated single-player content, such as (turn-based) Army General campaigns and (real-time) Operations, from Steel Division 2. The game includes a basic map editor for player use which allows for simple asset manipulation.

== Plot ==
The story of Warno takes place in an alternate world of 1989. The point of divergence is in April 1987 when hardliners stage a coup against Mikhail Gorbachev due to his perestroika reforms. The Communist Party, KGB, and Soviet Army form a troika to restore glory to the Soviet Union. Unrest in the Baltic and Armenia is crushed and, spurred on by the inaction of the West, the USSR launches a takeover of Finland, installing a pro-Soviet government and bringing that country firmly in their sphere of influence. This spurs the West, led by the United States under Ronald Reagan, to increase military spending. Western sanctions and increased military spending leads to food shortages and an oil crisis in the Soviet Union. Meanwhile, NATO plans to conduct a larger than ever Exercise Reforger in September 1989, which the paranoid troika fears is a cover for conflict. Under the cover of their own Zapad exercise in the summer, the Warsaw Pact prepares to strike first.

Across the Inner German Border and the other borders between NATO countries and those of the Warsaw Pact, attacks erupt.
