= Act of War: High Treason =

Expansion pack for Act of War: Direct Action

- Developer: Eugen Systems
- Publisher: Atari
- Designer: Alexis Le Dressay
- Series: Act of War: Direct Action
- Platform: Windows
- Release: EU: March 24, 2006; AU: March 2006; NA: May 30, 2006
- Genre: Real-time strategy
- Modes: Single-player, multiplayer

Act of War: High Treason is an expansion pack for Act of War: Direct Action. It was developed by Eugen Systems and published by Atari. It was released in the PAL region in March 2006 and in North America on May 30, 2006.

== Plot ==
Act of War: High Treason takes place over the course of three days, three years after the events of Act of War: Direct Action. On the eve of the U.S. Presidential election, the two presidential candidates, Senator Watts and Vice President Joshua Cardiff are attacked. Task Force Talon intervenes and rescues both, but in the meantime, President Baldwin is assassinated. Thus, Vice President Cardiff becomes the new President of the United States. Later, Senator Watts disappears and is announced dead by officials.

In the aftermath, several important government officials and U.S. Army personnel are arrested on conspiracy and assassination charges, but Colonel Whitemore, leader of the military unit in charge of Senator Watts is conveniently not questioned. Task Force Talon tries to meet him in Fort McCoy, Wisconsin, but the U.S. Army forces open fire on the task force units and they are branded as traitors. Task Force Talon tracks Whitemore's C-17 Globemaster transports carrying a shipment of USAMRIID biological barrels to Cancún, Mexico. The recipient is the Consortium, a highly advanced and well-funded shadowy military organization, which was assumed eradicated in the events of the previous game. The cargo contains X-357, a virus deadly to many animals, but harmless to humans. Task Force Talon commandeers a Consortium Visby-class corvette and pursues a trio of Consortium Typhoon-class submarines carrying the biological samples, one of which eludes them and reaches Cuba. With aid from the U.S. Navy, Task Force Talon raids a Consortium hacienda in search of the last submarine and its payload.

Although Task Force Talon does not find X-357, they find and liberate Senator Watts. Transferring him to a friendly U.S. naval base in the Bahamas, Watts exposes the Consortium and Cardiff as the conspirators on a live television show. The U.S. Navy defends the naval base against the Consortium onslaught until Watts finishes his speech and is evacuated to Washington D.C., where he testifies in the U.S. Congress. Meanwhile, X-357 is tracked to Cape Canaveral, where it is scheduled for launch into space via the Space Shuttle Liberty, where the Consortium can mutate it to infect human hosts.

Task Force Talon fails to stop the launch and is attacked by the 52nd, 104th and 81st Airborne divisions guarding the launch site. Not long later, however, the Congress impeaches Cardiff. Subsequently, the loyal 52nd and 81st cease firing on Task Force Talon, but the 104th, under the command of Colonel Whitemore, continues fighting, only to be destroyed. Space Shuttle Liberty is tracked to its landing zone in the Taklamakan Desert in central Asia, where the Consortium's main base of operations is located. The U.S. Army and a small Task Force Talon unit invade the landing site, and eradicate the virus along with the rest of the Consortium forces. The epilogue reveals that Cardiff's body is found in the Potomac River assassinated by the Consortium prior to Task Force Talon's assault, while Senator Watts's presidential campaign is virtually unopposed.

== Factions ==
Factions of Act of War: High Treason have received additional units that greatly eliminates their differences. Given their loyalties, they are now either fully Americans, or mostly Americans with part-American equipment. Whatever difference is left between the factions can be closed by hiring mercenary units from a specialized building.

U.S. Army
In Act of War: High Treason, the U.S. Army is a general term for the conventional fighting forces of the United States, including the Army, Navy, Air Force and Marines. Armed with solid conventional weaponry, the U.S. Army boasts unparalleled strength. However, they are not as flexible as Task Force Talon or the Consortium. The U.S. Army uses a different type specialized unit for each type of task.

Task Force Talon
Task Force Talon is a secretive joint task force and a direct action force. Utilizing futuristic weapons and technology, they can be deployed anywhere in the world quickly. Task Force Talon uses multi-role units, so that each unit of the task force is versatile and capable of handling more than one type of mission.

Consortium
A very large underground military organization with ever more immense funding, the Consortium pursues its own agenda through a combination of terrorist attacks and conventional military action. Their force is a blend of powerful Soviet bloc equipment and extremely advanced technology on par with Task Force Talon, including secret projects from both Russia and the United States.

== New multiplayer modes ==
- Marine One Down: The objective of this game is to capture the President. Any player who gets a unit within a certain distance gains control of the President. The objective is to move the POTUS unit to a pre-defined evacuation base at the edge of the map, with each player needing to bring the President to a different location. There is no base building in this mode; instead, players capture bunkers scattered around the map to gain reinforcements.
- Scud launcher: This mode is basically the same as a regular game, but with a twist: All players are unable to build Tactical Weapons and Anti-Tactical weapons, but in the middle of the map, there is a neutral Scud launcher with a circle around it. Anyone who gets within the circle gains control of the Scud, this allows that player to fire the Scud every 2 minutes. Should the launcher be destroyed, it will explode violently, causing tremendous damage to everything within a very large radius, which prevents players from keeping the launcher safe in their base.

== Reception ==
Reception

Aggregate score
Aggregator	Score
Metacritic	74 of 100

Review scores
Publication	Score
1Up.com	B−
4Players	80%
Eurogamer	5 of 10
GameSpot	8 of 10
GameStar	80%
Jeuxvideo.com	15 of 20
PC Format	79%
PC Gamer (UK)	67%
PC Games (DE)	57%

The game received "mixed or average reviews" according to the review aggregation website Metacritic.
