= Act of War: Direct Action =

2005 video game

- European cover art
- Developer: Eugen Systems
- Publisher: Atari
- Designer: Alexis Le Dressay
- Platform: Windows
- Release: NA: 15 March 2005; EU: 18 March 2005
- Genre: Real-time strategy
- Modes: Single-player, multiplayer

Act of War: Direct Action is a real-time strategy game developed by Eugen Systems and published by Atari. The game was released in March 2005 and features a detailed story written by Dale Brown, a retired captain of the United States Air Force and a bestselling author. An expansion pack called Act of War: High Treason was released in March 2006 in Europe and Australia, and in May 2006 in North America. The original game and expansion were later released as Act of War: Gold Edition, on 28 September 2007 in Europe. In September 2015 Eugen Systems released Act of Aggression which is considered a spiritual successor to Act of War.

== Gameplay ==
The game includes a combination of pre-rendered cut-scenes and over an hour of live action film. Live action was shot in Montreal, Quebec, Canada during the summer of 2004. Pre-rendered cut-scenes were done using machinima technique, wherein one person plays while being recorded from different angles (with all interface elements hidden). The recorded video is then post-processed and provided with sound effects and dialog.

In Act of War, heavily wounded soldiers are immobilized and are unable to engage in combat until they receive medical attention. They may bleed to death or be taken as the prisoners of war by the enemy. Buildings are realistically destructible and barricades can be created. Unlike RTS games in which all-around-effective units may be mass-produced and used almost exclusively over other units, Act of War requires the player to use a variety of units.

The soundtrack is composed by Marc Canham and Jonathan Williams, and performed at Nimrod Studio Orchestra. It was released on 7 July 2006.

== Plot ==
Act of War is set in what is only referred to as "a near future" (presumably 2017 or 2023, since the game starts on Wednesday, 10 May) where gasoline prices in the United States have reached over $7 a gallon due to a global economic crisis. One week before the "World Energy Forum" meeting in London, a terrorist bombing destroys an oil facility in Houston. As such, an elite top-secret military unit known as Task Force Talon is assigned to guard the World Energy Forum, which is attacked by terrorists hiding amongst the anti-WEF protestors. Two VIPs are kidnapped in the attack: Arthur Kingman, CEO of TransGlobal Energy corporation (TGE), and Yegor Zakharov, the CEO of a rival oil company. Task Force Talon manages to recover these VIP before they are apparently murdered. Later, an unknown terrorist faction launches a massive military assault in San Francisco. With the aid of Task Force Talon, the attackers are eventually neutralized.

To protect against further attacks on American soil, the U.S. government orders a recall of all military forces deployed overseas. However, the commander of Task Force Talon, Major Jason Richter, suspects the terrorist attack was designed to force the recall order, noticing the primary target of the latest terrorist attacks had been TGE, the oil company on the verge of resolving the oil crisis. Therefore, Major Richter goes against executive orders from the U.S. president and deploys Task Force Talon forces to Egypt, where they gather enough intelligence to convince the President to support their pre-emptive action and also defend the TGE oil refinery complex in Egypt, deploying cutting-edge military technology against an enemy that now possesses self-propelled artillery and stealth tanks.

During the battle in Egypt, Task Force Talon discovers the identity of their enemy: the Consortium - a shadow organization of joint oil companies banking terrorist forces as a third party - which is led by Zakharov, who owns two of the labs that produced stealth tanks. The United States government, Task Force Talon and the Russian government launch a joint assault against Zakharov, whom started an uprising in Russia and is now in possession of a full army, a small air force and even 9K720 Iskander ballistic missiles. Through the joint effort, Zakharov is eventually captured.

Major Richter personally takes Zakharov to the United States. Upon arrival, however, he finds Washington, D.C. under the military occupation of the Consortium. Even as the U.S. forces struggle to liberate the United States Capitol, the 81st U.S. Armored Division, taken over by the Consortium, rescues Zakharov and occupies the White House area. The President attempts to escape but the Marine One helicopter is shot down, forcing Task Force Talon to rush to his rescue. Eventually, the U.S. Army and Task Force Talon mount a counter-attack on the Consortium-occupied White House, facing cutting-edge enemy technology that is supposed to be top-secret U.S. and Russian prototypes. Even as they reclaim the White House, Zakharov unleashes the Falling Star, a space-based superweapon. Having deployed Patriot batteries to counter the Falling Star, Task Force Talon and the United States Army deploy cruise missiles to destroy Zakharov's base. Zakharov is discovered dead after Major Richter, standing atop of a massive smoldering crater, orders a DNA analysis of the remains.

== Factions ==
=== United States military ===
The United States military is the conventional war machine of Act of War with familiar (as of the game's release date) military units like the marines, AH-64 Apache and M1 Abrams main battle tank. The only exception is the F-22 Raptor, which is not featured in the game. United States military in possession of the greatest number of units and upgrades, each of which are specialized for a certain role. For example, the F-15 can only attack other air units, although it is the best fighter aircraft unit in the game. Meanwhile, the sniper is very effective against infantry but ineffective against anything else. While not necessarily a true weakness, the US Military has an obligation to follow DEFCON procedures. To access its full strength, it must upgrade to DEFCON 2 and then to DEFCON 1, each of which are expensive.

=== Task Force Talon ===
Task Force Talon is a top-secret U.S. military branch, equipped with cutting-edge hardware. It includes units that, at the time of the game's release, were either cutting-edge, experimental or fictional. These units include Global Hawk (an unmanned stealth drone) S.H.I.E.L.D. Unit (an infantryman wearing an exoskeleton suit equipped with both machine guns and rockets) and Spinner Tank (a tank with customizable weapons).

Task Force Talon focuses on versatility. For example, the Global Hawk can be upgraded with anti-tank missiles to harass enemy vehicles while performing recon. This versatility however, comes at high cost: Task Force Talon units and upgrades are very expensive for good reasons and the AI is unable to use most Task Force Talon units properly because all late game units requires some basic micromanagement and strategic planning. Therefore, losing too many units early in a game due to misuse and poor strategic choices quickly decide the outcome of the battle.

=== Consortium ===
The Consortium is a shadowy organization with unknown origins and objectives. The branch of the Consortium featured in this game consists of terrorist groups and a renegade Russian army offshoot, supported by oil companies bent on creating an oil monopoly as well as manipulating political events for personal gain. This branch is led by Yegor Zakharov, the game's primary antagonist. However, it is hinted (and later confirmed in Act of War: High Treason) that there are other Consortium branches.

The Consortium operates in two alert status modes: Undercover and Revealed. In undercover mode, the Consortium resorts to hiring mercenaries, terrorists and certain governments into doing their dirty work, relying more on massing inexpensive units such as infantry units initially equipped with AK-74 (customizable after purchasing) as well as surplus military hardware provide versatility in battle. In revealed mode, however, the Consortium deploys high-tech combat equipment such as YF-23 Black Widow II (a stealth aircraft) Akula Stealth Tank (a cloaked tank armed with twin railguns) and Optical-Camo Soldier (an infantry unit wearing active camouflage).

== Reception ==
Reception

Aggregate score
| Aggregator | Score |
|---|---|
| Metacritic | 82/100 |

Review scores
| Publication | Score |
|---|---|
| Computer Games Magazine | 4.5/5 |
| Computer Gaming World | 4/5 |
| Eurogamer | 8/10 |
| Game Informer | 8.25/10 |
| GamePro | 3.5/5 |
| GameSpot | 8.5/10 |
| GameSpy | 3.5/5 |
| GameZone | 8.6/10 |
| IGN | 8.5/10 |
| PC Gamer (US) | 82% |

The game received "favourable" reviews according to the review aggregation website Metacritic.

It was a runner-up for Computer Games Magazine's list of 2005's top 10 computer games.
