= War Games (novel) =

War Games is a novel by Karl Hansen published in 1981.

== Plot summary ==
War Games is a novel in which Detrs kills his sadistic parents and becomes a criminal before joining up for a war on Titan.

== Reception ==
Greg Costikyan reviewed War Games in Ares Magazine #10 and commented that "War Games is involving and evocative; Hansen's descriptions of the Titanian scenery are believable and even lyrical."

== Reviews ==
- Review by Theodore Sturgeon (1981) in Rod Serling's The Twilight Zone Magazine, October 1981
