= Eugen Systems =

French video game developer

- Eugen Systems logo
- Type: Private
- Industry: Video games
- Founded: January 2000
- Founder: Alexis Le Dressay; Cedric Le Dressay
- Headquarters: Paris, France
- Products: Act of War series R.U.S.E. Wargame series Steel Division series
- Number of employees: 26
- Website: eugensystems.com

Eugen Systems is a French video game developer based in Paris, France. It was founded in January 2000 by the brothers Alexis Le Dressay, a DPLG architect, and Cedric Le Dressay, a software engineer. The company currently focuses on developing real-time strategy games for the PC and Macintosh platforms, but also has developed games for the PlayStation 3 and Xbox 360 in the past.

== List of video games ==
Year	Title	Platforms				Publisher
Year	Title	Microsoft	Sony	Apple	Other	Publisher
2000	Times of Conflict	Windows	No	No	No	Microids
2002	The Gladiators: Galactic Circus Games	Windows	No	No	No	Arxel Tribe, Tri Synergy
2005	Act of War: Direct Action	Windows	No	No	No	Atari
2006	Act of War: High Treason	Windows	No	No	No	Atari
2010	R.U.S.E.	Windows, Xbox 360	PS3	No	No	Ubisoft
2012	Wargame: European Escalation	Windows	No	MacOS	Linux	Focus Home Interactive / Eugen Systems
2013	Wargame: AirLand Battle	Windows	No	MacOS	Linux	Focus Home Interactive / Eugen Systems
2014	Wargame: Red Dragon	Windows	No	MacOS	Linux	Focus Home Interactive / Eugen Systems
2015	Act of Aggression	Windows	No	No	No	Eugen Systems
2017	Steel Division: Normandy 44	Windows	No	No	No	Paradox Interactive
2019	Steel Division 2	Windows	No	No	No	Eugen Systems
2024	WARNO	Windows	No	No	No	Eugen Systems

== 2018 strike ==
On February 14, 2018, a statement was released through Le Syndicat des Travailleurs et Travailleuses du Jeu Vidéo (STJV, Union of Video Game Workers) in which 21 out of 44 workers claimed that Eugen Systems had denied overtime pay, delayed paychecks, reduced gross wages below French minimum wage requirements, and failed to honour contractual and collectively bargained obligations, and that they were going on strike until their demands were met. Eugen Systems released a statement denying the majority of these allegations, but admitting to two instances of delayed payrolls due to technical issues, rather than malicious intent.

STJV set up a crowdfunding campaign to raise money to support the employees on strike. Employees who were on strike met at each other's homes to support each other and plan meetings with the press, labour advocates, and politicians. Staff representative Félix Habert stated that it took two weeks for Eugen Systems leadership to approach him and others to resolve the issues, and the first meeting did not take place until March 5. A statement from STJV about this meeting stated that Eugen Systems denied that the employees' contracts were accurate or enforceable, and that the following day they sent a proposal for ending the strike that was "incomplete" and "not serious."

Le Monde reported that politician Sébastien Leclerc and the wife of Cedric Le Dressay, one of the co-founders of Eugen Systems, who called for the strike to end were suspected politically connected and that she was one of his supporters during the 2017 election campaign, creating a potential conflict of interest.

On April 3, 2018, the strike was ended by employees saying: "We do not think we will gain any additional ground with this strike, despite the fact our grievances are simply about conforming to labour laws and collective labour agreements". Fifteen of the 21 employees sought to take their grievances to the French Labour Court. The website for collecting donations was shut down a few days after this announcement.
