= Ground Control: Dark Conspiracy =

- Developer(s): Massive Entertainment; High Voltage Software
- Publisher(s): Sierra On-Line
- Platform(s): Microsoft Windows
- Release: NA: December 1, 2000; EU: 2000
- Genre(s): Real-time tactics
- Mode(s): Single-player, multiplayer

Ground Control: Dark Conspiracy is an expansion pack to the real-time tactics video game Ground Control released in 2000, developed by Massive Entertainment and High Voltage Software, and published by Sierra Studios. The expansion pack was included free for new purchases of the original game; existing owners were also entitled and merely needed to apply via online form, and was also included as a hard copy in specially-marked boxes.

The largest additions are a new faction, the Phoenix Mercenaries, and a 15-mission single-player campaign that expands on the original storyline. Other changes include extra multiplayer maps, a few more units for the existing factions and more terrain types. Also of note are the changes in the full motion video cutscenes; the parent game had all of its pre-rendered in the game engine. In contrast, the expansion's cutscenes were done by Blur Studio.

== Plot ==
The Phoenix Mercenaries

The campaign begins a few months after the events of the original, with Major Sarah Parker and her comrades looking to get a way off the planet Krig-7b, on which they are stuck. Battling through Order of the New Dawn stragglers and newly arrived Crayven Corporation forces, the initial missions focus on getting deep space communications working, at the end of which Deacon Jared Stone is apparently killed. Sarah avenges his death, but feels the situation is lost as the communications array was also destroyed.

Help arrives in the unlikely form of an Order the New Dawn battlecruiser that suddenly drops out of hyperspace and destroys its Crayven counterpart. The cruiser then dispatches dropships to the planet surface for Sarah and company.

The onboard superior, Cardinal Kila Balor, explains the reason behind the rescue: she would like to hire the aid of Major Parker to destroy a splinter faction, the Second Dawn, which is not recognizing the Order of the New Dawn's authority and is involved in a "dark conspiracy", but the official Order forces cannot move against the faction directly, fearing open civil war. By supplying Major Parker with untraceable information and finances, she can fight the Second Dawn on their behalf in secret. Major Parker accepts and contact is made with the new faction, the Phoenix Mercenaries.

After an eventful campaign across three different planets, Major Parker and her new allies finally destroys the Second Dawn and slay its leader, only to be engaged in a new adventure: amongst the spoils of war, Major Parker finds an imprisoned Enrica Hayes, former director of Crayven forces on Krieg-7b and an antagonist of the original video game. In exchange for her life and freedom, Enrica Hayes reveals that Deacon Stone is still alive and is being held in a prison facility at Calliope's moon.

Major Parker and her mercenary forces invade Calliope's moon in an attempt to liberate Stone. Cardinal Balor and her forces, who want Stone killed for treason take this opportunity to invade at the same time. Thus, a three-sided battle between Crayven Corporation, Order of the New Dawn and Phoenix mercenaries takes place, during which Major Parker rescues Stone. Cardinal Balor herself enters the combat zone but is killed.

In a short scene that takes place afterwards, it is revealed that the mysterious "dark conspiracy" was simply a lie invented by a mysterious person called "M" who has mysterious agendas. The game ends abruptly in a cliffhanger.

== The Phoenix Mercenaries ==
The game manual gives them a brief background and history. They are Crayven outcasts that were relocated to the planet Crim-12, former employees that dissented the corporate structure. The planet had already been mined thoroughly before and was considered worthless in that sense. Left to themselves, the outcasts built a new society using scavenged parts, seized from leftover Order and Crayven holdings.

Others sick of Crayven also joined them, and soon they grew large enough to draw the attention of their original company. Rather than risk hostility, a deal was worked out: Crayven would leave them in peace, and they in turn would take mercenary contracts. The lack of natural resources also led to another peculiarity: they accepted scrap as payment. Under the leadership of a former soldier, they were able to build a rough-looking but effective military.

Within the game, their ground vehicles are hovercar-like (similar to Order ones), characterized by high top speeds and low acceleration. True to their "Phoenix" moniker, a good portion of their inventory consists of incendiary devices, ranging from various plasma-based weaponry to purpose-built vehicles like the Pyro-Dyne flame tank or their white phosphorus artillery units.

=== Gameplay ===
A Swarm group bombarding ground targets

Although their units largely parallel their counterparts, their unique ones are of note. For instance, their Plasma Grenadiers are the only infantry equipped with a mortar-like weapon. Their artillery unit also operates differently; Crayven and Order artillery both fire in bursts of three, while theirs fires one at a time. Although not as quick at destruction, the more regulated firing rate allows for faster target changes.

Additionally, they are the only faction with an aircraft choice that can effectively take on both air and ground targets (excluding infantry), the Swarm. Visually, each squad consists of six very tiny aircraft, each individually weak. The Swarm as per its namesake works best when the squads are clustered into large groups, allowing for massive guided missile barrages.

== Reception ==
Reception

Aggregate score
| Aggregator | Score |
|---|---|
| Metacritic | 77/100 |

Review scores
| Publication | Score |
|---|---|
| GameSpot | 7.9/10 |
| GameZone | 8.5/10 |
| IGN | 8/10 |

The game received "favorable" reviews according to the video game review aggregator website Metacritic.
