= Wargame: Red Dragon =

2014 video game

- Developer: Eugen Systems
- Publisher: Focus Home Interactive
- Engine: IRISZOOM v4
- Platforms: Windows, Linux, OS X
- Release: Windows; April 17, 2014; Linux; May 19, 2014; OS X; June 12, 2014
- Genre: Real-time strategy
- Modes: Single-player, multiplayer

Wargame: Red Dragon is a real-time strategy video game developed by Eugen Systems and originally published by Focus Home Interactive, released on April 17, 2014. It is the sequel to the Wargame: AirLand Battle.

== Gameplay ==
Wargame: Red Dragon is set in East Asia during an alternate history Cold War where the Soviet Union doesn't collapse and featuring five new Asia Pacific factions: China, North Korea, South Korea, Japan and the ANZAC, while six other nations were subsequently added in paid DLCs: Netherlands, Israel, Yugoslavia, Finland, South Africa, and Italy. The battlefield is viewed from a top-down perspective, giving the player an overview of the action. The player can decide which units they want to deploy before a battle, creating a deck of specific individual units. The player can choose from infantry, various forms of armored units, air forces, and naval forces, with further customization available, e.g. choosing between infantry with anti-aircraft or anti-armor capabilities, or whether to deploy air-superiority aircraft or ones suited for supporting ground forces. The opposing sides will typically start on opposite sides of the battlefield, with both parties being awarded an initial number of deployment points, that determine how many units they can spawn at the start of the battle. Units in the game have several attributes such as their amount of fuel or ammunition; if a unit runs out of fuel or ammunition, it will be unable to move or shoot, respectively. Players can manage these attributes by deploying supply units, which repair and re-arm units. Units also have morale which can degrade under heavy attack, reducing the unit's combat effectiveness and potentially causing it to rout, leaving it unresponsive to player commands.

Following initial deployment, players must gradually hold and secure additional designated zones on the map by deploying special command units and supporting forces to them. Holding these zones awards the player with additional deployment points over time, allowing them to bring in additional units during the course of a battle. Any units ordered during the battle will arrive from a specific command point; a deployment zone typically located on the edge of the map from which units ordered will enter the battle. If such a point is lost, the player will be unable to call in reinforcements until it is re-secured. They will lose the game if they possess no units with which to capture a deployment zone. Other ways of losing include running out of units and having fewer points than the enemy at the end of the battle.

== Campaigns ==
Wargame: Red Dragon features five alternate history campaigns where the Cold War escalated in East Asia. In three of the campaigns, the player assumes the role of the U.S. and its allies while the other two have the player command communist forces. Each campaign is self-contained

Busan Pocket (South Korea and the U.S.)

The year is 1987. Chun Doo-hwan reaches the end of his presidential mandate and is willing to step down. He announces his choice of successor but students and liberals, angered at the overstepping of an electoral process began to stage large scale protests demanding elections. The South Korean government deploys the army to Seoul in hopes of restoring order but this soon fails as threatened troops open fire on demonstrators. Sensing an opening, North Korea, having previously watched and slightly influence the chaos, prepares to invade. On June 22, 1987, North Korean forces launch a massive artillery barrage followed by a ground invasion across the DMZ. With the South Korean forces disorganized by the protests and USFK having previously been confined to their bases, there is little resistance against the North Koreans. Over the next week, ROK and USFK forces are pushed back to a perimeter around the port city of Pusan where they are expected to hold until U.S. reinforcements arrive and can stage an invasion at the port of Incheon in hopes of cutting off the North Korean invaders.

This campaign gets its name from the Pusan Perimeter during the Korean War when UN forces were forced back to a similar position by the North Koreans following their June 25th invasion. It also features a more modern version of the Incheon Landings.

Bear vs Dragon (People's Republic of China)

The year is 1979. In the aftermath of the signing of a mutual defense treaty between Vietnam and the Soviet Union and Vietnam's subsequent Invasion of Cambodia, Chinese and Soviet relations worsen. The situation continues to deteriorate as Deng Xiaoping meets with Jimmy Carter and China allows the Sino-Soviet Treaty of Friendship, Alliance and Mutual Assistance to expire. China then invades Vietnam and warns the Soviets not to interfere. The Soviets ignore this and send warships and naval troops to the waters around Vietnam. With the war going poorly in Vietnam, the Chinese believe that the Soviets will use this opportunity to attack it. China then attacks the Russian Far East with the goal of seizing and destroying the main Soviet supply base at Vladivostok.

The title of this campaign is a reference to novel The Bear and the Dragon by American author Tom Clancy. The campaign is also a reference to the Sino-Soviet border conflict of the late 1960s, though these did not escalate as badly as the scenario in-game. This is the only REDFOR versus REDFOR campaign in the game. In addition to controlling PLA units, the player also has access to some North Korean troops that the country sends to aid China.

Pearl of the Orient (UK and Commonwealth nations)

The year is 1984. For the past two years, Margret Thatcher's cabinet has been negotiating with the Chinese government on the possibility of the British being able to extend the lease to Hong Kong. Eventually, the talks stall and Deng Xiaoping leaves the negotiations after making the remark that he "could walk in and take the whole lot this afternoon." Thatcher, still fresh off of Britain's victory in the Falklands War, does not back down and reinforces Hong Kong's garrison, as well as gather support from several Commonwealth nations to support Britain's position on the issue. On April 19, 1984, seeing no hope in diplomacy, China declares war on Great Britain in hopes of settling the issue of Hong Kong by force.

Climb Mount Narodnaya (Soviet Union)

The year is 1984. In the aftermath of World War II, the relation between Japan and the Soviet Union is strained due to the Soviet Union's continued occupation of the Kuril Islands. In the late 1970s and early 1980s, the Soviets increase their troop presence on the Kuril Islands to which Japan responds with hardening its stance towards the Soviet Union and increasing military spending. In 1982, Japan allows the U.S. to station F-16s on the Home Islands, to which the Soviets responds by transferring SS-20 missiles to the Russian Far East. The following year Yasuhiro Nakasone declares that he will turn Japan into an unsinkable aircraft carrier, to which the Soviets reply that due to modern technology, such a thing does not exist. When the U.S.-Japanese naval exercise, FleetEx 85, comes within 500 nautical miles of Vladivostok, the Soviet Fleet are put on high alert. Even after the exercise ends, the Soviets still believe it was a rehearsal for an actual attack and decides to conduct a preemptive strike on Japan and the U.S. naval bases there. On December 6, 1984, the coded message "Climb Mount Narodnaya" is transmitted, signaling the invasion of Japan.

The title to this campaign is a reference to "Climb Mount Niitaka", the code phrase confirming the Kido Butai was to strike at Pearl Harbor in December 1941.

Second Korean War (U.S., South Korea, and UN relief forces)

The year is 1992. The Berlin Wall has fallen, and the Cold War has ended. However, concerned about the imminent dissolution of the Soviet Union, hardliners state a coup and arrest Gorbachev, Yeltsin, and several others. While the new junta cannot stop the Warsaw Pact from slipping away, they do violently reoccupy naval bases in the Baltic. Alone in Europe, the USSR turns to its last communist allies in China and North Korea, agreeing to secretly transfer advanced military equipment to both countries. The UN does not fail to notice the military buildup and the United Nations Command places ROK and U.S. troops on the DMZ on high alert, while the U.S. dispatches the Enterprise Carrier Strike Group to the region. However, as the Enterprise is approaching the Korean Peninsula, it is rocked by an unknown explosion, rendering her motionless as a Soviet naval squadron sails in her direction. At the same time, the DMZ erupts in fires from thousands of artillery shells, triggering the Second Korean War.

In this campaign, the player is able to control units from all the available BLUFOR nations (United States, United Kingdom, France, West Germany, Canada, South Korea, Japan, and ANZAC). In addition, during the course of campaign, the player is also required to capture Qingdao and Chongjin in order to stop China and Soviet Union respectively to reinforce the North Korean position.

== Downloadable content ==
The game features both free and paid downloadable content (DLC). The first three free DLCs add a number of multiplayer maps as well as units to existing factions, while the paid DLC adds entirely new playable nations.

The first three DLCs were released in 2016. The first DLC released in May features Armed Forces of the Netherlands as a playable faction to the game. Dutch vehicles such as the DAF YP-408 and the DAF YP-104, as well as a mix of British, French, German and American units are licensed for Dutch use. Another DLC released in June features Israeli Defense Forces to the game. Israeli Army equipment, most notably the Merkava series of tanks, are available in game, alongside many other Israeli units. The third DLC called Double Nation Pack: REDS introduces Yugoslavia and Finland into the game as USSR allies. This DLC includes 186 new units and was released on December 1.

The fourth DLC released in September 2021 adds South African Defence Force faction to the game, with 90 SADF units, 20 brand-new vehicle models, and several new variants.

A fifth DLC was announced on the 26th of July 2024 announcing the addition of Italy to the game in the near future, promising new units including the C1 Ariete MBT and A11 attack aircraft, after it came 4th in the nations vote. The fifth DLC Nation Pack Italy finally released in 29th of August 2024.

== Reception ==
Reception

Aggregate score
Aggregator	Score
Metacritic	78/100

Review scores
Publication	Score
Eurogamer	7/10
IGN	7.6/10
PCGamesN	7/10

According to review aggregator Metacritic, Wargame: Red Dragon received generally favourable reviews after its release. IGN praised the game's graphics and audio, saying it "looks and sounds positively glorious", but criticises the game's naval simulations as "deeply silly" and asserts "the enemy AI does let down its side a little bit", ultimately summarising it as "a good game in a great series".

== See also ==
- List of PC exclusive titles
- Wargame: European Escalation
- Wargame: AirLand Battle
- Command: Modern Air/Naval Operations
