= Wargame: European Escalation =

2012 video game

- Developer(s): Eugen Systems
- Publisher(s): Focus Home Interactive
- Engine: IrisZoom v2
- Platform(s): Windows, OS X, Linux
- Release: Windows; February 23, 2012; OS X; January 17, 2013; Linux; February 28, 2013
- Genre(s): Real-time tactics
- Mode(s): Single-player, multiplayer

Wargame: European Escalation is a real-time tactics video game developed by Eugen Systems and published by Focus Home Interactive, released on February 23, 2012. It is set in Europe during the Cold War, most specifically in the years 1975–85 with alternate history scenarios portraying open war between NATO and the Warsaw Pact.

The game was followed by two sequels, Wargame: AirLand Battle and Wargame: Red Dragon in 2013 and 2014 respectively, and a spiritual successor, WARNO, in 2024.

== Gameplay ==
Wargame's playable factions are the Warsaw Pact, which is subdivided into the Soviet Union, Communist Poland, East Germany, and Czechoslovakia; and NATO, which is subdivided into the United States of America, United Kingdom, France, and West Germany. Players can choose various units from the four subfactions of the side they are playing on, unlocking new units or improved variants as they progress. In all, there are 361 historical units recreated in Wargame.

Each country has its own arsenal of units, reflecting their military doctrine.

Solo mode is divided into four individual campaigns called "Operations", two for each faction. Each are unrelated and chronicle scenarios based on actual events that came close to triggering open war between the two NATO and Warsaw Pact forces.

== Reception ==
Reception

Aggregate score
Aggregator	Score
Metacritic	81/100

Review score
Publication	Score
GameSpot	8.5/10

Wargame: European Escalation has received generally positive reviews upon release, with a Metacritic score of 81/100.

== Sequels ==
A sequel, Wargame: AirLand Battle, was released in May 2013. Like its predecessor, it is set in the Cold War period of 1975–85 but has a focus on the NATO–Warsaw Pact war in Northern Europe, notably in Scandinavia, along with the addition of the player's own air force.

Wargame: Red Dragon was released in April 2014. Set in the Asian theater of war, it includes units from the 1990s and introduces naval forces.

== See also ==
- List of PC exclusive titles
- Wargame: AirLand Battle
- Wargame: Red Dragon
- Victory! The Battle for Europe
