= Ground Control (video game) =

2000 video game

- Developer: Massive Entertainment
- Publisher: Sierra Studios
- Directors: Martin Walfisz; Mats Grahm
- Producer: Jeff Pobst
- Designers: Henrik Sebring; Martin Walfisz
- Programmer: Dan Andersson
- Artist: Tobias Strömvall
- Writers: Henrik Sebring; Arinn Dembo; Martin Walfisz
- Composer: Ola Strandh
- Platform: Microsoft Windows
- Release: NA: 31 May 2000; EU: 16 June 2000
- Genre: Real-time tactics
- Modes: Single-player, multiplayer

Ground Control is a real-time tactics video game developed by Massive Entertainment and published by Sierra Studios, released for Microsoft Windows in 2000. The game focuses on a conflict between two factions vying for control of a planet and a series of alien artefacts contained on its surface, in which players take the role of an officer for each faction, working to achieve their objectives through using a variety of futuristic style of troops, engaging different tactics that make use of their units, the terrain and careful planning.

An expansion for the game was released later that year, before both it and the game were re-released together as a bundle pack called Ground Control Anthology, the following year. The game itself spawned a sequel titled Ground Control II: Operation Exodus in 2004, which improved upon the game's graphics and game mechanics.

== Gameplay ==
The game features full control over the camera, allowing the player to freely view each mission's battlefield from any angle, from a bird's-eye view to the perspective of one of their units at ground level. Because it is a real-time tactics game, Ground Control does not use the mechanics of resource and economic management as found in some real-time strategy games (such as Command & Conquer), discouraging players from conducting tank rush strategies. Instead, proper use of tactics with the units they have available is necessary in order to complete the objectives set out for them on each mission.

The squad configuration screen

Before starting with a mission, players must first decide on what troops to bring to the battlefield, which are divided up into squads that must be loaded onto orbital dropships available to them so that they can be transported and deployed onto the battlefield once a mission starts (with some exceptions). As reinforcements cannot be called for during a mission, proper troop selection is important for each mission. Each dropship that can be loaded out with troops, up to a maximum of three depending on progress in the single player campaign, can carry a maximum of four squads each, with each squad consisting of units picked from one of four unit categories - vehicles, support, aircraft, and infantry - and of a specific role within the chosen category; one exception to the load out is the Command APC, which must be brought along on each mission, but does not take space away from another squad.

Because each type of unit type has its own strengths and weaknesses, as well as a distinct role, various unit combinations are required in order to achieve success; a player could choose to lead squads of heavy armour to punch through enemy defences, but would need to co-ordinate support from infantry and anti-air to protect them from heavy fire, thus players can determine what role a squad plays by the type of unit they chose for it; a player could tactically choose to use heavy armour to punch a hole through enemy defences, while protecting the units with squads of anti-air support, or use scout units to recon and spot targets for artillery support to strike at. While most units of the game's two factions have similarities in function to their equivalent on the other side, some units have notable differences between them. For example, while the Crayven Corporation has hardier units that rely on heavy armour, traditional ballistics and movement, the Order of the New Dawn's units rely on a hover propulsion system for increased speed and mobility and use energy weaponry that give them more damage potential. In addition, each faction's specialist troops are different to each other; while the Order's Templar Infantry consist of an all-female squadron equipped with powerful anti-tank missile launchers who cannot attack infantry, the Crayven's Jaeger Infantry consist of a four-man squad of snipers useful for scouting.

Along with choosing the right troops for a mission, each unit, except for the Command APC, has a choice of specialised weapons and pieces of equipment to choose from, although only one special weapon and one special piece of equipment can be loaded out on a squad for a mission, with both types having a finite number of uses available. Special weapons range from infantry mortars and anti-tank rockets to improved missiles and tactical nuclear warheads, which can either improve a squad's effectiveness in its specialized role, or allow it to defeat targets which it would otherwise be virtually ineffective against. Meanwhile, special equipment can include medkits, repair kits, image intensifiers, afterburners, various stationary turrets, or, for one faction, repair stations. While most specials can usually be used two or three times by a squad during a mission, most of the powerful special abilities are limited to a single use.

Once troop selection is done and the units are deployed onto the battlefield, careful use of tactics needs to be employed by the player to ensure that they get the most out of the units they are using in a battle. The use of flanking maneuvers is a useful tactic to use, especially when facing against armoured units, which are much weaker to attacks from the sides, rear and from above, rather than a frontal assault. Taking advantage of high ground offers units a more tactical vantage point to strike at the topside weakness of armoured units, while increasing accuracy and sight range of units from such a position, which is a tactical bonus for artillery. Suppressive fire is also simulated by the game, in which units being suppressed will fire less accurately, thus it can be a useful tactic to weaken stronger opponents with; infantry units can effectively suppress heavy units such as tanks, even if the target is not taking any damage due to armor. Stealth can also be used on the battlefield; units can take advantage of shadows cast by higher terrain to camouflage themselves, while infantry can also use foliage to hide, thus scouting ahead to preempt any ambushes is often essential to protecting armoured units. Friendly fire is also taken into account, as units firing behind the front lines can shoot friendlies in their lines of fire, causing them damage, thus careful attention to squad placement is required.

Briefing screen between maps in the campaign

If a player uses wise tactics to preserve their troops, any squads that survive a mission are rewarded with experience upon its completion, which can also include the awarding of medals awarded for a squad's combat performance, granting them with improved abilities that can make them more efficient later on in the campaign. Any losses taken by a squad are replenished at the end of a mission, but if the whole squad is wiped out, they will not be replaced unless the player is playing on easier difficulty levels; if so, the new squad will start inexperienced.

== Plot ==
Following the aftermath of the Third World War (known in the game as "The Sixteen-Minute War") in the 25th century, mankind successfully rebuilds and begins colonization of several planets across the galaxy, while the Earth becomes ruled by the Global Central Command (GCC) - a council of elected representatives, including those from mega corporations that rose to power following the fall of Terran nations. Despite treaties set out by the GCC, conflict between the various powers spearheading colonization occurs daily, often over resources and trade routes. By the time the game begins, two powers assisting in colonization efforts, the Crayven Corporation and a religious sect known as the Order of the New Dawn, begin vying for total control over a distant world known as Krig 7-B.

Today we know only that The Order of the New Dawn was founded by a small coalition of men and women of Faith, who united in common cause during the dark days of the latter 21st century. Foreseeing the coming cataclysm, these early cultists dedicated themselves to preserving as much technology and knowledge as possible, in order to bring about a New Dawn after the inevitable holocaust. Many analysts have observed that without the Sixteen Minutes' War, the Order would have been just another apocalyptic cult.

But the End of the Civilized World did indeed come, and the proto-Order was ready for it - and even the corporations, no matter what they may think of the Order in the present day, do not deny the debt all of humanity owes them. The greatest prize saved by the Order was the Liber Aurorae Novae, the Book of the New Dawn: millions of digitally stored books, recordings, and images, which members of the Order chose to save from the coming holocaust. Of course, critics are quick to point out that this treasure was not saved merely for the benefit of humanity. Since 2177, the works collected in the L.A.N. have been protected under the existing salvage laws of the GCC, and are no longer considered to be "in the Public Domain". Many irreplaceable classics of human art and literature are thus copyrighted to the Church in perpetuity, and every reader of Charles Dickens, William Butler Yeats and Joseph Conrad must pay royalties to the church.

...

...

...

Major Parker's Commando unit was stationed at firebase Zulu on the main continent of Sigma Draconis when it was attacked by the Order of the New Dawn, who had declared the planet sacred ground and filed Jihad against any corporate holding which did not immediately evacuate.

— From Ground Control manual - 47 pages PDF included with the game

Major Sarah Parker, an officer for the Crayven Corporation, is assigned by Enrica Hayes, a director in the company working aboard one of their starships, the CSS Astrid, to lead ground operations on Krig 7-B. During her assignments, Parker fails to rescue a defector from the Order called Bishop Delondre, but receives a data disk from him concerning an Order operation known only as "Project Garm". Later into her operations while protecting an important Crayven facility, her team successfully secure an alien relic called a "Xenofact", which prompts Hayes to order the destruction of Order bases that have secured other Xenofacts. Eventually, after the Order's warship, the WCS Clergy, is driven from the planet's orbit, Crayven forces successfully destroy the Order's last remaining base in the planet's northern polar region, and gain control over a Xenofact far larger than had been seen in their campaign. Satisfied with Parker's efforts, Hayes orders Crayven forces to begin mopping up any Order stragglers left on the planet.

Seeking to prevent the corporation from achieving total victory on Krig 7-B, two officers of the Order, Deacon Jarred Stone and Paladin Magnus, Stone's CO and an old friend, rally surviving troops in order to conduct a series of daring, guerrilla-styled hit and run missions, against high value targets of the Crayven, despite concerns that they fight a losing battle without the assistance of the Clergy. During their strikes, Stone and Magnus recover important data, which details more about Project Garm, providing insight on Delondre's motive for defecting. Magnus soon disappears shortly after Aegeri, a "Great Cardinal" of the Order, arrives on board the WCS Retribution, with much needed reinforcements. While Aegeri questions some of the targets that Magnus chose, he soon directs Stone into continuing his strikes against Crayven forces. During an assault on a Crayven airbase, Magnus contacts Stone for a secret meeting, passing on Delondre's ID code, among other codes, so that he can fully access all of the Project Garm data. After the mission, Stone discovers that both the Order and the Crayven seek control over the planet's Xenofacts.

Usual gameplay

Shortly after a well organized Crayven assault is countered, resulting in the Order securing a Xenofact, Aegeri and Hayes meet and declare a ceasefire, forging an alliance between the two powers and creating a joint task-force aimed at unlocking the secrets of the Xenofacts. Angered and feeling betrayed, Stone reunites with Magnus to stop the alliance gaining full control over the Xenofacts, but their hidden base is soon besieged by a large Crayven force, leading Magnus to sacrificing himself in order for Stone and their troops to be safely extracted by Parker, who had discovered that Aegeri and Hayes had met up weeks before the ceasefire was announced. Working together alongside Magnus' friend Cole, a Crayven operative, they quickly discover that the Xenofacts found on the planet were among many created by an alien civilisation more than a million years ago, as part of an ancient, galaxy-wide fail-safe system designed to counter an invasion, in which each Xenofact contains a powerful war machine within it that can only be activated from Krig 7-B. The group quickly realise that both the Crayven and the Order sought control over the system so as to use it to gain complete control over the galaxy, and that Aegeri and Hayes now plan to carry this out together.

Seeking to stop this, Stone, Parker and Cole launch a desperate assault on the huge Xenofact, killing Aegeri while successfully destroying the artifact with DXT charges, which destroys the Retribution and sends both Hayes and the Astrid elsewhere in the system. While Parker, Cole and Stone celebrate their victory and saving millions of lives while trying to figure out how to leave Krig 7-B, Hayes contacts her boss in the Crayven Corporation and reports her failure at utilizing the Xenofacts, to which her employer remarks that there are still other ways to win control of the galaxy, as the Astrid drifts through space.

== Reception ==
Reception

Aggregate score
Aggregator	Score
Metacritic	86/100

Review scores
Publication	Score
AllGame	4/5
CNET Gamecenter	9/10
Computer Games Strategy Plus	4.5/5
Computer Gaming World	4/5
Eurogamer	9/10
GamePro	4.5/5
GameRevolution	A−
GameSpot	8.5/10
GameSpy	90%
GameZone	8/10
IGN	8.6/10
Next Generation	3/5
PC Gamer (US)	85%

The game received "generally favorable reviews" according to the review aggregation website Metacritic. Jim Preston of NextGen was positive to its gameplay and graphics, and called the game "gorgeous", "intuitive", and "simple".

The staff of Computer Games Magazine nominated it for their 2000 "Real-time Strategy Game of the Year" award, whose winner remains unknown. It was a runner-up for GameSpy's "2000 Strategy Game of the Year" award, which ultimately went to The Sims. The staff wrote: "Great graphics, great sound, and great multiplayer -- what's not to like?" The game was nominated for the "Best Graphics, Technical" and "Strategy Game of the Year" awards at GameSpot's Best and Worst of 2000 Awards, both of which went to Giants: Citizen Kabuto and Shogun: Total War. It was also nominated for the RTS Game of the Year award at the CNET Gamecenter Computer Game Awards for 2000, which went to Sacrifice. The Wargamer named it as the best real-time tactical game of 2000.

In 2003, writer Mark H. Walker reported that the game "didn't sell". He placed its sales at "a few tens of thousands of copies".

== Legacy ==
Following its release in 2000, Sierra announced in August of that same year, that an expansion pack called Ground Control: Dark Conspiracy, was being developed by both Massive Entertainment and High Voltage Software, which was released a few months later in October. The expansion continued the original storyline by focusing on Sarah Parker in the aftermath of the conflict, introducing a brand new campaign of 15 new missions and a new faction called the Phoenix Mercenaries who came with unique units and specialised in using incendiary-based weaponry and abilities. In addition, it also included some new units to existing factions, additional terrain types, new multiplayer maps, and fully rendered cutscenes that didn't use the in-game engine. The following year, both the expansion and the main game were bundled together in a pack, entitled Ground Control Anthology.

In 2004, a sequel titled Ground Control II: Operation Exodus was developed by Massive and released by Vivendi. While the sequel featured improvements and updates to the game's graphical engine and story, it also brought about faster-paced game mechanics that were more in line with contemporary real-time strategy games. In addition, a new game mechanic was introduced in the form of an economy system tied which gave players points to spend on fielding new unit and calling in support weapons for one of the game's factions, when destroying enemies and gaining control of control points, another game mechanic that was also introduced. Prior to its release, Vivendi released Ground Control to the public as freeware, as a promotion for the sequel's release.

In 2008, Vivendi retained ownership of the Ground Control franchise, shortly after its merger with Activision Blizzard led to Massive Entertainment being sold to Ubisoft in November, until July 2009 when they sold the franchise over to Rebellion Developments who revealed the plans to release a new game for the series, although no official news since then has confirmed that a sequel is being developed.

In 2009, both Ground Control Anthology and Ground Control II were re-released by the digital distributor GOG.com, while Rebellion re-released both titles onto Steam in 2015.

In 2017, an unofficial second expansion developed by the player community was released called Ground Control: The Aftermath, which picks up where Ground Control: Dark Conspiracy left off. It bridges the gap in the story between Ground Control: Dark Conspiracy and Ground Control II: Operation Exodus, featuring 18 new missions. Despite being an unofficial mod, The Aftermath provides a quality of gameplay similar to that of the official releases with its storyline, mission design, voice dialogue, and overall atmosphere.
