= Captain Blood (2025 video game) =

2025 video game

- Developers: SeaWolf Studio; General Arcade
- Publisher: SNEG
- Platforms: Windows; macOS; Nintendo Switch; PlayStation 4; PlayStation 5; Xbox One; Xbox Series X/S
- Release: 6 May 2025
- Genres: Action-adventure, hack and slash
- Mode: Single-player

Captain Blood, formerly known as Age of Pirates: Captain Blood (Russian: Приключения капитана Блада, romanized: Priklyucheniya kapitana Blada, lit. 'The Adventures of Captain Blood'), is a 2025 action-adventure game developed by SeaWolf Studio and published by SNEG. It is based on the novel of the same name by Rafael Sabatini about the titular Captain Blood. The player assumes the role of the Captain, following his adventures in 1685 Spanish Main.

The game is notable for being in development hell for 10 years before being abandoned due to legal issues. Captain Blood had been rated by the PEGI rating board and was to be released by 1C before a lawsuit resulted in the project being shelved and considered vaporware. A J2ME version was released in Russia in 2006.

A re-reveal of the game was announced in June 2024, and was released on May 6, 2025 for Microsoft Windows, macOS, PlayStation 4, PlayStation 5, Xbox One, Xbox Series X/S and Nintendo Switch.

== Gameplay ==
Captain Blood is a pirate-themed hack and slash action game that featured a mission-based structure, allowing players to fight on both land and sea against hordes of enemies, with ship-to-ship battles and sword fights to gain control of invaded ships. Players gain special points as they defeat enemies, acquiring new fighting techniques and gold for weapons and equipment.

== Development and release ==
In 2003, it was announced that Akella, developer of Sea Dogs and Pirates of the Caribbean, would make a game based on the Sabatini novels. Development on the game was restarted at the end of the year when new project leads took over. The game was featured at E3 2004 as part of publisher 1C Company's lineup of titles. However, by the end of the year, the project was restarted again, taking on a more mature tone. The development team was split into a SeaDogs team (Age of Pirates: Caribbean Tales) and a SeaWolf team (Captain Blood).

Playlogic Entertainment signed on in 2005 to be the game's publisher in Europe and the United States, and development was once again restarted in 2006. By 2008, Akella sold its internal SeaWolves team to Russian publisher 1C following a legal battle with Playlogic over rights to the series; development was then further delayed. The game was set to be released in 2006 on Microsoft Windows and Xbox, but was subsequently moved to the Xbox 360. In June 2008, a trailer was released and media outlets were able to play the game. A website launched in July 2010. Around the same time, Playlogic declared bankruptcy and underwent restructuring, effectively canceling the game in all but name.

In 2020, Akella alumnus Oleg Klapovskiy and 1C Company alumnus Artem Shchuiko founded SNEG in London. After being acquainted during previous stints developing for GOG.com, they decided to come forward to negotiate a revival of the game and obtain the rights to the game from its owners. Actual development was outsourced to Malaysia-based General Arcade due to their experience and enthusiasm working with custom engines.

After 10 years of inactivity, the full 1.0 version of the game was leaked online and made available on torrent sites. Source code of the game engine was released on GitHub under GPLv3 on November 28, 2022.

On 17 June 2024, a new trailer for the game was released. It was later announced that the game would be delayed into 2025 to allow for more development time, but a new release date was revealed in January. Captain Blood would later be released on May 6, 2025 for Windows, macOS, PlayStation 4, PlayStation 5, Xbox One, Xbox Series X/S and Nintendo Switch.

== Reception ==
Reception

Aggregate scores
Aggregator	Score
Metacritic	(PC) 50/100 (PS5) 49/100
OpenCritic	12% recommend

According to the review aggregation website Metacritic, the PC version of Captain Blood received "mixed or average" reviews from critics, while the PlayStation 5 version received generally unfavorable reviews from critics. Fellow review aggregator OpenCritic assessed that the game received weak approval, being recommended by 12% of critics.
