= Joel Breton =

Video game producer and filmmaker

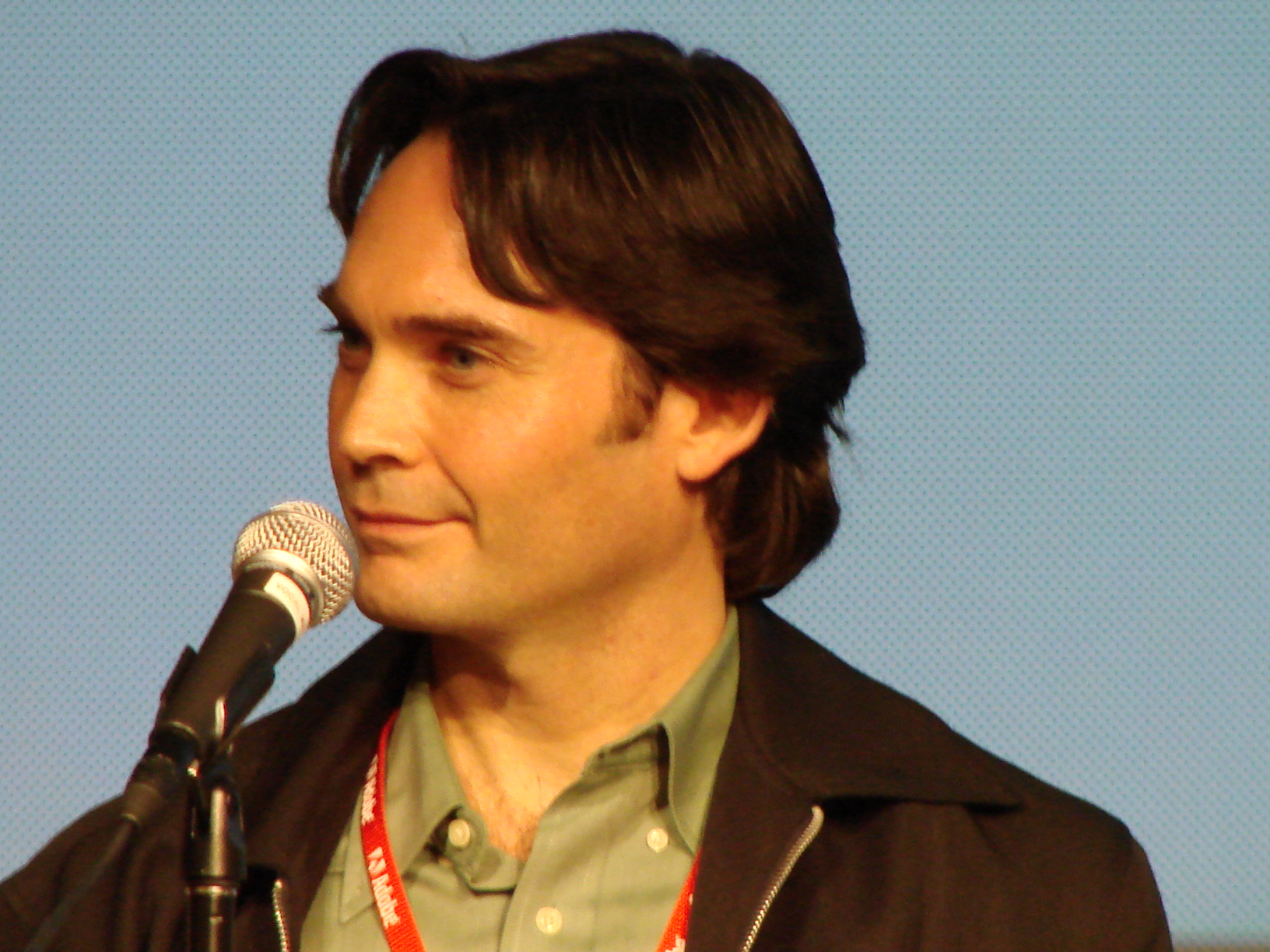
- Joel Breton speaking at Game Developers Conference
- Occupations: Video game producer, Video game designer, Film producer, Entrepreneur

Joel Breton is an American video game producer, video game designer, film producer and entrepreneur. He has worked as a producer on multiple award-winning video games, including Unreal PC, Bomberman Live, and Pirates of the Caribbean. In 2016, Breton became the head of virtual reality content for HTC Vive, where he manages both internal and external content development for the HTC Vive virtual reality platform. In October 2018, Breton premiered the world's first feature length VR film, 7 Miracles, at the Raindance Film Festival, where it won the VR Film of the Festival award. Joel Breton is a member of the Steering Committee for the Academy of International Extended Reality (AIXR), where he works to advance AR/VR technology in the global marketplace.

Breton is a video game industry veteran who began his career in 1994 when he landed a role at Sega of America in Product Development. Since then, he has produced, designed and created more than 250 video games across 22 console platforms. He has also created more than 100 online games that have been played more than a billion times across the web.

Joel's first role as a video game producer was for GT Interactive, where he produced Duke Nukem: Land of the Babes, Unreal, Blood 2, Anno 1602, Baseball mogul, Deer Hunter, along with several other video games. While at GT, Breton successfully green-lit and launched the development cycle for No One Lives Forever.

Breton produced several games for Bethesda Softworks, a game publisher based in Bethesda, Maryland. He worked as a producer on Sea Dogs, Echelon, and IHRA Drag Racing, while serving as Producer and Studio Head of Bethesda West Studios in Olympia, Washington.

Joel then moved to Moscow, Russia, to create and manage Bethesda's European development operations. While stationed in Moscow, he worked as a producer on Pirates of the Caribbean for the Xbox which was the first U.S. console game developed in Russia.

Breton founded the game development company Kozmo Games to develop casual games for the global market. Kozmo Games has since developed and released Ice Cream Tycoon and War Chess for the casual game market.

Breton returned to California in 2005 where he joined Take Two Interactive and worked as a producer on World Poker Tour for the PS2, PlayStation Portable, Xbox, and Game Boy Advance platforms. He also worked as a producer on Amped 3, a launch title for the Xbox 360. He led the Major League Baseball 2K6 team and produced the PlayStation Portable version of the exclusive Major League Baseball game which was released in Spring of 2006.

Joel next appeared as a Senior Producer with Hudson Entertainment in 2006 and produced Bomberman Live among several other console titles for the U.S. division of Hudson Soft.

From 2007 until 2010 Joel held the position of Director of Content for AddictingGames.com, MTV Network's leading website with more than 30 million monthly visitors. During that time he established the site as an original game IP factory, creating and launching more than 100 original game franchises and publishing more than 800 new games on the site.

Joel is a frequent speaker at game industry conventions and he represented MTV Networks and AddictingGames by speaking at the Casual Connect conference in Kiev in 2008. Joel was a speaker and on the steering committee for the Flash Gaming Summit in 2009, at Casual Connect Seattle 2010.

Breton also pioneered the production of viral news games and he designed and created more than 10 viral news games that were each played millions of times. Hero On The Hudson was one of the first viral news games he launched, celebrating the heroism of Captain Sully Sullenberger's perfect plane landing on the Hudson River. Oiligarchy, was another viral news game which examined the oil industry for the first time in a video game. Joel and his team at AddictingGames also produced Where's the Naughty Governor, a news game that was highlighted by the LA Times in the article "Web games, ripped from the healdines".

In August 2010, Joel was appointed Executive Vice President of North America for Zattikka Ltd., a social game company focused on the high growth platforms of social, mobile and online games.

From 2012 to 2015, Joel moved to the global video game publisher, 505 Games, where he served as Senior Vice President of Product Development. During his time as head of 505 Games' product development division, the company launched a string of highly rated and successful games, including Payday 2, Terraria, Brothers: A Tale of Two Sons, How To Survive, Gems of War, and Battle Islands.

In January 2016, Breton was appointed Vice President of Virtual Reality Content at HTC Vive, where he and the HTC Vive content team are responsible for creating virtual reality content across ten categories, including healthcare, education, cinematic/live video, gaming, design, real-estate, retail, media, social, & theme-park experiences. Joel believes that game players are going to be blown away by the full immersion that they can experience in virtual reality games on the HTC Vive platform.

== Biography ==
=== Sega of America ===
Joel began his video game career at Sega in 1994 where he worked in the Product Development division on many of SEGA’s games including Virtua Fighter, and World Series Baseball. During his time at Sega, Joel worked on games that were published across seven console platforms including – Genesis, CD, Game Gear, 32X, Pico, Saturn, and Nomad.

=== Headgames Inc. ===
Breton then joined Headgames, a game development company in San Francisco where he worked as a designer on Killwheel and Sirens for the PC and PlayStation platforms.

=== GT Interactive ===
In 1997, Joel moved to GT Interactive and began producing front-line games for the powerhouse PC game publisher. He worked as a producer on several first-person shooting (FPS) games during his three years at GT Interactive including, Duke Nukem: Land of the Babes, and Blood 2. During his time at GT Interactive, Breton also produced Anno 1602, Baseball Mogul, and Deer Hunter.

=== Bethesda Softworks ===
Breton was hired as Game Producer and later promoted to Studio Head for Bethesda Softworks in Olympia, Washington. Joel then moved to Russia to establish Bethesda Softworks East in the heart of Moscow. While stationed in Russia he first established relations with the leading Russian game development studios and signed contracts with the top teams to develop AAA games for Bethesda Softworks to publish globally. During his 3 years in Russia, Breton produced Pirates of the Caribbean (video game) on the Xbox - the first U.S. console game developed in Russia.

=== Kozmo Games ===
Breton founded the game development company Kozmo Games in 2004, to develop casual games for the global market. Kozmo Games developed and released Ice Cream Tycoon and War Chess for the casual game market.

=== Take-Two Interactive ===
In 2005, Breton joined Take Two Interactive where he was the External Producer for 2K Sports. During his time there he produced World Poker Tour, Major League Baseball 2k6, and Amped 3 which was an Xbox 360 launch title.

=== Hudson Entertainment ===
Joel then joined Hudson Entertainment, the US division of Hudson Soft, the storied Japanese game publisher. While at Hudson he focused on creating the highest rated version of Bomberman for the Xbox 360 and PlayStation 3 console platforms. Joel worked closely with the North American development team and the Japanese Hudson Soft team to create Bomberman Live—the highest rated and top selling version of Bomberman released in the US market. He also produced several other console and mobile games while at Hudson Entertainment, including Bonk's Adventure, Diner Dash, and Military Madness.

=== AddictingGames.com /MTV Networks ===
In 2007, Breton joined MTV Networks as Director of Content for AddictingGames.com, and helped to grow the site to become the number one game site in the U.S. in terms of unique monthly visitors. During his three years at AddictingGames, he was responsible for the development and release of more than one hundred games that have been played billions of times at AddictingGames and around the web. Breton was also in charge of creating new IP and game franchises for AddictingGames. He worked with development teams to create many of the top online game franchises including—Sniper Assassin, The Heist, Bad Boys, Moto Rush, and Stick Hero. While at AddictingGames, he was responsible for the site's game development, licensing, sponsorship, publishing, and promotion. Breton was also responsible for licensing hit game franchises to be published across platforms including online, social networks, iPhone, iPod, iPad, Android, and other mobile platforms.

== Games ==
- Ready Player One: Oasis Beta (2018), Vive Studios
- Knockout League (2017), Vive Studios
- Super Puzzle Galaxy (2017), Vive Studios
- TrueScale (2017), Vive Studios
- Amazon Odyssey (2017), Vive Studios
- Virtual Sports (2016), Vive Studios
- Arcade Saga (2016), Vive Studios
- Chef Emma (2015), 505 Games
- Fashion Week Live (2013), 505 Games
- Wicked: The Game (2014), 505 Games
- Gems of War (2014), 505 Games
- Battle Islands (2013), 505 Games
- Sniper Elite III (2014), 505 Games
- Brothers: A Tale of Two Sons (2013),505 Games
- How To Survive (2013), 505 Games
- Terraria (2014), 505 Games
- Payday 2 (2013), 505 Games
- MotoRush World (2010), MTV Networks
- Stick Hero (2010), MTV Networks
- Sniper Assassin (2010), MTV Networks
- Oiligarchy (2009), MTV Networks
- Mix Master (2009), MTV Networks
- The Heist (2008), MTV Networks
- Bomberman Live (2007), Hudson Entertainment
- Amped 3 (2005), 2K Sports
- World Poker Tour (2006), 2K Sports
- Major League Baseball 2k6 (2006), 2K Sports
- Pirates of the Caribbean (video game) (2003), Bethesda Softworks
- Sea Dogs (video game) (2000), Bethesda Softworks
- Echelon (2001), Bethesda Softworks
- IHRA Drag Racing (2000), Bethesda Softworks
- Duke Nukem: Land of the Babes (2000), GT Interactive
- Unreal (1998), GT Interactive
- Anno 1602 (1998), GT Interactive
- Blood II: The Nightmares (1999), GT Interactive
- Baseball Mogul (1999), GT Interactive
- Duke Nukem Forever (1998), GT Interactive
- Sonic & Knuckles (1994), Sega
- Doom 32X (1994), Sega
- Virtua Fighter (1995), Sega
- X-men 2: Clone Wars (1995), Sega
- Daytona USA (1995), Sega
- Shining Force II (1995), Sega
- Nightmare Circus (1996), Sega
- The Adventures of Batman & Robin (video game) (1995), Sega
- Wacky Worlds Creativity Studio (1994), Sega
