= Alfonso Vallés =

Spanish voice actor

- Born: 24 October 1960 (age 65); Barcelona, Spain
- Occupation: Voice actor
- Years active: 1986–present

Alfonso Vallés (born 24 October 1960) is a Spanish voice actor known for his role as Solid Snake in Metal Gear Solid, Surf's Up, CSI, Pirates of the Caribbean, Doom, Final Fantasy, and Advent Children. He is considered one of the best Spanish voice actors of all time. He also dubbed Al Bundy in Married... with Children, Djimon Hounsou in Blood Diamond, and The Mist, an adaptation of the novel of Stephen King.

== Roles ==
=== Video games ===
- Aliens: Colonial Marines (Keyes)
- The Incredible Hulk (Jupiter Leader)
- Iron Man (Tony Stark / Iron Man)
- Left 4 Dead 2 (Coach)
- Metal Gear Solid (Solid Snake)
- Professor Layton vs. Phoenix Wright: Ace Attorney (Judge)
- Sonic Generations (Vector the Crocodile)
- Star Fox 64 3D (General Pepper, Andross, Wolf O'Donnell)
- Star Wars: The Clone Wars – Republic Heroes (Cad Bane)
- Vanquish (Lt. Col. Robert Burns)

== Bibliography ==
- García Navarro, Luís (5 November 2007). "Alfonso Vallés, el legendario Solid Sanke". MeriStation (in Spanish). p. 2.
