= Age of Pirates 2: City of Abandoned Ships =

2009 video game

- Developer: Akella
- Publisher: Playlogic
- Series: Age of Pirates
- Engine: Storm Engine 2.8
- Platform: Microsoft Windows
- Release: NA: May 26, 2009
- Genre: Role-playing
- Mode: Single-player

Age of Pirates 2: City of Abandoned Ships (Russian: Корсары: Город потерянных кораблей, literally "Corsairs: City of Lost Ships") is a role-playing video game developed by Akella and released for Windows on May 26, 2009. It is the sequel to Sea Dogs (2000), Pirates of the Caribbean (2003), and Age of Pirates: Caribbean Tales (2006). Like Caribbean Tales, it does not boast either of the two former games' names, for legal reasons.

The game was followed by Sea Dogs: To Each His Own in 2012. In 2017, Age of Pirates 2 was re-released on GOG and Steam as Sea Dogs: City of Abandoned Ships.

== Plot ==
The game's plot is rather open-ended. At the start, the player may begin alone or choose one of four navies: England, Spain, France and the Netherlands. The player then embarks on several quests, of which some are mandatory.

The English campaign is based loosely in part on Rafael Sabatini's Captain Blood novel's first twelve chapters, as the main campaign character name, description, the events he is involved in and the characters resemble with the ones described in Sabatini's novel.

== Gameplay ==
Age of Pirates 2 is a role-playing game. It retains many of the gameplay features from the previous games, such as the ability to trade, fight, battle and board other ships, explore, and sail in real-time. The latter feature is not compulsory; a player may choose to sail around using the map. There is a new, faster fight system, and a more complex trading system. There are three different characters the player can choose from. Each one has a separate storyline and class. As with the previous games, there are many swords and guns within the game, each with their own attributes.

The player must develop seven main attributes in order to succeed. This is the "new PIRATES role playing system", and the first letter of each attribute comes together to spell PIRATES.

As with the previous titles, there are many real ship types from the period to choose from. A player may have more than one ship, or in some cases, none at all. The better ships will, of course, cost more money. Some ships can't be bought and must be captured at sea. Some ships are available only after completion of certain quests.

During quests, the player can get the warship Flying Dutchman and the man-of-war Soleil Royal. Queen Anne's Revenge is seen in some ports, but is not controlled by Blackbeard, who was not yet a famous pirate in the game's 17th century setting.

== Reception ==
Reception

Aggregate score
Aggregator	Score
Metacritic	61/100

Review scores
Publication	Score
GameStar	54%
GameZone	6.5/10
IGN	5.7/10
PopMatters	4/10
Svet Kompjutera	68%

Upon its release, Age of Pirates 2 was met with "mixed or average" reviews from critics, with an aggregate score of 61% on Metacritic.
