= Xyanide: Resurrection =

2007 video game

- Developer(s): Playlogic Game Factory
- Publisher(s): Playlogic International
- Platform(s): PlayStation 2, PlayStation Portable, Windows
- Release: PSP: EU: August 31, 2007; JP: December 27, 2007; PS2: EU: July 31, 2007; JP: January 21, 2008; Windows: EU: September 4, 2008
- Genre(s): Shoot 'em up
- Mode(s): Single-player, multiplayer

Xyanide Resurrection is a shoot 'em up video game developed by Playlogic Game Factory and published by Playlogic International for Microsoft Windows, PlayStation 2, and PlayStation Portable in 2007–2008 in Europe and Japan. It is a sequel to 2006's Xyanide.

== Plot ==
Xyanide Resurrection takes place after the events of the first Xyanide, as the space witch Aguira is still alive and the protagonist Drake fights to hunt her down in alternate dimension who she has escaped to.

== Reception ==
The game received generally poor or average reviews.
