= Xyanide =

2006 video game

- Cover of the unreleased PAL Version
- Developer: Playlogic Entertainment
- Publisher: Evolved Games
- Artist: Jack Hageraats
- Engine: RenderWare
- Platform: Xbox
- Release: NA: August 15, 2006
- Genre: Shoot 'em up
- Modes: Single-player, multiplayer

Xyanide is a video game developed by Playlogic Entertainment and published by Evolved Games for the Xbox in 2006. Described as an "innovative amalgam of 2D shooting and modern 3D effects", Xyanide is a 3D interpretation of the 2D side-scrolling shoot 'em up genre. The game was developed in line with a series of unreleased titles for the Game Boy Advance by Engine Software and Nokia N-Gage by Overloaded Pocket Media, with a mobile version of the game being released in 2005. Xyanide was released in 2006 as the final exclusive title to be released for the Xbox. A PAL version was planned to release but got cancelled. Despite this the game features different languages, including German and France and is region free. A sequel of the game, Xyanide: Resurrection, released by Playlogic in 2007 for the PlayStation 2, PlayStation Portable and PC.

== Gameplay ==
A screenshot of gameplay in Xyanide.

Xyanide is a shoot 'em up game in which players navigate six 3D levels that alternate between side-scrolling and three-dimensional perspectives and feature branching paths. Players control their ship using a two-stick control scheme, with the left stick controlling movement and the right stick controlling the aim of weapons. Core weapons include a spread gun for smaller ships, a laser for larger enemies, and an auxiliary missile launcher that can lock onto targets. The player's ship and weapons can transform during stages by collecting one of two branches of 'mutator' upgrades, with players able to switch between mutations during gameplay. 'Mech' upgrades enhance the player's laser, and 'Organic' upgrades enhance the player's spread gun, with each providing a range of additional unique abilities. Player performance in levels is ranked with a scoring system, with points accumulated by killing enemies, as well as bonus points earned from acquiring abilities, with scores able to be uploaded to Xbox Live. The game features multiplayer gameplay using local co-op using a second controller. While Xbox Live was shut down on April 15, 2010. Xyanide is supported online with replacement online servers for the Xbox called Insignia.

== Plot ==
An intergalactic witch named Aguira has been captured and sentenced to death for her dreadful crimes, but a spaceship transporting Aguira to her execution was struck by an asteroid. To her surprise, the asteroid was rich in Xyanide, a mythical substance known for its abilities to make an exposed person's thoughts become reality. Taking advantage of the situation, the witch uses her new powers to create her own alternate universe as a tool to aid her escape and spread her destructive influence. It is up to the escort pilot Drake to try and stop the evil Aguira from accomplishing her goals and to carry out the sentence.

== Development ==
Xyanide was announced by Dutch developer Playlogic Entertainment in June 2003 and developed at the Game Factory, an in-house studio based in Breda. It was planned to release the game first in Q4 2003. The game was showcased by Playlogic International at E3 in May 2004. In September 2005, development of Xyanide was completed with the game entering a beta testing phase. Ports of Xyanide were also planned by Playlogic for handheld consoles and mobile. Xyanide Advance, a port for the Game Boy Advance developed by Engine Software following their acquisition by Playlogic, was an unreleased title planned for release in Europe in 2004, with an advance release trailer of gameplay released in January 2004. A port of the game for mobile and the Nokia N-Gage by Overloaded Pocket Media was also developed, with a demo of the game being released in February 2005. The design of the ports aimed to prioritise the "look and feel of the original Xbox title, using similar assets compressed to the resolution of portable devices. The mobile port of the game was released in 2005.

== Reception ==
Reception

Aggregate score
Aggregator	Score
Metacritic	70/100

Review scores
Publication	Score
GameSpot	8.1/10
GamesRadar+	3/5
GameZone	7.7/10
IGN	6.3/10
Official Xbox Magazine (US)	7/10
Play	9.0
TeamXbox	7/10
X-Play	2/5
Gaming Target	6.9

Xyanide received lukewarm reviews from critics, with review aggregation website Metacritic recording "mixed or average reviews" for the game at an average score of 70% across 16 reviews. Reviewers were mixed on the game's graphics, with positive reviews praising its unique tone and visual presentation. Writing for Play, Dave Halverson praised the tone of the game as "exquisite", praising the "hypnotic" opening cutscene and "eerily serene" effects "as if a cinematographer crafted the voyage." Play subsequently awarded the game as the "best traditional shooter" of 2006, stating the game's "esoteric sci-fi air" and "surreal settings" made Xyanide a "unique experience". However, whilst Greg Kasavin of GameSpot praised the "trippy presentation" of the game, he noted it was "somewhat bewildering" and "prone to some unsightly drops in the frame rate." Similarly, Erik Brudvig of IGN critiqued the game's graphics, stating "the levels look pretty at first, but quickly become nauseating and boring when the same backgrounds continuously scroll by awkwardly."

Reviewers were similarly mixed on the accessibility of the game's control scheme and handling. Zak Downing of Gaming Target described Xyanide as a "very well controlled game", praising the handling as "smooth and engaging", although critiquing the "constantly moving" and "irregular" camera movement. Erik Brudvig of IGN noted that controlling the player's ship was "simple and intuitive", but noted "you won't always be able to shoot the target you're trying to aim for", remarking "the targeting is spotty" and "the aiming system (is) awkward". Writing for GameSpot, Greg Kasavin stated the game was "relatively hard to get into", citing the lack of guidance from the user interface and the "unclear" differentiation of weapons, although finding the difficulty level for the game appropriate. Douglas Trueman of GamesRadar expressed frustration with the targeting, stating "since the game automatically targets enemies on all three axes, players will occasionally find themselves firing into the distance while enemies...swarm in for the kill."
