= Alpha Black Zero: Intrepid Protocol =

2004 tactical shooter video game

Alpha Black Zero
- Developer: Khaeon
- Publisher: Playlogic
- Platform: Windows
- Release: UK: July 30, 2004; NA: September 3, 2004
- Genre: Tactical shooter
- Modes: Single-player, multiplayer

Alpha Black Zero: Intrepid Protocol is a 2004 team-based tactical shooter video game for Microsoft Windows developed by Khaeon and published by Playlogic Entertainment.

== Gameplay ==
The player is tasked with various missions in a third-person shooter, where the player takes control of one of five special ops team members with different specializations.

== Reception ==
The game holds a "mixed or average" review score of 51 based on 18 critic reviews on the review aggregate Metacritic.
