= Demarcation line =

Geopolitical border, often agreed upon as part of an armistice or ceasefire

A political demarcation line is a geopolitical border, often agreed upon as part of an armistice or ceasefire.

== Africa ==
- Moroccan Wall, delimiting the Moroccan-controlled part of Western Sahara from the Sahrawi-controlled part

== Americas ==
- During European imperialism overseas, the lines of amity were drawn to differentiate Europe from the rest of the world. The Line of Demarcation was one specific line drawn along a meridian in the Atlantic Ocean as part of the Treaty of Tordesillas in 1494 to divide new lands claimed by Portugal from those of Spain. This line was drawn in 1493 after Christopher Columbus returned from his maiden voyage to the Americas.
- The Mason–Dixon line (or "Mason and Dixon's Line") is a demarcation line between four U.S. states, forming part of the borders of Pennsylvania, Maryland, Delaware, and West Virginia (then part of Virginia). It was surveyed between 1763 and 1767 by Charles Mason and Jeremiah Dixon in the resolution of a border dispute between British colonies in Colonial America.

== Asia ==
=== Middle East ===
- The Blue Line is a border demarcation between Lebanon and Israel published by the United Nations on 7 June 2000 for the purposes of determining whether Israel had fully withdrawn from Lebanon.
- The term Green Line is used to refer to the 1949 Armistice lines established between Israel and its neighbours (Egypt, Jordan, Lebanon and Syria) after the 1948 Arab–Israeli War.
- The Purple Line was the ceasefire line between Israel and Syria after the 1967 Six-Day War.
- The Green Line (Lebanon) refers a line of demarcation in Beirut, Lebanon during the Lebanese Civil War from 1975 to 1990. It separated the mainly Muslim factions in West Beirut from the predominantly Christian East Beirut controlled by the Lebanese Front.

=== South and East Asia ===
- The McMahon Line is a line dividing China and India, drawn on a map attached to the Simla Convention, a treaty negotiated between the British Empire, China, and Tibet in 1914.
- The Military Demarcation Line, sometimes referred to as the Armistice Line, is the border between North Korea and South Korea. The Military Demarcation Line was established by the Korean Armistice Agreement as the line between the two Koreas at the end of Korean War in 1953.
- The Northern Limit Line or North Limit Line (NLL) is a disputed maritime demarcation line in the Yellow Sea between North Korea and South Korea.
- The Line of Actual Control established by India and the People's Republic of China between Aksai Chin and Ladakh after the Sino-Indian War of 1962.
- The Line of Control established by India and Pakistan over the disputed region of Kashmir.
- The nine-dash line appears on maps used by the People's Republic of China and the Republic of China (Taiwan) accompanying their South China Sea claims, which are challenged by Malaysia, the Philippines, and Vietnam.

== Europe ==
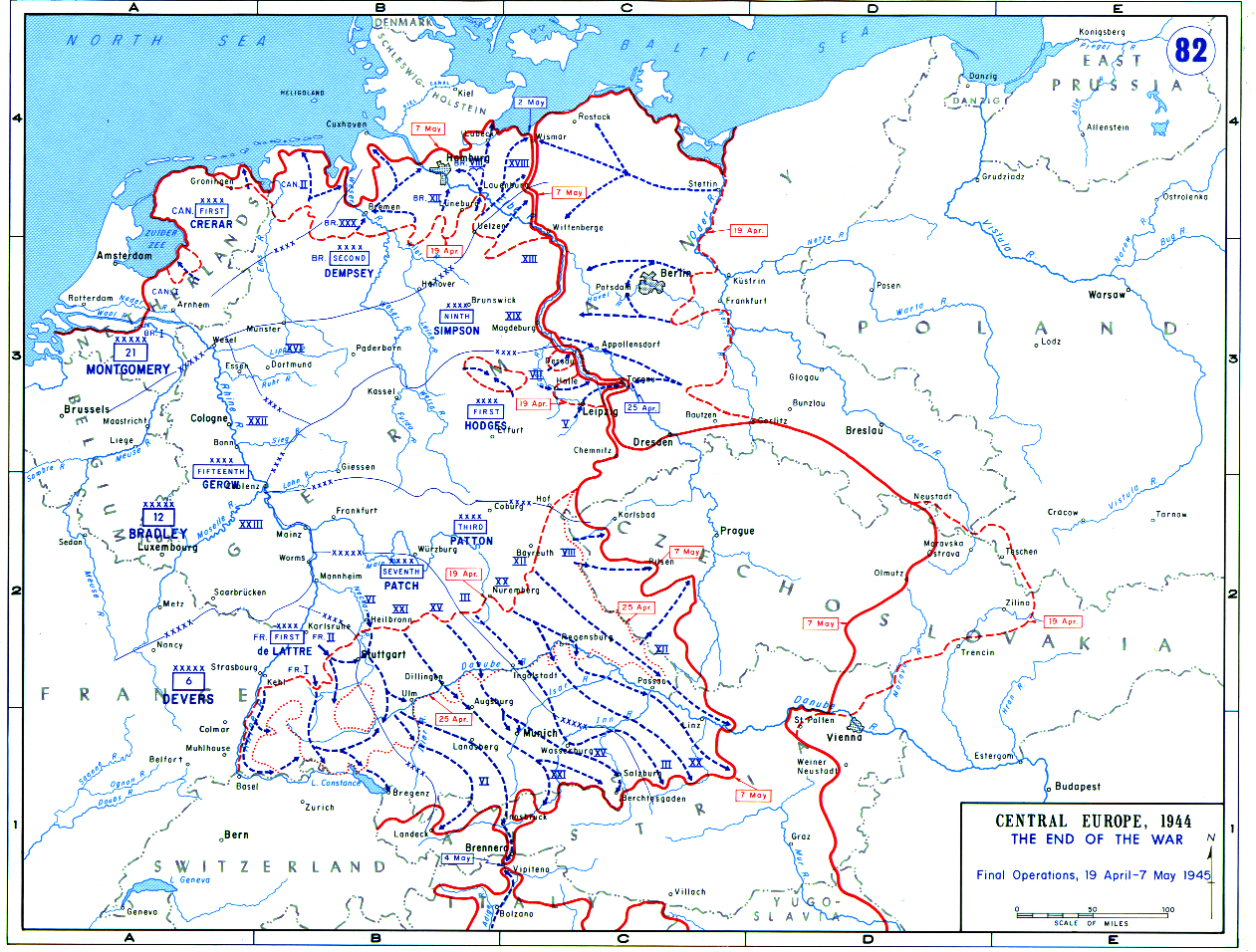
The Line of Contact, final positions of the armies of the Western Allies and Soviets, May 8, 1945.

- The Curzon Line was a demarcation line proposed in 1920 by British Foreign Secretary Lord Curzon as a possible armistice line between Poland to the west and the Soviet republics to the east during the Polish-Soviet War of 1919–21. The modern Poland–Belarus and Poland–Ukraine borders mostly follow the Curzon line, as this was used as the border with the Soviet Union after WWII. These are the borders of Ukraine and Belarus after the collapse of the USSR.
- The Foch Line was a temporary demarcation line between Poland and Lithuania proposed by the Entente in the aftermath of World War I.
- The demarcation line in France in Vichy France imposed by Nazi Germany from 1940 to 1942, with the German-occupied zone in the north and a free zone in the south.
- The Line of Contact was a demarcation line between Soviet-aligned forces and forces aligned with the Western allies, marking where Soviet-aligned forces and Western-aligned forces met as they advanced into Germany, Austria and Czechoslovakia at the end of World War II in Europe.
- The Bosnian Inter-Entity Boundary Line is an ethno-administrative border established by the Dayton Agreement that followed the end of the Bosnian War.

== See also ==
- Demilitarized zone
