= Peter Gerhard =

Historical geographer

Peter Gerhard (1920 – 15 February 2006, Fayence, France) was a historical geographer whose work focused on colonial Mexico or New Spain. He pursued graduate studies at University of California, Berkeley, and was influenced by Carl O. Sauer and Herbert Bolton.

== Publications ==
=== Books ===
- Gerhard, Peter (1993). A Guide to the Historical Geography of New Spain. University of Oklahoma Press. ISBN 978-0-8061-2553-4. {Review} (In Spanish: Gerhard, Peter (2000). Geografía Histórica de la Nueva España, 1519-1821 (in Spanish). ISBN 978-968-36-8135-5. Wikidata Q132530538.)
- Gerhard, Peter (1982). The North Frontier of New Spain. Princeton University Press. ISBN 978-0-691-09394-9.
- Gerhard, Peter (1979). The Southeast Frontier of New Spain. Princeton University Press. ISBN 978-0-691-05273-1.
- Gerhard, Peter; Gulick, Howard E. (1967). Lower California Guidebook: A Descriptive Traveler's Guide. A. H. Clark Company. ISBN 978-0-87062-016-4.

=== Articles ===
- Gerhard, Peter (1959). "El avance español en México y Centroamérica". Historia Mexicana. 9 (1): 143–152. JSTOR 25134993.
- Gerhard, Peter (1968). "Descripciones geográficas (pistas para investigadores)". Historia Mexicana. 17 (4): 618–627. JSTOR 25134714.
- Gerhard, Peter (1977). "Congregaciones de indios en la nueva España antes de 1570". Historia Mexicana. 26 (3): 347–395. JSTOR 25135561.
- Gerhard, Peter (1981). "Un censo de la diócesis de Puebla en 1681". Historia Mexicana. 30 (4): 530–560. JSTOR 25135756.
- Gerhard, Peter (1 January 1953). "Gabriel González, Last Dominican in Baja California". Pacific Historical Review. 22 (2): 123–127. doi:10.2307/4492027. JSTOR 4492027.
- Gerhard, Peter (1954). "Misiones de Baja California". Historia Mexicana. 3 (4): 600–605. JSTOR 25134350.
- Gerhard, Peter; Mathes, W. Michael (July 1995). "Peregrinations of the Baja California Mission Registers". The Americas. 52 (1): 71–80. doi:10.2307/1008085. JSTOR 1008085.
