= Lines of amity =

Imperial demarcation lines

During European empire-building overseas, the lines of amity were demarcation lines that distinguished between European states and the rest of the world. The line was generally drawn west of the Canary Islands and south of the Tropic of Cancer. It is often referred to in literature as "the line".

== Origin ==
In 1552, as French privateers threatened shipping, the Spanish and Portuguese signed an agreement to protect their fleets in the Indies. In a truce to settle tensions, the French agreed to end trade and navigation in the area. As a part of the 1559 Treaty of Cateau-Cambrésis, an oral agreement between Spain and France clarified that the French could navigate west of the 16th-century prime meridian and south of the Tropic of Cancer, but at their own risk. Although the treaty doesn't involve the other European states' competition in the Americas, it laid the precedent for all foreign affairs of the era. To the north and east lay Europe, while to the south and west was the extra-European world.

In 1634, French statesman and member of the Catholic Church Cardinal Richelieu wrote, “lines of the amities and alliances” (French: lignes des amitiés et des alliances) in a memorandum.

When it was drawn, there was disagreement among major European powers over where the line of longitude lay. The line of demarcation drawn by the papal state in 1493 is 100 leagues west of the Azores, whereas the line determined by the 1494 Treaty of Tordesillas trends further west. The Treaty aimed to divide territory among Portugal and Spain. Originally, all territory east of about 555 kilometers (345 miles) west of the Cape Verde islands belonged to Portugal, but eventually it moved about 1500 kilometers (932 miles) west in 1506 so that Portugal could claim the east of Brazil.

== Significance ==
The lines represented an important tension between Britain and their colonies in the 18th century. The expanse of the Atlantic only furthered the cultural, political, and social differences between Europe and the New World. The lines established a division between domestic European affairs and the happenings in the Americas. Namely, that the turmoil and conflict west of the lines were confined there, whereas the powerful orchestrators of international relations stayed in Europe.

Actions beyond the newly drawn lines of amity would not be considered a violation of international peace. As a result, they exacerbated the legal differences between Europe and its colonies. By separating the conflicts that happened outside of Europe, extraterritorial violence did not interrupt the peace of interstate treaties. The lines allowed for European powers to declare war and fight for territory overseas while maintaining "amity" at home. This phenomenon is often referred to as: "no peace beyond the line." While primarily fictive and not written in any formal treaty, they effectively created two different systems of foreign relations: that of the European mainland and that of their colonies.

Since international law was void west of the lines, the lines marked a shift in the necessity to maintain negotiations between world powers. The foundations of international order began to be laid when powers dissociated their federal government structures, from that of their colonies. Everyone beyond the lines were subjects, not citizens. The lines forced European politicians and monarchs to question to what extend they should, and were able, to restrict the political freedom and autonomy of colonies thousands of miles away. As a result, both Britain's imperial identity and national institutions are impacted by power-struggles from the age of colonialism.
