= Age of Pirates: Caribbean Tales =

2006 video game

- Developer: Akella
- Publishers: 1C Company; Playlogic
- Engine: Storm Engine 2.5
- Platform: Microsoft Windows
- Release: NA: 12 September 2006; EU: 20 September 2006
- Genre: Role-playing

Age of Pirates: Caribbean Tales, known in Russia as Corsairs III (Корсары III), is a role-playing video game developed by Akella and released for Windows in 2006. Due to legal issues, it does not bear the name of the developers' previous pirate games Sea Dogs or Pirates of the Caribbean. Unlike Pirates of the Caribbean, Age of Pirates was developed with the intent of serving as a true sequel to Sea Dogs despite the name change, and chronicles the story of the children of the main character from the original.

The sequel of the game was released in 2009, titled Age of Pirates 2: City of Abandoned Ships. In 2017, Age of Pirates was re-released on GOG and Steam as Sea Dogs: Caribbean Tales.

== Gameplay ==
The player can choose to play as Blaze Shark or his stepsister Beatrice Shark. When sailing on the map, time is accelerated to account for the travel across the Caribbean islands. Players have the freedom to enter ports, engage in ship-to-ship combat, or brave treacherous storms. Non-accelerated sailing and naval battles occur while navigating the open seas. On foot, players can partake in a range of activities, such as engaging in boarding actions, dueling enemy captains one-on-one, and exploring towns to recruit sailors and gather supplies.

== Reception ==
IGN Spain's David Soriano criticized the Spanish dub of the game by ranking it one of the ten worst video games dub for the Spanish language and calling it the worst dubbing for a video game, at least in Spain. He commented: "We do not know what kind of substances were in the study [in which the game was dubbed]".
