= Playlogic Entertainment =

Mobile gambling and video gaming company

Playlogic Entertainment, Inc
- Type: Public
- Traded as: OTCID Basic: PLGC
- Industry: Video games
- Founded: 2002
- Founder: Rogier Smit
- Defunct: 2010 (bankrupt)
- Headquarters: Amsterdam, Netherlands
- Products: Fairytale Fights; Xyanide; Xyanide: Resurrection; Worldshift; Age of Pirates: Caribbean Tales; Age of Pirates 2: City of Abandoned Ships; ObsCure II; Infernal; Aggression; Aliens in the Attic; World Racing 2 Knights of the Temple II; Gene Troopers; Airborne Troops; Cyclone Circus; Pool Hall Pro; Vertigo; Red Bull BC One; Ancient Wars: Sparta; Stateshift; Building & Co; Alpha Black Zero; Dimensity; Sudoku Ball Detective; Dragon Hunters; Simon the Sorcerer 4 The Endless Days of Luckless John
- Number of employees: 110, with circa 300 external development staff (2010)
- Website: playlogicgames.com

Playlogic Entertainment N.V.
- Industry: Mobile gambling and console publishing
- Founded: 2010
- Defunct: 2014 (bankrupt)
- Headquarters: Amsterdam, The Netherlands
- Website: playlogicgames.com

Playlogic Entertainment was a company active in mobile gambling and console publishing, founded in 2002 by Rogier Smit.

== History ==
Playlogic Entertainment, Inc. was listed on the 'OTCBB' in New York, (ticker symbol: PLGC) in June 2005 and completed all SEC required filings until Q1 2010. The company renamed their listing and stock from Playlogic Entertainment Inc. to Donar Ventures in April 2011.

Playlogic International N.V. was a full subsidiary of Playlogic Entertainment, Inc. based in Amsterdam. Playlogic published games developed internationally as well as in-house through Playlogic Game Factory BV, a studio based in Breda with a team of around 80 people.

=== Bankruptcy and restructuring ===
On July 28, 2010, the company filed at the US Securities and Exchange Commission, voluntarily entering into 'surseance van betaling', the Dutch equivalent of Chapter 11 bankruptcy, after a few years of struggling with major losses and new games failing to bring in revenue.

On August 4, 2010, the court officially declared Playlogic bankrupt. Later that year, Playlogic Entertainment NV relaunched with some of the original staff, taking a focus on publishing already made games on digital platforms and gambling related games.

The restructured company completed the acquisition of mobile gaming and gambling company WannaGaming International BV in 2011. WannaGaming was founded 4 years prior to the acquisition.

In December 2014, Playlogic went bankrupt again.

== Games Developed ==
Playlogic gaming and gambling products included Fun Play and Real Play, handled by Microgaming Ltd. The company operated their Real Play components under a Maltese gambling license. Playlogic Game Factory also worked as a First Party contractor for Sony Computer Entertainment Europe (SCEE).

- Xyanide (2006)
- Aqua Vita/Aquatopia (2007)
- Mesmerize (2007)
- Tori-Emaki (2008)
- Mesmerize 2
- Fairytale Fights (2009)
- Eyepet (2009)
- Eyepet Move Edition (2010)
