= Sea Dogs (video game) =

2000 video game

- Developer: Akella
- Publishers: RU: 1C Company; EU: Ubi Soft; NA: Bethesda Softworks
- Producers: Dmitry Arkhipov; Joel Breton; Brent Erickson
- Designers: Dmitry Arkhipov; Constantine Sapronenkov; Renat Nezametdinov
- Programmer: Dmitry Demianovsky
- Composer: Yury Poteenko
- Platform: Microsoft Windows
- Release: EU: November 24, 2000; NA: November 27, 2000
- Genre: Role-playing
- Mode: Single-player

Sea Dogs (Russian: Корсары: Проклятье дальних морей, romanized: Korsary: Proklyat'ye dal'nikh morey, lit. 'Corsairs: Curse of the Distant Seas') is a role-playing video game for Microsoft Windows, developed by Akella and published by Bethesda Softworks in 2000.

In the game, the player is the captain of a ship and can serve as a privateer to a European power, or as a pirate. The game uses a custom 3D game engine and includes gameplay similar to Sid Meier's Pirates!, while also being a true inter-character dialog-centered RPG.

Sea Dogs is often credited as one of the first successful Russian games, and had a notable influence on Russian game industry. It was followed by four sequels, one of which was tied in to Disney's Pirates of the Caribbean franchise.

== Plot ==
The player's character, Nicolas Sharp, was raised by his mother since he was a child. The only memories left of his father are his departure on a ship, as well as a golden medallion he gave him. Nicolas grows, and as his father did before, goes to sea to seek adventures. Soon, he is captured by the Spanish, but manages to escape with a small ship and a crew. He arrives at the central British colony, where he has to start a new life.

Since the game is non-linear, the player may work for any of the three nations, as well as start a pirate's career. Searching for his father is always possible, but in order to succeed, the player will need to change his ship's flags a number of times. This quest will reveal the secrets of the main character's father's life story and his death, as well as his legacy.

== Development ==
Sea Dogs was announced in March 2000. It drew inspiration from games like Sid Meier's Pirates!

== Reception ==
Reception

Aggregate score
Aggregator	Score
Metacritic	71 of 100

Review scores
Publication	Score
AllGame	3.5/5
CNET Gamecenter	6 of 10
Computer Games Strategy Plus	3.5/5
Computer Gaming World	4/5
EP Daily	7.5 of 10
Game Informer	8.5 of 10
GameFan	77%
GameSpot	7.9 of 10
GameSpy	77%
IGN	8.5 of 10
Next Generation	4/5
PC Gamer (US)	81%
X-Play	3/5

The game received "average" reviews according to the review aggregation website Metacritic. Scott Steinberg of IGN was impressed with it, calling it "one booty call you won't want to miss". Ron Dulin of GameSpot was also positive about the game, saying it is "an adventure that can be enthralling despite its many problems". Samuel Bass of NextGen gave the game generally positive review despite noting its "flawed" design choices and lack of atmosphere.

== Sequels ==
Sea Dogs has had a number of sequels, most of which do not bear the same English title for legal reasons. The first sequel, Sea Dogs II, was renamed Pirates of the Caribbean when Disney acquired the game in mid-development. Despite being marketed as a tie-in to Pirates of the Caribbean: The Curse of the Black Pearl, which was released around the same time, it is largely unrelated to the plot elements of that film.

The second sequel, Age of Pirates: Caribbean Tales, is a direct sequel to the original Sea Dogs. The title was changed because Akella wanted to create a brand name that they could control, rather than their publisher.

Two indirect sequels would follow: Age of Pirates 2: City of Abandoned Ships and Sea Dogs: To Each His Own in 2009 and 2012, respectively. Caribbean Tales and City of Abandoned Ships would eventually be digitally re-released on GOG and Steam in 2017 under the original Sea Dogs title.
