= Pirates of the Caribbean (video game) =

2003 video game

- Developer: Akella
- Publishers: RU: 1C; NA: Bethesda Softworks; PAL: Ubi Soft
- Director: Dmitry Demianovsky
- Composers: Chip Ellinghaus; Grant Slawson
- Platforms: Microsoft Windows, Xbox
- Release: NA: July 8, 2003; EU: August 15, 2003 (PC); EU: September 5, 2003 (Xbox)
- Genre: Action role-playing
- Mode: Single-player

Pirates of the Caribbean (Russian: Корсары II: Пираты Карибского моря, romanized: Korsary II: Piraty Karibskogo morya) is a 2003 action role-playing video game developed by Akella and released for Microsoft Windows and Xbox. It is a sequel to Sea Dogs (Корсары) and was originally planned to be released as Sea Dogs 2, but was soon renamed as a tie-in to the first Pirates of the Caribbean movie. However, the game has little connection to the film aside from that. A version of the game for the PlayStation 2 was planned, but was later cancelled.

== Gameplay ==
Pirates of the Caribbean is an action role-playing game in which the player, as Captain Nathaniel Hawk, goes on a series of quests for any one of the countries that control the islands of the Caribbean in the 17th century. The player can buy new ships, recruit a crew and hire officers who will follow Hawk on his quest and help him in battle. The game features gameplay that takes place both on land and at sea, and allows the player to upgrade their character by earning skill points and gain new abilities.

== Plot ==
After a fierce storm, Captain Nathaniel Hawk arrives on the island of Oxbay. His first mate Malcolm Hatcher is retiring, and so Hawk must hire a new first mate and crew. As he leaves Oxbay, a French armada attacks the colony and captures it. Hawk manages to slip away and warn the English governor on Redmond Island, Robert Christopher Silehard, that Oxbay was attacked. The governor sends Hawk on a series of quests to aid him in the war against France: Nathaniel is sent to investigate the condition in Oxbay; prevent a supply ship from reaching Oxbay; unload English troops in the jungles of Oxbay and rescue the English spy from the clutches of the French.

While preparing for his next quest - annexing Oxbay, Nathaniel meets his old friends: Danielle Greene and Ralph Fawn. However, Ralph is killed when the soldiers arrive to arrest Danielle and Nathaniel himself is captured and imprisoned. While in prison he gets to know an old ex-cannoneer Edgar Attwood who was fired for drinking too much rum. He can be later hired by the player into his crew. Some time later, governor Silehard arrives and tells Nathaniel that a big mistake has occurred. He sends Nathaniel Hawk on another series of quests until Nathaniel meets an old inventor who aids him in finding a treasure that could defeat the ghost ship called the Black Pearl. In the final end game mission, Captain Hawk is confronted by the Black Pearl. Only during this fight can the Black Pearl be damaged. When the fight ends, the game is complete.

The game also contains a large number of side plots within side quests. For example, one side mission involves Hawk being enlisted to help a Dutch colonist find several kidnapped children.

== Development ==
The game was originally developed under the name Sea Dogs II, and is an indirect sequel to Sea Dogs, which was released in 2000. In Akella's native Russia, the game is still referred to as Corsairs II: The Pirates of the Caribbean (Корсары II: Пираты Карибского моря), with Corsairs (Корсары) being the Russian title for Sea Dogs. It has since been reissued in Russia as simply Pirates of the Caribbean (Пираты Карибского моря). Apart from the pirate theme, the setting, and the presence of the Black Pearl, the game otherwise has few connections to the Pirates of the Caribbean: The Curse of the Black Pearl film, which was released around the same time as the game. Actress Keira Knightley, who played Elizabeth Swann in the film series, voiced the narrator (two cutscenes at the beginning and end) in the game. The game used Akella's proprietary Storm2 engine.

According to Ken Christiansen, a former concept artist at Disney Interactive, the game was rebranded with the Pirates of the Caribbean license to tie in with the film following a cancelled internal pitch and enthusiastic reception to early screenings of the film.

== Reception ==
Reception

Aggregate score
Aggregator	Score		
Aggregator	mobile	PC	Xbox
Metacritic	N/A	64/100	65/100

Review scores
Publication	Score		
Publication	mobile	PC	Xbox
Edge	N/A	5/10	5/10
Electronic Gaming Monthly	N/A	N/A	5.33/10
Game Informer	N/A	7.75/10	7.75/10
GamePro	N/A	N/A	4/5
GameRevolution	N/A	C−	C−
GameSpot	N/A	7.6/10	7.6/10
GameSpy	N/A	2/5	2/5
GameZone	N/A	7.9/10	7.5/10
IGN	5/10	7.2/10	7.5/10
Official Xbox Magazine (US)	N/A	N/A	7/10
PC Gamer (US)	N/A	65%	N/A
The Cincinnati Enquirer	N/A	N/A	3.5/5
The Village Voice	N/A	N/A	7/10

Pirates of the Caribbean received "mixed or average reviews" on both platforms according to video game review aggregator Metacritic.

== Additional versions ==
The mobile phone version was developed by Flying Tiger Development and published through Walt Disney Internet Group on July 25, 2003.
