= List of PC games (A) =

The following list of PC games contains an alphabetized and segmented table of video games that are playable on the PC, but not necessarily exclusively on the PC. It includes games for multiple PC operating systems, such as Windows, Linux, DOS, Unix and OS X. This list does not include games that can only be played on PC by use of an emulator.

== List ==
Note this page only covers games beginning with A. Use the table of contents for more.

=== A ===
Name	Developer	Publisher	Genre(s)	Operating system(s)	Date released
The A-Files	Gyldendal	Gyldendal	Adventure, Educational	Windows, Mac	1998
A-Men 2	Bloober Team	Bloober Team	Adventure, Puzzle	Microsoft Windows	24 Jun 2015
A-Train	Artdink	JP: Artdink; NA: Maxis; EU: Ocean Software	Vehicle Simulation Game	Windows, Mac	1985
A-10 Cuba!	Parsoft Interactive	Activision	Flight simulator	Windows, Mac	30 Nov 1996
A.D. 2044	R.M.P. Software	LK Avalon	Adventure	Microsoft Windows	6 Sep 1996
A.D.A.M. Life's Greatest Mysteries	Columbia Healthcare Corporation	Columbia Healthcare Corporation	Educational	Microsoft Windows	1996
A.D.A.M. The Inside Story	Columbia Healthcare Corporation	Columbia Healthcare Corporation	Educational	Microsoft Windows	1995
A Dance of Fire and Ice	fizzd	7th Beat Games	Rhythm/Music	macOS, Microsoft Windows	25 Jan 2019
A.R.E.S.: Extinction Agenda	Extend Studio	Origo Games, Aksys Games	Action, platform	Microsoft Windows	14 Dec 2010
A Girls Fabric Face	Stanislaw Truchowskit	TurnVex	Adventure	Microsoft Windows	10 Mar 2017
A Hat in Time	Gears for Breakfast	Gears for Breakfast	Platform, action-adventure	macOS, Microsoft Windows	5 Oct 2017
A Game of Thrones: Genesis	Cyanide	Focus Home Interactive	Strategy	Microsoft Windows	28 Sep 2011
A Passion for Art: Renoir, Cezanne, Matisse, and Dr. Barnes	Corbis Corporation	Corbis Corporation	Fine Art	Microsoft Windows	1995
A to Zap! Featuring the Sunbuddies	ImageBuilder Software	ImageBuilder Software	Educational	Microsoft Windows, macOS	1995
AaAaAA!!! – A Reckless Disregard for Gravity	Dejobaan Games	Dejobaan Games	Simulation	Microsoft Windows	3 Sep 2009
Aaero	Mad Fellows	Mad Fellows	Action, Rhythm/Music	Microsoft Windows	11 Apr 2017
ABC Sports Indy Racing	Shot Sports Software	ABC Interactive	Racing	Microsoft Windows	1997
ABC Sports Monday Night Football	OT Sports]	ABC Interactive	Sports	Microsoft Windows	1996
Abomination: The Nemesis Project	Hothouse Creations	Eidos Interactive	Action, real-time tactics	Microsoft Windows	1999
Absolute Drift	Funselektor Labs	Funselektor Labs	Racing game	Microsoft Windows	29 Jul 2015
Absolute Force Online	TQ Digital	NetDragon Websoft Inc.	First-person shooter, third-person shooter	Microsoft Windows	15 Nov 2012
Absolver	Sloclap	Devolver Digital	Action role-playing	Microsoft Windows	29 Aug 2017
Abyss Odyssey	ACE Team	Atlus	Roguelike, action-adventure	Microsoft Windows	28 Jul 2015
Abzû	Giant Squid Studios	505 Games	Adventure, art game, simulation	Microsoft Windows	2 Aug 2019
Accel World vs. Sword Art Online: Millennium Twilight	Artdink	Bandai Namco Entertainment	Action role-playing	Microsoft Windows	12 Sep 2017
Acceleration of Suguri X Edition	Orange Juice	Rockin' Android	Fighting	Microsoft Windows	15 Feb 2011
Accolade Sports Collection	Sports	QUByte Interactive	QUByte Interactive; Atari	Microsoft Windows	30 Jan 2025
Accounting (video game)	Crows Crows Crows	Crows Crows Crows	Exploration game	Microsoft Windows	18 Oct 2016
Ace Combat 7: Skies Unknown	Bandai Namco Studios	Bandai Namco Entertainment	Combat flight simulator	Microsoft Windows	1 Feb 2019
Ace Combat: Assault Horizon	Project Aces	Namco Bandai Games	Combat flight simulator	Microsoft Windows	24 Jan 2013
Ace Lightning	Absolute Studios	Gamezlab	Action-adventure, third-person shooter, platform game	IBM PC	25 Oct 2002
Ace of Spades	Jagex	Jagex	First-person shooter	Microsoft Windows, macOS	12 Dec 2012
Ace Online	MasangSoft Inc.	Many	MMO, 3D Space Shooter	Microsoft Windows	26 May 2006
Ace Ventura: The CD-Rom Game	7th Level	Bomico Entertainment Software	Graphic Adventure (Point-and-click)	Microsoft Windows	31 Oct 1996
Aces High	HiTech Creations	HiTech Creations	Combat flight simulator	Microsoft Windows	8 May 2000
Aces of the Galaxy	Artech Digital Entertainment	Vivendi Games	Rail shooter	Microsoft Windows	4 Jun 2008
Aces of the Pacific	Dynamix	Sierra Entertainment	Combat flight simulator	MS-DOS	8 Nov 1992
Achron	Hazardous Software, Inc.	Hazardous Software, Inc.	Real-time strategy	Microsoft Windows	29 Aug 2011
Achtung Panzer: Kharkov 1943	Graviteam	Paradox Interactive	Real-time strategy, Wargame	Microsoft Windows	25 Feb 2010
Achtung Spitfire!	Big Time Software	Avalon Hill	Strategy, Computer wargaming	Microsoft Windows	31 Aug 1997
Acrophobia (game)	Andrea Jennifer Shubert	Internet Relay Chat	Word	Microsoft Windows	1995
Act of Aggression	Eugen Systems	Focus Home Interactive	Real-time strategy	Microsoft Windows	2 Sep 2015
Act of War: Direct Action	Eugen Systems	Atari, Inc.	Real-time Strategy (RTS)	Microsoft Windows	15 Mar 2005
Act of War: High Treason	Eugen Systems	Atari, Inc.	Real-time Strategy (RTS)	Microsoft Windows	24 Mar 2006
Action Quake 2	The A-Team	The A-Team	First-person shooter	BeOS, Linux, Mac OS, Microsoft Windows	12 Nov 1998
Activision Anthology	MumboJumbo, MacPlay	Activision	Compilation	Microsoft Windows, Macintosh	19 Nov 2002
Actua Golf 2	Gremlin Interactive	Fox Sports Interactive	Sports	Microsoft Windows	1998
Actua Ice Hockey	Gremlin Interactive	Gremlin Interactive	Sports	Microsoft Windows	1998
Actua Pool	Gremlin Interactive	Gremlin Interactive	Sports	Microsoft Windows	1999
Actua Soccer	Gremlin Interactive	Greenwood Entertainment	Soccer	Microsoft Windows	2009
Ad Verbum	Nick Montfort	Nick Montfort	Text Adventure, Interactive Fiction	Microsoft Windows	4 Oct 2000
AD&D Masterpiece Collection	Strategic Simulations	Strategic Simulations	Role-playing video game	MS-DOS	1996
Adam's Venture	Vertigo Digital Entertainment	Soedesco	Adventure	Microsoft Windows	2009
Addiction Pinball	Team17	MicroProse	Pinball	Microsoft Windows	30 Apr 1998
Adidas Power Soccer	Psygnosis France	Psygnosis	Sports	Microsoft Windows	1996
Adrift (video game)	Three One Zero	505 Games	Adventure	Microsoft Windows	28 Mar 2016
Advent Rising	GlyphX Games	Majesco	Action-adventure, third-person shooter	Microsoft Windows	31 May 2005
Adventure at the Chateau d'Or	Karma Labs	Karma Labs	Adventure	Microsoft Windows	2 Apr 2001
AdVenture Capitalist	Hyper Hippo Productions	Hyper Hippo Productions	Incremental	Microsoft Windows	30 Mar 2015
Adventure Pinball: Forgotten Island	Digital Extremes	Electronic Arts	Pinball	Microsoft Windows	21 Mar 2001
Adventures of Pip	Tic Toc Games	Tic Toc Games	Action, platform	Microsoft Windows	4 Jun 2015
AdvertCity	VoxelStorm	VoxelStorm	Tycoon game	Microsoft Windows, Linux, macOS	17 Apr 2015
Africa Trail	MECC	The Learning Company	Adventure, Educational, Simulation, Sports	Microsoft Windows, macOS	1995
After...	Ciel	Ciel	Visual novel	Microsoft Windows	27 Jun 2003
Afterlife	LucasArts	LucasArts	God game	Microsoft Windows, macOS	1996
Afterparty	Night School Studio	Night School Studio	Adventure	Windows, macOS	29 Sep 2017
Agatha Christie: And Then There Were None	AWE Productions	The Adventure Company	Adventure	Microsoft Windows	30 Sep 2005
Agatha Christie: Evil Under the Sun	AWE Productions	The Adventure Company	Adventure	Microsoft Windows	16 Oct 2007
Agatha Christie: Murder on the Orient Express	AWE Productions	The Adventure Company	Adventure	Microsoft Windows	14 Nov 2006
Age of Booty	Certain Affinity	Capcom	Real-time Strategy (RTS)	Microsoft Windows	5 Mar 2009
Age of Chivalry	Team Chivalry	Team Chivalry	Action	Microsoft Windows	10 Sep 2007
Age of Conan	Funcom	Funcom	MMORPG	Microsoft Windows	20 May 2008
Age of Empires	Ensemble Studios	Microsoft Game Studios	Real-time Strategy (RTS)	Microsoft Windows	15 Oct 1997
Age of Empires: The Rise of Rome	Ensemble Studios	Microsoft Game Studios	Real-time Strategy (RTS)	Microsoft Windows	31 Oct 1998
Age of Empires II: HD Edition	Hidden Path Entertainment, Ensemble Studios	Microsoft Game Studios	Real-time Strategy (RTS)	Microsoft Windows	9 Apr 2013
Age of Empires II: The African Kingdoms	Ensemble Studios	Microsoft Game Studios	Real-time Strategy (RTS)	Microsoft Windows, macOS	9 Apr 2015
Age of Empires II: The Age of Kings	Ensemble Studios	Microsoft Game Studios, Konami	Real-time Strategy (RTS)	Microsoft Windows	30 Sep 1999
Age of Empires II: The Conquerors	Ensemble Studios	Microsoft Game Studios, Konami	Real-time Strategy (RTS)	Microsoft Windows	24 Aug 2000
Age of Empires II: The Forgotten	Skybox Labs, Forgotten Empires LLC	Microsoft Game Studios	Real-time Strategy (RTS) expansion pack	Microsoft Windows	7 Nov 2013
Age of Empires III	Ensemble Studios	Microsoft Game Studios	Real-time Strategy (RTS)	Microsoft Windows, macOS	18 Oct 2005
Age of Empires III: The Asian Dynasties	Ensemble Studios, Big Huge Games	Microsoft Game Studios, MacSoft	Real-time Strategy (RTS)	Microsoft Windows, macOS	2 Nov 2007
Age of Empires III: The WarChiefs	Ensemble Studios	Microsoft Game Studios, MacSoft	Real-time Strategy (RTS)	Microsoft Windows, macOS	7 Oct 2006
Age of Mythology	Ensemble Studios	Microsoft Game Studios, MacSoft	Real-time Strategy (RTS)	Microsoft Windows	30 Oct 2002
Age of Pirates: Caribbean Tales	Akella	1C Company, Playlogic	Role-playing video game	Microsoft Windows	12 Sep 2006
Age of Pirates 2: City of Abandoned Ships	Akella	Playlogic	Role-playing video game	Microsoft Windows	26 May 2009
Age of Wonders	Triumph Studios	Gathering of Developers	Turn-based strategy	Microsoft Windows	31 Oct 1999
Age of Wonders II: The Wizard's Throne	Triumph Studios	Take Two Interactive	Turn-based strategy	Microsoft Windows	12 Jun 2002
Age of Wonders III	Triumph Studios	Triumph Studios	Turn-based strategy	Microsoft Windows, Linux, macOS	31 Mar 2014
Age of Wonders: Shadow Magic	Triumph Studios	Gathering of Developers	Turn-based strategy	Microsoft Windows	25 Jul 2003
AGEOD's American Civil War	AGEOD	Matrix Games	Turn-based strategy	Microsoft Windows	26 Jun 2007
AGON	Private Moon Studios	Private Moon Studios	Adventure	Microsoft Windows	2003
Ai Space	Ai Space Production Committee	Ai Space Production Committee	MMOSG, Virtual world	Microsoft Windows	15 Oct 2008
Aion	NCsoft	NCsoft, NC Interactive, Gameforge	Massively multiplayer online role-playing game	Microsoft Windows	25 Nov 2008
Air Assault Task Force	ProSIM Company	Shrapnel Games	Wargame	Microsoft Windows	17 Nov 2006
Air Conflicts: Secret Wars	Games Farm	bitComposer	Flight simulation	Microsoft Windows	30 Sep 2011
Air Conflicts: Vietnam	Games Farm	bitComposer	Flight simulation	Microsoft Windows	26 Nov 2013
Airscape: The Fall of Gravity	Cross-Product	Cross-Product	Platformer	Microsoft Windows, Linux, macOS	11 Aug 2015
Alan Wake	Remedy Entertainment	Microsoft Game Studios, Remedy Entertainment, Nordic Games, E Frontier	Survival horror	Microsoft Windows	16 Feb 2012
Alan Wake Remastered	Remedy Entertainment	Epic Games Publishing	Survival horror	Microsoft Windows	5 Oct 2021
Alan Wake 2	Remedy Entertainment	Epic Games Publishing	Survival horror	Microsoft Windows	27 Oct 2023
Alan Wake's American Nightmare	Remedy Entertainment	Remedy Entertainment	Third-person Shooter	Microsoft Windows	22 May 2012
Alien Swarm	Valve	Valve	Shoot-em-up	Microsoft Windows	19 Jul 2010
Alpha Prime	Black Element Software	IDEA Games, Meridian4, Bohemia Interactive	First-person shooter	Microsoft Windows	25 May 2007
American Truck Simulator	SCS Software	SCS Software	Vehicle simulation game	Microsoft Windows, Linux, macOS	2 Feb 2016
Among Us	Innersloth	Innersloth	Party|Social deduction	Microsoft Windows	16 Nov 2018
Amnesia: The Dark Descent	Frictional Games	Frictional Games	Horror game	Microsoft Windows, Linux, macOS	8 Aug 2010
Amnesia: A Machine for Pigs	The Chinese Room	Frictional Games	Horror game	Microsoft Windows, Linux, macOS	10 Sep 2013
Anna	Dreampainters Software	Kalypso Media	Adventure	Microsoft Windows, Mac OS X, Linux	11 Jul 2012
Anno 1503	Max Design	Sunflowers	City-building game	Microsoft Windows	23 Mar 2003
Anno 1602	Max Design	Sunflowers	City-building game	Microsoft Windows	24 Sep 1998
Anno 1701	Related Designs	Sunflowers	City-building game	Microsoft Windows	3 Nov 2006
Anno 2070	Related Designs, Blue Byte	UbisoftAdded Achron	City-building game	Microsoft Windows	17 Nov 2011
Anno 2205	Blue Byte	Ubisoft	City-building game	Microsoft Windows	3 Nov 2015
Anomaly: Warzone Earth	11 bit studios	11 bit studios	Reverse Tower Defense	Microsoft Windows, Linux, macOS	8 Apr 2011
Antichamber	Alexander Bruce	Demruth	Puzzle platformer	Microsoft Windows, Linux, macOS	31 Jan 2013
Anubis II	Data Design Interactive	Metro3D Europe	Action	Microsoft Windows	14 Jul 2005
Apex Legends	Respawn Entertainment	Electronic Arts	Battle royale	Microsoft Windows	4 Feb 2019
Ark 2	Studio Wildcard	Studio Wildcard	Action-adventure; Survival	Microsoft Windows	TBA
Ark: Survival Ascended	Studio Wildcard	Snail Games	MMORPG; Action-adventure; Survival	Microsoft Windows	TBA
Ark: Survival Evolved	Studio Wildcard	Snail Games	MMORPG; Action-adventure; Survival	Microsoft Windows, macOS, Linux	29 Aug 2017
ARMA: Armed Assault	Bohemia Interactive	505 Games	Tactical shooter, military simulation, open world	Microsoft Windows	10 Nov 2006
ARMA 2	Bohemia Interactive	505 Games	Tactical shooter, military simulation, open world	Microsoft Windows	26 Jun 2009
ARMA 3	Bohemia Interactive	Bohemia Interactive	Tactical shooter, military simulation, open world	Microsoft Windows	12 Sep 2013
Asphalt 8: Airborne	Gameloft	Gameloft	Racing, simulation	Microsoft Windows	22 Aug 2013
Assassin's Creed	Ubisoft Montreal	Ubisoft	Action-adventure	Microsoft Windows	13 Nov 2007
Assassin’s Creed II	Ubisoft Montreal	Ubisoft	Action-adventure	Microsoft Windows	17 Nov 2009
Assassin's Creed: Brotherhood	Ubisoft Montreal	Ubisoft	Action-adventure	Microsoft Windows	16 Nov 2010
Assassin's Creed III	Ubisoft Montreal	Ubisoft	Action-adventure	Microsoft Windows	30 Oct 2012
Assassin's Creed IV: Black Flag	Ubisoft Montreal	Ubisoft	Action-adventure	Microsoft Windows	29 Oct 2013
Assassin's Creed Chronicles: China	Climax Studios	Ubisoft	Action-adventure; stealth	Microsoft Windows	21 Apr 2015
Assassin's Creed Chronicles: India	Climax Studios	Ubisoft	Action-adventure; stealth	Microsoft Windows	12 Jan 2016
Assassin's Creed Chronicles: Russia	Climax Studios	Ubisoft	Action-adventure; stealth	Microsoft Windows	9 Feb 2016
Assassin's Creed Freedom Cry	Ubisoft Quebec	Ubisoft	Action-adventure; stealth	Microsoft Windows	17 Dec 2013
Assassin's Creed: Liberation HD	Ubisoft Sofia	Ubisoft	Action-adventure	Microsoft Windows	15 Jan 2014
Assassin's Creed Mirage	Ubisoft Bordeaux	Ubisoft	Action-adventure	Microsoft Windows	5 Oct 2023
Assassin's Creed Origins	Ubisoft Montreal	Ubisoft	Action-adventure	Microsoft Windows	27 Oct 2017
Assassin's Creed Odyssey	Ubisoft Montreal	Ubisoft	Action-adventure	Microsoft Windows	5 Oct 2018
Assassin's Creed: Revelations	Ubisoft Montreal	Ubisoft	Action-adventure	Microsoft Windows	15 Nov 2011
Assassin's Creed Rogue	Ubisoft Montreal	Ubisoft	Action-adventure	Microsoft Windows	11 Nov 2014
Assassin's Creed Unity	Ubisoft Montreal	Ubisoft	Action-adventure	Microsoft Windows	14 Nov 2014
Assassin's Creed Shadows	Ubisoft Quebec	Ubisoft	Action role-playing	Microsoft Windows, macOS	20 Mar 2025
Assassin's Creed Syndicate	Ubisoft Montreal	Ubisoft	Action-adventure	Microsoft Windows	23 Oct 2015
Assassin's Creed Valhalla	Ubisoft Montreal	Ubisoft	Action-adventure	Microsoft Windows	10 Nov 2020
AssaultCube (AC)	Rabid Viper Productions	Rabid Viper Productions	First-person shooter	Microsoft Windows, Linux, macOS	18 Nov 2006
AssaultCube Reloaded (ACR)	AssaultCube Reloaded Task Force	AssaultCube Reloaded Task Force	First-person shooter, third-person shooter	Microsoft Windows, Linux, macOS	24 Dec 2010
Assetto Corsa	Kunos Simulazioni	Kunos Simulazioni	Racing, simulation	Microsoft Windows	8 Nov 2013
Assetto Corsa Competizione	Kunos Simulazioni	Kunos Simulazioni	Racing, simulation	Microsoft Windows	29 May 2019
Astebreed	Edelweiss	Playism	Shoot em up	Microsoft Windows	31 May 2014
AstroFire	ORT Software	ORT Software	Shoot em up	MS-DOS	1994
Attack on Titan	Omega Force	Koei Tecmo	Action, Hack and slash	Microsoft Windows	18 Feb 2016
Attack on Titan 2	Omega Force	Koei Tecmo	Action, Hack and slash	Microsoft Windows	15 Mar 2018
Audiosurf	Dylan Fitterer	Dylan Fitterer	Music, indie	Microsoft Windows	15 Feb 2008
Audiosurf 2	Dylan Fitterer	Dylan Fitterer	Music, indie	Microsoft Windows, Linux, macOS	2 Oct 2013
Automation - The Car Company Tycoon Game	Camshaft Software	Camshaft Software	Business simulation	Microsoft Windows	12 Mar 2015
Axis Assassin	Electronic Arts	Electronic Arts	Tube shooter	Apple II, Atari 8-bit, Commodore 64	1983
A Bastard's Tale	No Pest Productions	No Pest Productions	Action, Adventure	Microsoft Windows	26 May 2015
A Bird Story	Freebird Games	Freebird Games	Adventure, RPG	Microsoft Windows, Linux, macOS	7 Nov 2014
A Blind Legend	Dowino	Plug In Digital	Action, Adventure	Microsoft Windows, macOS	7 Apr 2016
A Bloody Night	Emanuele Leoncilli	Emanuele Leoncilli	Action	Microsoft Windows, macOS	23 May 2017
A Boy and His Blob	Abstraction Games, WayForward	Midnight City	Adventure	Microsoft Windows, Linux, macOS	19 Jan 2016
A Butterfly in the District of Dreams	Life a Little	Sekai Project	Visual Novel	Microsoft Windows	12 May 2017
A Chair in a Room: Greenwater	Wolf & Wood Interactive Ltd	Wolf & Wood Interactive Ltd	Adventure	Microsoft Windows	5 Apr 2016
A City Sleeps	Harmonix Music Systems, Inc	Harmonix Music Systems, Inc	Action, Shoot 'em up	Microsoft Windows, macOS	16 Oct 2014
A Date in the Park	Cloak and Dagger Games	Cloak and Dagger Games	Adventure	Microsoft Windows	14 Feb 2015
A Day in the Woods	RetroEpic Software	RetroEpic Software	Puzzle	Microsoft Windows, Linux, macOS	28 Oct 2011
A dead world's dream	JoqLePecheur	JoqLePecheur	Platformer	Microsoft Windows,	20 Sep 2016
A Demon's Game: Episode 1	RP Studios	RP Studios	Action, Adventure, Horror	Microsoft Windows,	19 Dec 2016
A Detective's Novel	Amaterasu Software	Amaterasu Software	Visual Novel	Microsoft Windows,	28 Jul 2016
A dragon girl looks up at the endless sky	DebonosuWorks Inc.	DebonosuWorks Inc.	RPG	Microsoft Windows,	27 Oct 2016
A Druid's Duel	Thoughtshelter Games	Surprise Attack, note	Turn-Based Strategy	Microsoft Windows, macOS	25 Feb 2015
A Duel Hand Disaster: Trackher	Ask An Enemy Studios	Ask An Enemy Studios	Shoot 'em up	Microsoft Windows, macOS	29 Aug 2017
ARIDA: Backland's Awakening	Aoca Game Lab	Aoca Game Lab	Adventure	Microsoft Windows	15 Aug 2019

== See also ==
- Index of DOS games (A)
- Index of Windows games (A)
- List of best-selling PC games
- List of free PC games
- List of video game emulators
- Lists of video games
