= Paul Cézanne: Portrait of My World =

1996 video game

- Developer: Corbis
- Release: January 1996

Paul Cézanne: Portrait of My World is a 1996 interactive CD-ROM developed by Corbis, allowing players to explore the life and work of Paul Cézanne. It was one of a series of six art-themed games released by Corbis, alongside titles like A Passion for Art: Renoir, Cezanne, Matisse, and Dr. Barnes, Volcanoes: Life on the Edge, and Critical Mass: America's Race to Build the Atomic Bomb.

== Development ==
The game was announced in December 1995.
