= A Passion for Art: Renoir, Cezanne, Matisse, and Dr. Barnes =

1995 video interactive expereerience

A Passion for Art: renoir, Cezanne, Matisse and Dr. Barnes
- Developer: Corbis Corporation
- Publisher: Corbis Corporation
- Platform: CD-ROM
- Release: 1995

A Passion for Art: Renoir, Cezanne, Matisse, and Dr. Barnes is a 1995 interactive CD-ROM by Corbis.

== Production ==
The game was released in the first quarter of 1995 - on Windows in February and on Macintosh in July. It is one game in a series released by Bill Gates' private company Corbis, including Volcanoes: Life on the Edge, Critical Mass: America's Race to Build the Atomic Bomb, and Paul Cezanne: Portrait of My World. The game was the company's first title after 6 years of development. The game went out of circulation as players began to find multimedia experiences to be insignificant when compared to other computer-based interactivity.

== Content ==
The title offers a multimedia exploration of private collections of postimpressionist paintings. It depicts the story of Dr. Barnes and his collection through virtual galleries, timelines, and documents. The title includes three guided tours through the content, based on different themes.

== Critical reception ==
The Washington Post deemed it one of the best fine-art CD-ROMs. Entertainment Weekly gave the game a B+, describing it as "fascinating". The New York Times deemed it a " great delight", praising its user-friendliness. Art, Education, and African-American Culture felt the title illustrated both the potential and the limitations of cultivating an interest in art through point-and-click gameplay. Eugene Register-Guard throughout the title offered the "most stunning" representation of paintings within a game.

The game received a Codie award for Best Use of Visual Arts in Multimedia on March 5, 1996. The game also won the Association for Multimedia International's Crystal AMI, HomePC magazine's Editor's Choice, Computer Life magazine's Best of Everything, and two NewMedia INVISION gold awards.
