= Lachesis (disambiguation) =

Lachesis is one of the Moirai, the personifications of destiny in Greek mythology.

Lachesis may also refer to:

- Lachesis (genus), or bushmasters, a group of venomous pitvipers found in Central and South America
- 120 Lachesis, an asteroid
- Lachesis, a character in Fire Emblem: Genealogy of the Holy War
- Lachesis, a character in the meta-time strategy game Achron
