= A Duel Hand Disaster: Trackher =

2017 action indie 3D video game

- Developer: Ask An Enemy Studios
- Publisher: Ask An Enemy Studios
- Platforms: Microsoft Windows, PlayStation 4, Nintendo Switch, Xbox One
- Release: Microsoft Windows; 29 August 2017; Nintendo Switch: NA: June 10, 2019; PAL: September 10, 2019; PlayStation 4, Xbox One; TBA
- Genre: Action

A Duel Hand Disaster: Trackher is an action indie 3D video game, developed and published by the American game studio Ask An Enemy Studios, for Microsoft Windows, PlayStation 4, and Nintendo Switch.

== See also ==
- List of PC games
