= Sakuna: Of Rice and Ruin =

2020 video game

- Developer: Edelweiss
- Publishers: WW: Marvelous; NA: Xseed Games
- Producer: Keisuke Kamiyama
- Designer: Nal
- Artist: Ryota Murayama
- Composer: Hiroyuki Oshima
- Platforms: Microsoft Windows; Nintendo Switch; PlayStation 4
- Release: NA: November 10, 2020; JP: November 12, 2020; EU/AU: November 20, 2020
- Genres: Action role-playing, simulation
- Mode: Single-player

Sakuna: Of Rice and Ruin (Note: Japanese: 天穂のサクナヒメ, Hepburn: Tensui no Sakuna-hime) is an action role-playing simulation video game developed by Edelweiss and published by Marvelous. It was first released in North America on November 10, 2020, for the Nintendo Switch, PlayStation 4 and the PC through Steam. It was later released in Japan on November 12 and in Europe and Australia on November 20.

A mobile game titled Tensui no Sakuna-hime ~Hinuka Junreitan~ was released on February 5, 2026. A spin-off game titled Sakuna Chronicles: Kokorowa and the Gears of Creation is in development.

== Gameplay ==
Players control the goddess Princess Sakuna, who is tasked with exploring the Isle of Demons and clearing it of monsters while also looking after a small group of human characters. The game is split between two separate gameplay styles: side scrolling hack and slash platforming levels that are gradually revealed on a map of the island as players complete objectives, and a farming simulator where the player must grow rice in a small paddy in the hamlet where Sakuna and the humans live. The side scrolling levels employ a 2.5D perspective, while exploring the hamlet and most rice farming tasks are done using a third person perspective from behind the player.

In the side scrolling levels, players explore and gather resources and use Sakuna's farming tools to fight demonic animals. Players can also grapple onto surfaces and zip about using a "divine raiment", a magical sash Sakuna wears that can extend to great lengths. The game features a day/night cycle, with enemies becoming more powerful and dangerous once night falls. At the end of the day, Sakuna can return to the hamlet and sit down to have dinner with the humans, eating a meal made using ingredients that the player has gathered. The meal restores Sakuna's health and stamina. Depending on the dishes served, the meal also activates certain abilities and provides various temporary buffs to Sakuna's stats for the next day. Sakuna can also ask the humans to help her gather resources, preserve ingredients for future consumption, and craft upgraded farming tools and clothing items.

Players cultivate rice through a process that takes place over several in-game seasons, with one season consisting of 3 in-game days. Growing rice requires multiple steps that take the form of several minigames which include tilling the field, planting the rice and adding fertilizer, and managing water levels and weeds before harvesting the rice and hulling it. Each rice harvest permanently increases Sakuna's stats, which players can further boost by improving the harvest's quality via careful management of their crop. Sakuna can save time by asking one of the humans to complete each rice farming task for her, though they will do so with less skill. By performing the tasks themselves, players will eventually unlock new abilities to make the process faster and more efficient.

== Plot ==
=== Setting ===
The game takes place in a world where two realms exist: the Lowly Realm, where humans reside; and the Lofty Realm, where gods reside. Connecting the two realms is the Tree of Creation, which also produces amber that gives life to gods.

=== Story ===
A band of humans, consisting of Tauemon, a samurai; Myrthe, a missionary; Kinta, a blacksmith apprentice; Yui, a young girl who is skilled at weaving, and a young boy named Kaimaru, come across a bridge that connects the two realms, suffering from hunger while ignoring a voice that tells them to turn back as humans aren't allowed in the Lofty Realm. They encounter a bandit named Ishimaru, who has been hunting them, but are interrupted by Princess Sakuna, a spoiled warrior and harvest goddess. After Ishimaru insults her, she knocks him off the bridge and into the sea of clouds below. She then warns the humans to leave as the bridge will soon disappear, but they ignore her and go into the Lofty Realm anyway to search for food. In the Mihashira Capital, while having a feast with her weapon familiar Tama (the voice from earlier) and her friend Kokorowa, an inventor goddess, Sakuna discovers that the humans have entered the capital and tries to stop them, but accidentally destroys the capital's rice garner. As punishment for her actions, head goddess Lady Kamuhitsuki tasks Sakuna with looking after the humans and banishes them to an island of demonic beasts (which would later be given the name Hinoe Island), where Sakuna's parents and the evil god Omizuchi once resided, requesting Sakuna to clear the place of demons so she can gain control over it before the time comes when she can send the humans back to their own world, as the bridge connecting the realms has disappeared and even she doesn't know when it will reappear.

Arriving on the island by boat, they meet Ashigumo, a weasel-like samurai and the last of his kind, who is friends with Sakuna's parents, also revealing that Tama once belonged to Sakuna's father. He brings the group to a mountain pass, where a farm that was once owned by Sakuna's parents is located, entrusting it to them. Sakuna journeys through the island fighting hordes of demons while helping the humans with farm work, as growing crops will strengthen her fighting skills. She also helps construct a forge, a weaving hut, animal pens, and additional fields on the mountain base while also taking in animals to help out with their work, such as dogs, cats, ducks, and a cow. At one point, Sakuna rescues some small creatures called kappas from one of the demons, who then decide to work in the farm as a sign of thanks. One winter night, Sakuna grows inpatient with her task and decides to return to the capital alone, but a rough storm prevents her from leaving, and is left no choice but to remain on the island. She later learns of dangerous creatures called specters, possessed corpses of Ashigumo's tribe who serves as a threat to both Sakuna's group and the demons. When the southern volcano begins intoxicating the island's rivers and demons are heading towards that area, Sakuna goes to investigate and discovers that the intoxication is caused by a powerful specter called the Homusubi Specter, and that the demons were trying to take it down. She manages to defeat the beast, who then falls into the lava. Afterwards, they learn that the demons are led by Ishimaru, who landed on the island before them as the sea of clouds that he fell through has no connection to space and time.

During dinner events, Tama reveals that Sakuna's mother used to be a human, who entered the Lofty Realm the same way as Tauemon's group, where she ended up on Hinoe Island and became an ally of Ashigumo's clan. She eventually became a goddess and met Sakuna's father, who was banished from the capital. When Omizuchi attacked, Ashigumo's clan was wiped out, but Sakuna's parents sacrificed themselves to defeat Omizuchi. Tama also believes that the demons' main base is a fortress that was once owned by Sakuna's father on the island's western side. The humans also share their own backstories. At one point, Tauemon reveals that he and Ishimaru came from the same group of bandits, who only attack the guilty. Ishimaru murdered the leader, who is revealed to be Kaimaru's father, as he was dissatisfied with his methods and believes that they should survive by whatever necessary means. Tauemon rescued Kaimaru, along with Myrthe, Kinta, and Yui (who were slaves at that time), and fled from Ishimaru, eventually arriving at the bridge to the Lofty Realm. He also requests for Sakuna to spare Ishimaru in hopes that he can be saved from his corruption. In one of the side quests, Sakuna discovers that Yui was originally a crane, who was given a human form by two otherworldly goddesses called the Visitors (who also created Sakuna's raiment, which was originally worn by her mother), but with a price. Because Sakuna accidentally made Yui break her vow, she has turned back into a crane, but Sakuna gets Kinta to help convince the Visitors to turn Yui back into a human using his relationship with her, but with a new price.

After developing a new type of rice to deliver to the capital, she discovers that Kokorowa has sabotaged her products and returns to the capital to investigate. She learns that Kokorowa was jealous of Sakuna gaining more attention from Kamuhitsuki and is tired of being overlooked, having been tempted into doing this by Ishimaru; however, her actions end up destroying the rice garner. Upon learning of this, Kamuhitsuki decides not to punish Kokorowa as her talents are needed in the capital, and allows Sakuna to visit the capital whenever she wishes, but reminds her of completing her task. Sakuna then decides to return to Hinoe Island, but not before reconciling with Kokorowa, who promises to visit her. The humans take in an injured demon rabbit despite the concerns of Kinta, Sakuna, and Tama. After confronting and defeating Ishimaru at his hideout, a volcano erupts. Ishimaru is revealed to be working for Omizuchi, who survived his defeat and went into hiding. Ishimaru made a deal with Omizuchi to prepare for his awakening in exchange for the power to control the demons. After Ishmaru leaves, Tama reveals that defeating Omizuchi would require sacrificing him, but Sakuna does not want to. She returns to the farm, only to find it destroyed by demons, discovering that the demon rabbit (later revealed to have been exiled by the other demons) that the humans took in unintentionally lured them to the farm's location, although the humans and Ashigumo have survived and taken refuge in a cave. Kokorowa arrives on the island and helps rebuild the farm, also adding a waterwheel. The now-powerless Ishimaru arrives to chat with Tauemon, but soon resorts to violence and tries to escape with Kaimaru as a hostage, but a strange influence attacks him, forcing him to flee without Kaimaru while Ashigumo pursues him. It turns out the humans have become gods as a result of their long stay in the Lofty Realm. Sakuna later obtains the Orb of Transformation from the capital to improve her products. Ishimaru is later killed by the specters. Upon learning of the Homusubi Specter's return, Sakuna fights off demons that she defeated previously along with Ishimaru's corrupted soul, who are under the Homusubi Specter's control. This finally convinces her to sacrifice Tama to defeat Omizuchi. After defeating the Homusubi Specter for good, they find that its core is actually the missing part of Tama's blade, which was corrupted by the island's negative energy, causing it to create the specters. After helping Kinta find the sword that he finished making, which is revealed to be created out of amber from the Tree of Creation but also giving the sword a will of its own, they have him convert Tama's missing blade into a weapon that they can use to defeat Omizuchi without sacrificing Tama.

During a festival on the island with the gods, Omizuchi's revival finishes, so Sakuna prepares to face him. After defeating Omizuchi, he humbly admits defeat just before Sakuna and Tama vanish. It turns out using her raiment's powers comes with a price that will result in them ending up in the Lowly Realm, but her parents (now free of their torment) and Kaimaru's spirits save her. Sakuna's parents sacrifice themselves to ensure that their daughter remains in the Lofty Realm, and Sakuna, Tama, and Kaimaru are returned to Hinoe Island. In the aftermath, Myrthe, Kinta, and Kaimaru return to the Lowly Realm while the others stay behind.

== Characters ==
- Sakuna: A spoiled harvest goddess who was banished to Hinoe Island along with Tama and a group of humans for an accident that she caused. Overtime, she becomes a more caring and responsible person.
- Tama: Sakuna's weapon familiar, who resembles a jade wolf. He once belonged to Lord Takeribi and now serves as Sakuna's guardian and mentor. Prior to the events of the story, he lost half of his blade.
- Tauemon: A human samurai. He is not good at fighting or farm work, but he does have helpful advice on farming. He gives Sakuna pointers on how to work on the farm. His full name is Katsura Uemon-no-jou Mizuki-no-ason Takamori.
- Myrthe: A missionary who came from a country called Ventania. She serves as a cook on the farm as well as a mother, teacher, and doctor. In the anime, it is revealed that she has long gold hair under her hood.
- Kinta: A blacksmith apprentice. Once a forge is built, he can create weapons and tools for Sakuna.
- Yui: A young girl who follows Kinta wherever he goes. She is very good at weaving. Once a weaving hut is built, she can create clothes for Sakuna. Later in the game, it is revealed that she was a crane who was turned into a human by the Visitors, but with a price that she must maintain or else she will lose her human form.
- Kaimaru: The son of a group of bandits whose father was murdered by Ishimaru. He was saved by Tauemon along with Myrthe, Kinta, and Yui.
- Ishimaru: A ruthless bandit who is willing to harm the innocent to get what he wants. After ending up on Hinoe Island, he becomes an ally to Omizuchi, who grants him the power to control demons in exchange for his help in reviving the evil god.
- Kokorowa: Sakuna's best friend. She is an inventor goddess who commands automatons.
- Ashigumo: A weasel-like samurai and the last of the Ashigumo Tribe. He is good friends with Sakuna's parents.
- Lady Kamuhitsuki: The head goddess and leader of the Mihashira Capital.
- Lord Takeribi: Sakuna's father and Lady Toyohana's husband, who was banished from the Mihashira capital for unknown reasons.
- Lady Toyohana: Sakuna's mother and Lord Takeribi's wife. She was originally a human who came from the Lowly Realm and is good friends with Ashigumo and his tribe.
- Omizuchi: An evil god who was defeated by Sakuna's parents, but survived and went into hiding.
- The Kappa: Small creatures who work at the farm after Sakuna rescues them from a demon.
- The Visitors: Two UFO-like goddesses who came from another world. They are the ones who made Sakuna's raiment and gave Yui a human form.

== Development ==
Sakuna: Of Rice and Ruin was developed by Edelweiss, a two-man team who previously developed the 2014 shoot 'em up game Astebreed. The team began working on Sakuna in 2015. Before they decided to focus on the farming and fighting elements, the game was going to be a sequel to Edelweiss' earlier title Fairy Bloom Freesia.

With Sakuna the director Nal wanted to address the criticism of their previous games for their lack of length, world-building, and story; most of the development time was spent making the rice-harvesting simulation as realistic as possible. Koichi, an artist for the game, conducted research by growing rice on his balcony and reading about agriculture from public libraries (such as the National Diet Library) and archives in rural regions. To research traditional Japanese homes, he visited Kyoto and Shirakawa-go.

The game was first announced at E3 2017. It was originally scheduled to be released in 2019 but was delayed to 2020. Towards the end of the development more than ten people were working directly on the game. Edelweiss set an initial sales target of 30,000 copies sold.

According to Edelweiss, there are no plans for downloadable content for the game.

== Reception ==
Reception

Aggregate scores
Aggregator	Score
Metacritic	PC: 82/100; NS: 80/100; PS4: 77/100
OpenCritic	80% recommend

Review scores
Publication	Score
Destructoid	7/10
Game Informer	7.5/10
Hardcore Gamer	4/5
Nintendo Life	7/10
PlayStation Official Magazine – UK	8/10
Push Square	7/10
RPGFan	85/100

Sakuna: Of Rice and Ruin received generally favorable reviews according to the review aggregator Metacritic. Fellow review aggregator OpenCritic assessed that the game received strong approval, being recommended by 80% of critics. It was a commercial success, with over 850,000 copies shipped by January 29, 2021. The game had sold 1 million copies by June 4, 2021.

== Legacy ==
Edelweiss stated in January 2021 that they hope to create a sequel in the future. In November 2024, a spin-off game, titled Sakuna Chronicles: Kokorowa and the Gears of Creation, and a mobile game were announced. This mobile game would later be titled Tensui no Sakuna-hime ~Hinuka Junreitan~ (天穂のサクナヒメ～ヒヌカ巡霊譚～) and was released on February 5, 2026, for the App Store and Google Play, with a PC port for Steam to be released at a later date. However, a couple months later, it was announced that the mobile game's services would be terminated on July 27, 2026, with the Steam release being cancelled.

In July 2021, three characters from Sakuna appeared as Spirits in the crossover fighting game Super Smash Bros. Ultimate. In late August the same year, Sakuna's outfit was made available in a DLC collaboration with Story of Seasons: Pioneers of Olive Town. Sakuna also appears in a collaboration with the 2021 rogue-lite action game Metallic Child.

=== Other media ===
- Sakuna: Of Rice and Ruin

天穂のサクナヒメ (Tensui no Sakuna-hime)
- Created by: Edelweiss
- Light novel

Tensui no Sakuna Hime: Kokorowa Insaku Nisshi
- Written by: Keiji Andō
- Illustrated by: Ryōta Murayama
- Published by: Shueisha
- Published: October 4, 2021
- Manga

Tensui no Sakuna Hime: Ikusa Datara no Kamigami
- Written by: Jiji & Pinch
- Published by: Hero's Inc.
- Magazine: Comiplex
- Original run: November 26, 2021 – November 25, 2022
- Volumes: 2
- Anime television series
- Directed by: Masayuki Yoshihara
- Written by: Jukki Hanada
- Music by: Yoshiaki Fujisawa
- Studio: P.A. Works
- Licensed by: Crunchyroll: SA/SEA: Medialink
- Original network: TXN (TV Tokyo), AT-X
- Original run: July 6, 2024 – September 28, 2024
- Episodes: 13
- Anime television series

Sakuna: Of Rice and Ruin — Kokorowa's Rice-Farming Diary
- Directed by: Masayuki Yoshihara
- Studio: P.A. Works
- Licensed by: Crunchyroll
- Original network: TXN (TV Tokyo)
- Original run: February 15, 2026 – February 22, 2026
- Episodes: 2

A spinoff light novel about Kokorowa written by Keiji Andō and illustrated by Ryōta Murayama, Tensui no Sakuna Hime: Kokorowa Insaku Nisshi, was released on October 4, 2021.

A manga adaptation by Jiji & Pinch, titled Tensui no Sakuna Hime: Ikusa Datara no Kamigami, was serialized from November 26, 2021, to November 25, 2022, on Hero's Inc.'s Comiplex manga website.

An anime television series adaptation was announced in March 2024. It is produced by P.A. Works and directed by Masayuki Yoshihara, with Jukki Hanada overseeing and writing series scripts. The series aired from July 6 to September 28, 2024, on TV Tokyo and its affiliates. The opening theme song is "Hare!" (晴々！; Seisei!) performed by Ikimonogakari, while the ending theme song is "Origami" performed by Little Glee Monster. Crunchyroll licensed the series. Medialink licensed the series in South and Southeast Asia for streaming on Ani-One Asia's YouTube channel.

A sequel to the anime series was announced in November 2024. It was later revealed to be a two-part television special based on Andō's novel, Kokorowa's Rice-Farming Diary, which aired between February 15 and 22, 2026, on TV Tokyo and its affiliates.

==== Anime episodes ====
No.	Title	Directed by	Storyboarded by	Original release date
1	"Princess Sakuna of the Lofty Realm"; Transliteration: "Itadaki no Yo no Sakuna-hime" (Japanese: 頂の世のサクナヒメ)	Yasuo Fujii	Yasuo Fujii	July 6, 2024
The episode begins with Sakuna, a harvest goddess, relaxing in a field of grain, which is then revealed to be a dream. Her friend Kokorowa, an inventor goddess, wakes her up and reveals that there are humans entering the Lofty Realm. The humans, consisting of Tauemon, Myrthe, Kinta, Yui, and Kaimaru, arrive on the bridge to the Lofty Realm and are told by a mysterious voice to turn back as humans aren't allowed in the Lofty Realm. Ishimaru, a powerful bandit, catches up to them with the intent on killing them. Though Tauemon attempts to protect the others, Sakuna interrupts their confrontation. After Ishimaru insults her, she knocks him off the bridge and into the sea of clouds below. She then warns the humans to leave as the bridge will soon disappear. Tama, a dog-like being, who was the mysterious voice from earlier, is unhappy with Sakuna for kicking a human and wants her to be more responsible. Meeting up with Kokorowa, they see the bridge disappear. Lady Kamuhitsuki, the head goddess, arrives to attend the banquet. Sakuna is then given a gift in graduate for her rice offerings. Tama then explains the history of her parents, Toyohana and Takeribi, and is displeased with how she handles her duties, also revealing that he is actually a weapon familiar that was once owned by Takeribi. Kokorowa's mechanical puppet detects intruders in the Lofty Realm, which turns out to be the same group of humans from before, and goes to confront them. Fearing that she might get in trouble, Sakuna goes after the humans. She finds them in the rice garner that houses her offerings, but accidentally destroys the garner. Kamuhitsuki is upset with Sakuna's actions while stating that humans and gods must stay in their respective realms. As punishment for her actions, Kamuhitsuki tasks Sakuna with looking after the humans and banishes them to the Isle of Demons, an island of demonic beasts where Sakuna's parents and the evil dragon god Omizuchi once resided, requesting Sakuna to clear the place of demons. Sakuna isn't happy with this news and blames the humans for their predicament before Tauemon cleans the air. After spending the night with Kokorowa, Sakuna, Tama, and the humans prepare for their trip to the Isle of Demons. Kokorowa and Tauemon share their knowledge of the Lofty and Lowly Realms with each other. Sakuna still doesn't want to leave, but reluctantly reconsiders after some convincing from Kokorowa, and is then forcefully taken onto a ship by Tauemon; however, Sakuna quickly begins to change her mind before everyone turns their attention to the sunrise.
2	"Living on Hinoe Island"; Transliteration: "Hinoe Shima ni Sumau" (Japanese: ヒノエ島に住まう)	Yuriko Abe & Yasuo Fujii	Yuriko Abe & Heo Jong	July 13, 2024
Sakuna's group continue to the Isle of Demons using a small boat, which runs into a storm. They spot the island just before a big wave strikes them. Having survived, the group reach the island. Tama instructs them to find the farm that once belonged to Toyohana. After some arguing, Sakuna agrees to lead the humans across the island, but encounter demon rabbits. Sakuna manages to defeat them. They are greeted by a weasel-like samurai named Ashigumo, an ally of Sakuna's parents, who leaves after an earthquake occurs. Catching up to him at a mountain pass, they introduce themselves. Ashigumo brings them to Toyohana's farm before he leaves to defeat some demons. The group explore the house and storage shed. Sakuna reluctantly agrees to gather food around the island while the humans work on the farm. Tauemon reveals that he has some rice seeds. During dinner, Tauemon reveals that he was a part of a gang of bandits who would not steal from the innocent. Ishimaru, who was also part of the group, murdered the leader, who is revealed to be Kaimaru's father, as he was dissatisfied with his methods and believes that they should survive by whatever necessary means. Tauemon rescued Kaimaru, along with Myrthe, Kinta, and Yui, who were slaves at that time and that Ishimaru planned to sell them, and fled from the bandits, eventually arriving at the bridge to the Lofty Realm. Sakuna promises to find food for them tomorrow, which pleases Tama. The next morning, Tauemon begins working in the fields. As Sakuna leaves, Myrthe wants to explore the island, but is discouraged from doing so by Sakuna. After slaying a large demon, she returns to discover that Tauemon messed on farm work and lost most of the seeds, revealing that he isn't good at farming or fighting. After Myrthe breaks up the argument, she attempts to cook the meat that Sakuna brought back, but ends up burning it. Sakuna and Tama find records of Toyohana's farming skills, but Sakuna isn't willing to do the job. The next morning, she reconsiders and starts working in the field.
3	"Rice Planting Song"; Transliteration: "Taueuta" (Japanese: 田植唄)	Yuki Nakano	Yasuo Fujii	July 20, 2024
Tauemon and Tama teach Sakuna how to do farm work as she continues her duties in the fields. She is dismayed that she has to collect wastes from the outhouse to create fertilizer, so Tauemon decides to handle it for her, but he messes up on it. Myrthe again struggles to prepare a proper meal. Tauemon has Ashigumo help with an unknown project. The next day, Sakuna learns how to plant seedlings and Tama explains that growing crops will increase her powers. After returning from a hunt, Sakuna decides to help remove weeds from the garden. During dinner, Myrthe makes a mistake with cooking dumplings. Tauemon and Tama explain that they may not be able to grow enough rice to survive and for Sakuna to get stronger due to how long it takes for it to grow. Sakuna gets fed up with working on the farm and decides to return to the capital, but rough waves prevent her from leaving, forcing her to return to the island. Kinta, Yui, and Myrthe reveal their special talents to her. They also show Sakuna a field that they made at the base of the mountain with Ashigumo's help. When the kids and Sakuna get into an argument while working in the fields, Tauemon helps them calm down by singing.
4	"Myrthe's Journey"	Shunji Yoshida	Masaki Tachibana	July 27, 2024
As Sakuna continues her farm work, she sees Myrthe attempting to start up a class, but the kids aren't interested. That night, Myrthe shares her backstory. Kinta takes the frog oil that Sakuna collected to try and create a fire, but makes it too powerful. This upsets Sakuna, but Myrthe stops their bickering. Sakuna then asks Ashigumo to help grow rice, but he declines as he doesn't need food and explains that his tribe left the island as they feared the demons. Learning of creatures called kappa living on the island, they decide to recruit them to help with the farm work. As everyone, except for Kinta, leave to search the island. Kinta asks Ashigumo to help with his desire to be a blacksmith and to build a forge. The group find the kappa in a pond, but they think the group are enemies due to Myrthe's blue eyes and throw rocks at them, injuring Yui in the process. Later, Sakuna, Tauemon, and Kinta leave to speak with the kappa, and Myrthe and Yui help tend an injured kappa that has found its way to the farm. Yui quickly goes to fetch the others, but returns to discover that Myrthe and the kappa are gone. A dog returns with Myrthe's necklace. Sakuna and Tama go to search for her, but encounter a catfish-like demon. She then finds Myrthe and the kappa, who reveals that the demons prey on the kappa. Myrthe scatters poison to weaken the demon, allowing Sakuna to slay it. They figure that the kappa only assumed Myrthe is an enemy is because her eyes look like the demon's. The kappa then agree to work at the farm. Kinta then asks Sakuna for a request.
5	"Kinta Repays His Debt"; Transliteration: "Kinta no Ongaeshi" (Japanese: きんたの恩返し)	Akira Kato	Heo Jong & Kosuke Kawamura	August 3, 2024
A new forge is built for Kinta to use. Upon noticing that the plants are dry, Tauemon explains the reason why before letting water in. Ducks also move into the fields to help with removing bugs and weeds. Kaimaru brings in a cat, which bothers the ducks. Kinta on the other hand is too busy with his work to help out with the farm. This makes Sakuna believe that Yui has a crush on Kinta, but Yui denies this and only wants to be friends. Learning of Yui's talents for weaving, Sakuna builds a weaving hut for her. Sakuna then tries to get Yui and Kinta to talk to each other, but is unsuccessful. She later learns that Kinta once saved Yui's life. Yui mysteriously disappears and a crane is seen leaving the weaving hut. Sakuna confronts Kinta over how he treated Yui, but he claims that him saving Yui's life did not happen. They and Tama go to find the crane. After defeating a shellfish demon, they find the crane. Kinta reveals that he once saw a crane caught in a trap and freed it (who is in fact Yui), making Sakuna see that the crane is actually Yui. Large UFO-like beings called the Visitors arrive, though Kinta can't see or hear them. They reveal that Yui used to be a crane, and that they turned her human via the power of connection. Yui must regain this power to turn her human again. At Sakuna's urging, Kinta expresses his relationship with Yui, but it is not enough. Finding a comb that Kinta made for Yui, he expresses his feelings for Yui, turning her human again. The group later spend the night driving bugs away from the field.
6	"Flames of Hatred"; Transliteration: "Urami no Honō" (Japanese: 恨みの炎)	Masanori Takahashi	Akari Aizaki & Kosuke Kawamura	August 10, 2024
While checking the crops, Sakuna feels an earthquake. She and the humans learn that the river is polluted with sulfur and that demons are heading to the volcano, which is the cause the earthquake. Sakuna reluctantly agrees to check it out. Arriving at the volcano, they find a dead demon. When Sakuna tries to flee, she encounters specters, living skeletal creatures. Ashigumo saves her and reveals that they are undead corpses of his tribe, who are killing the demons out of revenge and that something at the top of the volcano is controlling them. Ashigumo remembers how he and Takeribi fought Omizuchi. They fight the specters while continuing to head to the top, where they encounter a Homusubi Specter, which is what's controlling the specters and is the cause of the pollution. Ashigumo is wounded in the fight, forcing them to retreat. Back at the farm, as Ashigumo is recovering, Sakuna tries to master a new skill. She and Tauemon later harvest the crop in the field, and Sakuna learns how to make rice. Ashigumo leaves during dinner after a conversation with Sakuna, who is then given gifts by Kinta and Yui. The next day, Sakuna and Tama return to the volcano to fight the Humusubi Specter and manages to defeat its minions before damaging its core. Before falling into the lava, the Specter reveals that it and the others were murdered by both demons and a human. A funerial is then held for Ashigumo's tribe.
7	"The Melancholy of Kokorowa"; Transliteration: "Kokorowa-hime no Yūutsu" (Japanese: ココロワヒメの憂鬱)	Lee Ki-Seop	Heo Jong & Yasuo Fujii	August 17, 2024
Back at the capital, Kokorowa recalls how she has been doing following Sakuna's departure as Kamuhitsuki considers bringing Sakuna back. Upon returning, Sakuna tells Kamuhitsuki about the Humusubi Specter and that a human is controlling the demons. She then presents Kamuhitsuki the rice she grew, and reunites with Kokorowa; however, Sakuna and Tama plan to return to the Isle of Demons the next day. Sakuna is pleased to be back in her room and discovers a scroll that Kokorowa tries to hide, believing that she finally pleased Kamuhitsuki. As they spend the evening together, they recall how Sakuna tried to go to the Isle of Demons before when she was young. Kamuhitsuki gifts Sakuna with the rice that she was given, and reveals that she enjoys it. Sakuna leaves the capital the following morning. She then talks to the humans about the rice that she made as they continue with their farm work. Eventually, Sakuna intends to name her new rice product Amaho's Honor, though the humans instead name it Amahoho. Meanwhile, Kokorawa receives a bag from a demon rabbit.
8	"The Rice Riot That Shook the Capital"; Transliteration: "To o Yurugasu Kome Sōdō" (Japanese: 都を揺るがす米騒動)	Kazuya Kitō	Kazuya Kitō	August 24, 2024
A god from the capital visits the farm, but the humans can't understand him. They learn that someone has been altering Sakuna's rice into a dangerous product, who is suspected to be Kokorowa. Sakuna is unable to believe this, but Tama warns her that Kokorowa could get punished for her actions and that the same thing will also happen to Sakuna if she returns to the capital uninvited. The god helps Sakuna and Tama sneak back into the capital despite Tama's concerns. Kokorowa tells Kamuhitsuki about the hazardous rice and suspects someone is sabotaging the offerings out of jealousy, which Sakuna overhears. It is revealed that Kokorowa was the one responsible for the sabotage using the product she got from the demon rabbit. She meets up with Sakuna and after keeping her from taking the product, she has Sakuna sent back to the island, but she escapes and chases down Kokorowa, fighting off her automations along the way. Finding her in the rice garner, Kokorowa expresses her jealousy of Sakuna getting more attention than her; however, she accidentally destroys the garner. Their actions displeases Kamuhitsuki and after Kokorowa tells her the truth, Sakuna takes the blame to prevent her friend from being punished and is banished from the capital forever. Though she gladly accepts the demands, she quickly begins to change her mind. Kokorowa catches up to her and reveals that she is tasked to help Sakuna stop the demons and they will be allowed to visit the capital again if they are successful in their task.
9	"The One Who Controls the Demons"; Transliteration: "Oni, Suberu Mono" (Japanese: 鬼、統べる者)	Tomoaki Yamashita	Kosuke Kawamura	August 31, 2024
Kokorowa observes everyone working in the fields. They then discover an injured demon rabbit. Despite Sakuna, Kinta, and Tama's doubts, the others help treat the demon. Tama wonders how the demon found its way to the mountain pass as it should be hidden from demons. Deciding to find answers, Sakuna, Kokorowa, and Ashigumo use a dog to follow its scent, leading them to a temple that they believe is the demon's hideout. Demon rabbits ambush them, but Kokorowa uses her automation to repel them. When Tama becomes concerned about the pass, Kokorowa returns to the farm as Sakuna and Ashigumo enter the temple. Encountering more demons along the way, including a giant frog-like demon that Kokorowa's automation helps to distract, allowing them to press on. They encounter the Humusubi Specter, who survived. Ashigumo fights it alone as Sakuna heads to the top where she discovers that the demons' leader is Ishimaru, who ended up on the island before them as the sea of clouds below the bridge to the Lofty Realm doesn't have connections to space and time. Seeking revenge on Sakuna, he takes on a much stronger form. Though Sakuna manages to defeat him, she chooses not to kill him as she knows of his relationship with Tauemon, but the volcano suddenly erupts. Ishimaru reveals that Omizuchi survived his defeat and went into hiding. Ishimaru met him upon his arrival and made a deal to prepare for his awakening in exchange for control over an army of demons before leaving. Seeing flames in the pass, the duo return to find the farm destroyed by demons, presumed to have been led to its location by the injured demon rabbit.
10	"Comeback"; Transliteration: "Saiki" (Japanese: 再起)	Yoshihide Kuriyama	Junichi Sakata	September 7, 2024
Sakuna discovers that the humans survived the attack by hiding in a nearby cave. Devastated by this, Sakuna considers leaving the island, but decides against it after some convincing by Tama, and intends to rebuild the farm. Kokorowa returns, having temporally fled the island upon sensing demons in the area. As they start rebuilding, Ashigumo reveals that Ishimaru is missing as well as the true nature of the Humusubi Specter. Sakuna and Kokorowa return to the capital to request for the Orb of Transformation to create rice. Kamuhitsuki directs them to it, but are attacked by aphids. They retrieve the orb and return to the island, which has been mostly rebuilt, and use it to restore the soil. When Kaimaru goes missing, Sakuna, Tama, and Tauemon find him tending the same injured demon from earlier, but nevertheless spare it as it is revealed that it didn't intend to lure its fellow demons to the farm. In response, it turns into an ordinary rabbit, but is then seemly slain by Ishimaru.
11	"Light of Forgiveness"; Transliteration: "Yurushi no Hikari" (Japanese: 赦しの光)	Yasuo Fujii	Heo Jong	September 14, 2024
Tauemon confronts Ishimaru and recalls their past where Ishimaru had hated his group's ways of survival. Tauemon manages to defeat Ishimaru, but he tries to abduct Kaimaru, intending to make him suffer like his father. Kaimaru suddenly begins to glow, harming Ishimaru and forcing him to leave empty handed. They learn that Kaimaru and the other humans are transforming into gods like Sakuna's mother. When another earthquake strikes, they suggest informing Kamuhitsuki, but Tama warns them that doing so it will cause chaos to the Lofty Realm. Sakuna then comes to see the error of her past ways, but Kokorowa comforts her about it. Tauemon warns them about how heartless Ishimaru is now, but believes that there is still good inside him. Meanwhile, Ishimaru comes under attack by specters and the Humusubi Specter. Unfazed, he proceeds to fight them. Sakuna, Tauemon and Kokorowa discover specters and demons fighting each other, with Ashigumo caught in the middle of it. As Kokorowa and Tauemon return to the pass, Sakuna, Tama, and Ashigumo head to demons' lair where they discover that Ishimaru is possessed by the Humusubi Specter. It proves to be too powerful for them to defeat, but Tauemon and Kokorowa arrive and confront the possessed Ishimaru. Tauemon manages to defeat him, also revealing that the rabbit he thought to have slayed is actually still alive. Ishimaru then disappears into the afterlife. Sakuna finally decides to fight Omizuchi.
12	"The Blade of Hoshitama"; Transliteration: "Hoshitama Ken" (Japanese: 星タマ剣)	Yuriko Abe	Yasuo Fujii & Yuriko Abe	September 21, 2024
Tama tells the group about Omizuchi and how Sakuna's father defeated him. Sakuna's raiment is revealed to have been created by the Visitors. Tama reveals that he is half of the sword that was used to defeat Omizuchi, but he has to be sacrificed in order to defeat him again. Sakuna does not want to do so and tries to find alternative methods. When the volcano erupts, the group try to protect the fields. Eventually, Sakuna is left no choice but to sacrifice Tama. Sometime later, Kaimaru brings in a cow to work on the farm as they continue their daily routines. The next day, Tama requests for everyone to forge him into a new weapon to defeat Omizuchi without Sakuna knowing, but once she finds out, she is devastated.
13	"Sakuna: Of Rice and Ruin"; Transliteration: "Tensui no Sakuna-hime" (Japanese: 天穂のサクナヒメ)	Tadashi Yoshihara, Yasuo Fujii, Yuriko Abe & Masanori Takahashi	Masayuki Yoshihara, Yasuo Fujii & Yuriko Abe	September 28, 2024
A festival is held at the farm, but when the volcano erupts again, Sakuna announces her preparations to fight Omizuchi. She and Kokorowa set off to confront him with the kappa's help. They are joined by Ashigumo, who holds back the attacking demons to allow the girls to enter Omizuchi's lair. They discover parts of a tree that Omizuchi used to regain his power along with an area where Sakuna's parents once where. Kokorowa falls down a cliff, but Ashigumo saves her. Sakuna goes on alone to face the evil dragon god. Omizuchi traps Sakuna in a dream spell, but she escapes. Omizuchi discovers that she is Toyohana and Takeribi's daughter. Sakuna fights Omizuchi and his dragon clones, but is eventually outmatched. She eventually sees the missing part of Tama's blade inside of Omizuchi and manages to use it to slay him, but finds herself falling to the Lowly Realm due to her raiment coming with a cost of using its powers. She notices that Tama is alive and well, but their fall is suddenly stopped. The souls of Sakuna's parents, now free from Omizuchi, sacrifice themselves to save her with the help of Kaimaru, whose soul can temporally leave his body. Sakuna reunites with Ashigumo, Kokorowa, and the kappa as they head back to the farm to reunite with the humans. Kokorowa tells Kamuhitsuki of their mission's success, and Sakuna's group continue to work on the farm.

==== Specials ====
No.	Title	Directed by	Storyboarded by	Original release date
1	"Kokorowa's Rice-Farming Diary Part One"; Transliteration: "Kokorowa Inasaku Nisshi Zenpen" (Japanese: ココロワ稲作日誌 前編)	Tomoaki Yamashita	Masayuki Yoshihara	February 15, 2026
Following her time with Sakuna on Hinoe Island, Kokorowa has returned to the capital, but has trouble writing her new book. At the market, she sees Lady Uketama, an author goddess, telling everyone about her work. Sakuna and Tama come to the capital for a visit, showing her one of the books written by Koushi Oborozuki, Kokorowa's author alias. Kokorowa decides to go back to Hinoe Island and help grow rice despite how difficult it is. Sakuna reluctantly agrees. Kokorowa arrives on Hinoe Island with her automatons to set up a farm. Sakuna, Ashigumo, and Tauemon find a vacant farm area for her to work. During her time on the island, Tauemon crushes her rice seedlings at one point and her automatons break down from overheating, forcing her to tend the fields herself. She eventually collapses from exhaustion, but the others nurse her back to health. Tauemen reveals the reason why he crushed her seedlings is to help them grow. The others offer to help her and she accepts. Kokorowa later returns to the capital upon learning that her automatons are malfunctioning. After fixing them, she remembers receiving a message that says to publish her books. She later meets Uketama, who talks about Koushi. Kokorowa sails back to Hinoe Island, planning to continue growing rice and publish her new book soon.
2	"Kokorowa's Rice-Farming Diary Part Two"; Transliteration: "Kokorowa Insaku Nisshi Kōhen" (Japanese: ココロワ稲作日誌 後編)	Yuriko Abe & Tomoaki Yamashita	Masayuki Yoshihara	February 22, 2026
Kokorowa continues to help Sakuna's group work on the farm, having built new tools to help them. She is still unable to finish her book. Sakuna also helps her deal with a problem when her fields overflood, and Tauemon continues to teach her about growing crops. When Kokorowa's rice plants begin to sprout, she goes to tell the others, but finds that plant hoppers are poisoning their crops. They quickly remove the withered crops. Sakuna later heads to volcano to find the Flaming Core so that they can save the fields. Kokorowa gets the idea to perform a bug repelling ritual to protect their plants from bugs. That night, Kokorowa see a swarm of plant hoppers heading to the cave where her ship is and discovers that she unintentionally brought the bugs to the island. She tries to get rid of them, but the bugs merge to form a giant bug monster called an Ushi-oni that overpowers her automatons. Sakuna and Tama save her and discovers that a barrier stone is what's empowering it. The two eventually manage to defeat the monster. The next day, they begin harvesting the rice to create a new dish. Kokorowa is able to finally publish her new book titled The Story of Rice Cultivation, which impresses Uketama.

== See also ==
- Astebreed – an action shoot 'em up game developed by Edelweiss
