= ABC Sports Monday Night Football =

1996 video game

- '98 boxart
- Developer: OT Sports
- Publisher: ABC Interactive
- Platform: Microsoft Windows
- Release: NA: September 30, 1996; Monday Night Football '98: NA: September 30, 1997
- Genre: Sports
- Modes: Single-player, multiplayer

ABC Sports Monday Night Football is a 1996 American football video game by American studio OT Sports named after the television broadcast of the same name. OT Sports released a follow-up title a year later titled ABC Sports Monday Night Football '98 with an updated roster.

== Reception ==
=== ABC Sports Monday Night Football ===
ABC Sports Monday Night Football

Aggregate score
Aggregator	Score
GameRankings	65%

Review scores
Publication	Score
AllGame	3.5/5
Computer Gaming World	3/5
GameSpot	7/10

Monday Night Football received mixed reviews according to the review aggregation website GameRankings.

=== ABC Sports Monday Night Football '98 ===
ABC Sports Monday Night Football '98

Aggregate score
Aggregator	Score
GameRankings	55%

Review scores
Publication	Score
Computer Games Strategy Plus	2.5/5
Computer Gaming World	4.5/5
GameRevolution	C−
GameSpot	5.9/10
PC Gamer (US)	53%

Monday Night Football '98 received more mixed reviews than the original, according to GameRankings.

== See also ==
- ABC Monday Night Football (video game) – an NFL video game of the same name released a few years earlier
