= A Date in the Park =

2014 video game

- Steam version header art
- Developers: Cloak and Dagger Games
- Publisher: Cloak and Dagger Games
- Programmer: Shaun Aitcheson
- Writers: Shaun Aitcheson and Laurie Michel-Hutteau
- Engine: Adventure Game Studio
- Platform: Windows
- Release: 11 November 2014
- Genre: Adventure
- Mode: Single-player

A Date in the Park is a 2014 video game by British independent developer Cloak and Dagger Games. Described by the developer as a "short and mysterious free point and click adventure game", the game is based in Portugal and uses digitized photography of Tapada das Necessidades, a park in Lisbon, for background imagery. The developer stated the game was a side-project and "little experimental game" pending work on a larger project Legend of Hand and was developed over a three-month period. Following positive reception of the game, the developers placed the game on Steam Greenlight, leading to its release on Steam in 2016, and received recognition at the Adventure Game Studio Awards 2014.

== Plot ==
The protagonist, Lou, has recently moved to Lisbon to take up a new job and start a new life. He meets a woman named Catarina at a bar on a night out, and she arranges to meet Lou the following day in the park Tapada das Necessidades. Upon arriving, Lou experiences difficulties and has trouble communicating with the park gardener due to his inability to speak Portuguese. Lou rescues a duckling which has been attacked, carrying it in his pocket, which leaves his clothing stained with the duckling's blood. Wandering through the park, Lou begins to worry he has been stood up by Catarina, until he finds a package precisely where they were to meet. The package contains a note inviting Lou to "play a little game," and has clues directing him to retrieve a hidden music box. Within the music box is a letter directing Lou to finally meet Catarina at the gardener's shed. There, Lou finds another package, which upon opening is revealed to contain the severed head of the gardener. Fleeing from the park, Lou discovers the gardener's headless body. A police officer comes across Lou, bloodied from the duckling, standing over the corpse. The policeman draws his gun and commands Lou, who raises his hands and attempts to comply but is unable to understand or respond in Portuguese. The duckling bites Lou, causing him to suddenly reach for his pocket, which spurs the officer to shoot him. As Lou bleeds out, Catarina silently appears behind the officer and stabs him with a large knife. The duckling follows Catarina as she leaves the scene.

== Gameplay ==
A screenshot of A Date in the Park

A Date in the Park is a point and click adventure game using a two-click interface, with one mouse button used for character interaction and the other for observation. The game also contains an inventory to collect items to solve simple puzzles, such as keys. The player can walk by clicking on the area they would like Lou to travel to. A simple map is also available to assist in navigation to points of interest in the park, of which there are twenty areas. Once a player has visited an area, they can right-click to transition to the next area instantaneously instead of walking to it manually, in order to save time.

== Reception ==
A Date in the Park received lukewarm reception from critics. Positive reviews emphasised the game's effective use of atmosphere and horror. Writing for Rock Paper Shotgun, Konstantinos Dimopoulos stated the game was a "creepy game with a distinct horror vibe, one with some smart and successful ideas and a silly and sick but not quite disturbing plot," evaluating the game as "absolutely worth the hour or so it takes to reach its cool finale." Eurogamer praised the game as a "deliciously creepy (game) with (an) expert ratcheting of unease." Jayisgames noted that although the game "starts off a little slow" with "tranquil moseying around", but found the game to be a "grand telling of a story" and "something that must really be experienced first hand."

Some critics of the game also noted issues with pacing and storytelling. In a less favorable review, Willem Tjerkstra of Adventure Gamers found the game "didn't meet the same high standard as the developer's previous release," Mudlarks, stating the game's ending "leaves many questions unanswered" and that the low resolution and "somewhat pixelated look" of the game "takes away the feeling of immersion."

The game won 'Best Short Game' in the Adventure Game Studio Awards 2014, with the panel stating "the photographic backgrounds and ambient sounds make you feel like you are strolling through the park itself", noting that whilst the game was "a bit repetitive", "the good writing and amazing atmosphere make up for that".
