= A to Zap! Featuring the Sunbuddies =

1995 video game

- Developer: ImageBuilder Software
- Publisher: ImageBuilder Software
- Platform: Windows
- Release: 1995

A to Zap! Featuring the Sunbuddies is an educational video game by American studio ImageBuilder Software released in 1995 for Windows and Macintosh and released by Sunburst Communications. It is for ages 2 to 6.

== Gameplay ==
A to Zap is an interactive educational CD-ROM designed for preschoolers to learn the alphabet in a fun and engaging way. The main screen features a shelf of alphabet blocks above a toy chest. Clicking on a block reveals a word starting with that letter and displays an image representing it. Children can then click the image to enter one of 26 themed activity screens, each tied to a letter. These activities are simple enough for 3-year-olds, yet varied enough for 6-year-olds. The program offers customization options: parents can add new vocabulary words, record their child's voice for personalized interaction, and choose between uppercase or lowercase letters. A Parents' Guide provides descriptions of activities and tips for engagement.

== Development ==
A to Zap! was developed by ImageBuilder Software, a company founded in 1983.

== Reception ==
CNET said "A to Zap won't have your kids reading Time magazine in a week, nor will it get them to eat their vegetables. But it should do a swift job of helping them read and comprehend the alphabet--and that's saying something".

A to Zap! was a finalist in the Best Home Learning Program for Children category in the 1996 CODiE Awards. A to Zap! was named one of the top 100 CD-ROMs by PC Magazine.
