= A.D.A.M. The Inside Story =

1995 video game

A.D.A.M The Inside Story
- Developer: Columbia Healthcare Corporation
- Publisher: Columbia Healthcare Corporation
- Platform: CD-ROM
- Release: 1995

A.D.A.M. The Inside Story is a 1995 scientific educational interactive CD-ROM. It was one in a series of titles made in collaboration between Columbia/HCA Healthcare Corporation and A.D.A.M. Software, alongside titles such as A.D.A.M. Life's Greatest Mysteries, A.D.A.M. Nine Month Miracle, and A.D.A.M. The Inside Story, '97 edition.

== Format and interface ==
Information is organized in the style of a chapter book, with different sections providing information and digital illustrations pertaining to each of various organ systems within the human body. There is an option to block access to the section on the reproductive system and cover the intimate parts of the digital models of Adam and Eve with fig leaves.

== Reception ==
SuperKids called it an "excellent" piece of human body software. The game won a Codie Consumer Software Award for Best Home Learning Program.

The game ranked 10th on PC Data's list of Top-Selling Home Education Macintosh Software for December 1996.
