= A.D.A.M. Life's Greatest Mysteries =

- Developer: Columbia Healthcare Corporation
- Publisher: Columbia Healthcare Corporation
- Platform: Personal computer

A.D.A.M. Life's Greatest Mysteries is an educational interactive CD-ROM game. The title aims to debunk myths about the human body, mind, sickness, and other topics.

A.D.A.M. Life's Greatest Mysteries is a combination of two earlier titles, A.D.A.M. The Inside Story Complete, and Life's Greatest Mysteries. A.D.A.M. Nine Month Miracle, A.D.A.M. The Inside Story, and A.D.A.M. Life's Greatest Mysteries were bundled together in the A.D.A.M Back-to-School Pack that was sold in mid-1996.

In critique, the Sydney Morning Herald felt the game wasn't comprehensive, but would instead offer a surface understanding that would encourage young players to learn more. The Independent thought it was a "useful adjunct to multimedia encyclopaedias". The New Castle, Pennsylvania News praised the game's engaging animation and graphics.
