= A Blind Legend =

2015 French action-adventure audio game

- Developer: Dowino
- Publisher: Plug In Digital
- Platforms: Microsoft Windows; IOS; macOS; Android
- Release: June 10, 2015 IOS; April 7, 2016 Microsoft Windows
- Genre: Action-adventure
- Mode: Single player

A Blind Legend is an action-adventure audio game. The game was supported financially by Centre national du cinéma et de l'image animée and other organizations. It was published by French studio Plug In Digital, and developed by Dowino for Microsoft Windows, IOS, macOS and Android. The game has no graphics, and requires headphones to play and navigate within the game.

== Overview ==
The game has no video graphics and so the player requires stereo loudspeakers or a pair of headphones in order to play the game. The game uses binaural recording technology in order to render the sounds on the play field in 3D to make it possible for the player to navigate. The controls of the game are primarily by the use of different touch screen combinations to play. On Windows, the mouse can be used in place of the touch screen.

== Plot ==
The player assumes the role of a blind knight, Edward Blake, whose wife has been kidnapped by unknown captors. Accompanied by his daughter Louise, Edward must traverse the kingdom of High Castle, facing enemies and traps in order to save his wife from her mysterious assailants.

== Gameplay ==
=== Scenes ===
The game is divided into scenes, and a player must pass 1 scene in order to proceed to the next. If a player fails to pass the scene, for example when his character has been killed off, the player's total number of lives reduces and they must repeat the scene until the scene is completed.

=== Lives ===
The player is given five lives, which reduce whenever the player is killed by the enemies, is boiled over in the lake, enters into a bridge or is consumed by any trap. However, once the lives have been depleted, the player cannot play again until when the lives have been replenished.

=== Weapons and Controls ===
During playing, the following controls and weapons are available and which can be utilized by the player.

- Sword: Used to fight with enemies. Edward withdraws his sword automatically whenever he is challenged, but tapping the screen twice with two fingers also withdraws the sword.
- Shield: Whenever the player is confronted, they can pinch in the screen to activate the shield. If the player pinches out, the shield stops being active.
- Combo attack: This is performed by pinching in on the screen, then pinching out and flicking many times towards the direction of the enemy.
