= A Bastard's Tale =

2015 video game

- Developer: No Pest Productions
- Publisher: No Pest Productions
- Platforms: PlayStation 4, Microsoft Windows
- Release: Microsoft Windows; May 28, 2015; PlayStation 4; October 4, 2016
- Genre: Action-adventure

A Bastard's Tale is an action 2D video game, published by Swedish studio No Pest Productions for PlayStation 4 and Microsoft Windows. It received generally negative reviews from critics.

== Gameplay ==
The game features basic pixilated-base graphics and features the player defeating fifteen different enemy characters which are having their own distinct features, throughout five levels.

== Development ==
The game was developed and published by Swedish studio No Pest Productions. It released on PlayStation 4 on October 4, 2016.

== Reception ==
Reception

Aggregate scores
| Aggregator | Score |
|---|---|
| Metacritic | PS4: 48/100 |
| OpenCritic | 20% recommend |

Review score
| Publication | Score |
|---|---|
| Destructoid | 6/10 |

On review aggregator Metacritic, the game received "generally unfavourable reviews", earning a score of 48 out of 100, based on reviews from 7 critics. Fellow review aggregator OpenCritic assessed that the game received weak approval, being recommended by 20% of critics.

In his review for Destructoid, despite wishing that more care and attention had been devoted to the gameplay, Joe Parlock concluded that A Bastard's Tale is "still a short, campy, and very pretty experience that has a lot of heart to it, and for what it costs it's definitely worth checking out".
