= ARIDA: Backland's Awakening =

2019 video game

- Developer: Aoca Game Lab
- Publisher: Aoca Game Lab
- Director: Filipe Pereira
- Designers: Filipe Pereira, Vinícius Santos, Gildevan Dias
- Programmers: Laiza Camurugy, Túlio Duarte, Anderson Sampaio Carapiá
- Artists: Victor Cardozo, Jocivaldo Bigod, Daniel Argôlo
- Composers: Aldemar Júnior, Tharcísio Vaz
- Series: ARIDA
- Engine: Unity engine
- Platforms: Microsoft Windows; Android iOS
- Release: August 15, 2019; June 15, 2022 (Android)
- Genres: Adventure and Survival
- Mode: Single-player

ARIDA: Backland's Awakening (formerly known as Projeto Sertão) is an adventure and survival video game developed by Aoca Game Lab. The game was released in August 2019, exclusively for Windows, through digital distribution on the Steam platform. The player experiences the journey of Cícera, a young countrywoman who needs to overcome obstacles imposed by hunger and drought in the Brazilian backlands of the 19th century.

== Development ==
Arida was developed by a team of eight independent developers from the Bahia studio Aoca Game Lab, a studio founded by a historian, Filipe Pereira. The game received funding from SECULT - Secretary of Culture of the State of Bahia, through Edital Culturas Digitais FCBA 2014.

The game's atmosphere is inspired by the Canudos Region of the late 19th century, a region hit by a great drought. In order to portray the environment as faithfully as possible, the team of developers traveled to the Canudos region and spent a few days observing the region.

== Gameplay ==
Arida is set in the Canudos Region of 1896. Throughout the game, Cícera will have to overcome the obstacles imposed by the extreme drought. During the narrative, she will take part in historical facts like the War of Canudos (1896–1897). For this, the player needs to gather resources, and learn survival strategies to continue the journey, such as harvesting and cooking cassava to eliminate hunger, dig wells in search of water and cooperate with other characters. The main challenge is learning to deal with the tools and inputs available, and manage the resources in the best possible way.

== Reception ==
ARIDA: Backland's Awakening received positive reviews, with an aggregate score of 93/100 on Steam. A significant amount of praise was aimed at the music and art, but the game was criticized for its lack of polish and poor performance on release.

== Awards and nominations ==
Year	Award	Category	Result	Ref.
2017	5th BIG Festival	BIG Starter	Nominated	
2017	Gamepólitan 2017	Best Art	Won	
2018	SBGames 2018	Best Narrative	Nominated	
2019	Nordic Discovery Contest	Brazil Round	Nominated	
2019	SBGames 2019	Best Narrative	Nominated	
2019	SBGames 2019	Best Game	Nominated	
2019	SBGames 2019	Best Design	Nominated	
2019	SBGames 2019	Best Audio	Nominated	
