= Astebreed =

2014 video game

- Developer: Edelweiss
- Publishers: Edelweiss (PC Physical); Playism
- Platforms: Microsoft Windows; PlayStation 4; Nintendo Switch
- Release: Microsoft Windows: JP: 31 December 2013; WW: 30 May 2014; PlayStation 4: JP: 19 March 2015; WW: 25 June 2015; Nintendo Switch: WW: 8 November 2018
- Genres: Action, shoot 'em up

Astebreed (Note: Japanese: アスタブリード, Hepburn: Asutaburīdo) is an action shoot 'em up 3D video game developed by Edelweiss and published by Playism for Microsoft Windows in May 2014, for PlayStation 4 in March 2015, and for the Nintendo Switch in November 2018.

== Gameplay ==
Windows version screenshot.

Astebreed is an action shoot 'em up game. The player controls a mech with several attack options being that of a blade attack, a blade dash attack, a spread shot of 'bullets', two different lock-on functions, and a special "ex-attack". The various attacks are also the means by which the player defends either by canceling out enemy projectiles using the main gun or sword, or by using the sword dash attack to dodge.

== Reception ==
Reception

Aggregate score
Aggregator	Score
Metacritic	PC: 86/100; PS4: 82/100

Review scores
Publication	Score
4Players	83%
Destructoid	9.5/10
Eurogamer	8/10
Famitsu	32/40
GameZone	8.5/10
Nintendo Life	7/10
Push Square	8/10
USgamer	5/5
3DJuegos	8.5/10
Oprainfall	5/5
Vandal	8.7/10

Astebreed received positive reception from critics since its release.

== See also ==
- Sakuna: Of Rice and Ruin - an action role-playing and simulation game developed by Edelweiss.
