= Achron =

2011 video game

- Developers: Hazardous Software, Inc.
- Publishers: Hazardous Software, Inc.
- Designers: Chris Hazard and Mike Resnick
- Engine: Resequence
- Platforms: Linux, Mac OS X, Microsoft Windows
- Release: August 29, 2011
- Genre: Real-time strategy
- Modes: Single-player, multiplayer

Achron is a real-time strategy computer game. It is considered to be the first "meta-time strategy game" (Real-time strategy with time travel), notable for being the first game with free-form multiplayer time travel and its themes of concepts like the grandfather paradox. Achron was released on August 29, 2011.

== Plot ==
Hundreds of years in the future, humans have begun colonizing other worlds, however they have been reliant on conventional propulsion systems that may take hundreds of years to reach their destination. This all changed when alien ruins were discovered in the Remnant system. Technology present in the ruins led to the development of instantaneous teleportation. Within a few decades, all colonies were linked by a network of gates, and new colonies could be constructed in significantly less time. However, humans never came across another intelligent race, until communications with a border colony suddenly stopped. Several other colonies followed, and an enormous alien fleet was found laying waste to one of the colonies. A huge fleet was called to the Remnant system to meet the invaders; however, they were outthought and outmaneuvered at every turn, despite the invader's inferior firepower. As discipline broke down, the data feed from the Remnant gate went dark. Being trapped on the other side of the gate and as one of the survivors, they must piece together what happened and unravel the mysteries of the alien invasion and the Remnant system itself.

== Gameplay ==
The main aspect in Achron is the use of "chronoporters" that allow the equipment or troops to be transported to certain instances of time. Players can simultaneously play in the past, present, or future. Only a certain distance can be traveled in the past. After a while, the time-waves will occur, bringing along every change from the past into the present. Because the changes aren't instant, that gives the players a chance to react to the opponents' moves before they become irrevocable and directly linked to the present.

For instance, if the player is attacked at an unexpected spot, they can travel to the past and move their army towards the spot where they now know the attack will occur. Or if the player waged a battle which ended in defeat, they can jump to the past and prevent the battle from ever happening. That said, the opponent may alter the course of events as well in order to counter any changes in history the player made. Entire battles may take place in the speculative future as well, and players may take a look into the future to know what the results of their actions will be. Any opponent's unit can be "infected" with nanites, which allows the player to take control over it and see from its line of sight.

Additionally, apart from the player being able to view and command his forces in the past and the future, individual units may travel through time as well, with a process called "chronoporting". When it takes place, the player must be cautious to avoid "chronofragging" their units - that is, having units collide with previous or future instances of themselves (or other units) after traveling through time because they occupy the same physical space at the same time. Thus the player must move their units to deliberately free spaces in the time zone they want to send them to in order to avoid this; otherwise, the weaker of the two units ends up destroyed, with the stronger surviving but receiving certain damage. However, if one of the instances of the unit that originally time-traveled no longer does so, all the instances after it will cease to exist.

The main resource of the game is chronoenergy. It exists as a limitation to the interference with time. Issuing commands in the past costs chronoenergy, in order to prevent players from continually and endlessly countering the other's changes in the past and indiscriminately undoing all their mistakes. The deeper in the past modifications are and the more units being given the command, the more chronoenergy the orders will cost. It gets to regenerate faster the closer the player is to the present.

Chronoporting may lead to the grandfather paradox. In order to solve this, the game's engine automatically switches between the two possible outcomes until one of them falls out of the boundaries of the timeline and the other becomes the absolute outcome.

There are three different races, each with different abilities: Vecgir, skilled in teleportation, Grekim, experts in time travel, and the humans, who have the firepower advantage. Just as there is a mini-map to guide through, the game requires that there also be a timeline for orientation through time. All attacks occurring in the past or in the future are displayed on the timeline, as well as what point in time opponents are currently viewing and managing.

== Development ==
In 1999, Chris Hazard came up with a time travel video game concept during a conversation with his friend about Homeworld. It eventually led to the start of the development two years later. During that time, it was concluded that the current technology wasn't strong enough to handle the planned content. The project was restarted around 2006/2007, and Hazard brought his friend Mike Resnick to work together on it. They split the production tasks while working full-time - Hazard coded the Resequence Engine which powered the game, while Resnick integrated the art assets and designed the units logic. Achron was ready to be shown at the Game Developers Conference 2009. Every game tester was able to use the time travel option right at the beginning, with a design choice to slowly introduce the players to the mechanics by facing them with increasingly more difficult situations.

The game was announced on March 9, 2009, and a full release was planned for the first quarter of 2011. The release plan allowed pre-ordering customers to access alpha and beta versions of the game, as well as later-developed features such as level editing. Multiplayer was added on February 15, 2010, and the first official tournament was held during March 2010. The game was released on August 29, 2011.

== Reception ==
Reception

Aggregate score
Aggregator	Score
Metacritic	54/100

Review scores
Publication	Score
Destructoid	3/10
GameSpot	6/10
IGN	5/10
Jeuxvideo.com	11/20
The Escapist	3.5/5

Achron received generally mixed reviews from critics. It polarized many critics, receiving scores as high as 9/10 and as low as 3/10. On Metacritic it has a score of 54 out of 100 based on reviews from 11 critics. It won Best Original Game Mechanic from GameSpot in 2011.

The game received criticism for its graphics and poor pathfinding.
