= Critical Mass: America's Race to Build the Atomic Bomb =

1996 multimedia presentation

Critical Mass: America's Race to Build the Atomic Bomb is a 1996 multimedia presentation originally published by Corbis.

== Content ==
It documented the development of the atomic bomb during the Manhattan Project. It contained video biographies of Richard Feynman, Enrico Fermi, Robert Oppenheimer, and Niels Bohr. It had illustrated essays that also documented Edward Teller, Lise Meitner, Leo Szilard, Hans Bethe, and Albert Einstein.

== Development ==
The game was announced in December 1995.

== Reception ==
The game won the 1996 Invision Award of Excellence for Entertainment and Edutainment.
