= Volcanoes: Life on the Edge =

1996 video game

- Publisher: Corbis
- Platforms: Windows, Macintosh
- Release: 1996
- Genre: Educational
- Mode: Single-player

Volcanoes: Life on the Edge is a 1996 interactive CD-ROM published by Corbis. It recounts the expeditions by photojournalist Roger Russmeyer to volcanoes around the world.

Discover Magazine deemed it a satisfying title about Earth science. Technology Review deemed the title both the most conventional and arresting of Corbis' output. Newsweek described the project as "well-wrought". The Washington Post deemed it a first-rate CD-ROM documentary. The Sydney Morning Herald disliked the "humdrum photo-essays about low-key eruptions".

MacUser praised the well-organised interface while Popular Science enjoyed the "stunning" photographs. MacWorld gave the game 7.2/10.

== Development ==
The game was announced in December 1995.
