= List of video game developers =

This is a list of notable video game companies that have made games for either computers (like PC or Mac), video game consoles, handheld or mobile devices, and includes companies that currently exist as well as now-defunct companies.

See the list of video games for other lists relating to video games, and defunct video game companies for a more specific list of companies that no longer exist. Many of the developers publish their own games.

== List of notable developers ==
Legend
Active independently
Active as subsidiary
Defunct and/or no longer active

Developer	City	Administrative division	Country	Est.	Notable games, series or franchises	Notes
0verflow	Tokyo		Japan	1997	School Days; Summer Days; Cross Days	Visual Novel brand (both developer and publisher)
11 Bit Studios	Warsaw	Masovian Voivodeship	Poland	2010	This War of Mine; Frostpunk series	Indie developer/publisher
1C Company	Moscow		Russia	1991	King's Bounty: Warriors of the North	The company still exists, but Snowball Studios, the game development subsidiary, was dissolved in 2012 and former employees of the studios formed Snowbird Game Studios, and 1C Entertainment, the game publishing, localization, and development subsidiary, was acquired by Tencent and was renamed Fulqrum Games in 2022.
1-Up Studio	Tokyo		Japan	2000	Mother 3	Subsidiary of Nintendo. Formed by former employees of Square
2K Czech	Brno		Czech Republic	1997	Mafia; Mafia II	Former subsidiary of 2K; previously known as Illusion Softworks; closed in 2017 after merged into Hangar 13
2K	Novato	California	United States	2005		Developer/publisher/distributor/marketer; owned by Take-Two Interactive
38 Studios	Providence	Rhode Island	United States	2006	Kingdoms of Amalur: Reckoning	Defunct in 2012; their assets were acquired by THQ Nordic
3D Realms	Garland	Texas	United States	1987	Duke Nukem series	Acquired by Saber Interactive in 2021
42 Entertainment	Pasadena	California	United States	1993	I Love Bees	
4A Games	Kyiv; Sliema		Ukraine; Malta	2005; 2014	Metro series	They moved its headquarters from Ukraine to Malta; acquired by Embracer Group in 2020
5th Cell	Bellevue	Washington	United States	2003	Scribblenauts series	
989 Studios	Foster City	California	United States	1995	Twisted Metal III–4; Jet Moto 2124	Division of Sony Computer Entertainment America
Acclaim Entertainment	Glen Cove	New York	United States	1987		Developer/Publisher; declared Bankruptcy August 2004
Acclaim Studios Austin	Santa Clara	California	United States	1991	Turok series All-Star Baseball series South Park series	Acquired by Acclaim Entertainment in 1995
Accolade	San Jose	California	United States	1984	HardBall! series Star Control series Test Drive II–III	Former publisher and developer. Acquired by Atari, SA née Infogrames in 1999, name retired.
Access Games	Osaka		Japan	2002	Deadly Premonition	Subsidiary of Digital Media Lab
Access Software	Salt Lake City	Utah	United States	1982	Under a Killing Moon; The Pandora Directive; Top Spin series	Acquired by Microsoft
ACE Team	Santiago de Chile		Chile	2007	Zeno Clash series Rock of Ages series	
Acquire	Chiyoda, Tokyo		Japan	1994	Tenchu series Way of the Samurai series Shinobido series Akiba series No Heroes Allowed! series Octopath Traveler series Mario & Luigi: Brothership	Developer/publisher; acquired by GungHo Online Entertainment in 2011 and then acquired by Kadokawa Corporation in 2024
Action Forms	Kyiv		Ukraine	1995	Carnivores series	Their main employees moved to Tatem Games
Active Gaming Media	Osaka		Japan	2006		Game localization, debugging/testing, international indie game distribution, publishing
Activision	Santa Monica	California	United States	1979	Call of Duty series Interstate series MechWarrior 2	Also video game publisher; acquired several other developers; merged with Vivendi Games to form Activision Blizzard in 2008; acquired by Microsoft in 2023
AdHoc Studio	Los Angeles	California	United States	2018	Dispatch; The Wolf Among Us 2 Until Dawn 2	Indie developer / publisher formed by former Telltale Games employees
Adventure Soft	Birmingham	England	United Kingdom	1992	Simon the Sorcerer series	The development company is now defunct but the publishing company, Adventure Soft Publishing, is still active.
Akella	Moscow		Russia	1995	Age of Sail II; Age of Pirates series Sea Dogs	Defunct in 2012
Alfa System	Kumamoto City		Japan	1988	Tales of the World series Oreshika series	Acquired by Meteorise in 2021
AlphaDream	Tokyo		Japan	2000	Mario & Luigi series	Defunct in 2019
Amazon Games	Seattle	Washington	United States	2012	New World	Subsidiary of Amazon.com
Animation Magic	Gaithersburg	Maryland	United States	1991	Link: The Faces of Evil; Zelda: The Wand of Gamelon	Acquired by Davidson & Associates, a subsidiary of Cendant Software (latterly Vivendi Games), in 1997; closed in 2001
Amazon Game Studios, Orange County (formerly Double Helix Games)	Irvine	California	United States	2007	Silent Hill: Homecoming; Killer Instinct; Front Mission Evolved	acquired by Amazon and incorporated in Amazon Game Studios
Ambrella	Tokyo		Japan	1996	Hey You, Pikachu! Pokémon Rumble series	Acquired and merged by Creatures in 2020
Ancient	Hino		Japan	1990	Gotta Protectors series	
Anino	Manila		Philippines	2001	Despicable Me: Minion Mania	
Ankama	Roubaix		France	2001	Wakfu; Dofus	
Appy Entertainment	Carlsbad	California	United States	2008		
AQ Interactive	Tokyo		Japan	2005		Merged into Marvelous Entertainment in 2011
Aquria	Yokohama	Kanagawa	Japan	2002	Sword Art Online series The Caligula Effect	
Arc System Works	Yokohama		Japan	1988	Guilty Gear series BlazBlue series Dragon Ball FighterZ; Granblue Fantasy Versus series Umamusume Pretty Derby: Party Dash; Marvel Tōkon: Fighting Souls	Developer/publisher
Arcane Kids	Los Angeles	California	United States	2010	Bubsy 3D: Bubsy Visits the James Turrell Retrospective; Sonic Dreams Collection	
Arcen Games	Durham	North Carolina	United States	2009	AI War series A Valley Without Wind series Bionic Dues; The Last Federation; Starward Rogue	
Arkane Studios	Lyon		France	1999	Arx Fatalis; Deathloop; Dishonored series Prey	Subsidiary of ZeniMax Media
Arkedo Studio	Paris		France	2006	Hell Yeah! Wrath of the Dead Rabbit	Defunct in 2013
ArenaNet	Bellevue	Washington	United States	2000	Guild Wars; Guild Wars 2	Subsidiary of NCSoft
Arika	Tokyo		Japan	1995	Endless Ocean series Street Fighter EX series Tetris: The Grand Master series Tetris 99; Pac-Man 99; Tekken 8	
Arrowhead Game Studios	Skellefteå		Sweden	2008	Helldivers series	
Arkadium	New York	New York	United States	2001	Microsoft Minesweeper	
Artech Digital Entertainment	Ottawa	Ontario	Canada	1982	Monopoly Star Wars; Monopoly (2000)	Defunct in 2011
Artdink	Tsukishima		Japan	1986	A-Train series Sword Art Online series Dragon Quest HD-2D Remake series	
ArtePiazza	Tokyo		Japan	1989	Super Mario RPG remake	
Artificial Studios	Gainesville	Florida	United States	2001		Subsumed by Ignition Entertainment which was defunct in 2012
Artoon	Yokohama		Japan	1999	Yoshi's Island DS	Subsidiary of AQ Interactive; defunct in 2010
Arzest	Yokohama		Japan	2010	Wii Play: Motion; Yoshi's New Island; Sonic Superstars	Formed by former employees of Artoon
Ascaron	Gütersloh		Germany	1989	Sacred series	Developer/publisher; closed in 2009
Asobo Studio	Bordeaux		France	2002	Kinect Rush: A Disney–Pixar Adventure; Monopoly Plus; A Plague Tale series Microsoft Flight Simulator series (2020–)	
Aspyr	Austin	Texas	United States	1996		Game porting. Acquired by Embracer Group as a subsidiary of Saber Interactive in 2021.
Atelier 801	Lille	Hauts-de-France	France	2011	Transformice; Dead Maze	Indie developer/publisher
Atari Interactive (formerly Hasbro Interactive)	Pawtucket	Rhode Island	United States	1995		Acquired by Infogrames in 2001
Atlus	Tokyo		Japan	1986	Megami Tensei franchise: Shin Megami Tensei series; Persona series; Devil Summoner series; Tokyo Mirage Sessions ♯FE; Etrian Odyssey series Trauma Center series Catherine Metaphor: ReFantazio	Developer/publisher; acquired by Sega in 2013
Attic Entertainment Software	Albstadt		Germany	1990	Realms of Arkania: Blade of Destiny	Developer/publisher; defunct in 2001
Audiogenic	Essex	England	United Kingdom	1985	Brian Lara Cricket series	
Avalanche Studios Group	Stockholm		Sweden	2003	Just Cause series theHunter series Rage 2	Acquired by Nordisk Film in 2018
Aventurine SA	Athens		Greece	2002	Darkfall	
Bandai Namco Entertainment; Bandai Namco Studios	Minato, Tokyo		Japan	1955; 2012	Pac-Man franchise Tekken franchise: Tekken series; Tekken Tag Tournament series; Soul Calibur series Tales series Katamari series Klonoa series Ace Combat series The Idolmaster series Taiko no Tatsujin series God Eater series Super Smash Bros. for Nintendo 3DS and Wii U Pokkén Tournament; Mr. Driller series Mojipittan series Family Stadium series Go Vacation; Code Vein; New Pokémon Snap; Kirby Air Riders	Bandai Namco Entertainment is a subsidiary of Bandai Namco Holdings; Bandai Namco Studios was split off from Bandai Namco Entertainment in 2012
Bandai Namco Forge Digitals	Tokyo		Japan	1994	Digimon World series Super Robot Wars series Dragon Quest X Offline	Formerly known as Banpre Kikaku and Banpresoft; Subsidiary of Bandai Namco Entertainment
Bauhaus Entertainment	Tokyo		Japan	2006		Division of Imagica DigitalScape
Beamdog	Edmonton	Alberta	Canada	2009	Baldur's Gate: Siege of Dragonspear	Acquired by Aspyr in 2022
Beenox	Quebec City	Quebec	Canada	2000	Spider-Man game series Crash Team Racing Nitro-Fueled; Guitar Hero Smash Hits; Skylanders: SuperChargers	Acquired by Activision on May 25, 2005
Behaviour Interactive	Montreal	Quebec	Canada	1992	Dead by Daylight	
Behaviour Santiago	Santiago de Chile		Chile	2002	Assault Heroes series	Acquired by Vivendi Games in 2007 and then acquired by Behaviour Interactive in 2008; closed in 2017
Bend Studio	Bend	Oregon	United States	1993 (Founded as Blank, Berlyn and Co., later Eidetic)	Syphon Filter series Days Gone	Founded by Blank, Berlyn and Co. and Eidetic, acquired by Sony Interactive Entertainment as a part of SIE Worldwide Studios in 2000.
Bethesda Game Studios	Rockville	Maryland	United States	2001	The Elder Scrolls series Fallout series	In-house development team of Bethesda Softworks LLC which is a subsidiary of ZeniMax Media.
Big Ant Studios	Melbourne		Australia	2000	Rugby League Live series Rugby League 26; Don Bradman Cricket series AFL Live; AFL 23– Tiebreak	Acquired by Nacon in 2021
Big Blue Bubble	London	Ontario	Canada	2004	My Singing Monsters franchise	Acquired by Enad Global 7 in 2020.
Big Finish Games	Salt Lake City	Utah	United States	2007	Tesla Effect: A Tex Murphy Adventure	
Big Huge Games	Baltimore	Maryland	United States	2000	Rise of Nations series Kingdoms of Amalur: Reckoning; DomiNations	Acquired by Nexon in 2016
BioWare	Edmonton	Alberta	Canada	1995	Baldur's Gate series Mass Effect series Dragon Age series Neverwinter Nights; Star Wars: The Old Republic; Anthem	Acquired by Electronic Arts in 2007; closed in 2026
The Bitmap Brothers	London	England	United Kingdom	1987	Xenon series	Dissolved. Their portfolio was acquired by Rebellion Developments in 2019.
Best Way	Luhansk		Ukraine	1991	Men of War series	
Bits Studios	London	England	United Kingdom	1991	Spider-Man: Return of the Sinister Six	Acquired by PlayWize in 2008
Bizarre Creations	Liverpool	England	United Kingdom	1994	Project Gotham Racing series Geometry Wars series	Acquired by Activision in 2007; defunct in 2011
Black Forest Games	Offenburg		Germany	2012	Giana Sisters: Twisted Dreams; Destroy All Humans! remake series	Acquired by THQ Nordic in 2017
Black Isle Studios	Orange County	California	United States	1996	Fallout 2 Planescape: Torment; Icewind Dale	Subsidiary of Interplay Entertainment; closed in 2003
Black Rock Studio	Brighton	England	United Kingdom	1998	MotoGP 2 ATV Offroad Fury 3	Defunct in 2011
Blitz Games Studios	Leamington Spa	England	United Kingdom	1990	Karaoke Revolution	Liquidated
Blizzard Entertainment	Irvine	California	United States	1991	Diablo series StarCraft series Warcraft series Hearthstone; Heroes of the Storm; Overwatch	Developer/publisher; acquired by Vivendi and became part of Vivendi Games group in 1998; merged into Activision Blizzard in 2008
Bloober Team	Kraków	Lesser Poland Voivodeship	Poland	2008	Layers of Fear series Silent Hill remake series	
Bluepoint Games	Austin	Texas	United States	2006	Shadow of the Colossus remake Demon's Souls remake	Acquired by Sony Interactive Entertainment in 2021; closed in 2026
Blue Fang Games	Waltham	Massachusetts	United States	1998	Zoo Tycoon series	Shut down in 2011
Blue Tongue Entertainment	Melbourne	Victoria	Australia	1995	Jurassic Park: Operation Genesis de Blob; Marvel Super Hero Squad	Shut down in 2011; subsidiary of THQ
Bluehole Studio	Seongnam		South Korea	2007	TERA	Subsidiary of Krafton
Bohemia Interactive	Prague		Czech Republic	1999	Operation Flashpoint: Cold War Crisis; Arma series Take On Helicopters; Carrier Command: Gaea Mission; DayZ	
Boss Fight Entertainment	McKinney	Texas	United States	2013	Squid Game: Unleashed	Acquired by Netflix in 2022; closed in 2025
Boss Key Productions	Raleigh	North Carolina	United States	2014	LawBreakers	Founded by Cliff Bleszinski and Arjan Brussee
BreakAway Games	Hunt Valley	Maryland	United States	1998		
Broderbund	Eugene	Oregon	United States	1980	Prince of Persia series	Closed in 1998
Budcat Creations	Iowa City	Iowa	United States	2000	Madden NFL 2002 handheld version	Acquired by Activision Blizzard in 2008; defunct in 2010
Bugbear Entertainment	Helsinki		Finland	2000	FlatOut series Wreckfest series	Acquired by THQ Nordic in 2018
Bullfrog Productions	Guildford	England	United Kingdom	1987	Theme Park; Magic Carpet; Syndicate; Dungeon Keeper series	Acquired by Electronic Arts in 1995 and closed in 2001
Bulkhead	Derby	England	United Kingdom	2015	Wardogs Battalion 1944	Bought by Splash Damage in 2022, leading to the company joining Tencent but quickly left and joined a consortium with Team17
Bungie	Bellevue	Washington	United States	1991	Halo series Marathon series Oni; Myth; Pathways into Darkness; Minotaur: The Labyrinths of Crete; Operation: Desert Storm; Destiny series	Formerly a subsidiary of Microsoft Game Studios, acquired by Sony Interactive Entertainment in 2022
Camelot Software Planning	Tokyo		Japan	1990	Shining series Mario Golf series Mario Tennis series Golden Sun series	
Capcom	Osaka		Japan	1979	Mega Man franchise: Mega Man series; Mega Man X series; Mega Man Legends series; Mega Man Battle Network series; Mega Man Zero series; Mega Man ZX series; Mega Man Star Force series; Street Fighter franchise Resident Evil franchise Devil May Cry franchise Monster Hunter franchise: Monster Hunter Stories series; Ghost 'n Goblins series Strider series Final Fight series Dino Crisis series Darkstalkers series Ace Attorney franchise Onimusha series Sengoku BASARA series Dragon's Dogma series Viewtiful Joe series Ōkami series Dead Rising series Marvel vs. Capcom series Breath of Fire series Bionic Commando; Pragmata	Developer/publisher
Capcom Vancouver	Burnaby	British Columbia	Canada	2005	Dead Rising series	Founded as Blue Castle Games; acquired by Capcom in 2010; closed on September 18, 2018
Carbine Studios	Aliso Viejo	California	United States	2005	WildStar	Subsidiary of NCSoft
Cattle Call	Tokyo		Japan	1998	Metal Max series Arc the Lad series	Formed by former employees of Data East
Cauldron	Bratislava		Slovakia	1996	Chaser	Their assets were acquired by Bohemia Interactive
Cave	Shinjuku, Tokyo		Japan	1994	DoDonPachi series Mushihimesama series Deathsmiles series	
Cavia	Tokyo		Japan	2000	Drakengard series Nier	
CD Projekt Red	Warsaw	Masovian Voivodeship	Poland	2002	The Witcher series Cyberpunk series	Game development studio of CD Projekt
Certain Affinity	Austin	Texas	United States	2006	Halo series	Co-developed the Halo series; acquired by Keywords Studios in 2024
Chair Entertainment	Salt Lake City	Utah	United States	2005	Undertow; Shadow Complex; Infinity Blade series	Subsidiary of Epic Games
Chunsoft	Shinjuku, Tokyo		Japan	1984	Mystery Dungeon series Dragon Quest I–V	Merged with Spike to become Spike Chunsoft in 2012
CI Games	Warsaw	Masovian Voivodeship	Poland	2002	Sniper: Ghost Warrior series Lords of the Fallen	
Cing	Fukuoka		Japan	1999	Another Code series Little King's Story	closed in 2010
Clap Hanz	Yokohama		Japan	1998	Everybody's Golf series Everybody's Tennis series	
Climax Entertainment	Tokyo		Japan	1990	Runabout series	
Climax Studios	Portsmouth	England	United Kingdom	1988	Silent Hill: Origins; Silent Hill: Shattered Memories; Assassin's Creed Chronicles series	Acquired by Keywords Studios in 2021
Cloud Imperium Games	Manchester			2012	Star Citizen Squadron 42	
Clover Studio	Osaka		Japan	2004	Viewtiful Joe series Okami; God Hand	Subsidiary of Capcom; became defunct in 2007.
Codemasters	Southam	England	United Kingdom	1985	F1 series Colin McRae Rally and Dirt series EA Sports WRC series Operation Flashpoint series Grid series Brian Lara Cricket series	Former subsidiary of Reliance Entertainment; acquired by Electronic Arts in 2021
Coffee Stain Studios	Skövde		Sweden	2010	Goat Simulator series Satisfactory	Acquired by THQ Nordic AB (latterly Embracer Group) in 2018
Cohort Studios	Cardiff	Wales	United Kingdom	2006	Buzz! Junior series	
Coktel Vision	Paris		France	1985	Inca series	Former publisher
Colossal Order	Tampere		Finland	2009	Cities in Motion; Cities: Skylines series	Developer for Paradox Interactive
Compile Heart	Tokyo		Japan	2006	Hyperdimension Neptunia franchise Mary Skelter series Record of Agarest War	Developer/publisher; subsidiary of Idea Factory
Compulsion Games	Montreal	Quebec	Canada	2009	Contrast; We Happy Few; South of Midnight	Acquired by Microsoft Studios in 2018; became independent in 2026
Com2uS	Seoul		South Korea	1998	Summoners War: Sky Arena; Skylanders Ring of Heroes	Acquired by Gamevil in 2013
Com2uS Holdings (formerly Gamevil)	Seoul		South Korea	2000	Zenonia series	
Core Design	Derby	England	United Kingdom	1988	Tomb Raider series	Subsidiary of Eidos Interactive; closed down in 2006
Crafts & Meister	Osaka		Japan	2004	Gundam Breaker series	
Crawfish Interactive	Croydon	England	United Kingdom	1997		Defunct in 2002
Creat Studios	Canton	Massachusetts	United States	1990	American Chopper 2: Full Throttle; Tony Hawk's Motion	
Creative Assembly	Horsham	England	United Kingdom	1987	Total War series Alien: Isolation	Acquired by Sega in 2005
Creatures Inc.	Tokyo		Japan	1995	Pokémon Ranger series Detective Pikachu series	
Criterion Games	Guildford	England	United Kingdom	1993	Burnout series Need for Speed Unbound	Subsidiary of Electronic Arts
Croteam	Zagreb		Croatia	1993	Serious Sam series The Talos Principle series	Acquired by Devolver Digital in 2020
Cryo Interactive	Paris		France	1992	Dune; Egypt series	Bankrupt in 2002
Culture Brain Excel	Tokyo		Japan	1980	Hiryū no Ken series Super Chinese series	
Crea-Tech	Tokyo		Japan	1988	Metal Max series	
Cryptic Studios	Los Gatos	California	United States	2000	City of Heroes; Champions Online; Star Trek Online	Acquired by Atari, SA in 2008 and then acquired by Perfect World in 2011 and managed by Perfect World Entertainment, the North American subsidiary, which was acquired by Embracer Group in 2021; acquired by Project Golden Arc in 2025
Crystal Dynamics	Redwood City	California	United States	1992	Legacy Of Kain series Tomb Raider series (second era); Marvel's Avengers	Acquired by Square Enix in 2009 and then acquired by Embracer Group in 2022
Crytek	Frankfurt		Germany	1999	Far Cry; Crysis series Ryse: Son of Rome; Hunt: Showdown	
Crytek UK	Nottingham	England	United Kingdom	1999	TimeSplitters series	Founded as Free Radical Design; acquired by Crytek in 2009; defunct in 2014
Cyan Worlds	Mead	Washington	United States	1987	Myst series Obduction; Firmament; The Manhole; Cosmic Osmo; Spelunx	Oldest surviving independent game studio in the United States.
Cyanide	Nanterre		France	2000	Pro Cycling Manager series Blood Bowl series Styx series	Acquired by Bigben Interactive (latterly Nacon) in 2018
CyberConnect2	Fukuoka		Japan	1996	.hack franchise: .hack series; .hack//G.U. series; .hack//Z.E.R.O.; Naruto: Ultimate Ninja series Dragon Ball Z: Kakarot; Fuga: Melodies of Steel series Demon Slayer: Kimetsu no Yaiba series	
Cyberlore Studios (Blueline Simulations)	Northampton	Massachusetts	United States	1992	Majesty: The Fantasy Kingdom Sim	Developer of computer games
CyberStep	Tokyo		Japan	2000	GetAmped; Cosmic Break; GetAmped2; Onigiri	Developer/publisher of global online games
Cygames	Tokyo		Japan	2011	The Idolmaster Cinderella Girls series Granblue Fantasy series Shadowverse series Princess Connect! series Dragalia Lost; Umamusume: Pretty Derby franchise Little Noah series	Subsidiary of CyberAgent
Daedalic Entertainment	Hamburg		Germany	2007	Edna & Harvey series Blackguards series The Lord of the Rings: Gollum	Acquired by Bastei Lübbe in 2014 and then acquired by Nacon in 2022. The company still exists, but they exited the game development business in 2023.
Dambuster Studios	Nottingham	England	United Kingdom	2014	Homefront: The Revolution; Dead Island 2	Formed by former employees of Crytek UK; acquired by Koch Media in 2014 and managed by its Deep Silver division
Danger Close Games	Los Angeles	California	United States	1995	Medal of Honor series	Subsidiary of Electronic Arts; defunct in 2013
Daybreak Game Company	San Diego	California	United States	1997	EverQuest series PlanetSide series H1Z1 series	Acquired by Enad Global 7 in 2020.
Deadline Games	Copenhagen		Denmark	1996	Total Overdose; Watchmen: The End Is Nigh; Faith and a .45	
Deck13	Frankfurt		Germany	2001	Ankh series The Surge series	Acquired by Focus Home Interactive(currently Focus Entertainment) in 2020.
Demiurge Studios	Cambridge	Massachusetts	United States	2002	Marvel Puzzle Quest; Sega Heroes	acquired by Sega in 2015; became independent in 2020; acquired by Embracer Group in 2021
DeNA	Tokyo		Japan	1999	Final Fantasy Record Keeper; Pokémon Masters; Mario Kart Tour	
Dhruva Interactive	Bangalore		India	1997		Acquired by Starbreeze Studios in 2016 and then they were acquired by Rockstar Games and were merged into Rockstar India in 2019
Die Gute Fabrik	Copenhagen		Denmark	2006	Where is my Heart? Sportsfriends	closed in 2024
Digital Extremes	London	Ontario	Canada	1993	Warframe	Subsidiary of Leyou, which was acquired by Tencent in 2020; Founded by James Schmalz, co-creator of Unreal series.
Digital Eclipse	Emeryville	California	United States	1992	Spyro handheld series	Former division of Other Ocean Group; acquired by Atari SA in 2023
Digital Happiness	Bandung	West Java	Indonesia	2013	DreadOut series	
Digital Reality	Budapest		Hungary	1991	Imperium Galactica series	Defunct in 2013; their assets were acquired by Nordic Games
Dimps	Osaka		Japan	2000	Street Fighter IV; Crash Boom Bang! Tamagotchi Connection: Corner Shop 2-3; Dragon Ball Z: Budokai series Dragon Ball Xenoverse series Sword Art Online: Fatal Bullet	
Disney Interactive Studios	Glendale	California	United States	1988		Publisher and subsidiary of The Walt Disney Company; closed in 2016
Don Bluth Entertainment (formerly Sullivan Bluth Studios)	Dublin		Ireland	1979	Dragon's Lair II–III	Defunct in 1995
Don't Nod	Paris		France	2008	Life Is Strange series Tell Me Why	
Dotemu	Paris		France	2007	Wonder Boy: The Dragon's Trap; Streets of Rage 4	Acquired by Focus Home Interactive in 2021
Double Fine	San Francisco	California	United States	2000	Psychonauts series Broken Age; Gang Beasts	Founded by former employees of LucasArts; acquired by Microsoft in 2019; became independent in 2026
Dovetail Games	Chatham	England	United Kingdom	2008	Train Simulator franchise	Acquired by Focus Entertainment in 2023
The Dovetail Group			United States	c. 1984		Early developer of music video games
Dr. Panda	Chengdu		China	2011		Role-playing apps aimed at children ages 5 and under
Dynamix	Eugene	Oregon	United States	1984	Red Baron; Front Page Sports series Betrayal at Krondor; Tribes series MechWarrior	Closed in 2001
EA Black Box	British Columbia		Canada	1998	Skate series NHL Hitz series	Subsidiary of Electronic Arts; closed in 2013
EA Digital Illusions (EA DICE)	Stockholm		Sweden	1992	Battlefield series Mirror's Edge	Acquired by Electronic Arts in 2004
EA Gothenburg	Gothenburg		Sweden	2011	Need for Speed Payback	Subsidiary of Electronic Arts
EA Phenomic	Ingelheim am Rhein		Germany	1997	SpellForce series BattleForge; Lord of Ultima; Command and Conquer: Tiberium Alliances	Acquired by Electronic Arts in 2006; shut down in 2013
EA Salt Lake	Salt Lake City	Utah	United States	1992	Tiger Woods PGA Tour 2001–08; Littlest Pet Shop series Nerf N-Strike series Monopoly Streets	Acquired by Electronic Arts in 2006; defunct in 2017
EA Tiburon (formerly EA Orlando, Tiburon Entertainment)	Maitland	Florida	United States	1994	Madden NFL series NBA Live series (2013–); NFL Head Coach series NCAA Football/EA Sports College Football series EA Sports NASCAR series	Acquired by Electronic Arts in 1998
EA Vancouver (formerly Distinctive Software)	Burnaby	British Columbia	Canada	1982	Test Drive; SSX series NHL series NBA Live series (1994–2010); EA Sports UFC series FIFA series EA Sports FC series	Acquired by Electronic Arts in 1991
Eagle Dynamics	Villars-sur-Glâne		Switzerland	1991	Su-27 Flanker; Flanker 2.0; Lock On: Modern Air Combat; DCS World	
Eat Sleep Play	Salt Lake City	Utah	United States	2007	Twisted Metal series (2008–2012)	Defunct in 2017
Eko Software	Paris		France	1999	Handball series Rugby 18-22	Acquired by Bigben Interactive (latterly Nacon) in 2018
Egosoft	Würselen		Germany	1988	X series	
Eden Games	Lyon		France	1998	Test Drive Unlimited series	Former subsidiary of Atari SA; acquired by Engine Media in 2017 and then acquired by Animoca Brands in 2022
Eidos-Montréal	Montreal	Quebec	Canada	2007	Deus Ex series Marvel's Guardians of the Galaxy; Grounded 2	Subsidiary of Embracer Group
Eighting	Tokyo		Japan	1993	Kururin series Kamen Rider: Climax series Kamen Rider: Battride War series Marvel vs. Capcom 3: Fate of Two Worlds; Pikmin 4	Acquired by COLOPL
Electronic Arts	Redwood City	California	United States	1982	Need For Speed series Apex Legends	Developer/publisher/distributor
Elemental Games	Vladivostok		Russia	1999	Space Rangers	Defunct in 2015
Elite Systems	Lichfield	England	United Kingdom	1984	Dragon's Lair: The Legend	
Engine Software	Doetinchem		Netherlands	1995		Also middleware developer
Ensemble Studios	Dallas	Texas	United States	1995	Age of Empires series Age of Mythology; Halo Wars	Former subsidiary of Microsoft Studios
Epic Games	Cary	North Carolina	United States	1991	Unreal series Gears of War series Shadow Complex; Infinity Blade series Fortnite	Developer, publisher, and distributor
Epics	Tokyo		Japan	1987	PoPoLoCrois series	
Epicenter Studios	Sherman Oaks	California	United States	2007	Real Heroes: Firefighter	
ESA (formerly Softmax)	Seoul		South Korea	1994	TalesWeaver	ESA left from game business. The former employees formed Studio 4Leaf and the studio was acquired by NextFloor.
Eric Barone	Seattle		United States	2012	Stardew Valley	Developer/publisher
Epyx	San Francisco	California	United States	1978	California Games series Impossible Mission series Jumpman series Pitstop series Summer Games series	Developer/publisher, defunct 1993
Étranges Libellules	Lyon		France	1994	Asterix & Obelix XXL; The Legend of Spyro: Dawn of the Dragon	
Eugen Systems	Paris		France	2000	Act of War series Wargame series Steel Division series	
Eurocom	Derby	England	United Kingdom	1988	GoldenEye 007; 007 Legends; Crash Bash; Spyro: A Hero's Tail	Defunct in 2012
Evolution Studios	Runcorn	England	United Kingdom	1999	World Rally Championship series MotorStorm series	Division of SIE Worldwide Studios and subsidiary of Sony Computer Entertainment; defunct in 2016
Examu	Tokyo		Japan	2007	Arcana Heart series	Their business operations were suspended in 2020 and their business was taken over by Team Arcana.
Eyedentity Games	Seoul		South Korea	2007	Dragon Nest	Acquired by Shanda Games (currently Shengqu Games) in 2010
Facepunch Studios	Walsall	England	United Kingdom	2009	Garry's Mod; Rust	
FASA Studio	Redmond	Washington	United States	1994	MechCommander series MechWarrior 4	defunct in 2007
Fatshark	Stockholm		Sweden	2008	War of the Roses; Bionic Commando Rearmed 2 Warhammer: Vermintide series	Subsidiary of Tencent
feelplus	Tokyo		Japan	1992	No More Heroes: Heroes' Paradise	Merged into AQ Interactive
Felistella	Gifu		Japan	2010	Summon Night 5 Hyperdimension Neptunia Re; Birth series Genkai Tokki series	
Fenris Creations	Reykjavík		Iceland	1997	Eve Online	Their Newcastle studio was acquired by Sumo Digital. CCP Games itself was acquired by Pearl Abyss; became independent in 2026
Firaxis Games	Sparks	Maryland	United States	1996	Civilization series (part 3 and later); XCOM (Reboot) series Marvel's Midnight Suns	Subsidiary of 2K; founded by former employees of MicroProse.
Firefly Studios	London	England	United Kingdom	1999	Stronghold series	Acquired by Devolver Digital in 2021
Firesprite	Liverpool	England	United Kingdom	2012	Horizon Call of the Mountain; Until Dawn 2	Formed by former employees of Studio Liverpool; acquired by Sony Interactive Entertainment in 2021
First Star Software	Chappaqua	New York	United States	1982		Defunct in 2018. Their name and assets were acquired by BBG Entertainment
Flagship Studios	San Francisco	California	United States	2003	Hellgate:London; Mythos	Closed down in 2008
Flight-Plan	Gifu		Japan	1989	Black/Matrix series Summon Night series	Defunct in 2010
Flying Wild Hog	Warsaw		Poland	2009	Hard Reset; Shadow Warrior series Tomb Raider: Legacy of Atlantis	Acquired by Embracer Group in 2020.
Focus Entertainment	Paris		France	1996	Cities XL series (2011 and later)	
Foundation 9 Entertainment	Emeryville	California	United States	1992		Dissolved in 2016
Fox Digital Entertainment	Los Angeles	California	United States	2002		Subsidiary of 20th Century Studios. The company still exists, but 20th Century Fox's video game business was rearranged to FoxNext.
FoxNext	Los Angeles	California	United States	2017	Marvel Strike Force	Division of 20th Century Studios. The company still exists but their game development studios were acquired by Scopely in 2020.
Frictional Games	Helsingborg		Sweden	2001	Penumbra series Amnesia series SOMA	
Frogwares	Kyiv		Ukraine	2000	Adventures of Sherlock Holmes series The Sinking City series	
Frog City Software	San Francisco	California	United States	1994	Imperialism series Tropico 2: Pirate Cove	Acquired by Take-Two Interactive in 2003 and closed in 2006
FromSoftware	Tokyo		Japan	1986	Armored Core series Dark Souls series Bloodborne; Sekiro; Elden Ring series	Subsidiary of Kadokawa Corporation
Frontier Developments	Cambridge	England	United Kingdom	1994	Elite series Thrillville; LostWinds; Kinectimals; RollerCoaster Tycoon 3 F1 Manager series Planet Coaster series Planet Zoo; Jurassic World Evolution series	
Frozenbyte	Helsinki		Finland	2001	Shadowgrounds series Trine series	
FTL Games	San Diego	California	United States	1982	Dungeon Master series	Closed in 1982
Fun Labs	Bucharest		Romania	1999	MIB: Alien Crisis; Cabela's series	Acquired by Maximum Entertainment in 2023
Funcom	Oslo		Norway	1993	The Longest Journey series Anarchy Online; Age of Conan; The Secret World; Conan Exiles; Dune: Awakening	Developer/publisher; acquired by Tencent in 2020
FuRyu	Tokyo		Japan	2007	Unchained Blades series Beyblade Burst series Cardfight!! Vanguard series	
Futuremark	Espoo		Finland	1997	Shattered Horizon	Their game development division was acquired by Rovio Entertainment. Futuremark itself was acquired by UL and was merged into them.
Gaijin Entertainment	Budapest		Hungary	2002	War Thunder; IL-2 Sturmovik: Birds of Prey	
Game Arts	Chiyoda, Tokyo		Japan	1985	Thexder series Lunar series Grandia series	Acquired by GungHo Online Entertainment in 2005.
Game Freak	Setagaya-ku, Tokyo		Japan	1989	Pokémon franchise: Pokémon Legends series; Pocket Card Jockey series	
Game Studio	Shinagawa, Tokyo		Japan	1985	The Return of Ishtar; Infinity Strash: Dragon Quest The Adventure of Dai	
GameHouse	Seattle	Washington	United States	1998	Delicious series	Casual game developer, publisher and portal; acquired by RealNetworks
Gameloft	Paris		France	1999	Modern Combat: Domination; Order & Chaos Online; Assassin's Creed (for mobile); Asphalt	Subsidiary of Vivendi; developer/publisher of mobile games
Ganbarion	Fukuoka		Japan	1999	One Piece series Jump Super Stars series Wii Fit U Dragon Ball Fusions	
Gearbox Software	Plano	Texas	United States	1999	Brothers In Arms series Borderlands series Half-Life: Opposing Force; Risk of Rain series	Acquired by Embracer Group in 2021 and acquired by 2K in 2024
Genius Sonority	Tokyo		Japan	2002	Pokémon Colosseum series Pokémon Trozei! series The Denpa Men series	
Genki	Shinjuku, Tokyo		Japan	1990	Tokyo Xtreme Racer series	Subsidiary of Daikoku Denki
Glu Mobile	San Francisco	California	United States	2001	Deer Hunter series	Developer and publisher of mobile games; acquired by Electronic Arts in 2021
Gogii Games	Moncton	New Brunswick	Canada	2006		Developer/publisher
Good-Feel	Kobe		Japan	2005	Kirby's Epic Yarn; Yoshi's Woolly World; Yoshi's Crafted World; Yoshi and the Mysterious Book; Princess Peach: Showtime!	Founded by former employees of Konami
Goodgame Studios	Hamburg	Hamburg	Germany	2009		Developer/publisher; acquired by Stillfront Group in 2018
Granzella	Nonoichi		Japan	2011	Disaster Report 4 Plus	Founded by former Irem employees
Grasshopper Manufacture	Chiyoda, Tokyo		Japan	1998	The Silver Case; Flower, Sun, and Rain killer7 No More Heroes series Shadows of the Damned; Lollipop Chainsaw; Killer Is Dead; Let It Die	Founded by Suda51; acquired by GungHo Online Entertainment in 2013; later acquired by NetEase Games
Gravity	Seoul		South Korea	2000	Ragnarok Online	Acquired by GungHo Online Entertainment
Gray Matter Studios	Los Angeles	California	United States	1993	Call of Duty: United Offensive	Acquired by Activision in 2002; merged into Treyarch in 2005
Gremlin Interactive	Sheffield	England	United Kingdom	1984	Monopoly (1997); Zool series Premier Manager series	Taken over by Infogrames in 1999 studio closed in 2003
Grezzo	Shibuya, Tokyo		Japan	2006	The Legend of Zelda: Ocarina of Time 3D; The Legend of Zelda: Majora's Mask 3D; The Legend of Zelda: Tri Force Heroes; Ever Oasis; The Legend of Zelda: Link's Awakening (2019 Remake); The Legend of Zelda: Echoes of Wisdom	Second-party developer of Nintendo
Grin	Stockholm		Sweden	1997	Bionic Commando Rearmed; Bionic Commando (2009)	Defunct in 2009
Grinding Gear Games	Auckland		New Zealand	2006	Path of Exile series	Acquired by Tencent
Griptonite Games	Kirkland	Washington	United States	1994	Marvel Super Hero Squad: Comic Combat	Acquired by Glu Mobile and merged into the company.
GSC Game World	Kyiv		Ukraine	1995	Cossacks series, S.T.A.L.K.E.R series	Defunct in 2011, reopened in 2014
Guerrilla Cambridge	Cambridge	England	United Kingdom	1997 (as SCE Cambridge Studio), 2013	MediEvil series	Branch of Guerrilla Games and division of SIE Worldwide Studios; closed in 2017
Guerrilla Games	Amsterdam		Netherlands	2000	Killzone series Horizon series	Division of SIE Worldwide Studios since 2004
Gunfire Games	Austin	Texas	United States	2014	Darksiders series Remnant series	Formed by former employees of Vigil Games; acquired by THQ Nordic in 2019
GungHo Online Entertainment	Chiyoda, Tokyo		Japan	1998	Puzzle & Dragons series	Developer/publisher
Gust	Nagano		Japan	1993	Atelier series Blue Reflection series Fairy Tail series The Apothecary Diaries: The False Imperial Brother	Became a division of Koei Tecmo Games in 2014
Haemimont Games	Sofia		Bulgaria	1997	Tropico 3–5; Jagged Alliance 3	Acquired by Paradox Interactive in 2025
HAL Laboratory	Chiyoda, Tokyo		Japan	1980	Kirby series Earthbound/Mother series Pokémon Snap	Developer closely associated with Nintendo
Halfbrick	Brisbane	Queensland	Australia	2001	Fruit Ninja series Jetpack Joyride	Mobile game developer/publisher
Halo Studios	Redmond	Washington	United States	2009	Halo series	Subsidiary of Microsoft Studios, took over development for the Halo franchise from Bungie
Hanaho	Cerritos	California	United States	1992		
h.a.n.d.	Sapporo		Japan	1993	Aikatsu! series Kingdom Hearts 358/2 Days; Disney Magical World series Tamagotchi: Party On!	
Hangar 13	Novato	California	United States	2014	Mafia series (2014-); TopSpin 2K25	Subsidiary of 2K
Harebrained Schemes	Seattle	Washington	United States	2011	Shadowrun Returns; Shadowrun: Dragonfall; Shadowrun: Hong Kong	Acquired by Paradox Interactive in 2018; became independent in 2024
Harmonix Music Systems	Cambridge	Massachusetts	United States	1995	Guitar Hero I–II; Rock Band series Dance Central series	Former subsidiary of Viacom; acquired by Epic Games in 2021
Hazelight Studios	Stockholm		Sweden	2014	It Takes Two; Split Fiction	
Headstrong Games	London	England	United Kingdom	2000	Battalion Wars series Art Academy series	Subsidiary of Kuju Entertainment; defunct in 2017
Heartbeat	Tokyo		Japan	1992	Dragon Quest VI–VII	
Heavy Iron Studios	Manhattan Beach	California	United States	1999	SpongeBob's Truth or Square; UFC Personal Trainer; Family Guy: Back to the Multiverse	Acquired by Keywords Studios in 2020.
HB Studios	Lunenburg	Nova Scotia	Canada	2000	PGA Tour 2K series Rugby 2004–15; Rugby World Cup 2011–2015	Acquired by 2K in 2021
Hello Games	Guildford	Surrey	United Kingdom	2008	Joe Danger No Man's Sky The Last Campfire	
HexaDrive	Osaka		Japan	2007	Rez HD; Ōkami HD; Super Bomberman R	
High Impact Games	Burbank	California	United States	2003	Ratchet & Clank: Size Matters; Secret Agent Clank; Jak and Daxter: The Lost Frontier	Founded by former employees of Insomniac Games & Naughty Dog
High Moon Studios	San Diego	California	United States	2005	Transformers: War for Cybertron series Deadpool	Subsidiary of Activision
High Voltage Software	Hoffman Estates	Illinois	United States	1993	The Conduit series	Acquired by Keywords Studios in 2020.
Hothead Games	Vancouver	British Columbia	Canada	2006	DeathSpank; Swarm	Founded by former employees of Radical Entertainment
Housemarque	Helsinki		Finland	1995	Super Stardust; Returnal	Acquired by Sony Interactive Entertainment as a subsidiary of PlayStation Studios in 2021
Hudson Soft	Tokyo		Japan	1973	Bomberman series Adventure Island series Far East of Eden series Momotaro Dentetsu series Mario Party series	Developer/publisher; acquired and dissolved by Konami
Human Entertainment	Tokyo		Japan	1983	Fire Pro Wrestling series Formation Soccer series Twilight Syndrome series	
Human Head Studios	Madison	Wisconsin	United States	1997	Rune; Prey	
Humongous Entertainment	Bothell	Washington	United States	1992	Fatty Bear's Birthday Surprise; Putt-Putt series Freddi Fish series Pajama Sam series Spy Fox series Backyard Sports series	Former subsidiary of Infogrames; closed in 2006; their assets and brand were acquired by Tommo and relaunched in 2013
Hyperion Entertainment	Brussels		Belgium	1999		
Ice-Pick Lodge	Moscow		Russia	2002	Pathologic series	
id Software	Mesquite	Texas	United States	1991	Wolfenstein series Doom series Quake series Rage series	Acquired by ZeniMax Media on June 24, 2009
Idea Factory	Shibuya, Tokyo		Japan	1994	Amnesia series	Developer/publisher
ILCA	Tokyo		Japan	2010	Pokémon Brilliant Diamond and Shining Pearl; One Piece Odyssey; THE IDOLM@STER TOURS	
Idol Minds	Westminster	Colorado	United States	1997	Cool Boarders 3–4; Pain; Neopets: The Darkest Faerie; Rally Cross 2 Life Is Strange series	
Imageepoch	Tokyo		Japan	2005	Luminous Arc series Fate/Extra series	Defunct in 2016
Image & Form	Gothenburg		Sweden	1997	SteamWorld series	Subsidiary of Thunderful; merged into Thunderful Development in 2020.
Imagineer	Tokyo		Japan	1986	Shape Boxing series Fitness Boxing series	
Infinity Ward	Woodland Hills	California	United States	2002	Call of Duty series	Acquired by Activision in 2003.
Infocom	Cambridge	Massachusetts	United States	1979	Zork series Planetfall series The Hitchhiker's Guide to the Galaxy; Leather Goddesses of Phobos	Acquired by Activision in 1986; closed in 1989.
Incognito Entertainment	Salt Lake City	Utah	United States	1999	Twisted Metal series (2001–2007); Warhawk (2007)	Formed by former employees of SingleTrac; subsidiary of SCE Worldwide Studios; defunct in 2009
Incredible Technologies	Arlington Heights	Illinois	United States	1985	Golden Tee Golf	Defunct in 2016; arcade game designer, arcade game manufacturer
indieszero	Musashino		Japan	1997	Cooking Guide: Can't Decide What to Eat? Theatrhythm series Kingdom Hearts: Melody of Memory; Dr Kawashima's Brain Training for Nintendo Switch; Big Brain Academy: Brain vs. Brain	
Innerloop Studios	Oslo		Norway	1996	Project I.G.I. series	Defunct in 2003
Insomniac Games	Burbank	California	United States	1994	Spyro the Dragon series Ratchet & Clank series Resistance series Sunset Overdrive; Marvel's Spider-Man series	Acquired by Sony Interactive Entertainment in 2019 as a division of SIE Worldwide Studios.
Intelligent Systems	Tokyo		Japan	1986	Fire Emblem franchise Advance Wars series Paper Mario series Puzzle League series	Developer closely associated with Nintendo
Interplay Entertainment	Beverly Hills	California	United States	1983	Earthworm Jim series ClayFighter series Wasteland; Fallout series The Bard's Tale series	Developer/publisher
Inti Creates	Ichikawa, Chiba		Japan	1996	Mega Man Zero series Mega Man ZX series Gunvolt franchise: Azure Striker Gunvolt series; Gunvolt Chronicles series; Gal Gun series Bloodstained: Curse of the Moon series Blaster Master Zero trilogy Dragon Marked for Death; Gal Guardians: Demon Purge; Mighty Gunvolt series Mega Man 9 Mega Man 10	
Introversion Software	London	England	United Kingdom	2002	Darwinia; DEFCON	
inXile Entertainment	Newport Beach	California	United States	2002	Wasteland 2 The Bard's Tale IV: Barrows Deep	Founded by one of Interplay Entertainment founders; acquired by Microsoft Studios in 2018
IO Interactive	Copenhagen		Denmark	1998	Hitman series 007 First Light	Subsidiary of Square Enix until 2017 when they dropped IO, they then became independent
Ion Storm	Dallas	Texas	United States	1996	Daikatana; Anachronox	Shut down in 2001; subsidiary of Eidos Interactive
Ion Storm Austin	Austin	Texas	United States	1997	Deus Ex; Thief: Deadly Shadows	Shut down in 2005; subsidiary of Eidos Interactive
Irem	Hakusan		Japan	1974	R-Type series Disaster Report 1–3	Subsidiary of Eizo
Iron Galaxy Studios	Chicago	Illinois	United States	2008	Divekick; Borderlands 2 (PSVita); Tony Hawk's Pro Skater 3 + 4	
Iron Lore Entertainment	Maynard	Massachusetts	United States	2000	Titan Quest series Warhammer 40,000: Dawn of War – Soulstorm	Defunct in 2008
Irrational Games	Quincy	Massachusetts	United States	1996	System Shock 2 Freedom Force series BioShock series	Subsidiary of 2K; defunct in 2017. Their main employees moved to Ghost Story Games.
Ivory Tower	Lyon		France	2007	The Crew series	Subsidiary of Ubisoft; founded by former employees of Eden Games
Jackbox Games	Chicago	Illinois	United States	1989	The Jackbox Party Pack series	
Jagex	Cambridge	England	United Kingdom	2001	RuneScape series	Subsidiary of CVC Capital Partners; online game developer
Jaleco	Tokyo		Japan	1974	Idol Janshi Suchie-Pai series	Acquired by Game Yarou in 2009 and defunct in 2014
Jam City	Los Angeles	California	United States	2007	Harry Potter: Hogwarts Mystery	Former subsidiary of Netmarble; mobile game developer
Japan Studio	Tokyo		Japan	1993	Ape Escape series Ico; Shadow of the Colossus; Siren series Patapon series Loco Roco series Gravity Rush series Knack series The Last Guardian; Fantavision	Former division of SIE Worldwide Studios, re-organized into Team Asobi in 2021
Javaground	Irvine	Massachusetts	United States	2001	God of War: Betrayal	Mobile game developer
JOY Entertainment	Ho Chi Minh City		Vietnam	2012	Captain Strike	Mobile game developer
Jupiter	Kyoto		Japan	1996	Picross series Pokémon Pinball series	
JV Games	Las Vegas	Nevada	United States	1999		
Kairosoft	Tokyo		Japan	1996	Game Dev Story	
Kalypso Media	Worms		Germany	2006	Tropico series	Developer/publisher
Kaos Studios	New York City	New York	United States	2006	Frontlines: Fuel of War; Homefront	Subsidiary of THQ
Keen Software House	Prague		Czech Republic	2010	Space Engineers series	
Kesmai	Charlottesville	Virginia	United States	1981	Island of Kesmai	Subsidiary of Electronic Arts; closed in 2001
Kiloo Games	Aarhus		Denmark	2000	Subway Surfers; Frisbee Forever	Mobile game developer; closed in 2023
King	Stockholm		Sweden	2003	Candy Crush series	Subsidiary of Activision Blizzard; Mobile game developer
Klei Entertainment	Vancouver	British Columbia	Canada	2005	Shank series Don't Starve	Acquired by Tencent in 2021.
Koei Tecmo Games (formerly Koei)	Ashikaga		Japan	1978	Warriors franchise: Dynasty Warriors series; Samurai Warriors series; Warriors Orochi series; Trilogy of Histories franchise: Nobunaga's Ambition series; Romance of the Three Kingdoms series; Genghis Khan series; Ninja Gaiden series Dead or Alive franchise Nioh series Haruka series Fire Emblem: Three Houses	Developer/publisher; subsidiary of Koei Tecmo Holdings
KOG Studios	Seoul		South Korea	2000	Elsword; Grand Chase series	
Kojima Productions	Shinagawa,Tokyo		Japan	2005	Death Stranding series	Originally a Konami subsidiary until 2015, when it was closed and subsequently re-established as an independent studio.
Konami	Tokyo Midtown; Minato		Japan	1969	Gradius series Contra series Metal Gear series Castlevania series Survival Kids franchise: Lost in Blue; Pro Evolution Soccer series Silent Hill series TwinBee series Bemani series Power Pros series Professional Baseball Spirits series Ganbare Goemon series Tokimeki Memorial series LovePlus series Suikoden series Bombergirl series Shine Post	Developer/publisher
Kongzhong	Beijing		China	2002		
Krome Studios	Brisbane	Queensland	Australia	1999	The Legend of Spyro series Ty the Tasmanian Tiger series	
Krome Studios Melbourne	Melbourne	Victoria	Australia	1988	Horace series	Defunct
Kuju Entertainment	Shalford	England	United Kingdom	1998	Microsoft Train Simulator; Art Academy series Zumba Fitness 2– Top Gun: Hard Lock	Subsidiary of Catalis SE
Kunos Simulazioni	Rome		Italy	2005	Assetto Corsa series	Subsidiary of Digital Bros
Kush Games	Camarillo	California	United States	1998		
Kuma Reality Games	New York City	New York	United States	2003		
Kylotonn	Paris		France	2002	WRC 5– V-Rally 4 Test Drive Unlimited Solar Crown	Acquired by Bigben Interactive (latterly Nacon) in 2018
Larian Studios	Oudenaarde		Belgium	1996	Divinity series Baldur's Gate III	
Left Field Productions	Ventura	California	United States	1994	Excitebike 64	closed in 2011
Legacy Games	Los Angeles	California	United States	1998	Emergency Room series	
Legend Entertainment	Chantilly	Virginia	United States	1989	Spellcasting series Superhero League of Hoboken; The Wheel of Time; Unreal II	Closed in 2004.
Legendo Entertainment	Gothenburg		Sweden	2004		Developer/publisher; closed in 2026
Lesta Studio (formerly Wargaming Saint Petersburg)	Saint Petersburg		Russia	1991	World of Warships	Former subsidiary of Wargaming; acquired by JSC "Industrial Structures" in 2026.
Level-5	Fukuoka		Japan	1998	Dark Cloud series Rogue Galaxy; Professor Layton series Inazuma Eleven series Ni no Kuni series Yo-Kai Watch franchise Fantasy Life series The Snack World; Megaton Musashi series Dragon Quest VIII–IX	Developer/publisher and founded by Akihiro Hino
Lift London	London	England	United Kingdom	2012	videogame developer for Microsoft Hololens	Subsidiary by Microsoft Studios in 2018
Limbic Entertainment	Langen		Germany	2002	Might & Magic X: Legacy; Might & Magic Heroes VII; Tropico 6 Park Beyond	Formerly a subsidiary of Bandai Namco
Lionhead Studios	Guildford	England	United Kingdom	1997	Black & White series Fable series	Closed by Microsoft Studios in 2016
Liquid Entertainment	Pasadena	California	United States	1999	Battle Realms	Dissolved in 2018
Little Green Men Games	Zagreb		Croatia	2006	Starpoint Gemini series	
LK Avalon	Świlcza, Rzeszów		Poland	1989	Hans Kloss; Schizm: Mysterious Journey	
Llamasoft	Reading	England	United Kingdom	1982		
Linden Lab	San Francisco	California	United States	1999	Second Life	
Locomotive Games	Santa Clara	California	United States	1997	Jet Moto 3	Defunct in 2008
London Studio	London	England	United Kingdom	2002	SingStar series	Division of SIE Worldwide Studios; closed in 2024
Looking Glass Studios	Cambridge	Massachusetts	United States	1990	Ultima Underworld series System Shock series Thief series	
Love-de-Lic	Tokyo		Japan	1995	Moon: Remix RPG Adventure	Formed by former employees of Square
LucasArts	San Francisco	California	United States	1982	Maniac Mansion; Sam & Max Hit the Road; Day of the Tentacle; Monkey Island series The Dig; Full Throttle; Grim Fandango; Star Wars: The Force Unleashed series Star Wars: Battlefront series	Publisher and former developer; closed as developer of April 3, 2013 by Disney
Luma Arcade	Johannesburg		South Africa	2006		Division of Luma Animation
Luxoflux	Santa Monica	California	United States	1998	True Crime series Vigilante 8 series	Acquired by Activision in 2002; defunct in 2010
MachineGames	Uppsala		Sweden	2009	Wolfenstein series Indiana Jones and the Great Circle	Founded by former employees of Starbreeze Studios; acquired by ZeniMax Media in 2010.
Magenta Software	Liverpool	England	United Kingdom	1994	Buzz! Junior series	
MAGES.	Shibuya, Tokyo		Japan	2005	Science Adventure franchise: Steins;Gate series; Robotics;Notes series; Chaos;Child series; Corpse Party series(2010–)	Acquired by COLOPL in 2020. Former subsidiary of Dwango.
Majesco	Edison	New Jersey	United States	1986		Defunct December 8, 2016
Marvelous	Shibuya, Tokyo		Japan	1997	Senran Kagura series Soul Sacrifice series Story of Seasons series Rune Factory series Fate/Extella series Daemon X Machina series Kandagawa Jet Girls; Super Monkey Ball: Banana Splitz	Developer/publisher
Massive Entertainment	Malmö		Sweden	1997	Ground Control; World In Conflict; Tom Clancy's The Division series Avatar: Frontiers of Pandora; Star Wars Outlaws	Founded in 1997; acquired by Vivendi Universal Games in 2002 and then acquired by Ubisoft in 2008
Masthead Studios	Sofia		Bulgaria	2005	Earthrise	
Matrix Software	Tokyo		Japan	1994	Omega Labyrinth series Lost in Blue 2–3; Brigandine: The Legend of Runersia	
Maxis	Emeryville	California	United States	1987	The Sims series SimCity series	Became a subsidiary of Electronic Arts in 1997
Mean Hamster Software	Deer Park	Washington	United States	1985		
Media Molecule	Guildford	England	United Kingdom	2006	LittleBigPlanet series Tereaway series	Founded by former employees of Lionhead Studios; division of SIE Worldwide Studios since 2010
Media.Vision	Tokyo		Japan	1993	Wild Arms series Chaos Rings series Digimon Story: Cyber Sleuth/Time Stranger; Summon Night 6	
Mediatonic	London	England	United Kingdom	2005	Robot Unicorn Attack; Fable Fortune	Subsidiary of Tonic Games Group, which was acquired by Epic Games in 2021
MegaZebra	Munich		Germany	2009		
Mercury Steam	Madrid		Spain	2002	Castlevania: Lords of Shadow series Metroid: Samus Returns Metroid Dread	
Metropolis Software	Warsaw		Poland	1992	Teenagent; Gorky 17; Infernal	Studio was bought by CD Projekt in 2008 and closed in 2009.
MicroProse Software	Hunt Valley	Maryland	United States	1982	Silent Service; Gunship; Pirates! Railroad Tycoon; Civilization series	
Microsoft Casual Games	Redmond	Washington	United States	2013	Solitaire; Mahjong; Minesweeper; Wordament	Division of Microsoft
Midway Games	Chicago	Illinois	United States	1988	Mortal Kombat series NFL Blitz series	As of 2012, Midway is a corporation existing under Delaware law subject to a Chapter 11 bankruptcy liquidation plan
Midway Studios – Newcastle	Gateshead	England	United Kingdom	1996	Test Drive 4–6	Defunct in 2009
Might and Delight	Stockholm		Sweden	2010	Shelter series	Formed by former employees of Grin
miHoYo	Shanghai		China	2012	Honkai series Tears of Themis; Genshin Impact; Zenless Zone Zero	Developer and publisher; founded by Cai Haoyu, Liu Wei, and Luo Yuhao, three former students from Shanghai Jiao Tong University
Milestone	Suginami, Tokyo		Japan	2003	Chaos Field series	
Milestone srl	Milan		Italy	1996	Superbike series MotoGP series WRC 1–4; MXGP series Ride series Monster Energy Supercross series Hot Wheels Unleashed series Monster Jam Showdown	Acquired by Koch Media in 2019
Millennium Kitchen	Tokyo		Japan	1997	Boku no Natsuyasumi series Natsu-Mon	
Mimimi Games	Munich		Germany	2011	Desperados III	the studio was closed in 2023
Minakuchi Engineering	Kōka		Japan	1984	Solar Striker; Mega Man series	Exact fate unknown. Defunct in 2002 (estimated)
Mistwalker	Tokyo		Japan	2004	Blue Dragon	
Mitchell Corporation	Tokyo		Japan	1960	Polarium; Puzz Loop series	
MLB Advanced Media	New York City	New York	United States	2000	R.B.I. Baseball 17–	
Mode 7 Games	Brighton	East Sussex	United Kingdom	2005	Frozen Synapse series Tokyo 42	The company still exists, but they exited the game development business in 2019.
Mojang AB	Stockholm		Sweden	2009	Minecraft series Scrolls	Former Indie developer and publisher; acquired by Microsoft on September 15, 2014
Monolith Productions	Kirkland	Washington	United States	1994	F.E.A.R. series Middle-earth: Shadow of Mordor Middle-earth: Shadow of War	Acquired by Warner Bros. Interactive Entertainment in 2004; closed in 2025
Monolith Soft	Tokyo		Japan	1999	Xenosaga series Baten Kaitos series Xenoblade series Project X Zone series	Founded by Tetsuya Takahashi and former subsidiary of Namco; acquired by Nintendo as a first-party developer and subsidiary in 2007
Monster Games	Northfield	Minnesota	United States	1996	NASCAR Heat series Excite Truck; Pilotwings Resort	Acquired by iRacing.com Motorsport Simulations in 2022
Monte Cristo	Paris		France	1995	City Life series Cities XL	Defunct in 2010
Moonton	Shanghai		China	2015	Mobile Legends: Bang Bang	Acquired by Bytedance in 2021
Moon Studios	Vienna		Austria	2010	Ori series	
Motion Twin	Bordeaux		France	2001	Dead Cells	
Motive Studio	Montreal		Canada	2015	Star Wars: Squadrons; Dead Space (2023); Marvel's Iron Man	Subsidiary of Electronic Arts
MTO	Yokohama		Japan	1996	GT Advance series	
Mythic Entertainment	Fairfax	Virginia	United States	1995	Dark Age of Camelot	Acquired by Electronic Arts in 2006 and closed in 2014
Nadeo	Paris		France	2000	TrackMania series	Acquired by Ubisoft in 2009
Namco Tales Studio	Tokyo		Japan	1986	Tales series	Originally it was division or subsidiary of Telenet Japan but it became a jointly owned company of Namco and Telenet Japan
NanaOn-Sha	Tokyo		Japan	1993	PaRappa the Rapper series Tamagotchi Connection: Corner Shop	
Nanobit	Zagreb		Croatia	2008		Acquired by Stillfront Group in 2020
NAPS team	Messina		Italy	1993	Gekido series Baldo: The Guardian Owls	NAPS team is the oldest Italian development studio
Natsume Atari	Shinjuku, Tokyo		Japan	1987	Metabots series Tony Hawk's Pro Skater (GBC version); Pocky and Rocky series	
Natsume Inc.	Burlingame, California		United States	1988	Harvest Moon series Reel Fishing; River King	
NaturalMotion	London	England	United Kingdom	2001	Backbreaker series CSR Racing series Star Wars: Hunters	Acquired by Zynga
Naughty Dog	Santa Monica	California	United States	1986	Crash Bandicoot 1–3; Crash Team Racing; Jak and Daxter series Uncharted series The Last of Us series Intergalactic: The Heretic Prophet	Division of SIE Worldwide Studios since 2001
NCSoft	Seoul		South Korea	1997	Aion; Lineage series Blade & Soul series	Online game developer/publisher
NDOORS Corporation	Seoul		South Korea	1999	Atlantica Online	Developer/publisher; subsidiary of Nexon; merged into Nexon Red in 2017
Neko Entertainment	Montreuil-sous-Bois		France	1998	Cocoto; The Mysterious Cities of Gold: Secret Paths; Kung Fu Rabbit; Puddle	Developer/publisher; defunct in 2017
NetDevil	Louisville	Colorado	United States	1997	LEGO Universe	
NetDragon Websoft	Fuzhou		China	1999	Disney Fantasy Online	
NetEase	Guangzhou		China	1997	Fantasy Westward Journey; Cyber Hunter; Identity V Rules of Survival; Marvel Duel; Marvel Super War; Revelation Online; Destiny: Rising	Developer, publisher, and online services company
NetherRealm Studios	Chicago	Illinois	United States	2010	Mortal Kombat series Injustice franchise	Successor to Midway Games; Subsidiary of Warner Bros. Interactive Entertainment
Neverland	Tokyo		Japan	1993	Rune Factory series	
Neversoft	Woodland Hills	California	United States	1994	Guitar Hero III–Metallica; Tony Hawk series: Tony Hawk's Pro Skater 1–4; Tony Hawk's Underground series; Gun	Acquired by Activision in 1999; merged into Infinity Ward in 2014
New World Computing	Agoura Hills	California	United States	1984	Might and Magic franchise: Heroes of Might and Magic series	
New World Interactive	Denver	Colorado	United States	2010	Insurgency series	Acquired by Saber Interactive in 2020
Nexon	Tokyo; Seoul		Japan; South Korea	2002; 1994	MapleStory series Mabinogi; Vindictus; Atlantica Online; ARC Raiders	Online video game developer, publisher and distributor; moved its headquarters from Korea to Japan.
Next Level Games	Vancouver	British Columbia	Canada	2002	Super Mario Strikers series Luigi's Mansion: Dark Moon; Luigi's Mansion 3 Spider-Man: Friend or Foe	Acquired by Nintendo in 2021.
Niantic	San Francisco	California	United States	2010	Ingress; Pokémon Go; Harry Potter: Wizards Unite; Monster Hunter Now	
Nibris	Kraków		Poland	2000		
Nicalis	Santa Ana	California	United States	2007	VVVVVV; Cave Story; NightSky; 1001 Spikes; The Binding of Isaac series Crystal Crisis	Indie developer/publisher
Night School Studio	Glendale	California	United States	2014	Oxenfree series Afterparty	Acquired by Netflix in 2021; will be closed in 2026
Nihon Falcom	Tokyo		Japan	1981	Ys series Dragon Slayer series Xanadu franchise: Tokyo Xanadu; The Legend of Heroes franchise: Trails series	Developer/publisher
Nikita Online	St. Petersburg		Russia	1991		merged into Astrum Online Entertainment in 2007
Nimble Giant Entertainment	Buenos Aires		Argentina	2002	Regnum Online; Master of Orion: Conquer the Stars; Star Trek: Infinite	Acquired by Embracer Group in 2020.
Ninjabee	Orem	Utah	United States	2005	Keflings series	Division of Wahoo Studios
Ninja Theory	Cambridge	England	United Kingdom	2000	Heavenly Sword; Enslaved: Odyssey to the West; DmC: Devil May Cry; Hellblade series	Former Indie developer and publisher; acquired by Microsoft Studios in 2018
Nintendo	Kyoto		Japan	1889	Donkey Kong franchise Super Mario franchise The Legend of Zelda franchise Pokémon franchise Fire Emblem franchise Splatoon series Metroid franchise Kid Icarus series Pikmin series Xenoblade series Animal Crossing series F-Zero series Star Fox series Kirby franchise Mother series Super Smash Bros. series Tomodachi series Brain Age series Big Brain Academy series Nintendogs series Wave Race series Famicom Detective Club series Excitebike; Pilotwings; Tetris Attack series Wii Sports series 1-2-Switch series	First-party developer/publisher/console manufacturer
Nintendo Cube	Tokyo		Japan	2000	Wii Party series Mario Party series Clubhouse Games: 51 Worldwide Classics	Subsidiary of Nintendo
Nintendo Software Technology	Redmond	Washington	United States	1998	Bionic Commando: Elite Forces; Wave Race: Blue Storm; Mario vs. Donkey Kong series	Subsidiary of Nintendo
Nippon Ichi Software	Kakamigahara		Japan	1991	Rhapsody: A Musical Adventure; La Pucelle: Tactics; Disgaea series Phantom Brave series GrimGrimoire; Hotaru no Nikki	Developer/publisher
Nival	St. Petersburg		Russia	1996	Etherlords series Blitzkrieg series Heroes of Might and Magic V Prime World series	
NMK			Japan	1985	Hacha Mecha Fighter; Thunder Dragon; Zed Blade	defunct 1999, acquired by Hamster Corporation in 2017
Nordeus	Belgrade		Serbia	2009	Top Eleven Football Manager	Developer/publisher; acquired by Take-Two Interactive in 2021
NovaLogic	Agoura Hills	California	United States	1985	Delta Force series Joint Operations series	Their assets were acquired by THQ Nordic
Novarama	Barcelona		Spain	2003	Invizimals series	closed in 2024
Now Production	Osaka		Japan	1986	Mario Super Sluggers; Sonic Riders; Pac-Man Museum+ Pac-Man World Re-Pac series	
Nude Maker	Tokyo		Japan	2002	Steel Battalion series Infinite Space; NightCry	Formed by former employees of Human Entertainment
NuFX	Hoffman Estates	Illinois	United States	1990		Merged into EA Chicago in 2004
n-Space	Orlando	Florida	United States	1994	Heroes of Ruin; Port for various video games, include Call of Duty series	
Obsidian Entertainment	Irvine	California	United States	2004	Fallout New Vegas; Neverwinter Nights 2 Dungeon Siege III; South Park: The Stick of Truth; Pillars of Eternity; The Outer Worlds series Grounded series	Acquired by Microsoft Studios in 2018
Ocean Software	Manchester	England	United Kingdom	1983	The Addams Family series Top Gun (1986)	defunct in 1998
Oddworld Inhabitants	San Luis Obispo	California	United States	1994	Oddworld series	
Omega Force	Ashikaga		Japan	1997	Warriors franchise: Dynasty Warriors series; Dynasty Warriors: Gundam series; Samurai Warriors series; Warriors Orochi series; One Piece: Pirate Warriors series; Hyrule Warriors; Fire Emblem Warriors; Toukiden series Dragon Quest Heroes series Dragon Quest Builders 2 Persona 5 Strikers; Pokémon Pokopia	Division of Koei Tecmo Games
Origin Systems	Austin	Texas	United States	1983	Ultima series Ultima Online; Wing Commander series	Acquired by Electronic Arts in 1992 and closed in 2004
OtherSide Entertainment	Boston	Massachusetts	United States	2013	Underworld Ascendant; System Shock 3	Founded by one of Looking Glass Studios founders.
Outfit7	Ljubljana		Slovenia	2010	Talking Tom and Friends franchise	Acquired by Zhejiang Jinke Entertainment Culture Co., Ltd. in 2017
Outrage Entertainment	Ann Arbor	Michigan	United States	1996	Descent 3	Closed in 2004
Out of the Park Developments	Hollern-Twielenfleth		Germany	1999	Out of the Park Baseball series	Acquired by Com2uS in 2020
Overkill Software	Stockholm		Sweden	2009	Payday series	Founded by Grin founders; acquired by Starbreeze Studios in 2012
Oxygen Studios	Croydon	England	United Kingdom	2006	King of Clubs	
Page 44 Studios	San Francisco	California	United States	1998	Freekstyle; High School Musical 3: Senior Year Dance; Madden NFL 11 iOS uDraw Pictionary; World of Goo iOS	Subsidiary of Zynga; closed in 2011.
Pangea Software	Austin	Texas	United States	1987		
Paradigm Entertainment	Farmers Branch	Texas	United States	1997	F-1 World Grand Prix series Pilotwings 64	Acquired by Infogrames Entertainment SA in 2000; acquired by THQ in 2006; closed in 2008
People Can Fly	Warsaw		Poland	2002	Bulletstorm; Painkiller; Gears of War: E-Day	
Project Sora	Tokyo		Japan	2009	Kid Icarus: Uprising	Subsidiary of Nintendo; became defunct in 2012
Purple Lamp Studios	Vienna		Austria	2018	SpongeBob SquarePants: Battle for Bikini Bottom – Rehydrated; Epic Mickey: Rebrushed	Acquired by Embracer Group in 2020.
Project Soul	Tokyo		Japan	1996	Soul series	Division of Bandai Namco Studios
Panther Games Pty Ltd	Canberra		Australia	1985	Fire-Brigade; Command Ops: Battles from the Bulge	
Paradox Development Studio	Stockholm		Sweden	1995	Europa Universalis series Hearts of Iron series Victoria series Crusader Kings series	In-house development studio and subsidiary of Paradox Interactive
Parallax Software	Ann Arbor	Michigan	United States	1993	Descent series	Split into Volition and Outrage Entertainment
Pandemic Studios	Los Angeles	California	United States	1998	Star Wars: Battlefront; Destroy All Humans! series Full Spectrum Warrior; Mercenaries: Playground of Destruction; The Saboteur	Acquired by Electronic Arts in 2007 and closed in 2009.
Pendulo Studios	Madrid		Spain	1993	Hollywood Monsters series Runaway series Yesterday series	closed in 2025
Penguin Software	Geneva	Illinois	United States	1978	Transylvania series	
Perfect World	Beijing		China	2004	Perfect World series Final Fantasy Awakening; Persona 5: The Phantom X	Developer/publisher
Petroglyph	Las Vegas	Nevada	United States	2003	Star Wars: Empire at War; Universe at War: Earth Assault; Grey Goo; Command & Conquer Remastered Collection	
Phantagram	Seoul		South Korea	1994	Kingdom Under Fire series	Acquired by Blueside in 2010
Pipeworks Studios	Eugene	Oregon	United States	1999	Godzilla: Destroy All Monsters Melee; Deadliest Warrior; Zumba Fitness	Acquired by Sumo Group in 2020, acquired by Jagex in 2022, and acquired by Virtuos in 2025
Piranha Bytes	Essen		Germany	1997	Gothic 1–3; Risen series ELEX	Acquired by THQ Nordic in 2019; closed in 2024
Piranha Games	Vancouver	British Columbia	Canada	2000	MechWarrior 5 MechWarrior Online; Bass Pro Shops: The Strike; Die Hard: Nakatomi Plaza	Acquired by Enad Global 7 in 2020.
Pivotal Games	Bath	England	United Kingdom	2000	Conflict series The Great Escape	
Pixel Federation	Bratislava		Slovakia	2007	Galactic Junk League	Developer/Publisher
Playdom	San Francisco	California	United States	2009		Facebook, Myspace game developer Subsidiary of The Walt Disney Company; closed in 2016
Playfish	London	England	United Kingdom	2007	The Sims Social	Facebook, Myspace game developer Acquired by Electronic Arts; closed in 2013
PlayFirst	San Francisco	California	United States	2004		Acquired by Glu Mobile in 2014; Casual game developer, publisher and portal
Playground Games	Royal Leamington Spa	England	United Kingdom	2009	Forza Horizon series Fable (2026)	Acquired by Microsoft Studios in 2018
PlayStation Studios	Tokyo, Fukuoka, Santa Monica, Los Angeles, San Diego, Bend, Amsterdam, London, Guildford, Cambridge	California, Washington, Oregon, England	Japan, United States, Netherlands, United Kingdom	2005		A group of first-party development studios and subsidiaries owned by Sony Interactive Entertainment
PlatinumGames	Osaka		Japan	2006	MadWorld; Bayonetta series Vanquish; Anarchy Reigns; Metal Gear Rising: Revengeance; The Wonderful 101; Star Fox Zero; Nier: Automata; Astral Chain; Ninja Gaiden 4	Successor to Clover Studio, and founded by Shinji Mikami, Atsushi Inaba, and Hideki Kamiya.
Polyphony Digital	Tokyo		Japan	1998	Gran Turismo series Tourist Trophy	Division of SIE Worldwide Studios
PopCap Games	Seattle	Washington	United States	2000	Bejeweled series Plants vs. Zombies series Peggle series Zuma	Casual game developer, publisher and portal; subsidiary of Electronic Arts since 2011
PopTop Software	Fenton	Missouri	United States	1993	Tropico; Railroad Tycoon series	Acquired by Take-Two Interactive in 2000 and merged into Firaxis Games in 2006
Press Play	Copenhagen		Denmark	2006	Max & the Magic Marker; Max: The Curse of Brotherhood	Former subsidiary of Microsoft Studios; defunct in March 2016
Private Division	New York City	New York	United States	2017	Kerbal Space Program 2	Former subsidiary of Take-Two Interactive. The company still exists, but their game development studios, Intercept Games studio and Roll7 studio, were closed in 2024.
Psyonix	San Diego	California	United States	2001	Rocket League series XCOM: Enemy Unknown	Acquired by Epic Games in 2019
PUBG Studios	Seongnam		South Korea	2009	Devilian; PlayerUnknown's Battlegrounds	Acquired by Bluehole (currently Krafton) in 2015
Punch Entertainment	Hanoi		Vietnam	2005		Subsidiary of Evolable Asia; Casual games, social games developer
Pyro Mobile	Madrid		Spain	1996	Commandos series	Subsidiary of Zed Group; their assets were acquired by Kalypso Media
Q Entertainment	Tokyo		Japan	2003	Lumines series	Acquired by Sanyo Kasei Seisakusho in 2013 and the parent company was defunct in 2018.
Q-Games	Nakagyō-ku		Japan	2001	Star Fox Command; PixelJunk series The Tomorrow Children	
Quantic Dream	Paris		France	1997	Fahrenheit; Heavy Rain; Beyond: Two Souls; Detroit: Become Human	Acquired by NetEase in 2022
Quest Corporation	Tokyo		Japan	1988	Ogre Battle series	The game development division was acquired by Square in 2002
Quintet	Tokyo		Japan	1989	ActRaiser; Soul Blazer; Illusion of Gaia; Terranigma; Robotrek	The company appears to have been inactive since 2002. According to Terranigma artist Kamui Fujiwara, Quintet president Tomoyoshi Miyazaki had "disappeared" to his knowledge. A remaster of ActRaiser entitled ActRaiser Renaissance was released in September 2021 by Square Enix, suggesting that Square Enix at least has access to ActRaiser's rights, and might have the rest of Quintet's library as well.
Radical Entertainment	Vancouver		Canada	1991	Prototype series Mario Is Missing! Crash Tag Team Racing; Crash of the Titans	Acquired by Vivendi Games in 2005; dissolved in 2013
Rage Games	Liverpool	England	United Kingdom	1992	Incoming series	Defunct in 2003
Rainbow Studios	Phoenix	Arizona	United States	1986	MX vs. ATV series Monster Jam Steel Titans series	Acquired by THQ, later closed by THQ, but re-instated in 2013 by Nordic Games (later known as THQ Nordic); became independent in 2024
Rare	Twycross	England	United Kingdom	1985	Battletoads series Donkey Kong Country series Killer Instinct series Banjo-Kazooie series Donkey Kong 64; GoldenEye 007; Conker's Bad Fur Day; Perfect Dark series Kinect Sports series Sea of Thieves	Successor to Ultimate Play the Game; second-party developer for Nintendo; turned; Acquired by Microsoft Studios in 2002 as a first-party developer
Raven Software	Middleton	Wisconsin	United States	1990	Heretic; Hexen; Singularity; Call of Duty series Star Wars Jedi Knight II: Jedi Outcast; Soldier of Fortune II: Double Helix; Marvel: Ultimate Alliance	Acquired by Activision in 1997
RDI Video Systems	Carlsbad	California	United States	1982	Dragon's Lair	Defunct in 1985
Ready at Dawn	Irvine	California	United States	2003	Daxter; The Order: 1886; Deformers; Lone Echo	Formed by former members of Naughty Dog and Blizzard Entertainment. Acquired by Facebook in 2020. Closed in 2024.
Red Entertainment	Tokyo		Japan	1976 (as the Red Company), 2000 (as Red Entertainment)	Sakura Wars series Gungrave series	Developer/publisher; acquired by Oizumi Corporation in 2014
Reality Pump Studios	Kraków		Poland	1995	Two Worlds series	Division of TopWare Interactive
Realtime Associates	Los Angeles	California	United States	1986		
Realtime Worlds	Dundee	Scotland	United Kingdom	2002	Crackdown	Closed in 2010
Rebel Wolves	Warsaw		Poland	2022		
Rebellion Developments	Oxford	England	United Kingdom	1992	Aliens vs. Predator series Sniper Elite series	
Rebellion Warwick	Leamington Spa	England	United Kingdom	2013	SkySaga: Infinite Isles	Formed by former employees of Blitz Games Studios; acquired by Rebellion Developments in 2018
RedLynx	Helsinki		Finland	2000	Trials series	Subsidiary of Ubisoft
Red Thread Games	Oslo		Norway	2012	Dreamfall Chapters: The Longest Journey	Founded by former employees of Funcom
Red Storm Entertainment	Cary	North Carolina	United States	1996	Tom Clancy's Ghost Recon; Tom Clancy's Rainbow Six; Assassin's Creed Nexus VR	Support studio. Acquired by Ubisoft in 2000.
RedTribe (Tribalant)	Melbourne	Victoria	Australia	2003		
Reflexive Entertainment	Lake Forest	California	United States	1997	Airport Mania series	Subsidiary of Amazon.com
Relic Entertainment	Vancouver	British Columbia	Canada	1997	Company of Heroes series Warhammer 40000: Dawn of War series Homeworld series	Acquired by Sega in 2013; became independent in 2024
Remedy Entertainment	Espoo		Finland	1995	Max Payne series Alan Wake series Control	
Respawn Entertainment	Sherman Oaks, Los Angeles	California	United States	2010	Titanfall series Apex Legends; Star Wars Jedi series	Acquired by Electronic Arts in 2017.
Reto-Moto	Copenhagen		Denmark	2008	Heroes & Generals	The business was acquired by TLM Partners in 2022
Retro Studios	Austin	Texas	United States	1998	Metroid Prime series Donkey Kong Country series	First-party developer and subsidiary of Nintendo
Revolution Software	York	England	United Kingdom	1990	Broken Sword series Beneath a Steel Sky	
Riot Games	Santa Monica	California	United States	2006	League of Legends Legends of Runeterra Valorant	Acquired by Tencent in 2011
Rising Star Games	Luton	England	United Kingdom	2004		Acquired by Thunderful in 2018
Robomodo	Chicago	Illinois	United States	2008	Tony Hawk's Pro Skater HD; Tony Hawk's Pro Skater 5	Defunct in 2016
Robot Entertainment	Plano	Texas	United States	2009	Orcs Must Die! series Hero Academy series Age of Empires Online	
Rockstar Games; Rockstar India; Rockstar Leeds; Rockstar Lincoln; Rockstar London; Rockstar New England; Rockstar North; Rockstar San Diego; Rockstar Toronto	New York City; Bangalore; Leeds; Lincoln; London; Ballardvale; Edinburgh; Carlsbad; Oakville	New York; Karnataka; England; Scotland; Massachusetts; California; Ontario	United States; India; United Kingdom; Canada	1998; 2016; 2004; 2002; 2005; 2008; 2002; 2002; 1999	Grand Theft Auto franchise Manhunt series Midnight Club series Red Dead series Bully	Developer/publisher; owned by Take-Two Interactive
Rockstar Dundee	Dundee	Scotland	United Kingdom	2008	Crackdown 2	Acquired by Take-Two Interactive in 2020
Rocksteady Studios	London	England	United Kingdom	2005	Batman: Arkham series Suicide Squad: Kill the Justice League	Subsidiary of Warner Bros. Interactive Entertainment
Robinson Technologies	Hiroshima		Japan	1989	Dink Smallwood	
Romero Games	Galway		Ireland	2015	Empire of Sin	
Rovio Entertainment	Espoo		Finland	2003	Angry Birds franchise Sonic Rumble	Publisher, developer and distributor; acquired by Sega in 2023
Runic Games	Seattle	Washington	United States	2008	Torchlight series	Subsidiary of Perfect World; closed in 2017
Running with Scissors	Tucson	Arizona	United States	1997	Postal series	
Saber Interactive	Millburn	New Jersey	United States	2001	World War Z	Acquired by Embracer Group in 2020 and acquired by Beacon Interactive in 2024
Sandlot	Tokyo		Japan	2001	Robot Alchemic Drive; Earth Defense Force series Zangeki no Reginleiv	Formed by former employees of Human Entertainment
Sanzaru Games	Foster City	California	United States	2006	Sly Cooper: Thieves in Time; Sonic Boom: Shattered Crystal; Sonic Boom: Fire & Ice; Asgard's Wrath series	Acquired by Facebook in 2020.; closed in 2026
Sir-Tech	Ogdensburg	New York	United States; Canada	1979	Wizardry series Jagged Alliance series	
Schell Games	Pittsburgh	Pennsylvania	United States	2002	I Expect You to Die series	Developer and publisher
SCS Software	Prague		Czech Republic	1997	18 Wheels of Steel series Truck Simulator series	
Sega	Tokyo		Japan	1960	Sonic the Hedgehog franchise Crazy Taxi series Golden Axe series Streets of Rage series The House of the Dead series Super Monkey Ball series Puyo Puyo series Jet Set Radio series Phantasy Star series Panzer Dragoon series Fantasy Zone series Let's Make a Soccer Team! series Mario & Sonic at the Olympic Games series Shenmue series Sakura Wars series Yakuza franchise Valkyria Chronicles series Mushiking series Border Break series Shinobi series Hatsune Miku: Project DIVA series Virtua Fighter series Virtua Tennis series World Club Champion Football series Samba de Amigo series	Third-party (Formerly first-party) developer, publisher, and former console manufacturer; subsidiary of Sega Sammy Holdings
Sensible Software	Cambridge	England	United Kingdom	1986	Sensible Soccer series Cannon Fodder series Mega Lo Mania; Wizball; Wizkid; Microprose Soccer; Shoot-'Em-Up Construction Kit; Parallax; Sensible Golf	Developer, studio closed and company acquired by Codemasters in 1999
San Diego Studio	San Diego	California	United States	2001	MLB: The Show series	Division of SIE Worldwide Studios
Santa Monica Studio	Los Angeles	California	United States	1999	God of War series	Division of SIE Worldwide Studios
Studio Liverpool	Liverpool	England	United Kingdom	1984	Wipeout series Formula One series Colony Wars series	Former Division of SIE Worldwide Studios; shut down by Sony on August 22, 2012
Shaba Games	San Francisco	California	United States	1997	Tony Hawk's Underground 2: Remix; Spider-Man: Web of Shadows	Acquired by Activision in 2002; defunct in 2009
SingleTrac	Salt Lake City	Utah	United States	1994	Twisted Metal 1–2; Jet Moto 1–2; Warhawk (1995)	Defunct in 2000
Shengqu Games	Shanghai		China	1999		Acquired by Zhejiang Century Huatong in 2017
Sherman3D	Petaling Jaya		Malaysia	2003	Alpha Kimori	
Shift Up	Seoul		South Korea	2013	Stellar Blade	
Shiro Games	Bordeaux		France	2012	Dune: Spice Wars	
Shin'en Multimedia	Munich		Germany	1999	Fast Racing League series	
Sierra Entertainment	Oakhurst	California	United States	1979	Mystery House; King's Quest series Space Quest series Police Quest series Leisure Suit Larry series Quest for Glory series Gabriel Knight series	Subsidiary of Activision; internal development ceased in 1999; closed in 2004
Silicon Knights	St. Catharines	Ontario	Canada	1992	Blood Omen: Legacy of Kain; Eternal Darkness: Sanity's Requiem; Too Human	Closed in 2014
Silicon Studio	Tokyo		Japan	2000	Bravely Default series	They still develop game middlewares but their game contents division was sold to CREEK & RIVER.
Simtex	Austin	Texas	United States	1988	Master of Orion series Master of Magic	Closed in 1997
skip Ltd.	Tokyo		Japan	2000	bit Generations series Chibi-Robo! series	Formed by former employees of Love-de-Lic; closed in 2020
SkyBox Labs	Burnaby	British Columbia	Canada	2011	Kinect Nat Geo TV; Project Spark	Acquired by NetEase Games in 2023.
Slant Six Games	Vancouver	British Columbia	Canada	2005	SOCOM U.S. Navy SEALs series Resident Evil: Operation Raccoon City	Defunct in 2013
Sledgehammer Games	Foster City	California	United States	2009	Call of Duty: Advanced Warfare co-developer of Call of Duty: Modern Warfare 3	Subsidiary of Activision
Snail	Suzhou		China	2000	Voyage Century Online	
Snapshot Games	Sofia		Bulgaria	2013	Chaos Reborn; Phoenix Point	Acquired by Embracer Group in 2020.
Slightly Mad Studios	London	England	United Kingdom	2008	Project CARS series Test Drive: Ferrari Racing Legends	Acquired by Codemasters in 2019
Slipgate Ironworks	Aars		Denmark	2017	Rad Rodgers	Formed by former employees of Interceptor Entertainment; acquired by Saber Interactive in 2021
Slitherine Software	Epsom	England	United Kingdom	2000	Horrible Histories: Ruthless Romans	
Smilegate	Seoul		South Korea	2002	Crossfire series	
SMG Studio	Sydney	Australia		2013	Lego Party; Moving Out series Death Squared	style="background:#c9daff;"
Smoking Gun Interactive	Vancouver		Canada	2007	Age of Empires: Castle Siege; Microsoft Solitaire Collection	Acquired by Keywords Studios in 2022
SNK	Osaka		Japan	2001	Fatal Fury series The King of Fighters series Metal Slug series Samurai Showdown series The Last Blade series World Heroes series	Acquired by 37Games in 2015; game hardware and software developer/publisher/manufacture
Sobee Studios	Istanbul		Turkey	2000	I Can Football; Süpercan	Merged into TTNET; closed in 2013
Snowblind Studios	Seattle	Washington	United States	1997	Top Gear Overdrive; Champions of Norrath	Subsidiary of Warner Bros. Interactive Entertainment; defunct in 2012
Software 2000	Eutin		Germany	1987	Pizza Tycoon series	Closed in 2002
Sony Interactive Entertainment	Tokyo (SIE, Inc.) San Mateo (SIE, LLC)	Japan (SIE, Inc.) California (SIE, LLC)	United States	1994	Various titles	First-party developer, publisher and console manufacturer
Sora Ltd.	Tokyo		Japan	2005	Kid Icarus: Uprising; Super Smash Bros. for Nintendo 3DS and Wii U Super Smash Bros. Ultimate; Kirby Air Riders	
Spellbound Entertainment	Offenburg		Germany	1994	Desperados series Arcania: Gothic 4	Closed in 2012
Spiders	Paris		France	2008	The Technomancer; GreedFall series	Acquired by Bigben Interactive (latterly Nacon) in 2019; closed in 2026
Spike	Tokyo		Japan	1991	Dragon Ball Z: Budokai Tenkaichi series	Merged with Chunsoft to become Spike Chunsoft in 2012
Spike Chunsoft	Tokyo		Japan	2012	Zero Escape series Danganronpa franchise AI: The Somnium Files series Mystery Dungeon franchise: Pokémon Mystery Dungeon series; Jump Force	The result of a merger between Spike and Chunsoft and is owned by Dwango
Spil Games	Hilversum		Netherlands	2001		Web game developer/publisher. Acquired by Azerion.
Splash Damage	London	England	United Kingdom	2001	Enemy Territory: Quake Wars; Brink; Dirty Bomb	Acquired by Leyou in 2016 and then Leyou was acquired by Tencent in 2020; acquired by a Private Equity in 2025
Sports Interactive	London	England	United Kingdom	1994	Championship Manager series Football Manager series Eastside Hockey Manager series	Acquired by Sega in 2006
Sproing Interactive Media	Vienna		Austria	2001	Cursed Mountain	Defunct in 2017; their assets were acquired by Purple Lamp Studios
Square Enix	Shinjuku, Tokyo		Japan	1975	Final Fantasy franchise: Final Fantasy Tactics series; Crystal Chronicles series; Chocobo series; Mana series SaGa series Chrono series Bahamut Lagoon; Threads of Fate; Brave Fencer Musashi; Star Ocean franchise Valkyrie Profile series Kingdom Hearts franchise Dragon Quest franchise Drakengard series: Nier series; Bravely Default series Octopath Traveler; Front Mission series Xenogears	Developer/publisher; previously known as Square Co. and Enix
Squad	Mexico City		Mexico	2009	Kerbal Space Program series	
Stainless Games	Newport	England	United Kingdom	1993	Magic: The Gathering – Duels of the Planeswalkers series	
Stainless Steel Studios	Cambridge	Massachusetts	United States	1998	Empire Earth	Closed in 2005
Starbreeze Studios	Uppsala		Sweden	1998	Enclave; Riddick; Syndicate; Brothers: A Tale of Two Sons; Payday 3	
Stardock	Plymouth	Michigan	United States	1991	Galactic Civilizations series	Developer/publisher
Sting Entertainment	Tokyo		Japan	1989	Baroque series Dungeon Travelers series	
Strategic Simulations	Sunnyvale	California	United States	1979	Gold Box series Panzer General series	Closed in 1994
Stoic Studio	Austin	Texas	United States	2011	The Banner Saga series	Founded by former employees of BioWare
Strawdog Studios	Derby	England	United Kingdom	2003	Geon series	
Straylight Studios	Dunedin		New Zealand	2004		Closed in 2009
Streamline Studios	Kuala Lumpur		Malaysia	2001		
Success	Tokyo		Japan	1978	Cotton series	
Sucker Punch Productions	Bellevue	Washington	United States	1997	Rocket: Robot on Wheels; Sly Cooper series Infamous series Ghost series	Division of SIE Worldwide Studios since 2011
Sumo Digital	Sheffield	England	United Kingdom	2003	LittleBigPlanet 3 Crackdown 3 Sonic & All-Stars Racing Transformed; Team Sonic Racing; Gears of War: Reloaded	Subsidiary of Sumo Group
Sunsoft	Kōnan	Aichi	Japan	1978	Gimmick! series Ufouria: The Saga series Blaster Master	Developer and publisher. Division of Sun Corporation.
Supercell	Helsinki		Finland	2010	Clash of Clans; Hay Day; Boom Beach; Clash Royale	Subsidiary of Tencent
Supermassive Games	Guildford	England	United Kingdom	2008	Until Dawn series The Dark Pictures Anthology series Start the Party! series Doctor Who: The Eternity Clock; Little Nightmares III	Acquired by Nordisk Games, a subsidiary of Nordisk Film, in 2022
Supergiant Games	San Francisco	California	United States	2009	Hades series	
SuperVillain Studios	Orange County	California	United States	2004	Order Up!	acquired by Nicalis in 2017
Survios	Los Angeles	California	United States	2013		
Studio Wildcard	Kirkland	Washington	United States	2014	Ark series	
Swordfish Studios	Birmingham	England	United Kingdom	2002	Brian Lara International Cricket 2005	Acquired by Vivendi Games in 2005 and then acquired by Codemasters in 2008; defunct in 2010
Swingin' Ape Studios	Aliso Viejo	California	United States	2000	Metal Arms: Glitch in the System	Acquired by Blizzard Entertainment
StormRegion	Budapest		Hungary	2001	S.W.I.N.E. Codename: Panzers series	Acquired by 10tacle Studios AG in 2007 and then defunct in 2008
Sunstorm Interactive	Indianapolis	Indiana	United States	1995	Deer Hunter series	Defunct in 2003
Syn Sophia	Tokyo		Japan	1995	WCW/nWo Revenge; SimCity DS series Style Savvy series Pretty Series franchise: Pretty Rhythm series; PriPara series; Pri Chan series; PriMagi series; AiPri series	
SystemSoft Beta	Tokyo		Japan	1999	Daisenryaku series	Subsidiary of Nippon Ichi Software, successor of SystemSoft Alpha
Taito	Shinjuku, Tokyo		Japan	1953	Space Invaders; Bubble Bobble series	Developer/publisher; acquired by Square Enix
Tango Gameworks	Minato, Tokyo		Japan	2010	The Evil Within series Ghostwire: Tokyo; Hi-Fi Rush	Acquired by ZeniMax Media in 2010, and founded by Shinji Mikami. Defunct in May 2024. Acquired and revived in August 2024 by Krafton.
Tag Games	Dundee	Scotland	United Kingdom	2006		Acquired by Scopely in 2023
TaleWorlds Entertainment	Ankara		Turkey	2005	Mount & Blade series	
Tamsoft	Asakusa		Japan	1992	Toshinden series Onechanbara series Senran Kagura series Captain Tsubasa: Rise of New Champions	
T&E Soft		Aichi	Japan	1982	Hydlide series	Merged into Spike Chunsoft in 2013, and rights to the games sold to D4 Enterprise in 2019.
Tantalus Media	Melbourne	Victoria	Australia	1994		mostly acquired by Keywords Studios in 2021
Tarsier Studios	Malmö		Sweden	2004	Little Nightmares series	Acquired by Embracer Group in 2019.
Tate Multimedia	Warsaw		Poland	2002	Kao the Kangaroo series Urban Trial Freestyle	The company still exists, but they became a third-party publisher.
Team17	Ossett	England	United Kingdom	1990	Alien Breed series Worms series The Escapists series Overcooked series	Subsidiary of Everplay
Team Asobi	Tokyo		Japan	2012 (as division of Japan Studio); 2021 (as Team Asobi)	Astro Bot series	Division of SIE Worldwide Studios
Team Bondi	Sydney	New South Wales	Australia	2003	L.A. Noire	Closed in 2011
Team Ico	Tokyo		Japan	1997	Ico; Shadow of the Colossus	Division of Japan Studio; Their staffs moved to genDESIGN
Team Ninja	Tokyo		Japan	1995	Ninja Gaiden series Dead or Alive franchise Nioh series Marvel Ultimate Alliance 3	Division of Koei Tecmo Games; formerly a division of Tecmo
Team Soho	Soho	London	United Kingdom	1995	The Getaway Series NBA Shootout This is football	Closed in 2002 after merging with SCE Studio Camden
Techland	Wrocław, Warszawa		Poland	1991	Chrome series Call of Juarez series Dead Island series Dying Light series	Developer/publisher; mostly acquired by Tencent
Tecmo	Tokyo		Japan	1967	Ninja Gaiden series Dead or Alive franchise Monster Rancher series Gallop Racer series Fatal Frame series	Tecmo and Koei co-founded Koei Tecmo Holdings in 2009 and Tecmo was merged into Koei Tecmo Games in 2010
Telltale Games	San Rafael	California	United States	2004	Sam & Max episodic series The Walking Dead series The Wolf Among Us; Tales from the Borderlands; Game of Thrones; Minecraft: Story Mode	Founded by former employees of LucasArts, defunct in 2018; their assets were acquired by LCG Entertainment
Tencent	Shenzhen		China	1998		Developer, publisher, online services company
Tencent Games	Shenzhen		China	2003	Ring of Elysium; Arena Breakout: Infinite	Division of Tencent Interactive Entertainment
Ten Square Games	Wrocław	Lower Silesian Voivodeship	Poland	2011	"Let's Fish" "Fishing Clash" "Hunting Clash"	Mobile game development
Tequila Works	Madrid		Spain	2009	Deadlight	Defunct in November 12, 2024
Terminal Reality	Lewisville	Texas	United States	1994	Monster Truck Madness series	Closed in 2013
Tetris Online	Honolulu	Hawaii	United States	2006	Tetris Friends	Closed in 2019
Teyon	Kraków		Poland	2006	Heavy Fire series	
Thatgamecompany	Santa Monica	California	United States	2006	Journey; Sky	
The Chinese Room	Brighton	England	United Kingdom	2007	Amnesia: A Machine For Pigs	Formerly a subsidiary of Sumo Digital
The Coalition	Vancouver		Canada	2010	Gears of War series	Subsidiary of Microsoft Studios
The Farm 51	Gliwice		Poland	2005	Get Even	
The Initiative	Santa Monica	California	United States	2018	Perfect Dark (cancelled)	Subsidiary of Microsoft Studios; closed in 2025
THQ	Agoura Hills	California	United States	1989		Developer/publisher; defunct in 2013; their assets were acquired by Nordic Games, 505 Games, or Gearbox Software
THQ Nordic	Vienna		Austria	2011	SpellForce 3	Developer/publisher; subsidiary of Embracer Group
Three Rings Design	San Francisco	California	United States	2001	Doctor Who: Worlds in Time	
Tilted Mill Entertainment	Winchester	Massachusetts	United States	2002	SimCity Societies series Hinterland series	
TimeGate Studios	Sugar Land	Texas	United States	1998	Kohan series Section 8 series	
TiMi Studios	Shenzhen		China	2008	Call of Duty: Mobile; Pokémon Unite	Subsidiary of Tencent Games
Toaplan	Tokyo		Japan	1984	Snow Bros.	Developer of arcade games; went bankrupt and closed in 1994
Toby Fox			United States	2015	Undertale; Deltarune	
Toca Boca	Stockholm		Sweden	2010	Toca Life series	Subsidiary of Spin Master
ToeJam & Earl Productions	San Francisco	California	United States	1989 (as Johnson Voorsanger Productions)	ToeJam & Earl series	Founded by Mark Voorsanger and Greg Johnson; became defunct in 2003
Tokyo RPG Factory	Tokyo		Japan	2014	I Am Setsuna; Lost Sphear; Oninaki	Subsidiary of Square Enix; closed in 2024
Too Kyo Games	Tokyo		Japan	2017	Master Detective Archives: Rain Code Tribe Nine The Hundred Line: Last Defense Academy	Founded by ex-employees of Spike Chunsoft, Kazutaka Kodaka, Kotaro Uchikoshi, Masafumi Takada and Rui Komatsuzaki.
Toolworks	Novato	California	United States	1980	Chessmaster 2000; Mavis Beacon Teaches Typing; Mario Is Missing!	Acquired by Pearson plc
TopWare Interactive	Karlsruhe		Germany	1995		Publisher (developing in Reality Pump Studios division)
Torpex Games	Bellevue	Washington	United States	2005	Schizoid	
Torus Games	Bayswater	Victoria	Australia	1994	Scooby-Doo! First Frights; Scooby-Doo! and the Spooky Swamp; Shrek Smash n' Crash Racing; Monster Jam series	effectively closed in 2024.
Tose	Kyoto		Japan	1979	The Legendary Starfy series Dragon Quest Monsters series Slime series World of Final Fantasy; Super Princess Peach	
Toys for Bob	Novato	California	United States	1989	Skylanders series Crash Bandicoot 4 Spyro Reignited Trilogy; Spyro: A Realm Beyond	Former subsidiary of Activision; became independent in 2024
Trapdoor	Montreal	Quebec	Canada	2010	Warp	
Transmission Games	Melbourne	Victoria	Australia	1996	Heroes of the Pacific; Heroes Over Europe	Closed in 2009
Traveller's Tales	Knutsford	England	United Kingdom	1990	Lego series Crash Bandicoot: The Wrath of Cortex	Subsidiary of TT Games
Treyarch	Santa Monica	California	United States	1996	Call of Duty series Spider-Man (2002)	Acquired by Activision in 2001.
Treasure	Tokyo		Japan	1992	Gunstar Heroes; Dynamite Headdy; Guardian Heroes; Alien Soldier; Bangai-O; Ikaruga; Sin and Punishment series Gaist Crusher	
tri-Ace	Tokyo		Japan	1995	Star Ocean franchise Valkyrie Profile series	Acquired by Nepro Japan (currently NJ Holdings) in 2015
tri-Crescendo	Tokyo		Japan	1999	Digimon World Re:Digitize series	
Trion Worlds	Redwood City	California	United States	2006	Rift	Defunct in 2018; their assets were acquired by Gamigo
Tripwire Interactive	Roswell	Georgia	United States	2005	Killing Floor series Red Orchestra: Ostfront 41-45	Acquired by Embracer Group in 2022
Triumph Studios	Delft		Netherlands	1997	Age of Wonders series Overlord series	Acquired by Paradox Interactive
Turn 10 Studios	Redmond	Washington	United States	2001	Forza Motorsport series	Subsidiary of Microsoft Studios; merged into Playground Games in 2026.
Turtle Rock Studios	Lake Forest	California	United States	2002	Left 4 Dead series Evolve	Acquired by Tencent in 2021
Two Point Studios	Farnham, Surrey	England	United Kingdom	2016	Two Point series	Formed by former employees of Lionhead Studios; acquired by Sega in 2019
Two Tribes	Amersfoort		Netherlands	2000	Toki Tori series	
Typhoon Games (HK)	Hong Kong SAR		China	2001		Subsidiary of Typhoon Entertainment (Asia)
Ubisoft	Montreuil-sous-Bois		France	1986	Rayman series Assassin's Creed series Just Dance series Prince of Persia series Far Cry series ZombiU; Tom Clancy's Ghost Recon series Tom Clancy's Rainbow Six series Tom Clancy's Splinter Cell series Beyond Good & Evil series	Developer/publisher
Ubisoft Blue Byte	Düsseldorf		Germany	1988	Battle Isle series The Settlers series Anno series	Acquired by Ubisoft
Ubisoft Leamington	Leamington Spa	England	United Kingdom	2002	DJ Hero series Guitar Hero Live	Acquired by Activision in 2008 and acquired by Ubisoft in 2017; defunct in 2025.
Ubisoft Reflections	Newcastle upon Tyne	England	United Kingdom	1984	Driver series Destruction Derby series	Acquired by Ubisoft
UEP Systems	Tokyo		Japan	1985	Cool Boarders series	Defunct in 2001
Ultimate Play the Game	Ashby-de-la-Zouch	England	United Kingdom	1982	Jetpac; Lunar Jetman; Atic Atac; Sabreman series Alien 8	Predecessor to Rare; Defunct in 1988
Undead Labs	Seattle	Washington	United States	2009	State of Decay series	Acquired by Microsoft Studios in 2018; became independent in 2026
Underground Development	Foster City	California	United States	1994	Guitar Hero: Van Halen	Acquired by Activision in 2002; dissolved in 2010
United Front Games	Vancouver	British Columbia	Canada	2006	ModNation Racers; Sleeping Dogs; LittleBigPlanet Karting	Defunct in 2016
United Game Artists	Tokyo		Japan	1996	Space Channel 5 series Rez	Subsidiary of Sega
Unity Technologies	San Francisco	California	United States	2004	Survival Kids (2025)	
Universomo	Tampere		Finland	2002		Defunct in 2010
Unknown Worlds Entertainment	San Francisco	California	United States	2001	Natural Selection series Subnautica series	Acquired by Krafton in 2021
Valhalla Game Studios	Tokyo		Japan	2008	Devil's Third; Momotaro Dentetsu 2017	Acquired by Wake Up Interactive in 2017 and merged into Wake Up Interactive by Tencent, its new parent company, in 2021
Valve	Kirkland	Washington	United States	1996	Half-Life series Portal series Left 4 Dead series Team Fortress 2 Dota 2 Counter-Strike series Day of Defeat series Ricochet	Developer, publisher and distributor
Vanillaware	Chūō-ku, Osaka		Japan	2002	Odin Sphere; GrimGrimoire; Muramasa: The Demon Blade; Dragon's Crown; 13 Sentinels: Aegis Rim	
Vanpool	Tokyo		Japan	1999	Tingle series Super Kirby Clash; Kirby Fighters 2	Formed by former employees of Love-de-Lic; closed in 2023
Velan Studios	Troy	New York	United States	2012	Knockout City; Mario Kart Live: Home Circuit; Star Fox	Formed by former Vicarious Visions developers
VG Entertainment	Kyiv		Ukraine	2012	Survarium	Vostok Games was founded in March 2012 by former employees of GSC Game World, following that firm's closing
Vic Tokai		Shizuoka	Japan	1984		Developer and publisher. Branch of Tokai Communications.
Vicarious Visions	Albany (Menands)	New York	United States	1990	Guitar Hero series (Wii and DS version); Tony Hawk series: Tony Hawk's Pro Skater 2–4 (GBA version); Tony Hawk's Underground series (GBA version); Tony Hawk's Pro Skater 1 + 2; Skylanders: SuperChargers; Crash Bandicoot series: Crash Bandicoot handheld series; Crash Nitro Kart; Crash Purple and Spyro Orange; Crash Bandicoot N. Sane Trilogy; Marvel: Ultimate Alliance 2	Acquired by Activision in 2004; merged into Blizzard Entertainment in 2021.
Vigil Games	Austin	Texas	United States	2005	Darksiders series	Subsidiary of THQ; defunct in 2013
Virtual Heroes	Raleigh	North Carolina	United States	2004	Moonbase Alpha	acquired by Applied Research Associates in 2009
Virtuos			Singapore	2004	Monster Jam: Path of Destruction; Ghost Recon Predator; The Elder Scrolls IV: Oblivion Remastered	
Visceral Games	Redwood City	California	United States	1998	Dead Space series	Formerly known as EA Redwood Shores, former in-house development studio and subsidiary of Electronic Arts, closed in 2017.
Visual Concepts	Novato	California	United States	1988	NFL 2K; NBA 2K series MLB 2K series NHL 2K series WWE 2K20	Subsidiary of 2K
Volition	Champaign	Illinois	United States	1996	Saints Row series Red Faction series	Acquired by Koch Media in 2013 and managed by its Deep Silver division; transferred to the Gearbox Entertainment belonging to the same industrial group in 2022 and closed in 2023
Wahoo Studios	Orem	Utah	United States	2001		
Warhorse Studios	Prague		Czech Republic	2011	Kingdom Come: Deliverance	Acquired by Koch Media in 2019
Wargaming	Nicosia; Minsk		Cyprus; Belarus	1998	World of Tanks; World of Warplanes	Developer/publisher
Wargaming Chicago-Baltimore (formerly Meyer/Glass Interactive, Day 1 Studios, and Wargaming West Corporation)	Chicago	Illinois	United States	2001	Axis & Allies series MechAssault series	Merged with WarGaming
Wargaming Seattle	Redmond	Washington	United States	1998	Supreme Commander	Subsidiary of Wargaming
Warner Bros. Interactive Entertainment	Chicago	Illinois	United States	1988	Batman: Arkham series Lego series F.E.A.R. series Mortal Kombat series	Division of Warner Bros. Entertainment which is a subsidiary of WarnerMedia
WB Games Boston (formerly Turbine)	Needham	Massachusetts	United States	1994	Asheron's Call series Dungeons & Dragons Online; The Lord of the Rings Online	Subsidiary of Warner Bros. Interactive Entertainment
WB Games - Avalanche (formerly Avalanche Software)	Salt Lake City	Utah	United States	1995	Disney Infinity series Hogwarts Legacy	Subsidiary of Disney Interactive Studios; defunct in 2016; Relaunched by Warner Bros. in 2017.
Webfoot Technologies	Chicago	Illinois	United States	1993	Dragon Ball Z: The Legacy of Goku; You Don't Know Jack! series Deadly Rooms of Death	Creators of many Dragon Ball Z games for Atari; specializes in Nintendo platforms
WeMade	Seoul		South Korea	2000	The Legend of Mir series	
Westone Bit Entertainment	Tokyo		Japan	1986	Wonder Boy series Monster World series	Bankrupt and became defunct in 2014
Westwood Studios	Las Vegas	Nevada	United States	1985	Eye of the Beholder; Dune II; The Legend of Kyrandia series Monopoly (1995); Lands of Lore series Command & Conquer series	Acquired by Electronic Arts in 1998 and closed in 2003.
Wicked Workshop	Melbourne		Australia	2001	AFL Challenge; AFL Live 2 AFL Evolution series Rugby Challenge 3	Acquired by Keywords Studios in 2021
Wideload Games	Chicago	Illinois	United States	2003	Stubbs the Zombie in Rebel Without a Pulse	Subsidiary of Disney Interactive Studios; closed in 2014
Wizet studio (Nexon development 1st division)	Seoul		South Korea	1999	MapleStory	Acquired by Nexon and became to its division
Wolfire Games	Berkeley	California	United States	2003		
World Forge	Voronezh		Russia	2004	Ancient Wars: Sparta	Founded by Burut Creative Team employees.
Xbox Game Studios	Redmond	Washington	United States	2002	Age of Empires series Crackdown series Forza Motorsport series Gears of War series Halo series Microsoft Flight Simulator series Zoo Tycoon series	First-party developer, publisher, and console manufacturer; established as Microsoft Game Studios
XPEC Entertainment	Taipei		Taiwan	2000	Bounty Hounds	Developer/publisher
Yager Development	Berlin		Germany	1999	Spec Ops: The Line	mostly acquired by Tencent in 2021
Yuke's	Osaka		Japan	1993	WWE 2K series (–2018); Earth Defense Force: Iron Rain	
ZeniMax Online Studios	Hunt Valley	Maryland	United States	2007	The Elder Scrolls Online	Subsidiary of ZeniMax Media Inc
Zen Studios	Budapest		Hungary	2003	Pinball FX series	Acquired by Embracer Group in 2020.
Zipper Interactive	Redmond	Washington	United States	1995	SOCOM U.S. Navy SEALs series MechWarrior 3 Top Gun: Hornet's Nest	Shut down in 2012 by Sony Computer Entertainment
Zombie Studios	Seattle	Washington	United States	1994	Spec Ops: Rangers Lead the Way; Blacklight: Retribution	
ZootFly	Ljubljana		Slovenia	2002	Marlow Briggs and the Mask of Death	Acquired by Elektroncek
Zynga	San Francisco	California	United States	2007	FarmVille series Zynga Poker	Social network game developer; acquired by Take-Two Interactive in 2022

== See also ==
- List of indie game developers
