= Appy =

Appy may refer to:

- Christian Appy (born 1955), professor of history
- Appy, Ariège, a commune in the Ariège department of southwestern France
- Appy Awards, for popular applications for mobile devices
- Appy Entertainment, American videogames company
- Appy Fizz, Indian soft drink

== See also ==
- AppyParking, British parking technology company
