= Skulk (disambiguation) =

Skulk is a term for a group of foxes.

Skulk can also refer to:

- Skulk (comics), a comic book character from Amalgam Comics
- Skulk, video game character in Natural Selection (video game)
- Skulk, role-playing game character from Dungeons and Dragons, see list of Advanced Dungeons & Dragons 2nd edition monsters
- Skulk, an album by English singer-songwriter Jim Moray
- Skulk, video game character in Kiloo and Cophenhagen Creator's mobile RPG Dawnbringer
