= Schizoid (disambiguation) =

Schizoid primarily refers to Schizoid personality disorder.

Schizoid may also refer to:

- Schizoid (film), 1980
- Schizoid (video game)
- "Schizoid" (The Prisoner), a 2009 television episode
