= Smash Champs =

2014 video game

- Developer: Kiloo
- Platforms: Android, iOS, Windows Phone
- Release: 2014
- Genre: Fighting

Smash Champs is a fighting video game developed by Kiloo for Android, iOS and Windows Phone, released in 2014.

== Reception ==
The gameplay was criticised as "a mediocre Fruit Ninja clone", while other reviewers praised the graphics: "Graphics are well drawn up and the animations help add character to your fighters."
