= Black Stone: Magic & Steel =

2003 video game

- North American cover art
- Developer: XPEC Entertainment
- Publishers: WW: Xicat Interactive; JP: Idea Factory
- Director: Tony Wang
- Producers: Tony Wang; Shingo Kuwana; Yoshiteru Sato
- Designer: Charley Hsu
- Programmer: LaPhonso Lee
- Artist: McCoy Chen
- Writers: Kayin Chang; Tony Wang; Eric Ryder
- Composers: Toru Kobayashi; Eric Ryder
- Platform: Xbox
- Release: 2003
- Genre: Action role-playing
- Modes: Single-player, multiplayer

Black Stone: Magic & Steel, known in Japan as Ex-Chaser (エクスチェイサー, Ekusu-Cheisā), is an action role-playing video game developed by XPEC Entertainment and published by Xicat Interactive for the Xbox. The theme song is "be with you" by Chihiro Yonekura.

== Gameplay ==
In a quest to stop Xylon, the player can choose one of the five character classes (warrior, archer, warlock, pirate, thief). Through 26 levels, all enemies including scorpions, goblins, or bugs, can be dealt with by a melee combat, ranged weapons, and magical attacks.

== Reception ==
Reception

Aggregate score
Aggregator	Score
Metacritic	44/100

Review scores
Publication	Score
4Players	63%
Famitsu	23/40
Game Informer	3/10
GamesMaster	66%
GameSpot	2.1/10
GameZone	7.2/10
IGN	5.2/10
Official Xbox Magazine (US)	5.6/10
TeamXbox	5/10
X-Play	2/5

The game received "generally unfavorable reviews" according to the review aggregation website Metacritic. Official Xbox Magazine gave it a mixed review while it was still in development. In Japan, Famitsu gave it a score of 23 out of 40.
