= Zoonies - Escape from Makatu =

2011 video game

Zoonies: Escape from Makatu
- Developer: Kiloo
- Publisher: Kiloo
- Platform: Nintendo DS
- Release: EU: April 29, 2011; NA: August 18, 2011
- Genre: Platform game
- Mode: Single-player

Zoonies - Escape from Makatu is a platform game developed and published by Kiloo for the Nintendo DS' DSiWare in 2011.

== Reception ==
Reception

Aggregate score
Aggregator	Score
Metacritic	74/100

Review scores
Publication	Score
Eurogamer	7/10
IGN	8/10
NGamer	60%
Nintendo Life	8/10
Official Nintendo Magazine	74%

The game received "mixed or average reviews" according to the review aggregation website Metacritic.
