= Survarium =

2015 video game

- Developer: Vostok Games
- Publisher: Vostok Games
- Platform: Microsoft Windows
- Release: 2 April 2015 (Steam Early Access)
- Genre: First-person shooter
- Mode: Multiplayer

Survarium was a free-to-play online first-person shooter with role-playing and survival elements developed by Vostok Games. The studio was founded in March 2012 by former employees of GSC Game World, which had closed in December 2011 following the cancellation of S.T.A.L.K.E.R. 2. Although Survarium is external to the S.T.A.L.K.E.R. series, the developers intended to include comparable features, notably the anomalies and artifacts that reference the Russian science-fiction novel Roadside Picnic, and the 'ecological catastrophe' that rendered much of the environment uninhabitable for humans.

== Gameplay ==
Although Vostok Games described Survarium as a massively multiplayer online first-person shooter (MMOFPS), the game never achieved that scale during its lifespan.

=== Planned game modes ===
Vostok Games intended to release three game modes through a series of developer diaries. Of these, only the PvP team play mode was fully implemented before the game's shutdown.

Team play

The PvP mode allowed players to represent their chosen factions and combat against rival factions. Five sub-modes were available: Team Deathmatch, Artifact Hunt, Research, Battery Retrieval, and Slaughter.

Free play

The planned free play mode was to feature a large, session based map with limited numbers of players. Players would enter the map at a random point and freely explore the map to scavenge supplies and uncover story elements. Players would have been able to leave the map with all earned items by getting to one of the exit points located around each map.

If a player is killed, they lose all items found during that session and are moved back to the lobby where they can enter another free play instance.

Co-op

The cooperative game mode was intended to contain the main story arc of Survarium. Squads of players would enter a random map and work together to discover the cause of the apocalypse and a possible defense against its spread.

== Plot ==
A worldwide ecological disaster occurred in the year 2020, wiping out approximately 90% of the human race. The disaster takes the form of a fast-growing forest, that actively seeks out threats to its growth and destroys them. Such targets include weapons manufacturers, military installations and laboratories that are working on methods of stopping the spread of the forest. No manmade efforts to stop the forest worked, with only natural barriers being able to slow it down.

Survarium takes place in 2026 with players attempting to survive and defend themselves against the forest in destroyed cities and encampments. Players can choose to join a faction to gain access to supplies and resources. Players could join one of four available factions to gain access to supplies and resources.The factions all follow different ideals and often conflict with that of other factions, creating hostilities.

The cause of the disaster is not known, stated to be discovered by players as they progress through the game. The story itself is intended to be shaped by choices made by players while representing their chosen factions.

== History ==
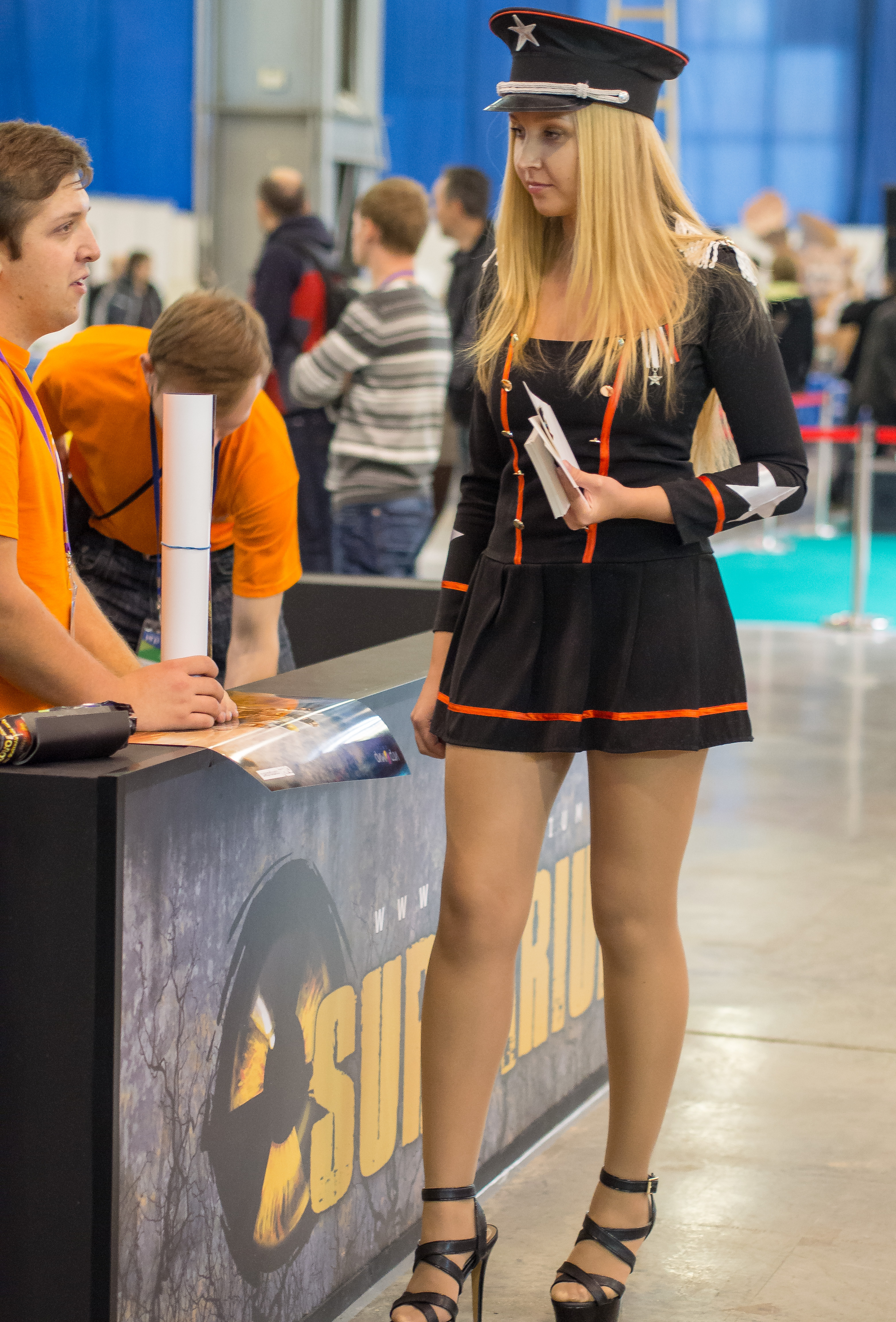
Promotion at IgroMir 2013

On 9 December 2011, video game journalists reported that Sergei Grigorovich, the chief executive officer (CEO) of GSC Game World, had allegedly expressed his disappointment at the development of S.T.A.L.K.E.R. 2 during a meeting with employees. Despite the company's initial denials in response to press inquiries, the media widely reported that senior management had officially cancelled S.T.A.L.K.E.R. 2 and dissolved the company. In March 2012, former employees from GSC Game World founded Vostok Games with capital from Vostok Ventures Ltd, and announced subsequently the development of Survarium on 25 April 2012.

On 13 May 2013, the alpha test started in Russian and Ukrainian-speaking territories. The alpha launched internationally a few weeks later. The closed beta testing for the PvP mode began on 20 December 2013 though the studio noted that much of the planned content had not yet been implemented. Survarium went into open beta on 5 January 2015.

The soundtrack and effects in Survarium were made by the founder of the Ukrainian melodic death metal band Firelake.

== Shutdown ==
Survarium's servers were permanently shut down at 11:59 pm Kyiv time on 31 May 2022. Vostok Games stated in March that it was taking "a break from our work" because of the Russian invasion of Ukraine, which forced some of the development team located in the capital city of Kyiv to relocate to other parts of the country. The studio did not state what impact the invasion had on the decision to shutter Survarium, if any, but the game's closure was actually announced on February 7, just a couple of weeks before the full invasion of Ukraine began.
