= Metal Arms: Glitch in the System =

2003 video game

- North American PS2 cover art
- Developers: Swingin' Ape Studios; Mass Media Inc. (PlayStation 2)
- Publisher: Vivendi Universal Games (Note: Released under the Sierra Entertainment brand name)
- Directors: Dave Wittenberg; Keith Arem
- Writers: Dave Wittenberg; Keith Arem
- Composer: Keith Arem
- Platforms: GameCube, PlayStation 2, Xbox
- Release: NA: November 18, 2003; PAL: December 5, 2003
- Genres: Third-person shooter, action-adventure
- Modes: Single-player, multiplayer

Metal Arms: Glitch in the System is a third-person shooter action-adventure video game, developed by American team Swingin' Ape Studios, published by Vivendi Universal Games and their subsidiary Sierra Entertainment and released in 2003. The game follows a robot named Glitch as he joins forces with the Droids in their fight against General Corrosive and his Milbots.

== Gameplay ==
The player plays as a robot named Glitch on a planet called “Iron Star”. A group of evil robots are attempting to take over the planet.

In total, there are forty two levels in the story campaign. The main environments the player traverses include cave systems and cities. There is a multiplayer mode, in which the game becomes a third-person shooter game.

General Corrosive, the final boss and main antagonist of the game, can be unlocked for use in the multiplayer aspect of the game.

=== Setting ===
Metal Arms is set on the planet Iron Star, built by an ancient race, Morbots, out of scrap metal and space junk. The Morbots are rumored to still inhabit Iron Star's core, where none of the surface dwellers venture for fear of deactivation and destruction. As the life of the native Droids evolved, a scientist, Dr. Exavolt, experimented with Droid technology, attempting to evolve it beyond its current limits. Exavolt's experiments were successful, however he could not advance Droid scientists. One of his experiments inadvertently resulted in the tyrannical military mastermind known as General Corrosive. Corrosive began manufacturing a race of soldiers known as Milbots, or Mils, and enslaved the Droid race of Iron Star. Droids who rebelled against Corrosive were deactivated and recycled. Colonel Alloy, a former architect, established a hidden Droid settlement known as Droid Town, where he and the Droid Rebellion make their final stand against the Mils.

=== Story ===
Glitch is found deactivated in a ruined city by Droid rebels. He is reactivated in Droid Town, the last stronghold for the rebellion, where it is discovered that Glitch's memory has been erased. When he is brought up to date on the rebellion, Droid Town is attacked by Milbots. Glitch aids in the defense of the city and pursues a Mil, Vlax, that got away, so he could not report the location of Droid Town to General Corrosive. While almost everyone is safely in hiding, one of Glitch's friends, Zobby, was taken by Exavolt. Glitch finds Exavolt on a space shuttle ready to take off. Glitch attaches himself to the outside of the shuttle as it takes off. The shuttle docks with a space station in hiding behind a fake moon in orbit over Iron Star.

As Glitch searches for Zobby, he takes control of General Corrosive, and initiates the permanent shutdown of the Milbots. Seeing that the station is lost, Exavolt begins a self-destruct countdown in the station. Glitch and Zobby escape in an escape pod and land back on Iron Star. Once back on the surface, Glitch is challenged by General Corrosive, and Glitch defeats him. Glitch is received as a hero for destroying the Milbots, while Exavolt, watching from his shuttle in orbit, vows revenge.

== Development and release ==
Metal Arms: Glitch in the System was developed by Swingin' Ape Studios and published by Vivendi Universal Games on November 18, 2003, in North America for the GameCube, PlayStation 2 and Xbox. It was released on April 21, 2008, for Xbox 360 through Xbox Originals.

Swingin' Ape Studios was a video game development studio founded in July 2000 by Steve Ranck, Mike Starich and Scott Goffman after leaving Midway Home Entertainment. They had just completed the water-based arcade racer Hydro Thunder. Metal Arms was the studio's only release. The company was acquired by and integrated into Blizzard Entertainment in May 2005 after cancelling development on StarCraft: Ghost. The property is currently owned by Blizzard Entertainment, Inc.

== Reception ==
The game received "generally favorable" reviews, according to video game review aggregator Metacritic. IGN stated that "The game successfully merges a light-hearted storyline with some seriously intense combat, a good measure of strategy and a fun multiplayer mode."

During the 7th Annual Interactive Achievement Awards, the Academy of Interactive Arts & Sciences nominated Metal Arms for "Console Action/Adventure Game of the Year".
