= Bauhaus Entertainment =

Japanese video game development company

- Company type: Developer
- Industry: Video game
- Founded: 2006; Japan
- Headquarters: Japan
- Products: Video games
- Owner: Imagica Robot Holdings Inc.
- Website: www.dsp.co.jp/bhe/index.php?lang=EN

Imagica DigitalScape Bauhaus Entertainment (株式会社イマジカデジタルスケープ・バウハウスエンタテインメント) is a Japanese video game developer. Created in 2006 by the human resource agency Imagica DigitalScape (part of Imagica Robot Holdings Inc.), both merged in 2009 in order to be able to diversify its services' spectrum. Bauhaus Entertainment has helped with the creation of over a dozen videogames from well known franchises. The company usually takes part in the creation of character modelling, background modelling, real-time animation and cutscene animation of large games. Bauhaus specializes in keyframe animation and motion capture of triple-A games.

2012 marked the first time the company developed a game internally for mobile devices. The company also released a book detailing how to create 3D models and animate them using Autodesk Maya and Unity, called "Autodesk Maya Learning Book". The third revision of this book was published in 2011. Every year the company attends the Game Developers Conference and in 2012 attended the Tokyo Game Show as well.
