= Frisbee Forever =

2011 video game

- App icon
- Developers: Kiloo; Wham-O
- Publisher: Kiloo
- Platforms: iOS, Android
- Release: May 5, 2011
- Genre: Sports
- Mode: Single-player

Frisbee Forever is a 2011 sports video game co-developed by Wham-O and Kiloo and released on May 5, 2011, for iOS. A sequel, Frisbee Forever 2, was released on June 28, 2012.

== Gameplay ==
In Frisbee Forever, the player controls a frisbee through each of the 100 levels.

== Development and release ==
Frisbee Forever was created from a partnership between the American toy company Wham-O and the Danish game studio Kiloo.

Frisbee Forever was released for iOS devices on May 5, 2011.

== Reception ==
Reception

Aggregate score
Aggregator	Score
Metacritic	86/100

Review scores
Publication	Score
Eurogamer	9/10
Pocket Gamer	8/10
TouchArcade	4/5

=== Frisbee Forever ===
On Metacritic, Frisbee Forever has a "generally favorable" rating of 86% based on seven critic reviews.

Several reviewers gave positive reviews.

=== Frisbee Forever 2 ===
The sequel has a "generally favorable" Metacritic rating of 89% based on five critic reviews.

Various critics gave positive reviews.
