= Bounty Hounds =

2006 video game

- North American box art
- Developer: XPEC Entertainment
- Publisher: Namco
- Director: Naotake Hirata
- Producers: Eric Chang & Koh Onda
- Designer: Hoshin Liao
- Composer: F.I.R.
- Platform: PlayStation Portable
- Release: NA: September 12, 2006; JP: September 21, 2006; KOR: October 13, 2006
- Genre: Action role-playing
- Modes: Single-player, multiplayer

Bounty Hounds (Note: Japanese: バウンティ ハウンズ) is an action role-playing video game published by Namco and developed by XPEC Entertainment for the PlayStation Portable, released in 2006.

The plot revolves around a group of intergalactic mercenaries, known as the Bounty Hounds, led by Maximilian (the playable character), on a mission to eradicate the indigenous lifeforms of alien planets, so the human race may colonize them. In the course of it, they unravel a conspiracy among the most powerful corporations on Earth.

== Gameplay ==
The gameplay is a mix of hack and slash and role-playing video game, with some elements of third-person shooter. The player is able to find and equip over 500 weapons, and even more pieces of armor. Using experiences points gained by killing the enemies, the player is able to upgrade Maximilian's stats and earn skills.

== Reception ==
Reception

Aggregate score
Aggregator	Score
Metacritic	63/100

Review scores
Publication	Score
1Up.com	B
Edge	6/10
Electronic Gaming Monthly	6.83/10
Famitsu	29/40
Game Informer	6.25/10
GameSpot	6.9/10
GameZone	6.9/10
IGN	7/10
Official U.S. PlayStation Magazine	7.5/10
PlayStation: The Official Magazine	7/10

Bounty Hounds received "mixed" reviews according to video game review aggregator platform Metacritic. In Japan, Famitsu gave it a score of one eight, one seven, one six, and one eight, for a total of 29 out of 40.
