= VG Entertainment =

Ukrainian video game developer

VG Entertainment Ltd
- Formerly: Vostok Games (2012–2023)
- Company type: Private
- Industry: Video games
- Predecessor: GSC Game World
- Founded: March 2012; 14 years ago
- Founder: Oleg Yavorsky
- Headquarters: Kyiv, Ukraine
- Key people: Oleg Yavorsky (marketing manager)
- Products: Survarium
- Number of employees: 40 (2013)
- Website: vgentertainment.com

VG Entertainment Ltd (formerly Vostok Games) is a Ukrainian video game developer based in Kyiv. The company was founded in March 2012 by former employees of GSC Game World, including Oleg Yavorsky, after GSC had been shut down. The company developed the battle royale game Fear the Wolves (2019) and is working on Survarium, a free-to-play shooter game in early access since 2015.

== History ==
On 9 December 2011, Sergiy Grygorovych shut down his video game development company, GSC Game World. Following the closure, Oleg Yavorsky, who had been GSC's public relations manager, and several other former GSC employees set out to create a game on their own. They contacted several investors in Ukraine and Russia, but none had a large enough budget to fund the development of a game on the same scale as S.T.A.L.K.E.R. 2, which had been cancelled with GSC's demise. Consequently, the development team lowered their ambition for the game to a free-to-play multiplayer shooter game for personal computers. This led several investors to step forward and, in March 2012, the team came in contact with Vostok Ventures, which was looking for a game development team. An agreement between the two parties was reached within two weeks, and Vostok Games was founded that same month, shortly after which the company settled in offices in an industrial park in Kyiv. In September 2013, Vostok Games employed 40 former GSC employees in these offices. Yavorsky acts as the studio's marketing manager.

Vostok Games' first project became Survarium, which it released into early access in 2015. It also created Fear the Wolves, a battle royale game set in Chernobyl, in 2019. In March 2022, shortly after the start of the Russian invasion of Ukraine, Vostok Games put the development of Survarium on hold to ensure that its developers were safe. In July 2023, the company rebranded as VG Entertainment and announced that it was working on a new game.

== Games developed ==
Year	Title	Platform(s)	Publisher(s)	Ref.
2015 (early access)	Survarium	Windows	Vostok Games	
2019	Fear the Wolves	Windows	Focus Home Interactive	
