= AppyParking =

Technology company

AppyWay
- Formerly: AppyParking / Yellow Line Parking Ltd
- Type: Private
- Industry: Transportation
- Founded: 2013
- Founders: Dan Hubert
- Headquarters: Farringdon, London, United Kingdom
- Area served: London, UK-wide
- Brands: AppyParking, Yellow Line Parking
- Number of employees: 56

AppyWay (formerly AppyParking and Yellow Line Parking) is a technology company that provides parking apps and services for drivers. It was founded in London in 2013 by Dan Hubert initially under the name of Yellow Line Parking. It produces software that shows on-street and off-street parking options in major cities in the UK. The app is available on both Android and iOS. There is also a paid-for enterprise app, AppyParking Pro, which is a software as a service aimed at businesses with fleets.

== History ==
AppyParking was founded by Dan Hubert, a former advertising creative in 2012. Hubert started to contact every London borough and digitize their Controlled Parking Zones from basic PDF maps. Originally named Yellow Line Parking, dealing only with single yellow line parking restrictions, the company was expanded and rebranded as AppyParking in 2014.

In late 2014, the company was part of the Microsoft Ventures Accelerator programme in London, during which Eric Requena, the company's chief technology officer, was advised to revise much of the application code.

In December 2014, AppyParking launched an enterprise app aimed at commercial fleets, and at the CES 2015 in January 2015 Ford announced a partnership with the company. Later in the year, the company ran a one-month trial in Westminster, London with Vodafone xone and Pimlico Plumbers. When a driver located a parking space with the help of the app, he clicked a button in the app when he arrived and simply drove away later, being billed only for the time parked. This was made possible by the sensors already built into parking bays.

Since January 2016, AppyParking provides a feature that shows the nearest and cheapest petrol stations anywhere in the UK.

In September 2016, founder Dan Hubert appeared on BBC business show Dragon's Den seeking investment to expand the service, valuing the company at £10m ($13.34m) based on a 2% equity offered for a sum of £200,000 ($266815.5). He was unsuccessful after declining two offers from Peter Jones and Nick Jenkins, who instead valued the company at £1m ($1.33m).

In July 2019 AppyParking closed a Series A round of investment worth £7.6m ($10.14m) from investors including Hyundai Motor Company and Sumitomo Corporation, led by London-based venture capital firm, West Hill Capital. The company has raised a total of £11m ($14.67m) as of 2019 and is now valued at £50m ($66.7m) after its 2019 round.

As of 2019, AppyParking hosts the largest dataset of the UK's kerbside restrictions, with over 450 UK towns and cities mapped within the AppyParking mobile app and Kerbside API.

AppyParking rebranded as AppyWay in September 2019.

AppyWay launched its second Smart City Parking scheme in the town of Halifax in October 2019.

== Technology ==
AppyWay uses Google Maps overlays to display areas, and projects its dataset in the form of pins. The app retrieves the user's location and the present date and time to provide a list of prices, and connects with routing apps like Maps and Waze to direct the user to the parking site.
