= JOY Entertainment =

Vietnamese mobile game company

- Company type: Joint Stock Company
- Industry: Game mobile developer
- Founded: April 21, 2012
- Headquarters: 4th Mekong Tower Building, 235 Cong Hoa st., Ward 13, Dist. Tan Binh, Ho Chi Minh City; Vietnam
- Key people: Mr. Le Giang Anh - CEO; Tran Quang HUY - Creative Director; Hoang Ngoc Toan - CTO; Nguyen Huu Le Trong Tin - Lead Programmer
- Products: Mobile Game: Captain Strike, Auto Racing: Upstream, Amazing Kick, Troll Running, Blocks Buddies, Kupid, Clash of Allstars (coming soon), Dream Life (coming soon); Technology: JAB Engine
- Number of employees: Over 40
- Website: joy-entertainment.com

JOY Entertainment is a Vietnamese mobile game company oriented to become a full-fledged mobile game developer and publisher. This game company was founded on April 21, 2012 by four young founders with previous experiences about game making at Gameloft SEA – Le Giang Anh, Tran Quang Huy, Hoang Ngoc Toan, and Nguyen Huu Le Trong Tin.

In early times, company made simple casual games such as Auto Racing: Upstream, Amazing Kick, Troll Running, Blocks Buddies, and Kupid to train basic and advanced skills for developers. In 2014, they shipped their breakthrough hit Captain Strike that attracted over 3 million users.

== History ==
JOY Entertainment was founded on April 21, 2012 by four game developers in HCMC small office.

=== 2012–2013 ===
1. Company started their activities with the original idea being develop casual games to cultivate more experience. And embark on making their first game, Kupid.

=== 2013–2014 ===
1. This company completed Kupid - a simple casual game.
2. Next, company was continues developing new games Blocks Buddies and Bounce on iOS operating system of the iPhone, iPod Touch and iPad on August 15, 2013.

=== 2014–2015 ===
1. Continuous released three quality game: Troll Running, Auto Racing, Amazing Kick.
2. Change location of office to Mekong Tower Building.
3. Implementation and completion game, Captain Strike.

=== 2015–2016 ===
1. Captain Strike game title is exported to foreign countries with the transfer contract for a publisher in Thailand.
2. Won the 1st prize in the Asia Incubate contest Camp in Singapore with the idea of mobile game Clash of Allstars.
3. Continue with important projects: Clash of Allstars and Dream Life.

== Products ==
=== Developed games ===
Title	Year	Platform(s)	Genre
Kupid	2013	Mobile	Casual
Blocks Buddies	2013	Mobile	Puzzle
Troll Running	2014	Mobile	Casual
Auto Racing: Upstream	2014	Mobile	Action
Amazing Kick	2014	Mobile	Sport
Captain Strike	2014	Mobile	Action
Clash of Allstars	In development	Mobile	Strategy
Dream Life	In development	Mobile	Casual

=== Technology ===
In the process of developing game, they have created an engine to serve for their work named JAB Engine. This is the first engine developed by Vietnam.

== Copyright ==
On June 5, 2015 they completed the registration of the Captain Strike brand product with code number 2013/2015/QTG.

== Awards ==
February 26, 2015 A mobile game product under the name of Clash of Allstars have topped the competition in Asia Incubate Camp organized by Incubate Fund (Japan).
