= XPEC Entertainment =

Taiwanese video game developer and publisher

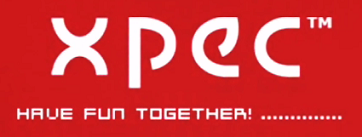
- Industry: Video games
- Founded: August 2000
- Headquarters: Taipei, Taiwan
- Number of locations: Taipei, ROC; Shanghai, PRC; Beijing, PRC; Suzhou, PRC
- Number of employees: 787(2013)
- Website: www.xpec.com.tw

XPEC Entertainment is a Taiwanese video game developer and publisher based in Taipei. It was founded in 2000.

== Games ==
Year	Title	System	Publisher
2003	Black Stone: Magic & Steel	Xbox	Xicat Interactive; Idea Factory
2004	Daemon Vector	Microsoft Windows; Xbox	XPEC Entertainment; Frogster Interactive
2005	Spectral Force Chronicle	PlayStation 2	Idea Factory
2005	Hello Kitty: Roller Rescue	Microsoft Windows; GameCube; PlayStation 2 Xbox	XPEC Entertainment; Empire Interactive; Namco; Sanrio
2006	Spectral Force 3: Innocent Rage	Xbox 360	Idea Factory
2006	Bounty Hounds	PlayStation Portable	Namco
2006	Realm of the Dead	PlayStation 2	Midas Interactive Entertainment
2008	Kung Fu Panda	PlayStation 2 Wii	Activision
2008	The Hardy Boys: The Hidden Theft	Microsoft Windows; Wii	DreamCatcher Games
2010	Shrek Forever After	Microsoft Windows; PlayStation 3 Xbox 360; Wii	Activision
2011	Skylanders: Spyro's Adventure	Microsoft Windows; OS X PlayStation 3 Xbox 360	Activision
2016	Final Fantasy XV	PlayStation 4 Xbox One	Square Enix
2016	O! My Genesis	PlayStation 4	
2018	Final Fantasy XV: Pocket Edition	Android iOS	Square Enix
