= Torpex Games =

Game development studio in Washington, US

Torpex Games, LLC.
- Company type: Video game developer
- Industry: Video games
- Founded: 2005
- Defunct: 2012
- Headquarters: Bellevue, Washington, United States
- Key people: Bill Dugan, Jamie Fristrom
- Website: www.torpexgames.com

Torpex Games was a game development studio located in Bellevue, Washington, United States.

The studio was notable because their video game Schizoid was the first Xbox Live Arcade title to utilize the Microsoft framework, XNA Game Studio Express.

Torpex Games was founded by industry veterans Bill Dugan and Jamie Fristrom.

== Games ==
- Schizoid (2008)
- Bejeweled Blitz LIVE (2011)
