= Schizoid (video game) =

2008 video game

- Developer: Torpex Games
- Publisher: Microsoft Game Studios
- Engine: Microsoft XNA
- Platform: Xbox 360 (XBLA)
- Release: July 9, 2008
- Genre: Action
- Modes: Single-player, multiplayer

Schizoid is an action game which focuses on teamwork. Players must co-operate to protect each other from barrages of glowing enemies. The title was developed by Torpex Games and launched on Xbox Live Arcade on July 9, 2008.

Schizoid was nominated for two Xbox Live Arcade 2008 awards: "Best Original Game" and "Best Co-Operative Multiplayer Game". Penny Arcade awarded Schizoid a place in their PAX 10 awards, as one of the best independently developed games of the year "in terms of gameplay and 'fun factor'."

On the Xbox 360, Xbox Live Marketplace shut down on July 29 2024, meaning Schizoid is no longer downloadable on either the Xbox 360 or any newer generations of Xbox console.

== Gameplay ==
The Crossbreeding level

Two player-controlled ships, colored red and blue, are maneuvered around a game level. Red and blue enemies charge at the ships of the opposite color. If a player ship touches an enemy of the same color, the enemy is destroyed; but if the enemy is of the opposite color, the player ship is destroyed. When all red and blue enemies are cleared from the level, the level ends and players begin the next level.

Two single-player game modes are available: Wingman Bot Training, in which the player controls the blue ship and a bot controls the red ship; and Uberschizoid, in which the player controls both ships simultaneously. One multiplayer game mode is available, playable either as an Xbox Live game over an Internet connection, or with two players at the same console in "Local Co-op" game mode.

The only control used on the game controller during the game is the left thumbstick, unless playing in Uberschizoid game mode, in which case the player uses both thumbsticks to control the two ships.

During gameplay, the two ships must work closely together to clear enemies from the levels. Each player ship alone is completely vulnerable to enemies of the opposite color; only the other player ship can provide a rescue.

Game progress is saved at a checkpoint after completing a "chamber" of seven levels before the players' 10 lives are exhausted. If the players complete any level without losing any lives, the players earn a "gold star" for that level. In subsequent games, any time the player goes through that chamber, the game will automatically skip past any level that has a gold star, making it more likely the player will be able to finish the chamber before his 10 lives are exhausted. Schizoid has 119 levels, followed by a sequence of "Infinity Chamber" levels, which are randomly generated by the game.

Torpex Games calls Schizoid "the most co-op game ever" because of the tight cooperation required to play multiplayer games. (Official Xbox Magazine wrote of this claim, "It ain't lying.") The game's "Uberschizoid" single-player game mode is apparently intended for hardcore gamers; IGN claimed of Uberschizoid, "Your brain will never be the same."

This mechanic requires continuous coordination between players, as survival depends on correctly interacting with enemies of matching colors while avoiding opposite ones.

== Development history ==
Schizoid is notable for being the first Xbox Live Arcade game built using XNA Game Studio Express; Aegis Wing had been created using pre-XNA tools.

Development of the game started in September 2006. The first prototype of core gameplay was completed in just four days.

Richard Garfield, famous for creating Magic: The Gathering, helped in the design of the game. The game was developed by a team of 7 people.

== Reception ==
- Team Xbox - 8.1
- IGN - 7.8

The game was given mostly positive reviews. IGN gave a score of 7.8, and Team Xbox gave a score of 8.1
