= Appy Entertainment =

American video game developer

- Company type: Video game developer
- Founded: October 31, 2008
- Founder: Chris Ulm, Farzad Varahramyan, Paul O'Connor, Rick Olafsson, Emmanuel Valdez
- Defunct: 2014

Appy Entertainment, Inc., was an American video-game developer focusing primarily on mobile and tablet devices. Their most popular app was FaceFighter. The company seems to have since shutdown around 2014.

== Company information ==
Appy Entertainment was founded on October 31, 2008, by Chris Ulm, Farzad Varahramyan, Paul O'Connor, Rick Olafsson, and Emmanuel Valdez - all former executives of High Moon Studios.

Appy was located at their "Secret Worldwide Headquarters", a loft-style office above an Irish Pub in Carlsbad, California.

Appy released a number of apps with over 20 million downloads.

In September 2011, they reached a milestone of 10 million iOS downloaded on the FaceFighter app.

== Product pricing ==
While Appy began with a traditional premium pricing approach for their games, at some point switched to a free-to-play model. They also changed the pricing model of existing games like Trucks & Skulls from premium to free-to-play monetization.
