= Kiloo =

Danish games development company

Kiloo Games
- Type: Privately held company
- Industry: Video games
- Founded: 2000; 26 years ago
- Headquarters: Aarhus, Denmark
- Key people: Jacob Møller; Simon Møller
- Number of employees: 80
- Website: www.kiloogames.com

Kiloo Games (commonly known as Kiloo and stylized in all caps) is a Danish company that formerly focused on video game development. It was founded in 2000 by Jacob Møller, with a focus on developing entertainment content for game console and handheld devices. In 2008, he was joined by his brother, Simon Møller.

Kiloo's best known game, Subway Surfers, was released in the spring of 2012 and was developed in cooperation with SYBO Games. In September, the game made its way to Android and gathered even more enthusiastic players. One month after the Android release, Subway Surfers made it into the top 20 growing Facebook apps by monthly active users. In July 2014, the game exceeded five hundred million downloads across all platforms. In September 2015, the download numbers reached 1 billion.

== History ==
Kiloo was founded in 2000, in a small apartment in Aarhus, Denmark, as a two-person company. In 2002, the partnership dissolved and Kiloo changed into a private company. In the same year, Kiloo won the Nokia Mobile Challenge in the games category ahead of 500 competing companies, with their game Popstar, built on a Tamagotchi-like concept of managing the career and basic needs of an upcoming pop music star.

Kiloo later entered an agreement with THQ Wireless to develop the game Worms for mobile. Kiloo also cooperated with ITE on the development and distribution of mobile content based on the TV and game character Hugo. By 2004, the Hugo games had been bought by 1 million people.

Between 2006 and 2009, Kiloo had the exclusive mobile rights for the Lego brand worldwide. In 2007, Kiloo broke into Børsen's "Fast Track 100", which placed it in the league of Denmark's fastest growing private companies. In the same year, Kiloo acquired the exclusive rights for Whac-a-Mole worldwide with reference to developing and selling Whac-a-Mole mobile content. In 2008, Kiloo raised capital from Danish VC FirmaInvest for further growth.

In 2008, Kiloo started developing mobile applications alongside game development. These include: Issuu Mobile, a magazine reader for iPhone; JokeToons, an animated videocontent for iPhone; and games licensed from Wham-O. In 2009, Kiloo licensed the full suite of Wham-O rights for mobile (HackySack, SuperBall, Frisbee and Hula Hoop), which so far has resulted in Frisbee Forever and Frisbee Forever 2. In 2010, Kiloo Games announced a new original IP called Zoonies - Escape from Makatu for Nintendo DSIWare. It was sponsored by the New Danish Screen. In 2011, Kiloo released Frisbee Forever and BulletTime HD. In 2012, the endless running game Subway Surfers was released in co-production with Sybo Games, and Kiloo continued the series with Frisbee Forever 2.

In early 2020, Kiloo stopped working on Subway Surfers. In June 2023, Kiloo had laid off its staff and closed doors. The company did not cease to exist, but all work on mobile game development ceased. As of 2026, Kiloo hosts web-based games on their website.

== Kiloo Groups ==
In 2013, Kiloo Group was founded by integrating three subsidiary companies in the Kiloo family: Manatee, Katoni, and GivingTales.

=== Manatee ===
The company was established in 2012, and focuses on apps development. Customers include McDonald's Denmark. The McDonald's Coinoffers app was developed in cooperation with DDB Copenhagen. The campaign, including the app, won gold and silver in the categories "Integrated Campaigns", "Events & Digital Events", "Digital Campaigns" and "Brand Driven Apps & Utilities" at the CCA 2012. The campaign won also a Bronze Lion in the category "Best Integrated Campaign Led by Mobile" at Cannes Lions 2012 and another Bronze Lion in the category "Best Use of Integrated Media".

=== Katoni ===
Katoni ApS was established in 2014 and specializes in the development of online shopping portals. In June 2014, Katoni launched Katoni.dk, a shopping portal for fashion. In 2016, Katoni expanded to Norway (Katoni.no) and in 2017 to Finland (Katoni.fi).

=== GivingTales ===
GivingTales was a cooperation between Kiloo and evershift. The project was established in 2012 to develop an app with versions of popular Hans Christian Andersen fairy tales for children. The tales are narrated by actors and celebrities. The app was developed in Budapest (Hungary), and it was released in June 2015, on App Store, Google Play Store and Windows Phone 8 Store with the following stories:

- "The Princess and the Pea", narrated by Roger Moore
- "The Ugly Duckling", narrated by Stephen Fry
- "The Little Match Girl", narrated by Ewan McGregor
- "The Emperor’s New Clothes", narrated by Joan Collins
- "The Snow Queen", narrated by Joanna Lumley
- "Little Claus and Big Claus", narrated by Michael Caine
- "The Little Mermaid", narrated by David Walliams
- "Thumbelina", narrated by Charlotte Rampling
- "It's Quite True!", narrated by Paul McKenna
- "The Nightingale", narrated by Michael Ball

== List of games ==
- Popstar (2002)
- Hugo: Black Diamond Fever for mobile (2004)
- Maya the Bee and Friends for mobile (2006)
- Happy Tree Friends Spin (2008)
- Zoonies - Escape from Makatu (2010)
- Frisbee Forever (2011)
- Bullet Time HD (2011)
- Frisbee Forever 2 (2012)
- Subway Surfers (2012; co-developed by SYBO)
- Smash Champs (2014)
- Stormblades (2015; co-produced by Emerald City Games)
- Tesla Tubes (2016)
- Dawnbringer
- Whac-a-mole for mobile
- Commodore 64 for mobile
