= Index of Windows games (O) =

This is an index of Microsoft Windows games.

This list has been split into multiple pages. Please use the Table of Contents to browse it.

Title	Released	Developer	Publisher
O.D.T.	1998	Psygnosis	Psygnosis
O.R.B: Off-World Resource Base	2002	Strategy First	Strategy First, Mindscape
Oasis	2005	Mind Control Software	PlayFirst
Obscure	2004	Hydravision Entertainment	DreamCatcher Interactive
Obscure II	2008	Hydravision Entertainment	Playlogic Entertainment
Observation	2019	No Code	Devolver Digital
Observer	2017	Bloober Team	Aspyr
Obsidian	1996	Rocket Science Games	SegaSoft
The Occupation	2019	White Paper Games	Humble Bundle
Oceanhorn: Monster of Uncharted Seas	2015	Cornfox & Bros.	FDG Entertainment
Oceanhorn 2: Knights of the Lost Realm	2017	Cornfox & Bros.	FDG Entertainment
Octogeddon	2018	All Yes Good	All Yes Good
Oddworld: Abe's Exoddus	1998	Oddworld Inhabitants	GT Interactive
Oddworld: Abe's Oddysee	1997	Oddworld Inhabitants	GT Interactive
Oddworld: New 'n' Tasty!	2015	Just Add Water	Oddworld Inhabitants
Odyssey: The Search for Ulysses	2000	Cryo Interactive	Cryo Interactive
Of Orcs and Men	2012	Cyanide, Spiders	Focus Home Interactive
Off-Road Redneck Racing	2001	Rage Software	Interplay Entertainment
Offworld Trading Company	2016	Mohawk Games	Stardock
Oil Rush	2012	UNIGINE Company	UNIGINE Company, Iceberg Interactive
Old World	2021	Mohawk Games	Hooded Horse
The Omega Stone	2003	Omni Creative	DreamCatcher Interactive
One Must Fall: Battlegrounds	2003	Diversions Entertainment	Diversions Publishing
One Piece: Pirate Warriors 3	2015	Omega Force	Bandai Namco Entertainment
One Piece: Burning Blood	2016	Spike Chunsoft	Bandai Namco Entertainment
OnEscapee	1997	Invictus Games, Ltd.	Sadeness Software
Onimusha 3: Demon Siege	2004	Capcom	Capcom
Onimusha: Warlords	2001	Capcom	Capcom
Only Up!	2023	SCKR Games	SCKR Games
Oolite	2006	Giles Williams	
Open Roads	2024	Open Roads Team	Annapurna Interactive
OpenArena	2005	OpenArena team	
Operation Blockade	2002	Screaming Games	Infogrames
Operation Flashpoint: Cold War Crisis	2001	Bohemia Interactive Studio	Codemasters
Operation Flashpoint: Dragon Rising	2009	Codemasters	Codemasters
Operation Neptune	1995	The Learning Company	The Learning Company
Operation Sanctuary	2003	August	August
Operation: Matriarchy	2005	MADIA Entertainment	Buka Entertainment
The Operative: No One Lives Forever	2000	Monolith Productions	Fox Interactive
Opsys	2000	Lemon Interactive	[hyper]media limited
The Orange Box	2007	Valve	Valve
Orbiter	2000	Martin Schweiger	
Orcs Must Die!	2011	Robot Entertainment	Robot Entertainment
Order of Battle: Pacific	2015	The Artistocrats	Slitherine Software
Order of War	2009	Wargaming	Square Enix
The Oregon Trail	1996	MECC	Broderbund
Oregon Trail II	1995	MECC	Softkey
The Oregon Trail 3rd Edition	1997	MECC	MECC
The Oregon Trail 4th Edition	2001	MECC	The Learning Company
Ori and the Blind Forest	2015	Moon Studios	Microsoft Studios
Original War	2001	Altar Interactive	Virgin Interactive
Orion: Prelude	2014	Spiral Game Studios	Spiral Game Studios
Orly's Draw-A-Story	1997	ToeJam & Earl Productions	Broderbund
Osiris: New Dawn	2023	Fenix Fire Entertainment	Fenix Fire Entertainment
Osmos	2009	Hemisphere Games	Hemisphere Games
Othercide	2020	Lightbulb Crew	Focus Home Interactive
Otto Matic	2001	Pangea Software	Aspyr Media
Out of the Park Baseball	2008	OOTP Developments	OOTP Developments
Outcast	1999	Appeal	Infogrames
Outcast: A New Beginning	2024	Appeal Studios	THQ Nordic
Outer Wilds	2019	Mobius Digital	Annapurna Interactive
The Outer Worlds	2019	Obsidian Entertainment	Private Division
The Outforce	2000	O3 Games	Pan Interactive, Strategy First
Outlast	2013	Red Barrels	Red Barrels
Outlast 2	2017	Red Barrels	Red Barrels
The Outlast Trials	2024	Red Barrels	Red Barrels
Outlaw Golf	2002	Hypnotix	Global Star Software
Outlaws	1997	LucasArts	LucasArts
Outlive	2000	Continuum Entertainment	Continuum Entertainment, Take-Two Interactive
Outpost 2: Divided Destiny	1997	Dynamix	Sierra On-Line
Outpost Kaloki	2004	NinjaBee	Microsoft Game Studios
Outriders	2021	People Can Fly	Square Enix
OutRun 2006: Coast 2 Coast	2006	Sumo Digital	Sega
Outward	2019	Nine Dots	Deep Silver
Outwars	1998	SingleTrac	Microsoft
Over the Hedge	2006	Edge of Reality	Activision
Overboard!	1997	Psygnosis	Psygnosis
Overclocked: A History of Violence	2008	House of Tales	Lighthouse Interactive
Overcooked	2016	Ghost Town Games	Team17
Overload	2018	Revival Productions	Revival Productions
Overlord	2007	Triumph Studios	Codemasters
Overlord II	2009	Triumph Studios	Codemasters
Overlord: Fellowship of Evil	2015	Triumph Studios	Codemasters
Overlord: Raising Hell	2008	Triumph Studios	Codemasters
Overwatch	2016	Blizzard Entertainment	Blizzard Entertainment
Overwatch 2	2023	Blizzard Entertainment	Blizzard Entertainment
