= List of PC games (O) =

The following page is an alphabetical section from the list of PC games.

== O ==
Name	Developer	Publisher	Genre(s)	Operating system(s)	Date released
Olympic Games Tokyo 2020 – The Official Video Game	Sega	Sega	Sports	Microsoft Windows	22 June 2021
OneShot	Liitle Cat Feet	Degica	Adventure, Puzzle	Microsoft Windows	8 December 2016
On Your Tail	Memorable Games	The Powell Group	Mystery adventure, life simulation	Microsoft Windows	21 November 2024
Only Up!	SCKR Games	SCKR Games	Platformer, Indie	Microsoft Windows	24 May 2023
Operation Flashpoint: Cold War Crisis	Bohemia Interactive	Codemasters	Tactical shooter	Microsoft Windows	22 June 2001
Operation Flashpoint: Resistance	Bohemia Interactive	Codemasters	Tactical shooter	Microsoft Windows	10 July 2002
Orcs Must Die!	Robot Entertainment	Robot Entertainment	Action, Tower Defense	Microsoft Windows	12 October 2011
Orcs Must Die! 2	Robot Entertainment	Robot Entertainment	Action, Tower Defense	Microsoft Windows	30 July 2012
Order of War	Wargaming	Square Enix	Strategy	Microsoft Windows	22 September 2009
Ori and the Blind Forest	Moon Studios	Microsoft Studios	Platform	Microsoft Windows	11 March 2015
Ori and the Will of the Wisps	Moon Studios	Xbox Game Studios	Platform	Microsoft Windows	11 March 2020
osu!	Dean Herbert	PPY Developments PTY	Rhythm, music	Microsoft Windows, macOS	16 September 2007
Out of the Park Baseball	Sports Interactive	Sports Interactive	Sports	Microsoft Windows	26 March 2006
Outcast	Appeal	Infogrames	Adventure, Action	Microsoft Windows	31 August 1999
Outlast	Red Barrels	Red Barrels	Action	Microsoft Windows, Linux, macOS	4 September 2013
Outlast 2	Red Barrels	Red Barrels	Survival horror	Microsoft Windows	25 April 2017
Overcooked	Ghost Town Games	Team17	Action, Indie, Simulation	Microsoft Windows	2 August 2016
Overcooked! 2	Ghost Town Games	Team17	Action, Indie, Simulation	Microsoft Windows	7 August 2018
Overgrowth	Wolfire Games	Wolfire Games	Action	Microsoft Windows, Linux, macOS	17 September 2008
Overwatch	Blizzard Entertainment	Blizzard Entertainment	Action	Microsoft Windows	24 May 2016
Overwatch 2	Blizzard Entertainment	Blizzard Entertainment	Hero shooter	Microsoft Windows	4 October 2022
Outer Wilds	Mobius Digital	Annapurna Interactive	Action-adventure, exploration	Microsoft Windows	28 May 2019
Oxenfree	Night School Studio	Night School Studio	Graphic adventure	Microsoft Windows, Linux, macOS	15 January 2016
