= Colleen Clinkenbeard =

American voice actress (born 1980)

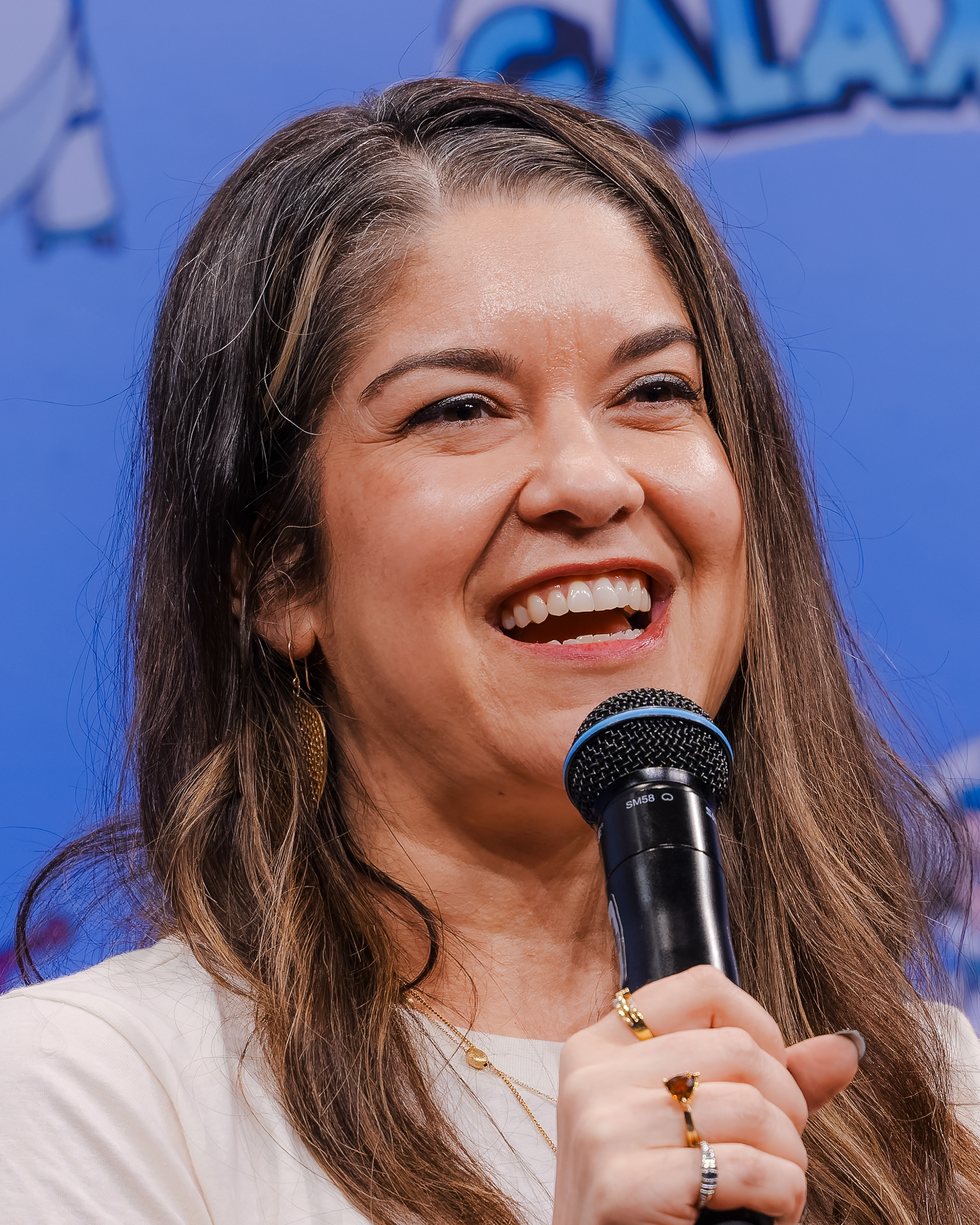
- Clinkenbeard in 2026
- Born: Colleen Smith Clinkenbeard; April 13, 1980 (age 46); Louisiana, U.S.
- Occupations: Voice actress; ADR director; line producer; writer
- Years active: 2004–present
- Agent: Linda McAlister
- Spouse: Patric Carroll (m. 2012)
- Children: 1
- Family: Bonny Clinkenbeard

Colleen Smith Clinkenbeard (born April 13, 1980) is an American voice actress, ADR director, line producer, and writer. One of her major starts was as the English voice provider for Rachel Moore in the long-running detective series Case Closed. She then later served as the Co-ADR director on Fullmetal Alchemist, which aired on Adult Swim in 2004. She has since starred in many popular anime dubs, including as Monkey D. Luffy in One Piece, Erza Scarlet in Fairy Tail, Moka Akashiya in Rosario + Vampire, Risa Aoyanagi in Psycho-Pass, Maria in Burst Angel, Son Gohan in Dragon Ball Z Kai , and Momo Yaoyorozu in My Hero Academia. She also voiced Kisara Nanjo in Kenichi: The Mightiest Disciple.

== Career ==
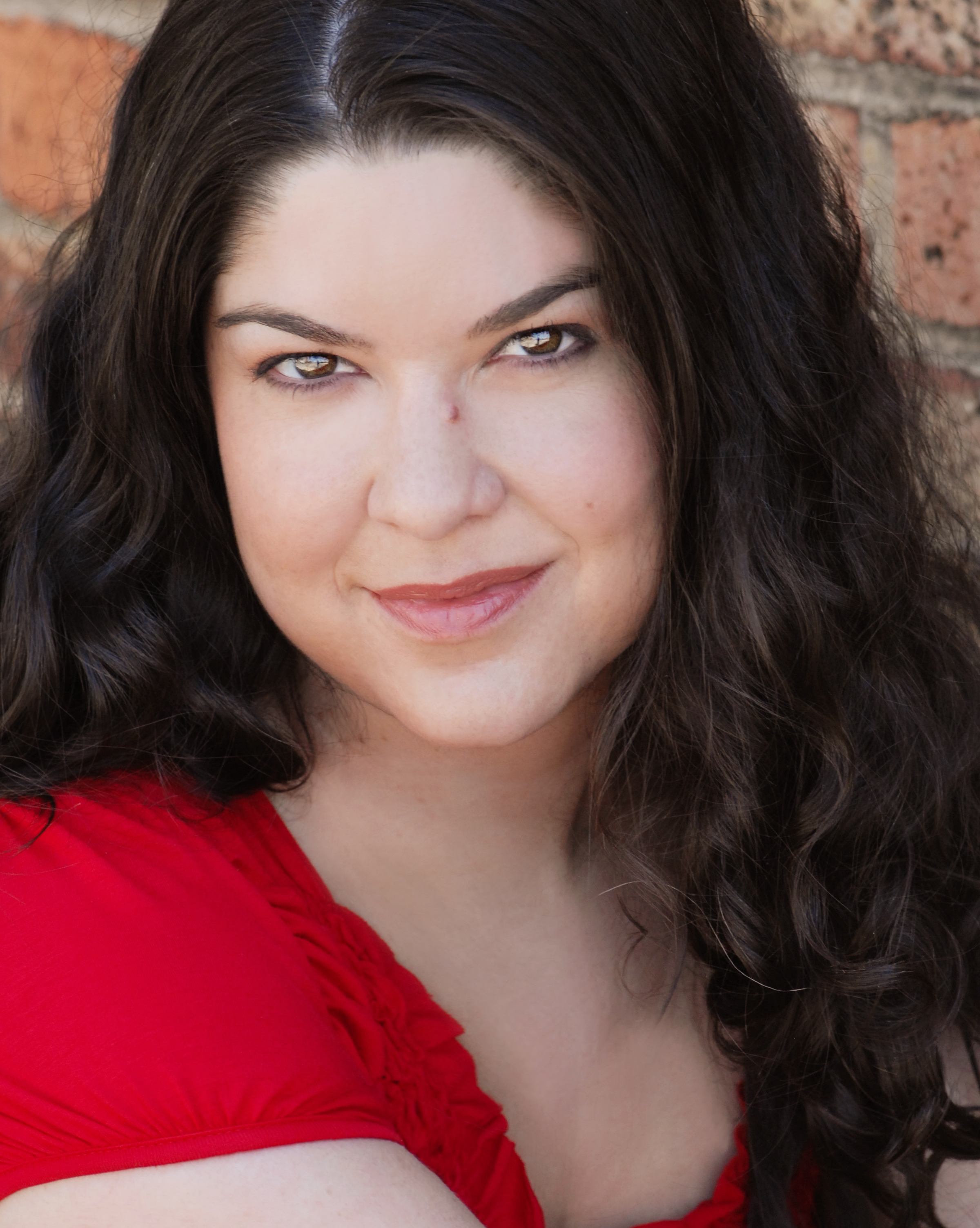
Clinkenbeard in 2011

As a stage actress in Dallas, Clinkenbeard got involved in voice-over when fellow voice actress Laura Bailey brought her to Funimation for an audition. Her first voice role was in Dragon Ball GT; her first lead role was Éclair in Kiddy Grade. Midway through the Kiddy Grade series, director Justin Cook appointed Clinkenbeard as the ADR director for the rest of the episodes. Her other major role early in her career was Rachel Moore in the detective anime show Case Closed. She would later direct along with Mike McFarland on Fullmetal Alchemist which came out in November 2004 on Cartoon Network's Adult Swim programming block.

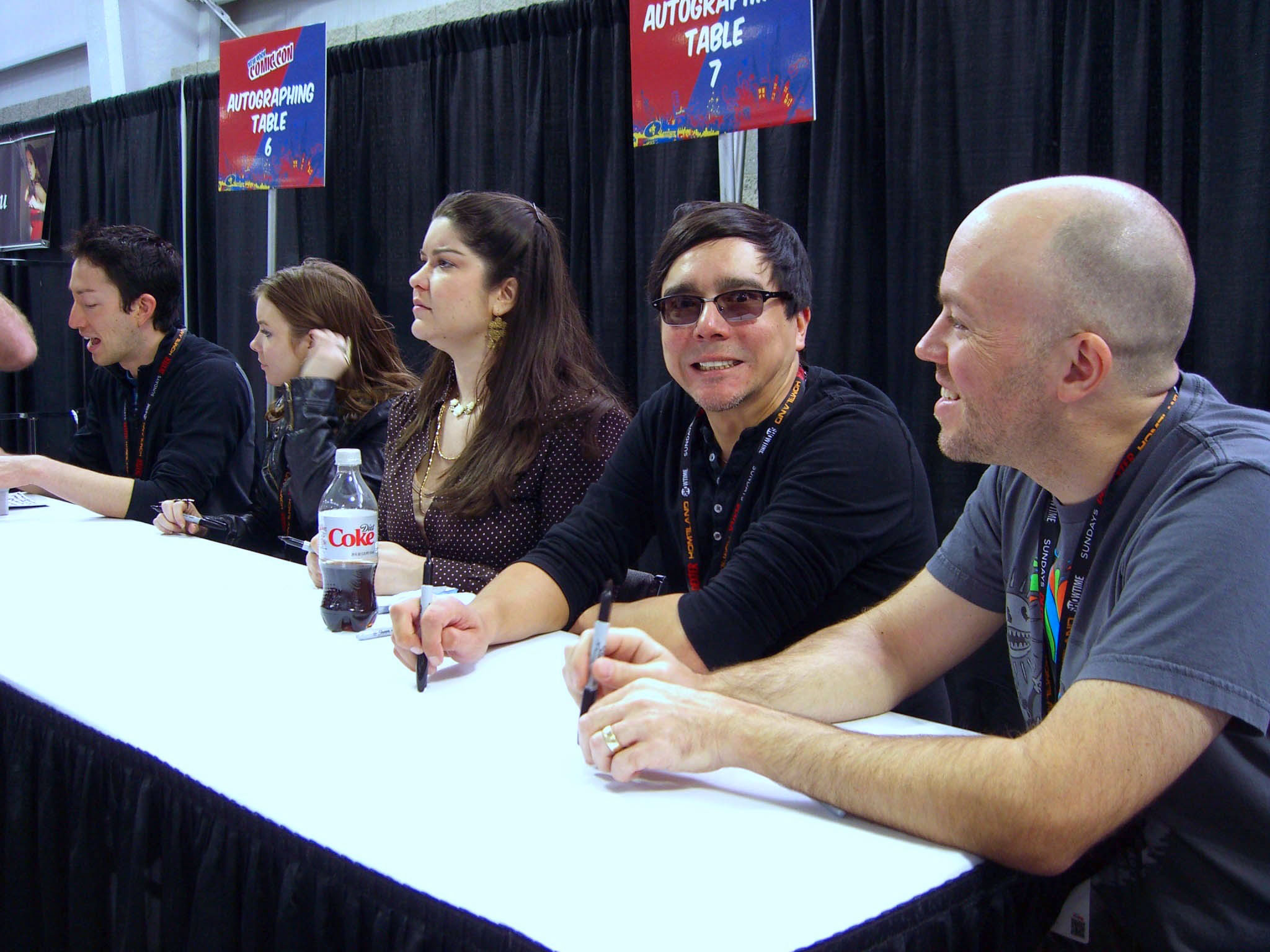
Clinkenbeard with other cast members at a table reading for Fairy Tail

Clinkenbeard went on to provide the voices of Monkey D. Luffy in One Piece, Erza Scarlet in Fairy Tail, Riza Hawkeye in Fullmetal Alchemist and Fullmetal Alchemist: Brotherhood, Moka Akashiya's inner personality in Rosario + Vampire, Yuko Ichihara in xxxHolic, and Elsie Crimson and Mother in Edens Zero.

Outside of anime dubs, she's also provided the voice of Lilith in the Borderlands video game series, while also voicing character roles in RWBY and Mao Mao: Heroes of Pure Heart on Cartoon Network.

== Personal life ==
Clinkenbeard and voice actress Laura Bailey were roommates while working at Funimation. She married Patric Carroll in 2012, and they have a son. Her sister Bonnie is an ADR script writer at Funimation.

== Filmography ==
=== Anime ===
List of dubbing performances and production work in anime
Year	Series	Voice role	Crew role	Notes	Source
2004	Kiddy Grade	Éclair	ADR director	First lead role	
2004–09	Case Closed	Rachel Moore	ADR director		
2004	Dragon Ball Z	Princess Snake		Funimation remix version	Resume
2004	Dragon Ball GT	Colm			
2004	Dragon Ball GT: A Hero's Legacy	Nurse #2			CA
2004	Fullmetal Alchemist	Riza Hawkeye, Rosé Thomas	ADR director, ADR script		CA
2004	Spiral	Suzuki		Eps. 5, 16	CA
2005	Burst Angel	Maria			
2005	Gunslinger Girl	Priscilla			CA
2005	Kodocha	Misako Kurata	ADR director and script writer		
2005	Samurai 7	Kirara Mikumari	ADR script writer		CA
2005	Sakura Taisen: Ecole de Paris	Glycine Bleumer	ADR director		CA
2006	Basilisk: The Kōga Ninja Scrolls	Hotarubi			CA
2006	Black Cat	Tim			
2006	Diamond Daydreams	Nurse Yuuki			CA
2006	Moon Phase	Kouhei's Mom	Line producer, ADR director, ADR script		
2006	Negima!	Sakurako Shīna, Shizuna Minamoto	ADR director Line producer	Both TV series and specials	
2006	Rumbling Hearts	Mitsuki Hayase			
2006	Crayon Shin-chan	Himawari "Hima" Nohara, Masao	ADR writer	Funimation dub	CA
2006	Speed Grapher	Kaoru Koganei			CA
2006	Trinity Blood	Esther Blanchett			CA
2007	Beck: Mongolian Chop Squad	Ishiguro Izumi			CA
2007	Beet the Vandel Buster	Beet			CA
2007	Glass Fleet	Rachel			CA
2007	Murder Princess	Falis (a.k.a. Alita)			CA
2007	Mushishi	Setsu		Ep. 14	
2007–present	One Piece	Monkey D. Luffy, Moodie, Muret, Oars, Nora Gitsune (Fake Chopper), Additional Voices		Funimation dub	
2007	School Rumble	Tae Anegasaki	Line producer	2 seasons + OVA's	CA
2007	SoltyRei	Rose Anderson	ADR script writer		CA
2007	Tsubasa: Reservoir Chronicle	Yuko Ichihara	ADR director Line producer		
2007	Witchblade	Reina Soho			CA
2008	Black Blood Brothers	Mimiko Katsuragi	Line producer		
2008	Claymore	Galatea	ADR director Line producer		
2008	Ga-Rei: Zero	Natsuki Kasuga			
2008	Ghost Hunt	Ayako Matsuzaki			
2008	Kanon (2006 series)	Mishio Amano			CA
2008	Ouran High School Host Club	Éclair Tonnerre, Ritsu Kasanoda (Young)			CA
2008	Shuffle!	Kareha	Line producer		CA
2008	Sasami: Magical Girls Club	Mihoshi			CA
2008	xxxHolic	Yuko Ichihara	Line producer		CA
2009	Initial D	Mako Sato	Line producer	Funimation dub	
2009	Kaze no Stigma	Kirika Tachibana		Funimation dub	
2009	Romeo × Juliet	Cordelia			
2010	Dragon Ball Z Kai	Gohan, Goku (Young), Android 18, Trunks (Baby), Launch			
2010	Fullmetal Alchemist: Brotherhood	Riza Hawkeye, Rosé Thomas			
2010	Rin: Daughters of Mnemosyne	Rin Asogi			
2010–12	Sekirei series	Matsu		Also Pure Engagement and OVAs	
2010	Soul Eater	Marie Mjolnir			
2011–13	Baka and Test series	Yoko Takahashi	ADR director Line producer		
2011	Black Butler	Angela	ADR director, script Line producer		
2011	Chaos;Head	Yua Kusunoki, Mia Kusunoki			
2011	Chrome Shelled Regios	Leerin Marfs	Line producer		
2011–20	Fairy Tail	Erza Scarlet			
2011	Hero Tales	Rinmei Shokan			
2011	Rosario + Vampire series	Moka Vamp			
2011	The Sacred Blacksmith	Francesca			
2011	Spice and Wolf II	Diana Rubens	Line producer		
2012	Deadman Wonderland	Makina	Line producer		
2012	Level E	Luna=Mi=Mad・Magura			
2012	Ōkami-san and her Seven Companions	Otsu Tsurugaya	ADR director		
2012	Panty & Stocking with Garterbelt	Scanty Daemon	ADR director		
2012	Shakugan no Shana series	Margery Daw		Seasons 2–3, movie, and OVA	
2012	Shiki	Ritsuko Kunihiro			
2012	Steins;Gate	Coffee Shop Employee	ADR director Line producer		
2013	Aesthetica of a Rogue Hero	Listy	ADR director		
2013	Good Luck Girl!	Momiji			
2013	High School DxD	Xuelan, Shiro	ADR director Line producer		
2014	A Certain Scientific Railgun S	Therestina Kihara Lifeline			
2014	Code:Breaker		ADR director		
2014	Space Dandy	Scarlet			
2015	The Rolling Girls	Masami Utoku	ADR director		
2015	Death Parade	Tria		Ep. 7	
2015	Yurikuma Arashi	Yurika Hakonaka			
2015	Ultimate Otaku Teacher	Tim Bernards Lynn			
2015	Tokyo Ravens		ADR director		
2015	Shomin Sample	Hōko Arisugawa		Eps. 11–12	
2015	Noragami Aragoto	Kazuha, Karuha			
2015	Tokyo Ghoul	Ryōko Fueguchi			
2015	Riddle Story of Devil	Otoya Takechi			
2016	Brothers Conflict	Ema Asahina			
2016	Garo: The Animation	Octavia			
2016	Aokana: Four Rhythm Across The Blue	Kasumi Kurobuchi		Ep. 6	
2016	Dimension W	Rose	Co-ADR Director	Ep. 3	
2016	The Vision of Escaflowne	Millerna Aston		Funimation dub	
2016	Divine Gate	Akane's Mother		Ep. 10	
2016	And You Thought There Is Never a Girl Online?	Ako's Mother		Ep. 5	
2016	Puzzle & Dragons X	Daphness			
2016–25	My Hero Academia	Momo Yaoyorozu / Creati	ADR Director		
2016	Barakamon	Ikue Kōmoto			
2016	Danganronpa 3: The End of Hope's Peak High School series	Chisa Yukizome			
2016	Planetarian	Satomi Kurahashi			
2016	Love Live! Sunshine!!	Shima Takami			
2016	Aquarion Logos	Nesta			
2016	Yuri!!! on Ice	Minako Okukawa			
2016	Drifters	Jeanne d'Arc			
2016	Joker Game	Cynthia Glenn		Ep. 7	
2017	Dragon Ball Super	Agent Mai, Future Mai, Goku (young)			
2017	Garo: Crimson Moon	Princess Katsurako		Ep. 7	
2017	Chain Chronicle: The Light of Haecceitas	Aludra			
2017	ACCA: 13-Territory Inspection Dept.	Grise		Ep. 7	
2017	Sakura Quest	Angelica			
2017	Alice & Zōroku	Miriam C. Tachibana			
2017	Gosick	Harminia		Eps. 7–8	
2017	Love Tyrant	Suo Hiyama			
2017	Hina Logi ~from Luck & Logic~	Kozue Amahara			
2017	Glitter Force Doki Doki	Glitter Empress			
2017	Chronos Ruler	Victo Putin (Young)			
2017	Juni Taisen: Zodiac War	Kanae Aira / Tiger			
2017–21	Black Clover	Charlotte Roselei			
2017	The Ancient Magus' Bride	Titania			
2018	Ace Attorney	Mia Fey			
2018	Hakyu Hoshin Engi	Kashi			
2018	Hanebado!	Uchika Hanesaki			
2018	Overlord	Gagaran		season 2-3	
2018	RErideD	Donna			
2019–21	Fruits Basket	Akito Soma		2019 reboot	
2019	Fairy Gone	Nein Auraa			
2019	Fire Force	Princess Hibana			
2021	Edens Zero	Elsie Crimson, Mother		First Netflix dub role	
2021	SK8 the Infinity	Nanako Hasegawa			
2022	Heroines Run the Show	Tamura			
2023	Tomo-chan Is a Girl!	Misaki Gundou			
2024	The Wrong Way to Use Healing Magic	Rose			
2024	Fairy Tail: 100 Years Quest	Erza Scarlet			
2024	Delico's Nursery	Frieda Delico			
2024	Shangri-La Frontier	Rust			
2025	Zenshu	Townswoman			
2025	Solo Leveling	Park Kyung-hye		Season 2	
2025	The Beginning After the End	Alice			
2025	Tojima Wants to Be a Kamen Rider	Yuriko			
2026	Takopi's Original Sin	Azuma's Mom			
2026	A Misanthrope Teaches a Class for Demi-Humans	Rei's Mother			
2026	Daemons of the Shadow Realm	Left			
2026	Witch Hat Atelier	Adina Arklaum			

=== Animation ===
List of voice performances and production work in animation
Year	Series	Voice role	Notes	Source
2002–03	Mission Odyssey	Penelope, Medusa, and Aglaope		
2018–21	RWBY	Jinn	Vol. 6 + Vol. 8	
2019	Mao Mao: Heroes of Pure Heart	Mao Mao (kid)		

=== Films ===
List of voice performances and production work in direct-to-video and television films
Year	Series	Voice role	Crew role, Notes	Source
2004	Dragon Ball Z: Bojack Unbound	Zangya, Monty Cash		CA
2006	Fullmetal Alchemist the Movie: Conqueror of Shamballa	Riza Hawkeye, Rosé Thomas	Line producer	
2007	Shakugan no Shana The Movie		Line producer	
2007	Origin: Spirits of the Past	Jessica		CA
2008	One Piece Movie: The Desert Princess and the Pirates: Adventures in Alabasta	Monkey D. Luffy		
2009–14	Rebuild of Evangelion series	Ritsuko Akagi		
2010	Dragon Ball: Curse of the Blood Rubies	Goku		
2011	Summer Wars	Noriko Jinnouchi		
2011	Hetalia: Paint It, White!	Chibi Romano		
2012	Fafner in the Azure: Heaven and Earth	Kiyomi Kaname		
2012	Fullmetal Alchemist: The Sacred Star of Milos	Riza Hawkeye		
2012	Mass Effect: Paragon Lost		Casting director	
2012	Dragon Age: Dawn of the Seeker	Cassandra Pentaghast	Main role	
2013	Blood-C: The Last Dark	Haruno Yanagi		
2013	One Piece Film: Strong World	Monkey D. Luffy		
2013	Wolf Children	Hana		
2013	Fairy Tail the Movie: Phoenix Priestess	Erza Scarlet	Line producer	
2014	One Piece: Film Z	Monkey D. Luffy		

List of voice performances and production work in feature films
Year	Series	Voice role	Notes	Source
2014	Dragon Ball Z: Battle of Gods	Mai	Limited theatrical release	
2015	Dragon Ball Z: Resurrection 'F'	Mai	Limited theatrical release	
2017	One Piece Film: Gold	Monkey D. Luffy	Limited theatrical release	
2017	Fairy Tail: Dragon Cry	Erza Scarlet	Limited theatrical release	
2018	My Hero Academia: Two Heroes	Momo Yaoyorozu	Limited theatrical release	
2019	Dragon Ball Super: Broly	Goku (Young), Mai	Limited theatrical release	
2019	One Piece: Stampede	Monkey D. Luffy	Limited theatrical release	
2020	My Hero Academia: Heroes Rising	Momo Yaoyorozu	Limited theatrical release	
2022	One Piece Film: Red	Monkey D. Luffy	Limited theatrical release	
2022	Fruits Basket: Prelude	Akito Sohma	Limited theatrical release	
2025	The Colors Within	Rui's Mother	Limited theatrical release	

=== Live-action ===
List of voice performances and production work live-action
Year	Title	Role	Crew role, Notes	Source
2023	Ultraman Z	Junko Natsukawa	English Dub	

=== Video games ===
List of voice performances in video games
Year	Title	Role	Notes	Source
2004	BloodRayne 2	Minions		
2005	Spikeout: Battle Street	Linda		
2005	Æon Flux	Sybil, Hostesses		
2006	Dragon Ball Z: Shin Budokai	Android 18		
2006	Dragon Ball Z: Budokai Tenkaichi 2	Agent Mai, Zangya		
2007	Dragon Ball Z: Budokai Tenkaichi 3	Agent Mai, Zangya		
2008	One Piece: Unlimited Adventure	Monkey D. Luffy		
2008	Dragon Ball: Origins	Agent Mai		
2009	Case Closed: The Mirapolis Investigation	Rachel Moore		
2009	Ghostbusters: The Video Game	Possessor Ghost		
2009	Borderlands	Lilith, Patricia Tannis		
2009	Dragon Ball: Revenge of King Piccolo	Agent Mai		
2010	Dragon Ball Z: Tenkaichi Tag Team	Kid Gohan, Android 18		
2010	Dragon Ball: Raging Blast 2	Kid Gohan, Android 18, Zangya		
2011	Orcs Must Die!	Sorceress		
2011	Dragon Ball Z: Ultimate Tenkaichi	Kid Gohan, Android 18, Goku (baby)		
2012	Orcs Must Die! 2	Sorceress		
2012	Borderlands 2	Lilith, Patricia Tannis, Captain Scarlett		
2012	Dragon Ball Z: For Kinect	Kid Gohan		
2013	The Walking Dead: Survival Instinct	Scout, Kennedy, Walker		
2014	Dragon Ball Z: Battle of Z	Android 18, Kid Gohan		
2014	Smite	Arachne, Ne Zha, Narrator Tutorial		
2014	Borderlands: The Pre-Sequel!	Lilith, Patricia Tannis		
2015	Dragon Ball: Xenoverse	Kid Gohan, Goku (GT)		
2016	Battleborn	Nova, Galilea		
2016	Dragon Ball Xenoverse 2	Kid Gohan, Goku (GT)		
2017	Orcs Must Die! Unchained	Gabriella		
2018	Dragon Ball FighterZ	Kid Gohan, Goku (GT)		
2018	Dragon Ball Legends	Gohan (young), Goku (young), Future Mai, Zangya		
2019	Borderlands 3	Lilith, Patricia Tannis		
2020	Dragon Ball Z: Kakarot	Gohan (young), Agent Mai		
2020	My Hero's One Justice 2	Momo Yaoyorozu	Patch Update Inclusion	
2021	Tales of Luminaria	Lisette Regnier		
2022	Potionomics	Saffron	Patch update inclusion	
2025	Date Everything!	Lady Memoria		
2025	Borderlands 4	Lilith		
