= Hero Academy =

2012 video game

- Developer: Robot Entertainment
- Publisher: Robot Entertainment
- Platforms: Apple iOS, OS X, Microsoft Windows, Android
- Release: iOS: NA: January 11, 2012; Windows: NA: August 10, 2012; OS X: NA: December 11, 2012; Android: NA: October 10, 2013
- Genre: Turn-based tactics
- Mode: Multiplayer

Hero Academy was a two-player turn-based tactics video game created by the developer Robot Entertainment, known for their previous series Orcs Must Die!. The game was first released for the iPhone iOS platform on January 11, 2012, with ports later being released for the Microsoft Windows, OS X and Android platforms. In the game, players could take turns moving units on a board and attack enemy units with the objective of being the first to destroy the other player's crystal or eliminate all of the other player's units. The game received generally favorable reviews from critics. The game also featured cross platform play across all installed platforms. A sequel to the game was launched in January 2018. Hero Academy and its sequel ceased operations on April 8, 2019 as one had been long defunct and its sequel had been operating at a financial loss for several months.

== Gameplay ==
The game is turn-based and focuses on strategy, which required players to carefully plan out each step of their turn. Each player had one or many crystals and the objective was to be the first player to either eliminate all of the other player's units or destroy the other player's crystal(s). Each turn granted players five moves in the game. Units were played from a hand which was replenished at the end of each round with random new units. In addition to units, a player's hand could also contain spells and healing potions as well as weapons and armor which could be equipped to units.

=== Factions ===
The game contained six factions known as Heroic Teams:

- Council was a team made up of human units, and was the default team of the game.
- Dark Elves was an expansion team made up of mystical elvish creatures who were known for dark magic.
- Dwarves was an expansion team that consists of dwarf characters known for explosive attacks and bonuses to specialty squares.
- The Tribe is an expansion team made up of orc-like units, known for aggression.
- Team Fortress 2 is a team that was available exclusively to Steam users, but could be played on all platforms; the team is known for its adaptability and gameplay referencing the Team Fortress 2 title.
- Shaolin is an expansion team that was at one time exclusive to the Chinese version of the game; the human team is known for its conversion powers and combination attacks.

== Development ==
Robot Entertainment announced Hero Academy for the iOS platform in November 2011. The company was founded by Tony Goodman and its first employees were predominantly taken from the recently bankrupt Ensemble Studios, a studio that had previously worked on strategy games including the Age of Empires series and Halo Wars. The company's first mobile game, Hero Academy, was released on January 11, 2012, with an adware version offered for free or an ad-free version available for purchase. At the time of the release, additional downloadable content was made available for purchase including extra avatars, heroic teams, and visual and animation style changes. The purchasable content was primarily visual cosmetic changes and it did not offer better units or items to give a player an advantage. In addition to the cosmetic offerings, the Dark Elves faction included a new set of skills which Ars Technica writer Andrew Webster called "different but not necessarily stronger" and likened to purchasing an expansion pack.

In a bid to bring western mobile games to China, the Chinese publisher Yodo1 partnered with the developers in June 2012. The untranslated English version of the game was already receiving more downloads from China than any other country except the United States. Beyond translating the game, the Chinese Yodo1 version also had a new race to play in the game, Shaolin monks, as well as other new characters exclusive to the localized version.

The game was ported to Microsoft Windows and released on August 10, 2012 via digital distribution service Steam, but the developers originally planned to release it on August 8. After missing their target, the company released a statement saying that some players were having issues with the game that needed to be resolved before it could be released, and they planned to make the game available for the platform on August 16 at the latest. The developers beat their deadline, releasing the game onto Steam on August 10. A port of the game to the OS X platform was released via Steam on December 11 of the same year. An Android port was released on Google Play on October 10, 2013.

== Reception ==
The game received predominantly positive reviews upon release, garnering a 77% rating on the review aggregation website Metacritic. Ars Technica reviewer Andrew Webster wrote that the gameplay was simple compared to other strategy games which made it easy to learn the rules, and that offered enough depth to make each quick round satisfying. Webster also noted that the game was best played with friends rather than anonymous players since this would ensure turns would finish without delay.

During the 16th Annual D.I.C.E. Awards, the Academy of Interactive Arts & Sciences awarded Hero Academy with "Mobile Game of the Year".

== Sequel ==
Hero Academy 2 was soft launched in Canada on October 23, 2017. The official launch was January 16, 2018.

The sequel was nominated for "Best Multiplayer/Competitive Game" at the 2018 Webby Awards.
