= Robert McCollum =

American voice actor

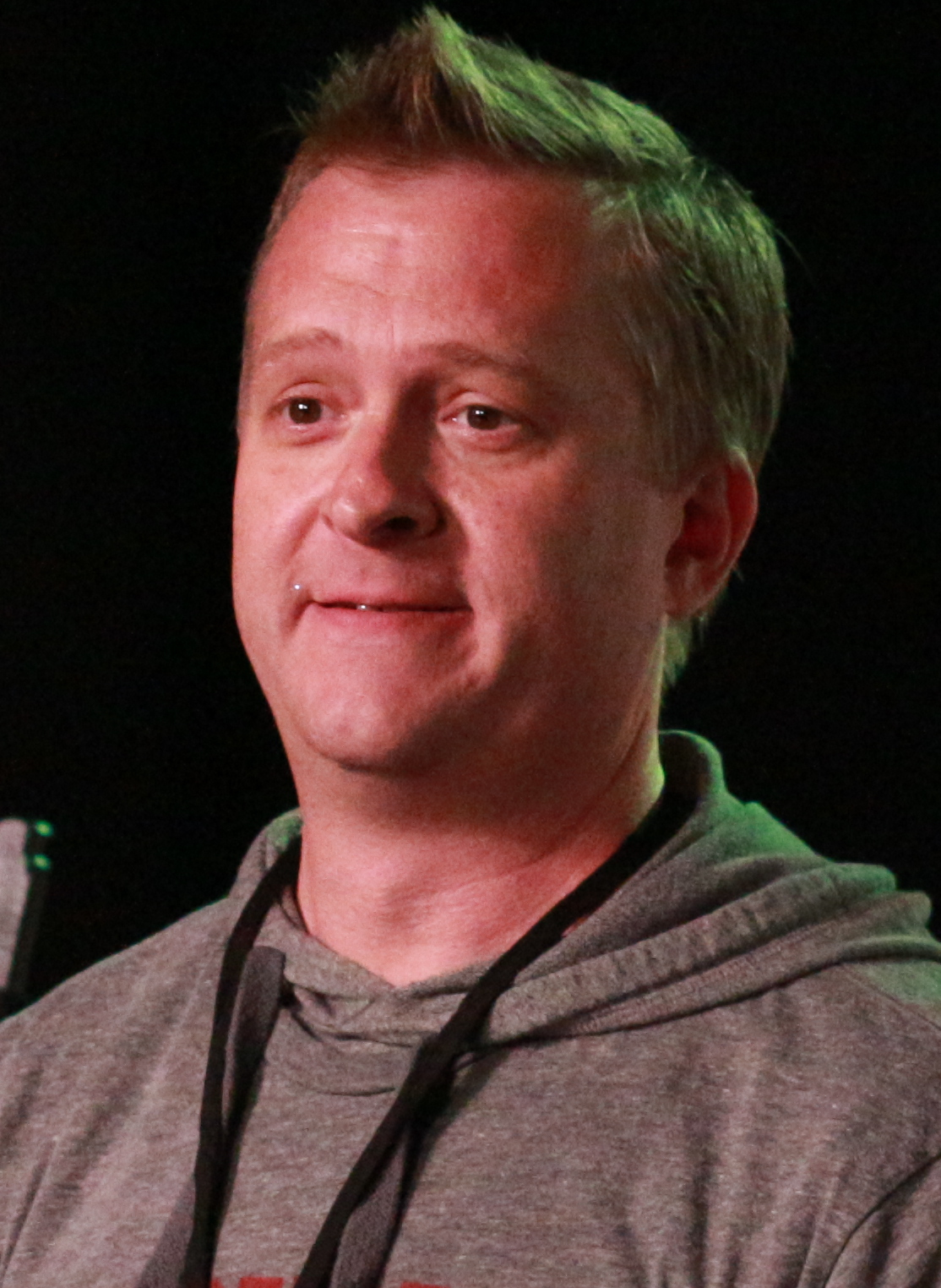
- McCollum at the 2015 Magic City Comic Con
- Born: Robert Howard McCollum
- Education: Trinity University, San Antonio, Texas
- Occupations: Voice actor; television host; producer
- Years active: 2002–present
- Spouse: Kristin McCollum (div.)
- Children: 2

Robert Howard McCollum is an American voice actor, television host, and producer who provides voices for a number of English-language versions of Japanese anime. Outside of voice acting, he was a host of WFAA-TV's Good Morning Texas in 2009, and has worked as a producer and contributor there. Some of his major roles include Shinya Kogami in Psycho-Pass, Baki in Baki the Grappler, Teen & Adult Goten in Dragon Ball Z and GT, Stiyl Magnus in A Certain Magical Index, Sensui in Yu Yu Hakusho, Jellal Fernandes in Fairy Tail, Reiner Braun in Attack on Titan, Yusuke Tozawa in Witchblade, Kazuma Yagami in Kaze no Stigma, Donquixote Doflamingo in One Piece, Stain in My Hero Academia, Julius Novachrono in Black Clover, and Justice in Edens Zero. Robert McCollum is the voice actor for B.F. Skinner's Walden Two audiobook on Audible.

== Filmography ==
=== Video games ===
List of voice performances in video games
| Year | Title | Role | Notes | Source |
|---|---|---|---|---|
| 2005 | Brothers in Arms: Earned in Blood | Cpl./Sgt. Seamus Doyle | | |
| 2011 | Orcs Must Die! | Hero | | |
| 2012 | Orcs Must Die! 2 | War Mage | | |
| 2012 | Borderlands 2 | Axton | | |
| 2016 | Killing Floor 2 | DJ Scully | | |
| 2020 | Borderlands 3 | Axton | | |

== Dubbing roles ==
=== Anime ===
List of English dubbing performances in anime
| Year | Title | Role | Notes | Source |
|---|---|---|---|---|
| | A Certain Magical Index series | Stiyl Magnus | | |
| | All Out!! | Shōta Adachigahara | | |
| 2016 | And You Thought There Is Never a Girl Online? | GMO1 Nyack | Ep. 8 | |
| 2020 | Appare-Ranman! | Dylan G. Oldin | | |
| | Assassination Classroom | Red Eye | | |
| 2014–2023 | Attack on Titan | Reiner Braun | also Attack on Titan: Junior High | |
| | Baki the Grappler series | Baki Hanma | | |
| 2016 | Barakamon | Seishū Handa | also Handa-kun | |
| | Birdy the Mighty: Decode | Keisuke Muroto | | Press |
| 2017-Present | Black Clover | Julius Nova Chrono | | |
| 2013 | Blood-C | Fumito Nanahara | | |
| 2016 | Cheer Boys!! | Professor Chin | Ep. 2 | |
| 2018 | Chio's School Road | Gotō | | |
| | Chrome Shelled Regios | Savalis Qualafin Luckens | | |
| 2017 | Chronos Ruler | Zed | Ep. 2 | |
| | Code:Breaker | Hiroki Takata | | |
| 2017 | Code Geass: Akito the Exiled | Stefan Malcal, Dore | | |
| | D.Gray-man | Suman Dark | | Press |
| 2015 | Death Parade | Ginti | | |
| | Dimension W | Shirō Kamiki | Eps. 4-5 | |
| 2003 | Dragon Ball GT | Goten (Adult) | | Press |
| 2018 | Dragon Ball Super | Barry Kahn | | |
| 2003 | Dragon Ball Z | Goten (Teenager), Boon | | |
| 2017 | Dragon Ball Z Kai | Jewel, Goten (Teenager) | | |
| | Dragonar Academy | Klaus Witershausen | | |
| 2016 | Drifters | Oda Nobunaga | | |
| | Eureka Seven: AO | Endo | Ep. 13 | |
| 2011-2019 | Fairy Tail | Jellal Fernandes, Mystogan | | |
| | Free! Eternal Summer | Seijuro Mikoshiba | | |
| 2021 | Full Dive | Granada | | |
| | Fullmetal Alchemist: Brotherhood | Scar's Brother | | |
| | Future Diary | Keigo Kurusu (4th) | | |
| | Ga-Rei: Zero | Toru Kanze | | Press |
| 2015 | Gangsta | Dr. Theo | | |
| 2017 | Garo: Crimson Moon | Watanabe no Tsuna | Ep. 8 | |
| 2017 | Gosick | Brian Roscoe | | |
| | Hell Girl | Masaya Kataoka | Ep. 11 | |
| | Hetalia: Axis Powers | Sweden | | |
| | High School DxD Hero | Hades | Ep. 10 | |
| | Initial D | Wataru Akiyama | Second Stage and Fourth Stage, Funimation dub | Press |
| | Jormungand series | Scarecrow | | |
| | Kamisama Kiss | Dragon King | | |
| | Kaze no Stigma | Kazuma Yagami | | |
| 2019 | Kono Oto Tomare! Sounds of Life | Tetsuki Takaoka | | |
| | Laughing Under the Clouds | Shirasu Kinjo | | |
| | Level E | Itakura | Ep. 4 | |
| | Maken-ki! series | Gen Tagayashi | | |
| 2019 | Million Arthur | Chapman | Ep. 14 | |
| 2016 | Monster Hunter Stories: Ride On | Reverto | | |
| 2017 | My Hero Academia | Chizome Akaguro/Stain | | |
| | Nabari no Ou | Kazuhiko Yukimi | | |
| 2015 | Ninja Slayer From Animation | Shigaki | Ep. 5 | |
| | One Piece | Donquixote Doflamingo, Ed, Chaka, Calgara, Additional Voices | | |
| | Peach Girl | Kazuya "Toji" Tojigamori | | Press |
| 2018 | Pop Team Epic | Pipimi | Ep. 8b | |
| | Psycho-Pass series | Shinya Kogami | | |
| 2016 | Rampo Kitan: Game of Laplace | Namikoshi's Father | Ep. 10 | |
| 2013 | Red Data Girl | Daisei Suzuhara | | Press |
| | Riddle Story of Devil | Kaiba | | |
| | Rideback | Kiefer | | |
| 2010 | Rin: Daughters of Mnemosyne | Koki Maeno | | |
| | Robotics;Notes | Mitsuhiko "Mitchi" Nagafukada | | |
| | Romeo × Juliet | Curio | | |
| | Rosario + Vampire series | Saizo Komiya | | |
| 2017 | Sakura Quest | Takamizawa | | |
| | Samurai 7 | Tessai | | |
| 2017 | Samurai Warriors | Chōsokabe Motochika | Eps. 8, 12 | |
| 2018 | SSSS.Gridman | Gridman | | |
| | Sands of Destruction | Toppy Topuran | | |
| 2012 | Sekirei series | Mutsu | credited as Robert Howard | |
| | Sengoku Basara: Samurai Kings series | Date Masamune | also Sengoku Basara: End of Judgement | |
| 2016 | Snow White with the Red Hair | Sakaki | | |
| | Soul Eater | Mifune | | |
| | Speed Grapher | Ginji Nihari | | Press |
| | Strain: Strategic Armored Infantry | Ralph Werec | | Press |
| | Suzuka | Yasunobu Hattori | | |
| | Terror in Resonance | Kenjirō Shibazaki | | |
| 2017 | The Ancient Magus' Bride | Jasper | Eps. 1, 4 | |
| | The Legend of the Legendary Heroes | Tiir Rumibul | | |
| | The Rolling Girls | Kishō Ōtomo | Eps. 9-11 | |
| | The Tower of Druaga: The Sword of Uruk | Uragon | | Press |
| 2016 | Tōken Ranbu: Hanamaru | Izuminokami Kanesada | | |
| | Tokyo Ghoul series | Arata Kirishima | | |
| 2013 | Toriko | Johannes | | |
| | Witchblade | Yusuke Tozawa | | |
| | World Break: Aria of Curse for a Holy Swordsman | Tadanori Urushibara | | |
| 2018 | Yamada-kun and the Seven Witches | Ren Asano | Ep. 8 | |
| | Yona of the Dawn | Han Joo-Doh | | |
| | YuYu Hakusho | Shinobu Sensui | | Press |
| 2020 | Fire Force | Purt Co Pan | | |
| 2020 | Fruits Basket 2nd Season | Isuzu's Father | (Ep. 18) | |
| 2021 | Moriarty the Patriot | Earl Moriarty | | |
| 2021 | Edens Zero | Justice | Netflix dub | |
| 2024 | Demon Lord 2099 | Marcus | | |
| 2025 | Yakuza Fiancé: Raise wa Tanin ga Ii | Hotei | | |
| 2025 | Detective Conan | Kogoro Mori | | |

==== Films ====
List of English dubbing performances in animated films
| Year | Title | Role | Notes | Source |
|---|---|---|---|---|
| 2012 | Blood-C: The Last Dark | Fumito Nanahara | | |
| 2005 | Dragon Ball Z: Bio-Broly | Maloja | | |
| 2004 | Dragon Ball Z: Bojack Unbound | Bido | | |
| 2005 | Dragon Ball Z: Broly - Second Coming | Maloja | | |
| 2006 | Dragon Ball Z: The Tree of Might | Rasin, Lakasei | | |
| 2006 | Dragon Ball Z: The World's Strongest | Misokatsun | | |
| 2006 | Dragon Ball Z: Wrath of the Dragon | Hirudegarn | | |
| 2015 | Ghost in the Shell: The New Movie | Sawada | | |
| | Psycho-Pass: The Movie | Shinya Kogami | | |
| 2012 | Sengoku Basara: The Last Party | Date Masamune | | |
| | Summer Wars | Yorihiko Jinnouchi | | |
| 2022 | Dragon Ball Super: Super Hero | Goten, Fat Gotenks | | |
| 2023 | Psycho-Pass Providence | Shinya Kogami | | |

=== Live-action films ===
List of English dubbing performances in live action films
| Year | Title | Role | Notes | Source |
|---|---|---|---|---|
| 2017 | Black Butler | Ichizo Tokisawa | | |
| 2016 | Rurouni Kenshin trilogy | Hajime Saito | | |

=== Video games ===
List of English dubbing performances in video games
| Year | Title | Role | Notes | Source |
|---|---|---|---|---|
| 2006 | Dragon Ball Z: Budokai Tenkaichi 2 | Hirudegarn | | |
| 2007 | Dragon Ball Z: Budokai Tenkaichi 3 | Hirudegarn | | |
| 2012 | Borderlands 2 | Axton | | [91] |
| 2021 | Dragon Ball Legends | Bido | | |
