= J. T. Petty =

American filmmaker and writer (born 1977)

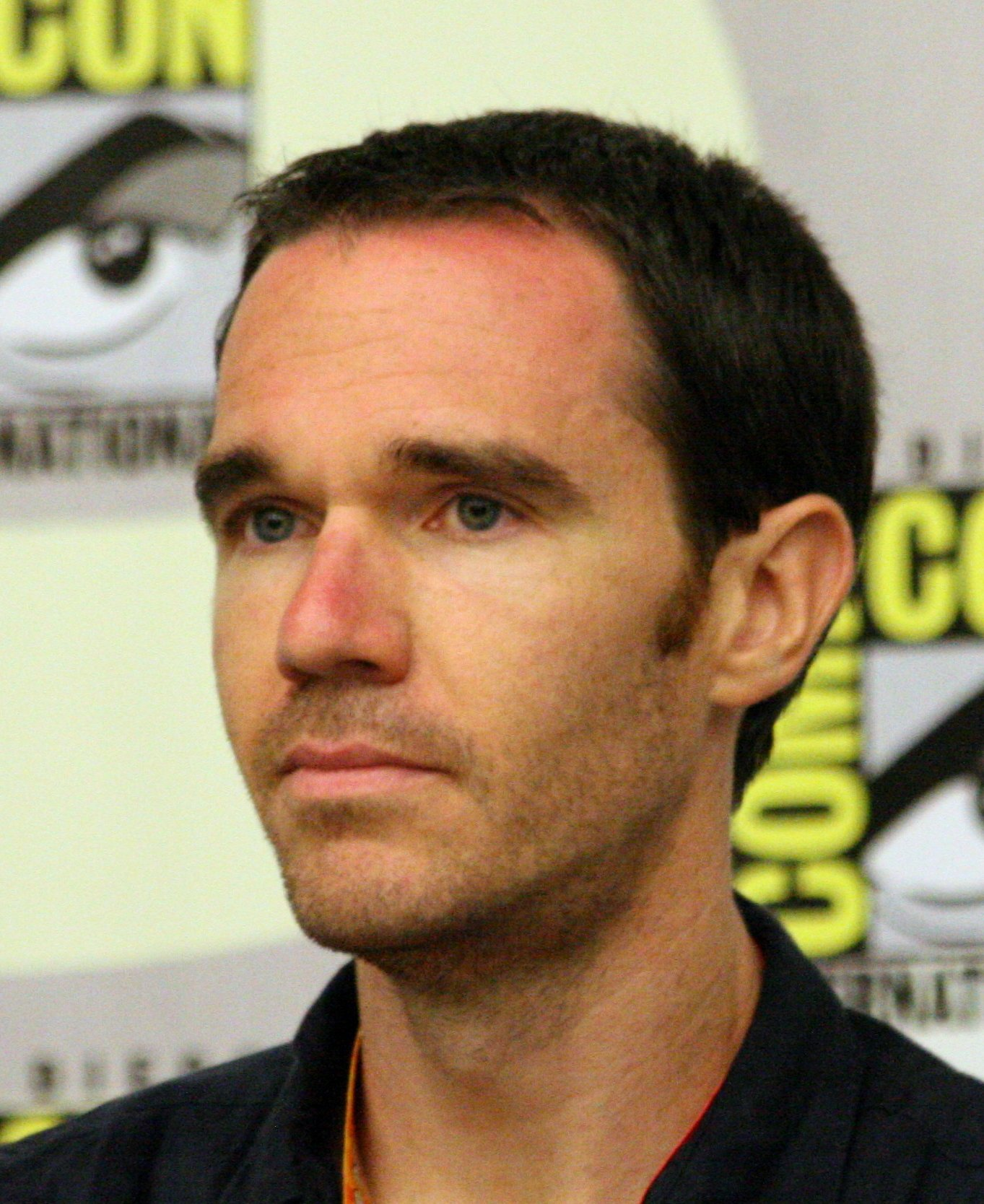
- Petty at San Diego Comic-Con in 2012
- Born: February 28, 1977 (age 49); Raleigh, North Carolina, U.S.
- Occupations: Film director; author; video game writer
- Years active: 2001–present
- Spouse: Sarah Langan

J. T. Petty (born February 28, 1977) is an American filmmaker and video game writer. His film and short novels contain elements of the horror genre. As writer for the Ubisoft video games Tom Clancy's Splinter Cell and its sequel Tom Clancy's Splinter Cell: Pandora Tomorrow, Petty created the character Sam Fisher. He also wrote the survival horror games Outlast, Outlast 2 and The Outlast Trials.

== Filmography ==
Film

Year	Title	Director	Writer	Producer	Notes
2001	Soft for Digging	Yes	Yes	Yes	Also editor
2003	Mimic 3: Sentinel	Yes	Yes	No	Direct-to-video
2006	S&Man	Yes	Yes	Yes	
2008	The Burrowers	Yes	Yes	No	
2009	Blood Red Earth	Yes	Yes	Yes	Short film
2012	Hellbenders	Yes	Yes	No	
2016	Gone	Yes	No	Consulting	

Other credits

Year	Title	Role
1999	Final Rinse	Production coordinator
1999	Wirey Spindell	Office production assistant
2000	Hamlet	Additional production assistant
2007	Murder Party	Special thanks
2009	The House of the Devil	Special thanks
2013	I Used to Be Darker	Special thanks
2021	Malignant	Uncredited script work

Television

Year	Title	Director	Writer	Executive Producer	Notes
2011	Stake Land: Origins	Yes	No	No	Episode "Sister"
2015	Death Battle	No	No	No	Episode "Solid Snake VS Sam Fisher" Credited as Creator of Sam Fisher.
2015	Brooklyn Animal Control	No	Yes	Yes	
2024	Secret Level	No	Yes	Yes	Wrote 4 episodes

== Bibliography ==
Novels

- 2005: Clemency Pogue: Fairy Killer, Simon & Schuster, ISBN 0-689-87236-4
- 2006: Clemency Pogue: The Hobgoblin Proxy, Simon & Schuster, ISBN 0-689-87236-4
- 2006: The Squampkin Patch, Simon & Schuster, ISBN 1-4169-0274-0
- 2007: The Scrivener Bees, Simon & Schuster, ISBN 1-4169-0769-6
- 2012: Bloody Chester, First Second, ISBN 978-1-59643-100-3
- 2014: The Rise of Aurora West, (with Paul Pope) First Second, ISBN 978-1-62672-009-1
- 2015: The Fall of the House of West, (with Paul Pope) First Second, ISBN 978-1-62672-010-7

Comic books

- 2013: Brooklyn Animal Control, IDW Publishing
- 2016: Outlast: The Murkoff Account
- 2023: The Murkoff Collections

== Video games ==
Year	Title	Developer
2001	Batman: Vengeance	Ubi Soft Montreal
2002	Tom Clancy's Splinter Cell	Ubi Soft Montreal
2004	Tom Clancy's Splinter Cell: Pandora Tomorrow	Ubisoft Milan; Ubisoft Shanghai
2005	Batman Begins	Eurocom
2011	Homefront	Kaos Studios
2013	Outlast	Red Barrels
2014	Outlast: Whistleblower	Red Barrels
2014	The Walking Dead: Season Two	Telltale Games
2015	Minecraft: Story Mode	Telltale Games
2017	Outlast 2	Red Barrels
2023	The Outlast Trials	Red Barrels
