= Orcs Must Die! Unchained =

2017 video game

- Developer: Robot Entertainment
- Publisher: Robot Entertainment
- Engine: Unreal Engine 3
- Platforms: Microsoft Windows; PlayStation 4
- Release: Microsoft Windows: WW: April 19, 2017; PlayStation 4: WW: July 18, 2017
- Genres: Tower defense, action
- Modes: Single-player, multiplayer

Orcs Must Die! Unchained was a third installment in the Orcs Must Die! franchise from Robot Entertainment, available for Microsoft Windows and PlayStation 4. Unchained was initially released as a beta version in 2014, and later in its release form in 2017 for the Windows platform on April 19, and for PlayStation 4 on July 18.

As with the previous titles, Unchained is a variation on tower defense games, where the player could place traps within the game's levels and engage in direct combat with a selected hero characters to ward off several waves of orcs and other monsters from reaching a magic core. While the game was available to purchase during its beta period, Unchained was released as a free-to-play title with a meta-game for players who earned in-game currency and upgrades through successful matches to improve traps and acquire other items and attributes to support their character, or who could purchase them directly using real world money. The game included co-operative matches for up to three players against AI opponents, and a competitive mode between two teams of three, competing on separate instances of the map but with the ability to affect the other team's performance; the game previously featured a competitive, 5v5 player-versus-player mode named Siege that was dropped during the beta phase.

Robot Entertainment shut down the game's servers in April 2019, after running the game at a financial loss for several months, making the game no longer playable without third-party modifications.

== Gameplay ==
Unchained followed the general hybrid gameplay of tower defense and action games used in the series' previous titles. Players could use a combination of direct attacks and numerous traps to prevent hordes of monsters from reaching a core. In open beta, the game was divided between its cooperative Survival mode, and its competitive Siege mode. Since its December 2016 update, the Siege mode has been dropped from the game entirely. Upon its full release, Orcs Must Die! Unchained included a new head-to-head mode called Sabotage.

=== Survival mode ===
In the game's Survival mode, players worked cooperatively to fend off several waves of orcs and other monsters from reaching a magic core; those who reached it reduced the core's health by one point, and if the core lost all its points (typically starting with 25), the match was over as a loss to the players.

To stop the monsters, players could use various traps and other items that they placed in the corridors leading from the entrance point to the core that damaged the monsters, as well as traps that were pre-built in the level, such as a trap that, when triggered, sent a large boulder downstairs. Furthermore, players had different combat abilities when directly confronting monsters, which depended on which hero they chose: a basic attack and three special attacks or moves that consumed mana and required a cool-down period before they could be used again. Players took damage from monster's attacks, and if their health was depleted, the player's character was instantly knocked out of combat and respawned near the core.

Before a match, the player could construct a "deck" of traps and other items that could be placed, as well as Guardians, computer-controlled allies that defended marked points on a map, single-use items that could restore health or mana or provide buffs for the player or team, and traits that granted attribute boosts in specific situations, such as dealing more damage to monsters of specific types. Decks could only contain a limited number of these items. When a match began, each player selected one of the game's heroes, either from a rotating roster of free heroes available or from heroes they had created or purchased; each player selected a different hero. They could then select one of their pre-made decks to complement that hero's abilities.

The game was divided into waves of monsters, with the goal of surviving a fixed number of waves. As the waves progressed, the difficulty increased, usually with more monsters appearing, more powerful monsters among them, or monsters appearing from additional points in the level and forcing players to split up to deal with the horde. Additionally, some waves randomly generated a mini-boss monster or a computer-controlled hero that attacked the players. Most waves automatically moved on to the next wave after a few seconds following completion, but some waves gave players a chance to set up traps, heal, and other activities and only progressed after all players were ready or after a certain amount of time.

Setting traps required earning in-game currency during a match. Players automatically started with some money and gained some money over time, but most of the money came from killing monsters through attacks and their traps. Traps could also be sold at a reduced cost. Players could place as many of the traps they had equipped in their deck as they could afford. Alternatively, players could freely place Guardians on the map, but Guardians could only be used once and if they fell in battle, they could not be used again.

As the player earned money and points for killing monsters, they gained experience levels within the match, starting from Level 1 to Level 12. The level gained increased the health and mana capacity and base attack values for the player's hero, and every three levels, the player could choose one of three useful traits to give to their hero for the duration of that match. Further, as the player's score grew, they filled an "Unchained" meter. Once this meter was full, the player could activate it at any time to briefly enter a powered-up state in which their attacks dealt greater damage and restored their mana and skill cooldowns at a much faster rate, making them more effective in battle.

During the match, monsters dropped loot that was used to craft new traps and other items in the metagame. Successfully surviving all of these waves, players received additional rewards, including Skulls, the in-game currency used for purchases and crafting. The selected hero gained experience towards their overall hero level, with each level achieved earning additional rewards for the player and increasing their overall player level.

=== Siege mode ===
Siege mode was based on a typical multiplayer online battle arena, played by two teams of up to five players, with each player on the team having a unique hero. In addition to guardians, traps, and other cards that players selected for their deck as in survival mode, players could also add up to eight minion cards, representing four different levels of hordes of creatures that were summoned during the game. Siege maps were symmetrical, with each side having a single magic core location, one or more summoning portals, control points for summoning boss monsters against the opposing team, as well as hallways and locations they controlled to place guardians and traps. This mode was removed in the game's December 2016 patch.

=== Sabotage mode ===
In its first non-beta release, Unchained introduced Sabotage mode. Here, players could compete as two teams of three, each team playing on their own instance of the same map with the same waves of orcs and other creatures against both teams. Special consumables were earned in this mode that allowed players on each team to cause some type of disruption to the other team, such as summoning a stronger creature or boss or casting a spell that would disrupt their traps. The team that survived the most waves won the match.

=== Metagame ===
Players could earn their traps, gear, and skulls (the in-game soft currency) from loot-filled chests after winning matches. Traps could be further upgraded using an upgrade system to increase their power. Players could also spend real money through microtransactions to pay for these items and upgrades. Outside of matches, players could construct the various decks for Survival and Sabotage modes. Some items were equipped in one of these modes, so decks were tailored to a specific type of play.

== Plot ==
Despite being the third installment in the Orcs Must Die! franchise, the game is considered non-canon in the storyline of the following game, Orcs Must Die! 3.

== Reception ==
Reception

Aggregate score
Aggregator	Score
Metacritic	(PC) 87/100 (PS4) 82/100

Orcs Must Die! Unchained received "generally positive" reviews, according to review aggregator website Metacritic.

Chandler Wood of PlayStation LifeStyle rated the PS4 port an 8 out of 10, praising its balanced free-to-play experience, mix of action and tower defense gameplay, and indirect versus mode, while criticizing menus unoptimized for console and subpar quick communications functions.

== Shutdown ==
Robot Entertainment shut down the game's servers on April 9, 2019. The company had been running Unchained at a financial loss for several months, and with two new games in the works decided to close down its servers. The game can still be played via an offline mod from a dedicated modding community. Players were given a hefty boost of in-game currency after the announcement as to be able to enjoy the title until its planned shutdown.
