= Outlive =

2000 video game

- Developer: Continuum Entertainment
- Publisher: BRA: Continuum Entertainment; Take-Two Interactive
- Platform: Windows
- Release: BRA: 2000; NA: March 20, 2001; PAL: March 30, 2001
- Genre: Real-time strategy
- Modes: Single-player, multiplayer

Outlive (Portuguese: Outlive: A Era da Sobrevivência) is a real-time strategy video game developed and produced by Brazilian studio Continuum Entertainment. It is a mission-based real-time strategy game where the player controls either the human military or robot forces and attempts to eliminate all opposing forces. It was initially released in 2000 in Brazil (2001 for the rest of the world), and was the second and most successful product of Continuum. The game was one of the few Brazilian games to be published by a mainstream AAA publisher back in the early 2000s. It was published in the United States and Europe by Take-Two Interactive.

== Story ==
=== Setting ===
The story of Outlive is set on 2035, with Earth facing dwindling mineral resources along with increased terrorist activity. To address both concerns, the most powerful nations on Earth and economic conglomerates band together and succeed the United Nations into a new World Council, whom launches the Outlive space program, dedicated to seeking and mining resources in planets and moons across the Solar System. After seven years of searching, the World Council deemed the moon of Titan to be the richest in resources, but also the most inhospitable to human life.

In a race of their own for ownership of Titan, two scientific groups emerged with proposing radical solutions - The first group, led by Dr. Joseph Taylor, proposed using genetically created beings for hard labor, while the second group, represented by Mechatronics Inc., proposed a full AI-driven robotic mission. Given the urgency of the Outlive program, each group was given a single year to present their developments while construction of the spaceships proceeded at full pace, often being met with sabotage, attacks by paramilitary terrorist groups such as the Liberty Army, and accusations exchanged between both science groups.

The situation escalates to a peak in 2045 after an assassination attempt on Dr. Taylor, on which the Liberty Army is framed for. Due to this, the World Council imposes a global martial law, with its Defense Councilor, General Robert J. Kaminski, assuming total command. To fight the Liberty Army and ensure Taylor's project is protected, Kaminski forms the SCTG (Special Counter-Terrorism Group), led by Lieutenant Brad Maxwell.

=== Plot ===
While battling the Liberty Army on multiple occasions, the SCTG escorts Dr. Taylor to his relocated laboratory to continue his work, but a sudden breakout of his genetically modified creatures forces the World Council to terminate Taylor's project and pass full ownership of the Outlive mission to Mechatronics. When the Liberty Army then storms Mechatronics and holds hostage the lead researcher, Dr. Mary-Anne Harley, Maxwell uses the prototype robots to help reclaim the facility, but grows suspicious of Mechatronics as well, given their visible development of illegal military-grade weaponry. Against direct orders issued by Kaminski himself, Maxwell and his subordinate, Lt. Peter Mackenzie, infiltrate a Mechatronics experimental testing site to gather hard evidence, which they present to Kaminski.

The Outlive mission is launched, but the Liberty Army shoots down one of the three spacecraft bound for Titan. While searching the wreckage, the SCTG turns on both Maxwell and Mackenzie, with Kaminski himself revealing to be partnered with Mechatronics and its CEO, Carl Eberhardt. The Liberty Army rescues both Maxwell and Mackenzie, the latter also being revealed to be a double-agent. The Liberty Army's leader, Pablo Morales, reveals he was fully aware of the collusion between both the World Council and Mechatronics, including the acts of sabotage against Taylor's program, hence his attacks on the Outlive program.

The Liberty Army discovers the World Council has built a series of ICBMs to be used against the Liberty Army's encampments across Earth. Mackenzie proceeds to disarm all silos, but the final one is revealed to be rigged to detonate if disarmed, and Mackenzie perishes in the blast. Vowing revenge, Maxwell leads a siege against Kaminski's primary position, overthrowing him in spite of the World Council's arsenal and the support of Mechatronics' robotic forces. With Kaminski having been arrested, the World Council is dissolved and Morales and Maxwell take over, forming the Confederation.

Eberhardt, now a fugitive, sends a distress call to Outlive-2 - thought to also have been lost - and its leading AI Argus, whom arrives to rescue Eberhardt, recapture the defecting Dr. Harley, and open a transport portal between Earth and Titan, allowing the leading AI of Outlive-3, Draco, to arrive and storm the Confederation. Kaminski sends a distress signal, exchanging information for safety, but the "rescue" is revealed to be a trap so the Confederation could capture Argus and reprogram it. While Kaminski is killed for his betrayal, Argus is nevertheless reprogrammed and almost leads Draco into a trap itself. In spite of this, however, Draco and Eberhardt push on and succeed in overthrowing the Confederation, capturing Maxwell and forcing Morales, Argus and Harley to be on the run.

Reforming themselves into a Resistance, Morales and Argus and their combined forces work together to fight off Mechatronics and rescue both Harley and Maxwell, culminating into a final battle that results in Draco being destroyed, the rest of Mechatronics' arsenal being wiped out and Eberhardt being forced to escape into deep space.

While Maxwell and Morales form a New Confederation and Harley sends Argus to take control of the Outlive mission on Titan, it is revealed that Eberhardt had been in the employ of an alien race clearly intending to invade Earth. The aliens themselves execute Eberhardt for his failure and then proceed to invade Earth, their giant UFOs in orbit and poised to attack.

== Reception ==
Reception

Aggregate score
Aggregator	Score
Metacritic	59/100

Review scores
Publication	Score
Computer Gaming World	3.5/5
GameSpot	5.2/10
GameSpy	65%
GameZone	7.5/10
PC Gamer (US)	47%
PC Zone	50%

The game received "mixed" reviews according to the review aggregation website Metacritic.
