= The Omega Stone: Riddle of the Sphinx II =

2003 video game

The Omega Stone
- Developer: Omni World Studios (Note: Ported to Mac OS X by TransGaming.)
- Publisher: DreamCatcher Interactive
- Directors: Jeffrey S. Tobler; Karen E. Tobler
- Programmers: Thomas Carton; Michael Creighton; Jeffrey S. Tobler
- Composer: Jeffrey S. Tobler
- Platforms: Windows, Mac OS X
- Release: March 18, 2003 (Win); March 9, 2004 (Mac)
- Genre: Adventure
- Mode: Single-player

The Omega Stone is a Microsoft Windows puzzle adventure game developed by American studio Omni World Studios. It was the sequel to the game Riddle of the Sphinx: An Egyptian Adventure and was released by DreamCatcher Interactive on March 18, 2003.

== Plot ==
In The Omega Stone, players embark on an adventure to solve an ancient mystery, visiting locations such as the Great Sphinx of Giza, Stonehenge, Easter Island and even the ruins of Atlantis in the process. You travel to these sites with the use of passes where you investigate the area for clues on the location of 5 "Omega Discs". The locations of these, in addition to those already mentioned, include beneath the Bermuda Triangle (although where is unknown), inside the manor of an English Lord, inside the pyramid of Chichen Itza and a within a Druidic Compound.

== Reception ==
Reception

Aggregate score
Aggregator	Score
Metacritic	72/100

Review scores
Publication	Score
Adventure Gamers	3/5
Computer Gaming World	3/5
GameSpot	8/10
GameSpy	2/5
Gamezebo	2.5/5
GameZone	7.1/10
PC Gamer (UK)	29%
PC Gamer (US)	59%

The game received "average" reviews according to the review aggregation website Metacritic. According to PC Data, The Omega Stone's sales in North America totaled 29,400 units by the end of 2003.
