= Opsys =

2000 video game

- Developer: Lemon Interactive
- Publisher: [hyper]media limited
- Platforms: Windows, Macintosh
- Release: 2000
- Genres: Educational, adventure
- Mode: Single-player

Opsys is an educational adventure video game by Polish studio Lemon Interactive and published by [hyper]media limited in 2000 on Macintosh and Windows.

== Plot and gameplay ==
When someone breaks into the Museum of the History of Cypriot Coinage and steals all the ancient coins, the player must travel through time and recover them, from 500 BC to 1960.

Players can travel to locations via a map, and can access a clue book to complete the puzzles.

Opsys is a 3D virtual reality game with Myst-like graphics and full-motion video.

== Production ==
Lemon Interactive, the game's Polish developer, announced a competition where by the first player to find all the coins would win 10,000 dollars, but the competition was never finalised. The competition was also extended to the English-speaking world. The demo version lacked some gameplay elements and only allowed players to walk through the wardrobe in their own apartment to the virtual reality lab, and access the temple VR, tomb VR and theatre VR.

== Reception ==
Gamepressure/Gry-Online praised the artwork of the landscapes that the player traverses through. Gamezone felt it was a "terrific cerebral challenge". Quandaryland felt that one of the only reasons someone would play this game is for the chance to win $10,000. Just Adventure described it as more than a contest than a game.
