= Outlast =

2013 video game

- Developer: Red Barrels
- Publisher: Red Barrels
- Writer: J. T. Petty
- Composer: Samuel Laflamme
- Engine: Unreal Engine 3
- Platforms: Microsoft Windows; PlayStation 4; Xbox One; Linux; OS X; Nintendo Switch
- Release: Microsoft Windows; WW: September 4, 2013 PlayStation 4; NA: February 6, 2014; PAL: February 5, 2014 Xbox One; WW: June 19, 2014 Linux, OS X; WW: March 31, 2015 Nintendo Switch; WW: February 27, 2018
- Genre: Survival horror
- Mode: Single-player

Outlast is a 2013 first-person psychological survival horror video game developed and published by the Canadian independent studio Red Barrels. The plot centres on Miles Upshur, a freelance investigative journalist who investigates Mount Massive Asylum, a remote psychiatric hospital located deep in the mountains of Lake County, Colorado, United States.

It was released for Microsoft Windows on September 4, 2013, PlayStation 4 on February 4, 2014, and Xbox One on June 19, 2014. Linux and OS X versions were released on March 31, 2015 while a Nintendo Switch version was released on February 27, 2018. Outlast received generally positive reviews from critics for its atmosphere, horror elements, and overall gameplay. As of October 2024, it has a playerbase of 37 million.

A sequel, Outlast 2, was released on April 25, 2017, while a prequel, The Outlast Trials, was released on March 5, 2024. The Murkoff Account, a comic book series set between Outlast and Outlast 2, was released from July 2016 to November 2017. A second comic series, The Murkoff Collections, was published in October 2024. A film adaptation is also in development.

== Gameplay ==
The player can see their surroundings and other enemies in the dark, using the night vision mode on their camcorder.

In Outlast, the player assumes the role of a freelance investigative journalist named Miles Upshur as he navigates in Mount Massive Asylum, a dilapidated psychiatric hospital in the mountains of Lake County, Colorado, United States, that is overrun by homicidal patients. It is played from a first-person perspective and features some stealth gameplay mechanics. The player can walk, run, crouch, jump, climb ladders and vault over objects. Unlike in many video games, the player does not have a visible health bar and is unable to attack enemies; they must instead rely on stealth tactics such as hiding in lockers, sneaking past enemies, staying in the shadows, and hiding behind or under things to survive. Alternatively, the player can attempt to outrun their pursuer. If the player dies, the game will reset to the most recent checkpoint.

Most of the hospital is unlit, and the only way for the player to see while in the dark is through the lens of a camcorder equipped with night vision. Using the night vision mode will slowly consume batteries, of which there are not many, forcing the player to scavenge for additional batteries found throughout the hospital. Outlast makes heavy use of traditional jump scares and audio cues, which alert the player if an enemy has seen them. If the player records specific events with their camcorder, Miles will write a note about it, providing further insight into his thoughts. Documents can be collected, which offer backstory and other expository information about the facility, including pages taken from patients' diaries and reports from the hospital's staff.

Its developer, Red Barrels, have pointed to the survival-focused gameplay in Amnesia: The Dark Descent (2010) as a primary influence on the combat-free narrative style of Outlast. Found footage horror films like Quarantine (2008) and Rec (2007) also served as influences.

== Plot ==
A freelance investigative journalist named Miles Upshur receives an anonymous email about inhumane experiments at Mount Massive Asylum, a remote psychiatric hospital owned by the notoriously unethical Murkoff Corporation. Upon entering, Miles is shocked to discover its halls ransacked and littered with the staff's mutilated corpses. He is informed by a dying officer of Murkoff's private military unit that the hospital's deranged inmates, known as "variants", have escaped and are freely roaming the grounds. The officer implores Miles to escape and reveals that the main entrance can be unlocked from the hospital's security control room.

As Miles moves on, he is suddenly ambushed by Chris Walker, a hulking variant who knocks him unconscious. While incapacitated, Miles meets Father Martin Archimbaud, a self-appointed priest with schizotypal personality disorder, who claims that Miles is his "apostle" and sabotages his escape by cutting off power to the entrance. Miles restores power in the control room, but Father Martin injects him with an anesthetic. He also shows Miles footage of the "Walrider", a ghost-like entity that kills patients and staff alike, which he claims is responsible for the hospital's dilapidated state.

Regaining consciousness, Miles finds himself trapped in a decaying cell block filled with catatonic and demented patients. He escapes through the sewers to the main wards, pursued by Walker and two cannibalistic twins, only to be captured by Richard Trager, a former Murkoff executive driven insane. Trager amputates two of Miles' fingers and prepares to do the same to his tongue and genitals. However, Miles escapes to an elevator, inadvertently crushing Trager to death between floors when he attacks him. Miles then reconvenes with Father Martin, who tells him to go to the hospital's chapel.

Miles reaches an auditorium and learns that the Walrider was created by Rudolf Wernicke, a German scientist brought to the United States during Operation Paperclip. Wernicke believed that intensive dream therapy conducted on traumatised patients could connect swarms of nanites into a single malevolent being. Miles also learns that the experiments were originally part of the MKUltra program. In the chapel, Miles finds a crucified Father Martin, who gives him a key to the lobby elevator that he insists will take him to freedom before immolating himself. Miles takes the elevator, which descends into a subterranean laboratory.

Walker arrives and attacks Miles, only to be eviscerated by the Walrider. Miles locates an aged Wernicke, who confirms that the Walrider is a biotechnological nanite entity controlled by Billy Hope, a comatose patient of Murkoff's experiments. Wernicke orders Miles to terminate Billy's life support in the hopes that this will destroy the Walrider. Miles accomplishes the task; however, just before Billy dies, the Walrider attacks Miles and possesses his body. On his way out of the laboratory, a heavily injured Miles encounters a Murkoff private military unit led by Wernicke, which guns him down.

While a horrified Wernicke realises that Miles has become the Walrider's new host, the screen fades black as panicked screams, gunfire, and mauling sounds are heard.

=== Outlast: Whistleblower ===
An expansion available as downloadable content, titled Outlast: Whistleblower, was released for Microsoft Windows on May 6, 2014, PlayStation 4 on May 6, 2014, and Xbox One on June 18, 2014. Linux and OS X versions were released on March 31, 2015. It serves as an overlapping prequel to the original game, showing the events both before and after the main plotline, and follows Waylon Park, the anonymous tipster to Miles Upshur.

==== Plot ====
A software engineer named Waylon Park works at Mount Massive Asylum, entailing maintenance to the "Morphogenic Engine", which allows Murkoff scientists to manipulate lucid dreams in the hospital's comatose patients. After witnessing the engine's effects on the abused patients, a horrified Waylon sends an anonymous email to Miles Upshur to expose Murkoff's inhumane experiments. Shortly after, Waylon is summoned to the laboratory's operations centre to debug a monitoring system.

When Waylon returns to his office, his supervisor Jeremy Blaire has him detained and exposed to the engine after discovering his email. However, Waylon escapes his restraints when the Walrider is unleashed. He roams the increasingly decrepit facility as surviving guards and medical personnel flee from the newly freed variants, searching for a shortwave radio that he can use to contact the authorities, all the while eluding a cannibal variant, Frank Manera, who wields an electric bone saw. Just as Waylon manages to find a working radio transmitter, Blaire destroys it and tries to suffocate Waylon, but is forced to flee by an approaching Chris Walker.

Waylon finds his way into the hospital's vocational block, where he is captured by Eddie Gluskin, a serial killer obsessed with finding the "perfect bride" by killing other patients and mutilating their genitalia. Gluskin tries to hang Waylon in the hospital's gymnasium with his other victims, but during the struggle, he is entangled by his pulley system and a sudden weight shift causes him to be fatally impaled on a loose section of rebar. As dawn breaks, Murkoff's private military unit arrives at the hospital, intent on eliminating all the variants. Waylon slips past them and escapes into the lobby, where he finds a gravely wounded Blaire.

Blaire suddenly stabs Waylon and insists that no one can know the truth about the hospital before the Walrider kills him. Waylon then stumbles out the open main entrance and towards Miles' jeep, which is still parked near the entrance. He drives away as Miles, now possessed by the Walrider, also emerges from the hospital. In the epilogue, Waylon is sitting at a laptop with his camcorder footage ready for upload as he is prepared to expose the hospital's experiments. An associate informs him that it will be more than enough to ruin Murkoff, but is warned that they will seek to retaliate against him and his family. Despite some initial hesitation, Waylon uploads the footage.

== Development and release ==
Outlast was Red Barrels' first game, although the team was a part of Ubisoft and had worked on major AAA games such as Prince of Persia, Assassin's Creed, and Splinter Cell. The game was made in 14 months with a team of 10 people. Red Barrels' CEO Philippe Morin said in 2018 that they initially could not find anyone to invest in the project for 18 months, though they eventually secured a CA$1,000,000 investment from the Canada Media Fund.

Outlast was released on September 4, 2013, for download through Steam, and it was released on February 4, 2014, for the PlayStation 4 as the free monthly title for PlayStation Plus users. In December 2017, Red Barrels announced that Outlast, including the Whistleblower DLC and Outlast 2, would be coming to the Nintendo Switch in early 2018. The title was released by surprise on February 27, 2018, under the title Outlast: Bundle of Terror via Nintendo eShop.

== Reception ==
Reception

Aggregate score
Aggregator	Score
Metacritic	PC: 80/100; PS4: 78/100; Xbox One: 80/100; NS: 77/100

Review scores
Publication	Score
Destructoid	9/10
Eurogamer	7/10
Game Informer	7.5/10
GameSpot	7/10
IGN	7.8/10
Joystiq	4.5/5
PC Gamer (US)	7.5/10

Outlast received generally positive reviews from critics. The review aggregation website Metacritic gave the Xbox One version a score of 80/100 based on 6 reviews, the Microsoft Windows version 80/100 based on 59 reviews, and the PlayStation 4 version 78/100 based on 33 reviews. It received numerous accolades and awards at E3 2013, including the "Most Likely to Make you Faint" honour, and one of "Best of E3".

The PC gaming website Rock, Paper, Shotgun gave Outlast a very positive review, noting that "Outlast is not an experiment in how games can be scary, it's an exemplification." Marty Sliva of IGN rated the game with a score of 7.8, praising the horror elements and gameplay while criticising the environments and character modelling.

GameSpot gave it a positive review as well, stating that "Outlast isn't really a game of skill, and as it turns out, that makes sense. You're not a cop or a soldier or a genetically enhanced superhero. You're just a reporter. And as a reporter, you don't possess many skills with which you can fend off the hulking brutes, knife-wielding stalkers, and other homicidal maniacs who lurk in the halls of the dilapidated Mount Massive Asylum. You can't shoot them, or punch them, or rip pipes from the walls to clobber them with. You can only run and hide".

== Sequel and prequel ==
On October 23, 2014, Red Barrels revealed that due to the success of Outlast, a sequel was in development. It was initially intended to be released in late 2016, but was delayed to early 2017 due to complications during development. Subsequently, the release date was further pushed to Q2 2017, despite the intended Q1 2017 release. On March 6, 2017, Red Barrels announced that a physical bundle, Outlast Trinity, would be released for Xbox One and PlayStation 4 on April 25.

The sequel, titled Outlast 2, was made digitally available for Microsoft Windows, PlayStation 4, and Xbox One on April 25, 2017; and came to the Nintendo Switch, alongside Outlast, in February 2018. It takes place in the same universe as the first game, but features a new storyline with different characters, set in the Sonoran desert in Arizona, US.

Outlast 3 was announced in December 2017, though no time frame or target platforms were confirmed. During this announcement, Red Barrels said that because they could not easily add downloadable content for Outlast 2, they had a smaller separate project related to Outlast that would be released before Outlast 3. The project, teased in October 2019, is a prequel for both Outlast games, called The Outlast Trials, and is set in the Cold War. The game was released on May 18, 2023 via early access for Microsoft Windows, and for a full launch on March 5, 2024 on Windows, PlayStation 4, Xbox One, Xbox Series X/S, and PlayStation 5.

== Film adaptation ==
On October 30, 2024, it was announced that a film adaptation was in development by Lionsgate Films, with Roy Lee producing and J. T. Petty, who wrote the original game, writing the screenplay.
