= Outlast 2 =

2017 video game

- Developer: Red Barrels
- Publisher: Red Barrels
- Designers: David Chateauneuf; Pierre-Luc Foisy; Philippe Morin
- Programmers: Réjean Charpentier; Mathieu Gauthier; François Vaillancourt
- Artists: Patrice Côté; Hugo Dallaire; Patrick Dubuc; Alexandre Sabourin
- Writer: J. T. Petty
- Composer: Samuel Laflamme
- Engine: Unreal Engine 3
- Platforms: Microsoft Windows; PlayStation 4; Xbox One; Nintendo Switch
- Release: April 25, 2017: Microsoft Windows, PlayStation 4, Xbox One; April 25, 2017; Nintendo Switch; March 27, 2018
- Genre: Survival horror
- Mode: Single-player

Outlast 2 (stylised as OU⸸LAST^{II}) is a 2017 first-person psychological survival horror video game developed and published by Red Barrels. The sequel to Outlast (2013), it revolves around a cameraman named Blake Langermann, who works with his journalist wife, Lynn, to investigate the murder of a pregnant woman in northern Arizona. When they are separated in a helicopter crash, Blake has to find Lynn while travelling through a village inhabited by a deranged cult that believes the Judgement Day is upon them.

Following the critical success and popularity of Outlast, Red Barrels announced a sequel in October 2014. A gameplay demonstration was released at both PAX East and E3 2016 on April 22 and June 15, respectively. Originally scheduled for release in autumn 2016, it was delayed several times and was ultimately released for Microsoft Windows, PlayStation 4, and Xbox One on April 25, 2017, while a Nintendo Switch version was released on March 27, 2018.

Outlast 2 received generally positive reviews upon release, with praise for its graphics, sound design, and atmosphere. Criticisms were directed at the amount of gore, themes, and difficulty. The Murkoff Account, a comic book series set between Outlast and Outlast 2, was released from July 2016 to November 2017, while a prequel game, The Outlast Trials, was released on March 5, 2024.

== Gameplay ==
Like its predecessor, Outlast 2 is a first-person single-player survival horror that continues the found footage characteristics from the first game. The player assumes the role of a cameraman named Blake Langermann, who investigates a dilapidated rural area in Supai, Northern Arizona, United States, near the western edge of the Colorado Plateau.

The player cannot fight except in scripted scenes, and so they must run and hide from the numerous hostile enemies across the game. The player can also crouch, run, jump, walk, vault, slide, and climb much like the first game and can hide in lockers, barrels, wardrobes, beds, water pools, tall grass, cornfields, and houses. The player has a limited stamina meter, and must manage how long they run, or else they will become exhausted and move more slowly.

Langermann possesses only a camcorder with night vision capabilities, though the camcorder's batteries are also drained when night vision is used. Compared to the first game, his status as a cameraman means he carries a more advanced camera, one with clearer footage, zoom, and a sensitive microphone that can be used to detect distant footsteps and other noises. The player is equipped with an inventory system displaying the amount of footage recorded on the camera and the items they are carrying. Spare batteries suitable for the camcorder and bandage to heal injuries are spread throughout the game. The game takes influence from horror films like The Hills Have Eyes (1977), Race with the Devil (1975), and The Blair Witch Project (1999).

== Plot ==
An assisting cameraman named Blake Langermann works for his wife, Lynn, an investigative journalist, who is investigating the murder of a pregnant teenager only known as Jane Doe. The couple have a helicopter pilot fly them over the area where Jane Doe possibly came from, but they are suddenly hit by a mysterious blinding light and the helicopter crash-lands in the Supai region of Coconino County, Arizona, United States. When Blake wakes up after the crash, he finds the pilot skinned alive and Lynn missing.

Blake makes his way to the nearby town of Temple Gate, where he learns that the residents sacrificed all their children in the name of God, and eventually locates Lynn in a chapel. She is being held hostage by a violent, delirious Christian cult led by the preacher Sullivan Knoth, who rapes the local women and, once they are pregnant, executes them on suspicion of carrying the Antichrist. Knoth claims that Temple Gate lies on the mouth of Hell, and that Lynn is pregnant with said offspring. The couple escape the chapel, but Lynn falters, suffering from stomach cramps. They are separated when Lynn is kidnapped by a Satanic splinter group known as the 'Heretics' and their androgynous leader Val, who wish to hasten Judgement Day by witnessing the Antichrist's birth.

As Blake is rescued by a local named Ethan, who has left Knoth's cult, and gives him refuge in his home, it is revealed that Ethan's daughter Anna Lee is Jane Doe after he explains that he helped her to escape Temple Gate. While Blake rests, Marta, a gigantic and imposing woman wielding a large pickaxe and one of Knoth's executioners, breaks into Ethan's home and murders him after accusing him of heresy. Blake flees through town from Marta and the cult to another chapel, where he learns while hidden from a tortured Heretic being interrogated by Knoth that Lynn was taken to the mines near Temple Gate.

Throughout his journey, Blake is repeatedly assaulted by the blinding light and suffers from increasingly disturbing hallucinations of his childhood's Catholic high school of St. Sybil, while pursued by a demon. The hallucinations gradually reveal the events surrounding the apparent suicide of the Langermanns' childhood friend Jessica Gray. It is ultimately revealed that Jessica was molested and murdered by their music teacher, Father Loutermilch, who manipulated Blake into keeping quiet about the incident while making it look like Jessica had hanged herself, and the demon chasing Blake is a twisted version of Loutermilch.

Blake leaves the town for the mines, but ends up by accident in the forest occupied by the syphilis-infected 'Scalled', who were cast out from Temple Gate. He is captured by the Scalled's abusive, dwarfish leader Laird Byron and his hulking mount Nick Tremblay, who believe he is the Scalled's Messiah. Blake eventually escapes when Laird's and Nick's followers betray and kill them. He also finds a document revealing that the Murkoff Corporation is responsible for everyone's insanity in the region due to an experimental mind control station hidden deep in the mountains, which is also the cause of the blinding light seen by Blake.

Reaching the mines, Blake enters the Heretics' underground temple and finds Lynn visibly pregnant during a ritual. Knoth's cult also reach the mines to kill the Heretics, which allows the couple to flee. As dawn breaks, a lightning storm begins to destroy the town. Marta reappears and attacks the couple, but is fatally impaled with a cross toppled from a chapel in the distance. Taking shelter, Lynn gives birth but dies in the process and Blake blacks out holding the newborn—implied to be a hallucination by Lynn's last words and the baby's lack of a shadow. (Note: In the second issue of The Murkoff Account comic book, it is explained that one in three women in Mount Massive Asylum experience phantom symptoms of pregnancy, a side effect from the experiments being conducted there. This phenomenon affects everyone in Temple Gate too as Murkoff's mind control station creates the illusion that certain women in the area are pregnant when they are not.) Knoth greets Blake as he wakes up and implores him to kill the child before slitting his own throat.

As Blake walks outside, he finds that Knoth's followers have committed mass suicide via poisoning. The sun grows brighter, and Blake hallucinates being engulfed by its light. (Note: In the sixth issue of The Murkoff Account comic book, the blinding light is actually caused by Murkoff's mind control station exploding due to the Walrider's attack. When the Murkoff Insurance Mitigation Department arrive at Temple Gate, they discover Blake in a catatonic state and no baby in sight.) He has a final vision of chasing Jessica through the school; when Blake finds her, Jessica promises that she will never let him go, and they start praying.

== Development ==
After the critical success of Outlast, Red Barrels confirmed the development of a sequel on October 23, 2014. It was also reported that the characters and setting would be greatly different in comparison to the first game, as players would not return to Mount Massive Asylum in the sequel. In an interview with Bloody Disgusting, their co-founder Philippe Morin stated that "we really want to keep improving our craft, but ultimately we'll approach things the same way."

On October 28, on both Red Barrels' Facebook and Twitter accounts, a post featured a bulletin board with documents posted saying, "Classified", and the word "Tomorrow" across the picture. The next day, the teaser trailer for the game was released on their YouTube account. On January 26, 2016, when asked about the possibility of being released simultaneously and pre-order, Red Barrels replied that it might be possible but were not exactly sure.

On February 5, 2015, Morin was interviewed by Indie Games Level Up! about the game, in which he stated that it was largely based on the 1978 Jonestown mass murder-suicide. The game's main antagonist, Sullivan Knoth, has been compared to the cult leader Jim Jones. On April 4, a video named "Jude 1:14-15" was released by Red Barrels. Unlike other teasers, the video contains a cross of Saint Peter across a background of clouds, with an ominous back masked audio message. Played in reverse, the message reads:

"Children, you lovers of God and registration defenders of His paradise—all our years of suffering come together now on this glorious day of peace... Peace! Even in the corrupt and filthy tongue of the Romans, in the Puritan city... On the fourth month and the twenty-second day of the sixteenth year of the third millennium, our reckoning begins. The spider-eyed lamb waits at the harlot's brace, hungry for this world! Ready your knives, for the good earth thirsts for blood, and we, like the angels, must show no mercy. God loves you."

On April 23, the game demo was showcased and released at PAX East 2016 and E3 2016 on June 15. On August 26, Samuel Laflamme, the original composer for Outlast, officially announced his return to compose the game's soundtrack, as well as the upcoming possibility of another teaser. Unlike the previous game, Outlast 2 does not feature any downloadable content. The developer stated, "while the first Outlast was made with the idea of a DLC in mind, that was not the case for Outlast 2. We’ve considered many options, but none of them felt appropriate for a DLC. Outlast 2 was created to make you feel like a rat in a maze, without any knowledge of what’s outside the maze."

== Soundtrack ==
The game soundtrack, composed by Samuel Laflamme, was released on April 25, 2017. The album contains 14 original tracks composed by Laflamme, as well as an excerpt from Ave verum corpus composed by Wolfgang Amadeus Mozart on track 14 "you Never let me go". Contrasting to the original game, Outlast's soundtrack, which focuses on orchestral arrangements, Laflamme focused on utilising instruments such as guitars, bass guitars, percussion, and instruments he and his team made himself. Laflamme then modulates and tweaks these sounds through a process called Modular Filtering.

In order to achieve the desired sounds for the game without the use of an orchestra, Laflamme created an instrument consisting of a metal string attached to a piece of wood. He then used this instrument throughout the score as the instrument "really fit with the overall score". The soundtrack is available on all streaming platforms and was released in the first quarter of 2019 as a Double LP Vinyl Set featuring the music of the first and second game, respectively on two Glow in the Dark and Black Splatter vinyl pressings. Each capital letter of the track-listing spells the word "Redemption", with the album consisting of 14 tracks in total.

== Release ==
The game was made available digitally on April 25, 2017, for Microsoft Windows, PlayStation 4, and Xbox One. Alongside the digital launch, Outlast Trinity, a physical collection of the Outlast series was also released. The game was originally scheduled for release in autumn 2016, as stated on the teaser trailer; however, on August 1, the company announced that the game's release would be postponed until the first quarter of 2017.

About a month prior to release, the Australian Classification Board refused to grant Outlast 2 an "R18+" rating, the most extreme it can grant video games, citing that the game depicts "sexual violence"; without a rating, a video game cannot be sold in Australian stores. Ultimately, after a few days, the board reversed its decision without any modifications to the game and rated the game "R18+", eventually permitting it to be sold.

In July 2016, Red Barrels announced The Murkoff Account, a six-issue online comic book series that follows the Murkoff Insurance Litigation agents Paul Marion and Pauline Glick, known as the Pauls, whose job is to make sure that Murkoff is not paying more than it needs to in order to protect the company's interests. Their story bridges the gap between Outlast and Outlast 2.

In December 2017, Red Barrels announced that Outlast 2, along with Outlast and its downloadable content, Outlast: Whistleblower, would be coming to the Nintendo Switch in early 2018.

Due to feedback from players and critics alike, Red Barrels released an update in March 2018 with a new difficulty mode called "Story Mode." The difficulty mode decreases the number of enemies as well as their speed, damage and perception. Players can still die in the game, but "Story Mode" allows them to have more time to explore the environments and be immersed in the story. The update additionally reinstated some content that was initially removed to get an M rating as opposed to an "Adults Only" rating.

== Reception ==
Reception

Aggregate score
| Aggregator | Score |
|---|---|
| Metacritic | PC: 75/100; PS4: 68/100; XONE: 77/100; NS: 79/100 |

Review scores
| Publication | Score |
|---|---|
| Destructoid | 8/10 |
| Game Informer | 7.75/10 |
| GameRevolution | 4.5/5 stars |
| GameSpot | 7/10 |
| GamesRadar+ | 2.5/5 stars |
| IGN | 8.3/10 |
| PC Gamer (US) | 85/100 |
| Polygon | 7.5/10 |
| VideoGamer.com | 6/10 |

Outlast 2 received generally positive reviews from critics but received "mixed or average" reviews for the PlayStation 4 version.

Destructoid's Nic Rowen scored the game an 8/10 with the consensus "Impressive effort with a few noticeable problems holding it back. Won't astound everyone but is worth most people's time and cash."

James Kozanitis from Game Revolution gave the game a score of 4.5 out of 5 stars saying that "A good horror game should make you dread the idea of playing it, but keep you glued to the screen while you actually are. Outlast 2 is that game. While more involved fans might be disappointed as to how the story resolves, I found it hit the sweet spot between overly expository and frustratingly vague. Segments from Outlast 2 are forever burned into my memories, acting as much as a traumatic experience as it was an exhilarating one. The thematic elements present throughout make the game even more high stakes, taking a toll on you as a moral human being. God doesn't love Outlast 2 – not like I do."

Louise Blain of GamesRadar+ awarded it 2.5 out of 5 stars stating that, "Horrific in completely the wrong way, Outlast 2 is a night-vision journey into frustration. An intriguing story just can't save the infuriating misery that awaits."

Lucy O'Brien's score of 8.3/10 on IGN said that "Outlast 2 is a terrifying successor to the 2013 original that keeps the scares coming at a relentless pace."

"Stealth and pursuit haven't changed much in Outlast 2, but it excels as a beautiful, brutal journey through extreme spiritual anxieties," was James Davenport's conclusion on PC Gamer with a score of 85/100.

7.5/10 was Philip Kollar's score on Polygon with the consensus: "Outlast 2 may be the single most qualified recommendation I've given in my history of writing reviews, and not just because of its occasionally stilted design. This is a game that often left me feeling like complete trash. It brought up some of the most difficult memories in my life, issues I had buried long ago. My reactions to that anguish have run the gamut, but more than anything, I respect that Outlast 2 has the singular focus and intensity to dredge up those emotions; that alone made it worth the time spent for me."

Alice Bell's 6/10 score on VideoGamer.com stated that "Outlast 2 has some great design elements, and the night-vision handy-cam mechanic is still scary. But the jump scares and gore don't mix right with the elements of psychological horror, and the story retreads horror tropes that didn't need retreading."

The game was nominated for "Use of Sound, Franchise" at the National Academy of Video Game Trade Reviewers Awards.

== Future ==
=== Sequel ===
Outlast 3 was announced in December 2017, though no time frame or target platforms were confirmed. During this announcement, Red Barrels said that, because they could not easily add downloadable content for Outlast 2 due to its structure, they would have a smaller separate project related to Outlast releasing before Outlast 3, that project being The Outlast Trials.

=== Prequel ===
The Outlast Trials was released in early access for Windows on May 18, 2023, and is a prequel to both Outlast and Outlast 2. The premise revolves around involuntary test subjects in a mysterious Cold War experiment organised by the Murkoff Corporation to test brainwashing and mind control. The player must undergo a series of "trials" and accomplish various tasks while avoiding enemies.

Unlike the previous games, The Outlast Trials can be played both solo or as a co-op game.
