= Robot Entertainment =

American video game development company

- Type: Private
- Industry: Video games
- Predecessor: Ensemble Studios
- Founded: February 2009
- Headquarters: Plano, Texas, United States
- Key people: Tony Goodman, Patrick Hudson, Harter Ryan
- Products: Age of Empires Online; Orcs Must Die! series Hero Academy series Echo Prime; ReadySet Heroes
- Number of employees: 30
- Website: www.robotentertainment.com

Robot Entertainment is an American video game developer and publisher based in Plano, Texas. Its founders previously founded Ensemble Studios, which was shut down by Microsoft. Other members of the company founded another studio, Bonfire Studios (later renamed as Zynga Dallas upon acquisition by Zynga). Robot Entertainment took over Ensemble's responsibility of maintaining and updating Halo Wars until February 28, 2010, when Microsoft Studios assumed control of the game servers and updates. Also, in January 2011, Microsoft Studios took over updates and servers for Age of Empires III. Robot Entertainment have since released games including Orcs Must Die!, Orcs Must Die! 2, Hero Academy, Echo Prime, Orcs Must Die! Unchained, Hero Academy 2 and ReadySet Heroes.

== History ==
On July 10, 2010, the company announced that it was working on two games; the first of which was published by Microsoft Studios, and is a real-time strategy game, similar to the Age of Empires series.

On August 17, 2010, the company announced the new game, Age of Empires Online. The game features a new stylized, 'cartoon' look, with Robot promising that it would offer gameplay depth. On 24 February 2011, Robot announced that Gas Powered Games would be taking over development on Age of Empires Online. Robot Entertainment President Patrick Hudson stated that handing over the development was expected, saying, "The plan was always to move to [an] original IP as soon as we had the ability to focus on our core business goal."

On February 24, 2011, the company announced the new game Orcs Must Die!. The game was published by Robot Entertainment as well as being self-developed by them.

On November 17, 2011, the company announced the new game Hero Academy. It is the company's first game developed for mobile devices.

In June 2012, Robot Entertainment partnered with Yodo1 in an effort to release a Chinese version of Hero Academy.

On February 27, 2015, it was announced that Tencent Holdings have bought an undisclosed, minority stake in Robot Entertainment.

On March 27, 2018, Robot Entertainment laid off over 30 employees following the release of Hero Academy 2.

While the Tencent investment had helped the studio for some years, Orcs Must Die! Unchained failed to be profitable for the company, and in January 2019, announced that it would be closing the servers later that year for Unchained, as well as for Hero Academy and its sequel. Additionally, Robot downsized to less than 25 employees. Despite the downsizing, the company stated that it had two games in development.

The first of these games was revealed as Ready Set Heroes, a PlayStation 4 game developed in partnership with Sony Interactive Entertainment and announced during the March 2019 Sony's "State of Play" stream.

The second game, Orcs Must Die! 3 was announced at the 2019 Gamescom event in August and released on July 14, 2020 as a timed exclusive on Stadia, with other platforms to be announced at a later date. According to CEO Patrick Hudson, Robot Entertainment had been ready to shelve the Orcs Must Die series after deciding to shut down Unchained and to focus on smaller games, but while meeting with Google to discuss opportunities for the Stadia platform, they found that Google's developers were fans of the Orcs Must Die series, leading to this new title which is partially funded by Google. It was released on Steam, PlayStation 4, Xbox One, and Xbox Series X/S on July 23, 2021

== Games ==
Year	Title	Platforms	Genre
2011	Age of Empires Online	Microsoft Windows	Real-time strategy
2011	Orcs Must Die!	Microsoft Windows, Xbox 360	Action, tower defense
2012	Hero Academy	Android, iOS, macOS, Microsoft Windows	Turn-based tactics
2012	Orcs Must Die! 2	Microsoft Windows	Action, tower defense
2013	Echo Prime	iOS, Microsoft Windows	Action role-playing game
2017	Orcs Must Die! Unchained	Microsoft Windows, PlayStation 4	Action, tower defense
2017	Hero Academy 2	Android, iOS, macOS, Microsoft Windows	Turn-based tactics
2019	ReadySet Heroes	Microsoft Windows, PlayStation 4	Dungeon crawler, party
2020	Orcs Must Die! 3	Microsoft Windows, PlayStation 4, PlayStation 5, Stadia, Xbox One, Xbox Series X/S	Action, tower defense
2025	Orcs Must Die! Deathtrap	Microsoft Windows, Xbox Series X/S, PlayStation 5	Action, Tower defense
