= Orcs Must Die! 2 =

2012 video game

- Orcs Must Die! 2 logo
- Developer: Robot Entertainment
- Publisher: Robot Entertainment
- Series: Orcs Must Die!
- Engine: Vision
- Platform: Microsoft Windows
- Release: July 30, 2012
- Genres: Tower defense, action
- Modes: Single-player, multiplayer

Orcs Must Die! 2 is a trap based action-tower defense video game developed by Robot Entertainment as the follow-up to the original Orcs Must Die!, with Microsoft Game Studios publishing the sequel for Microsoft Windows on July 30, 2012 in the United States. The game has emphasis on co-operative gameplay as the principal addition over the original.

== Gameplay ==
Like its predecessor, Orcs Must Die! 2 is a variation on a tower defense game. As either the War Mage or Sorceress in the campaign mode, the player must attempt to defend one or more Rifts (up to 3) from an onslaught of orc armies that emerge from one or more doors in a given level. The orc armies arrive in waves, between which the player is given time to recover and place additional traps; except for Nightmare difficulty, roughly every three waves includes a longer respite that lets the player determine when to release the next wave.

To defeat the orcs, the player selects a number of traps, spells, and equipment from their Spellbook (up to ten in single player modes). Placing traps can be done at any time, but costs a certain amount of in-game currency to do so; this money is either given at the start of the level and as bonuses between level, for killing orcs, or as coins that can be picked up by the player. Traps can also be sold back but only during breaks between waves. Traps include those that are placed on ground, wall, or ceiling, which typically activate once and then require a short reset period before they are ready again; traps can also include Guardians, creatures that will act on their own like archers or knights, who can be injured and knocked down by the orcs until either the major respite between waves or by the player with special equipment. The player can also fight directly using weapons from their Spellbook, including magical abilities that consume mana. The player must watch their health; if they lose their health or fall off a level, they will respawn immediately but lose a number of Rift points. Players can heal by being near a Rift, collecting health or mana potions dropped by defeated orcs, or using special equipment.

Every orc that makes it through the player's traps to a Rift will cost a number of Rift points. If the Rift points drop to zero, the level is considered lost and the player will have to start again. Otherwise, if the player successfully completes the level, they are awarded a number of skulls; up to five skulls are earned based on the number of Rift points remaining and the how long it took to complete the level, and additional skulls can be gained based on score or collected from fallen orcs. The first five skulls can only be earned once on any level, while the bonus skulls are earned every time the level is played. Skulls are used to improve traps and equipment that will permanently remain with that player, allowing players to return to earlier levels with improved traps and equipment as to improve their score. Within the sequel, each trap and equipment can now be boosted up by three levels and include one or more optional improvements, such as causing additional status effects on affected orcs when activated, but only one of these improvements can be activate at any time for that trap or equipment. Players are also rewarded with a new trap or equipment the first time they complete a level.

The game includes a cooperative mode, where one player plays as the War Mage and the other as the Sorceress; within the campaign, the two characters gain traps and equipment in different order as rewards for completing levels, but players can purchase new traps with skulls as well. In this mode, each player can be only 5 trap spells or equipment in addition to their main weapon. Within the game, players can interact with certain traps placed by the other player - such as triggering a ceiling rock fall - but otherwise cannot sell the other player's traps. Equipment can have benefits that apply to both players, such as an artifact that passively improves the speed of trap resets.

In addition to campaign mode, the game includes an "Endless" mode for both single and cooperative mode, where the players must hold off forty waves of orcs from all the various types in the game. The game offers weekly challenges, typically restricting the players to one or two types of traps and equipment. Additional downloadable content provides new levels, traps, equipment and monster types. The players also gain the ability to buy new costumes for their characters.

== Plot ==
The game takes place some time after the events of Orcs Must Die!. The Sorceress is hiding from The Mob when mysteriously, a Rift opens next to her. She steps through, and finds herself in the Dwarven Mines, right in front of The War Mage, who now works at the mines. She enlists his help in fighting off the Orcs. The two discover that more and more rifts are opening in different locations. They decide to enter the rift and return to the Dead World.

It is revealed that the War Mage's master had not died; he was still alive, and had opened a small, weak rift to allow the Sorceress to escape and battle the Mob together. After the War Mage and the Sorceress begin to communicate with their master, he explains that he started to open the Rifts again because the world beyond the Rifts could not cope without the magic the Rifts provided.

After the two have defended the last Rift, the magic fully returned to the world. The War Mage's master disappeared and the War Mage states that he and the Sorceress will 'always be out there on the Fortress walls, guarding the Rifts and protecting the world, because they (the Orc Mob) will always be out there'.

== Reception ==
Reception

Aggregate score
Aggregator	Score
Metacritic	83/100

Review scores
Publication	Score
Destructoid	9/10
Edge	8/10
Eurogamer	8/10
Game Informer	9.25/10
GameSpot	8/10
GameSpy	4.5/5
GameTrailers	8.5/10
IGN	9/10
Joystiq	4.5/5
PC Gamer (UK)	84%
PC PowerPlay	8/10
The Escapist	4.5/5
Metro UK	8/10

Orcs Must Die! 2 received "favorable" reviews according to the review aggregation website Metacritic.

The Digital Fix gave a score nine out of ten, praising the gameplay, graphics and the addition of co-op play. The Escapist also gave it four-and-a-half stars out of five and called it a fun and quirky title. Metro UK gave the game a score of eight out of ten, giving praise to the gameplay and co-op mode, but criticized its random difficulty level and lack of visual upgrades.

During the 16th Annual D.I.C.E. Awards, the Academy of Interactive Arts & Sciences nominated Orcs Must Die! 2 for "Strategy/Simulation Game of the Year".

== Sequels ==
A third installment of the franchise called Orcs Must Die! Unchained was released in 2017 for Windows and PlayStation 4. The game is a multiplayer-only free-to-play game, able to support up to 5v5 battles between two factions (The Order and The Unchained).

A direct sequel to Orcs Must Die! 2, Orcs Must Die! 3, was released initially for Stadia on July 14, 2020. It was later released on other platforms in 2021 for Steam, Xbox One, Xbox Series X/S and PlayStation 4, and for PlayStation 5 in 2022.
