= Orcs Must Die! =

2011 video game

- Developer: Robot Entertainment
- Publishers: WW: Robot Entertainment; EU: Mastertronic (PC)
- Series: Orcs Must Die!
- Engine: Vision
- Platforms: Xbox 360; Microsoft Windows
- Release: XBLA; October 5, 2011; Windows / OnLive: NA: October 12, 2011; EU: July 13, 2012
- Genres: Tower defense, action

Orcs Must Die! is an action-tower defense video game developed and published by Robot Entertainment and Mastertronic. Like tower defense games, it involves placing defenses to wear down and stop waves of enemies. Unlike them, it abandons a bird's eye overview and instead places the player in the middle of the action in a third-person viewpoint where they can fight and be fought personally.

The game was released for Xbox Live Arcade and Windows PCs in October 2011.

== Gameplay ==
Placing spike traps. Each will damage all enemies on it once, then retract to reload.

The player as the War Mage must defend one or more magical rifts on each level from an onslaught of orcs and other creatures that emerge from one or more entrances and traverse the level. Each orc that reaches a rift deducts a point from the starting rift score while larger creatures may take off more points; if the rift score drops to zero, the level is lost and the player will have to start it again.

The orcs arrive in increasingly more difficult waves, with each level having between four and twelve waves. Waves will begin a few seconds after the player defeats the prior one, but every three waves on all bar Nightmare difficulty, the player is given a break where they can set up traps and initiate the next wave when they are ready.

As the War Mage, the player has the ability to place numerous traps and arm themselves with weapons and equipment to defeat the orcs. The player selects a number of traps and equipment (up to ten) from their spellbook; once the player starts placing traps they will be bound to this selection. Traps can be placed on any appropriate surface, but each trap costs money to place. Traps typically work once and then have a reset period before they will activate again. Such traps include floor, wall, and ceiling traps, and bow- or swordsman Guardians that will act on their own accord. The player is given an amount of money to spend on trap placement at the start, and earns more by killing orcs and after completing waves; money can also be dropped by certain monsters to be collected by the player. Traps can be placed at any time, including in combat, and between waves, placed traps can be removed and refunded for their cost. Later, the player gains the support of Weavers and can choose one for each attempt at a level. Weavers are offscreen women who address the War Mage vaguely flirtatiously and allow the player to buy various upgrades for that attempt from a tiny technology tree.

Once the player initiates a wave, they can run about the level to participate in combat or place additional traps. The player must watch their health and mana used for their weapons but orcs may drop health and mana potions that will replenish these; alternatively the player heals while in proximity of the rift. If the player should lose all their health or fall off the level, they will respawn back at the rift but this will cost them a number of rift points.

After defeating the last wave, the player is rated 1 to 5 skulls (limited to two on Apprentice difficulty), based on rift points remaining and beating a set time. Each trap has one improvement that can be purchased with skulls, such as increasing damage, reducing cost, or stunning its targets. The player, after completing each level the first time, is also rewarded with something new they can use in subsequent levels. These improvements remain with the player, so that they may return to earlier levels and try for better ratings to earn more skulls.

== Plot ==
In a fantasy world, civilization is dependent on magic that's used to bring the rains, cure the sick, erect enchanted fortresses, and so on, and which comes from rifts, openings leading to "the dead world of the orcs". The game takes place entirely within great fortresses built on the far side of the rifts, where incursions of the orcs, a race of murderous savages, are held at bay by an elite faction of wizards and warriors called the Order. The dregs of the Order are a cranky old master war mage who loathes his apprentice, dies in an accident in the opening cutscene, and takes up the role of narrating the game's cinematics, and his apprentice, a dim-witted egoist fool and the player character, who takes up his master's weapons and is known as the War Mage (voiced by Robert McCollum). Despite grim trappings, the game has a generally light-hearted tone and the War Mage turns out to be a savant, tearing through force after force of attacking orcs (and ogres and gnolls, etc.) and having the time of his life. For example, he ends each successful level with a victory dance that grows more elaborate the better he performed, including doing the splits if the player is rated the full five skulls out of five.

As he defends fortress after fortress, the War Mage notes that the orc attacks are becoming more organized, striking where the Order's defenses are thin and incorporating creatures that have no business cooperating with orcs. He brushes it off as more to kill, but the orcs have turned from a mob into an invading army and the Order, always vastly outnumbered and forced to rely on the disorder of their enemy, is gradually ground into the dirt offscreen leaving the War Mage as the only surivor.

The culprit is revealed to be the Sorceress (voiced by Colleen Clinkenbeard), a former paragon of the Order who betrayed it to seek power for herself. She has mind controlled the orcs, and is trying to take them to the world of her origin to rule both worlds. She speaks in the War Mage's mind with threats, promises, taunts and attempts at seduction, and gets nowhere, the War Mage being more concerned with killing orcs. Eventually he concludes that his position is hopeless and uses magic to close the rifts, destroying all magic on both sides forever. In doing so he strands the Sorceress with her enraged erstwhile slaves, gives up his dream job, and saves his world from the orcs but dooms it to decline. His master muses that everyone in the Order knew the end of magic was the end of the orc threat, but only one was able to bear the dire consequences to their world. He is left pondering whether he witnessed supreme courage or supreme stupidity.

== Reception ==
Reception

Aggregate score
| Aggregator | Score | |
| Aggregator | PC | Xbox 360 |
|---|---|---|
| Metacritic | 83/100 | 79/100 |

Review scores
| Publication | Score | |
| Publication | PC | Xbox 360 |
|---|---|---|
| Destructoid | N/A | 8.5/10 |
| Eurogamer | N/A | 7/10 |
| Game Informer | N/A | 8.5/10 |
| GamePro | N/A | 4.5/5 |
| GameSpot | 7.5/10 | 7.5/10 |
| GameSpy | 4.5/5 | N/A |
| GameTrailers | N/A | 7.7/10 |
| GameZone | N/A | 9/10 |
| IGN | 9/10 | 9/10 |
| Joystiq | N/A | 4/5 |
| Official Xbox Magazine (US) | N/A | 8/10 |
| PC Gamer (UK) | 90% | N/A |
| 411Mania | N/A | 7.3/10 |

The game received "favorable" reviews on both platforms according to the review aggregation website Metacritic.

Joystiq called the Xbox 360 version a "finely-tuned whirling chamber of death". IGN praised the length of the campaign as well as the combat system. It sold over 50,000 units on Xbox and substantially more on PC.

During the 15th Annual Interactive Achievement Awards, the Academy of Interactive Arts & Sciences awarded Orcs Must Die! with "Strategy/Simulation Game of the Year", along with receiving a nomination for "Downloadable Game of the Year".

== Sequels ==
Orcs Must Die! 2 was released on July 30, 2012. The sequel includes two-player co-op with the introduction of the Sorceress in a playable role. Orcs Must Die! Unchained, the third game in the series, was released on April 18, 2017 for the Windows platform, while the PlayStation 4 version was released on July 18. It was released under a free-to-play model.

Orcs Must Die! 3 was initially released on Stadia on July 14, 2020, and later for Windows, PlayStation 4, PlayStation 5, Xbox One and Xbox Series X/S. Unlike previous games, which generally had a dungeon and tower defense design with limited pathways for enemies to attack from, Orcs Must Die! 3 features larger, open battlefields in a feature called "War Scenarios".

Orcs Must Die! Deathtrap, which features 4-player cooperative multiplayer and elements commonly found in roguelite games, was released in January 2025, for Windows and Xbox Series X/S.
