= Robo Defense =

2009 video game

- Developer: Lupis Labs
- Publisher: Lupis Labs
- Platform: Android
- Release: 16 September 2009
- Genre: Real-time strategy
- Mode: Single-player

Robo Defense is a real-time strategy tower defense video game developed by Lupis Labs and released on 16 September 2009 for Android.

== Gameplay ==
Robo Defense features five maps and, at the beginning, ten difficulty levels which the player may select. Additional difficulty levels may be unlocked through gameplay. Enemies do not actively fight back, though will attempt to cross the map and enter the player's base. Killing enemies rewards "cash" to buy in-game upgrades, and "points" which may be used to purchase tower upgrades from the title menu. The player loses a health bar for every enemy that manages to pass to the other end of the map. If the health bar goes to zero, the player loses the game.

To combat advancing waves of enemies, the player may place towers by dragging them from the bottom right corner and into the field of play. Towers may be upgraded by tapping them and selecting the desired upgrade.

There are several tower variants: "Machine Gun Towers", "Rocket Towers", "Slow Towers" and "Mine Towers".

The map may be scrolled by dragging a finger across the screen, and the game may be paused or sped up using dedicated icons in the bottom left corner.

== Development ==
The game was released for Android on 16 September 2009 by Lupis Labs. The game has two different versions: the paid version and the free version. The paid version of the game has five different maps and unlimited difficulties, while the free version comes with only one map and 11 difficulties and doesn't allow the player to save in-game progress.

== Reception ==
=== Sales and accolades ===
The game was named as the best-selling premium Android game in October 2009 and was downloaded 7,600 times over the course of the month. From January to March 2011, the game regained the title of the best-selling premium Android game and was downloaded 186 thousand times in the Android Market.

=== Critical response ===
The game received mostly positive reviews, with some comparing the game to Fieldrunners. Jon Mundy, writing for Pocket Gamer, stated that the game was heavily inspired by "medieval siege warfare". He also described the game as a clone of Fieldrunners that almost has the same graphics when compared to Fieldrunners. The reviewer praised the game for giving opportunity for players to upgrade and modify the turret tower, since it makes the game significantly differ from the more straightforward gameplay of Fieldrunners.

Andrew Podolsky from GameSpot lauded the game as "precise, well executed, and works very well". Despite criticizing the game as less impressive and the inability to zoom in and out in the opening and ending of the review, Podolsky later praised the game's distinctiveness for allowing the player to increase the level of the turret tower between level changes and the game's ability to customize difficulty and maps.

Ryan Paul of Ars Technica praised the artwork with regards to the units and terrain, and the save system which preserves the game state between sessions. He criticized the simplistic user interface and time-consuming gameplay.
