= GemCraft =

- Developer: Game In A Bottle
- Publishers: Armor Games (Flash); NTT Resonant Inc. (iOS)
- Platforms: Browser, iOS
- Release: June 26, 2008 (The Forgotten); April 16, 2009 (Gem of Eternity); February 17, 2011 (Labyrinth); April 14, 2011 (Labyrinth – iOS); April 4, 2014 (Chasing Shadows); January 10, 2020 (Frostborn Wrath)
- Genres: Tower defense, Real-time strategy
- Mode: Single-player

GemCraft is a series of tower defense games created by Hungarian studio Game In A Bottle, in which magical gems are used as the primary means of offense and defense. The first game, titled GemCraft Chapter One: The Forgotten (also known simply as "GemCraft"), is a tower defense flash game originally released on June 26, 2008. A prequel, GemCraft Chapter 0: Gem of Eternity, was released on April 16, 2009, and a disconnected chapter, GemCraft Lost Chapter: Labyrinth, was released February 17, 2011. On April 4, 2014 the sequel to the first game GemCraft Chapter Two: Chasing Shadows was released. The original game was released for iOS on April 14, 2011 by NTT Resonant. On 30 April, 2015, Chasing Shadows was released on Steam under the publisher ArmorGames. The next game, GemCraft Lost Chapter: Frostborn Wrath, was released in January 2020. GemCraft - Legacy Collection, a version containing the first three games was released on Steam in 2026.

In GemCraft, players are given gems to combine and place into towers. Different combinations of gems produce different effects, such as splash damage, damage over time, and critical hit capability. The player's life bar and magic energy are represented by the same statistic – mana. With mana, the player can forge and combine gems and build towers, trenches, and traps. A key aspect of strategy in GemCraft is to increase the player's mana gain to high levels, enabling creation of stronger and stronger gems. Combining two gems creates a single more powerful gem, with the gem's power level indicated by its shape.

== Plot ==
The series is set in a fantasy world. It depicts the battles of wizards against a powerful demon known as "The Forgotten". Wizards used to regularly summon demons to do their bidding until they brought forth a demon too powerful for them to control, who was also capable of subduing other demons under her command. Described as "a fully black female torso with disfigured arms, a head with long hair and no face", the Forgotten commands her legions in order to conquer the "Spiritforge", the last bastion of the wizards, in order to become omnipotent. There is no known way to destroy The Forgotten or to banish her back to the Demon Realm from which she was summoned. Instead, she can be sealed away by a powerful artifact known as a "Gem of Eternity", but it can only contain her for a few decades before she escapes, and each time she escapes, a new gem must be crafted in order to capture her again.

== Reception ==
Gamezebo gave the original GemCraft game a rating of 3.5/5, stating: "While GemCraft isn't a revolutionary effort, it adds some new wrinkles into the usual 'build, defend, build' cycle in the genre re-popularized by Desktop Tower Defense."

Pocket Gamer UK gave it a rating of 4/5, saying: "GemCraft is an unusual tower defence game with a wealth of content and some clever twists to the usual formula."

The original game currently holds a metascore of 68 on Metacritic. GemCraft Chapter Two: Chasing Shadows and GemCraft - Frostborn Wrath hold a user score of 8.0 and 8.1 respectively.
