= AI War: Fleet Command =

2009 video game

- Developer: Arcen Games
- Publisher: Arcen Games
- Designer: Christopher M. Park
- Composer: Pablo Vega
- Engine: Unity
- Platforms: Windows, Mac OS X, Linux
- Release: Windows; June 2, 2009; Mac OS X; October 14, 2010; Linux; August 26, 2014
- Genre: Real-time strategy
- Modes: Single-player, multiplayer

AI War: Fleet Command is a real time strategy video game created by independent developer Arcen Games. The game was first released on the Arcen Games website and Impulse on June 2, 2009, before getting a Steam release on October 16, 2009, that coincided with the release of version 2.0. AI War blends the 4X, tower defense, and traditional RTS genre to create something that was hailed as unique but with a steep learning curve. Players go up against two artificial intelligence (AI) opponents that are superior to the player. The objective is to destroy the home planets of both AI opponents.

AI War was lauded by reviewers for being a fresh take on the RTS genre and bringing something new to the table, but criticized for its learning curve and lackluster graphics. It was also noted that the AI represented a significant challenge and reacted to the actions of the player. An expansion titled The Zenith Remnant was released on January 12, 2010 that adds new factions, AI types, ships and new gameplay mechanics. As of October 27, 2010, a micro-expansion named Children of Neinzul was released, with the sole intention of donating all profits from game sales to Child's Play, a charity for sick children. Another full expansion was released on January 28, 2011, titled Light of the Spire, which added new content and game modes. On October 19, 2012, AI War 6.0 was released along with the Ancient Shadows expansion. A sequel, AI War 2, was released to early access on Steam on October 15, 2018. The official release was on October 22, 2019.

== Gameplay ==
AI War pits human players against AI opponents that control vastly superior fleets at the start of the game. The main goal is to destroy the two opposing AI's home command stations without losing yours (in multiplayer the humans will not lose until all human home command stations have been lost). As with chess, AI War is generally thought of in the three stages of opening, middlegame, and endgame, all of which involve different player and AI interactions and activities.

Maps vary in size from 10 to 120 systems and map size has a significant impact on the play style of the game as well as time required. The game starts out with the human player(s) each controlling one system (though they may choose to start with more) and the AI controlling the rest of the map. The AI operates using something called AI Progress. This mechanic works as an indicator of how aware the AI is of the leftover human remnants in the galaxy (as well as to balance the fact that if the AI simply attacked the player with everything it had at the start of the game it would win every time). As players complete objectives and capture systems, this value goes up, increasing the volume of reinforcements and attack forces the AI gets to use. There are a few mechanics such as Data Centers and the newly introduced AI Superterminals that lower the AI Progress. One of the primary factors when considering whether to take a planet is the AI progress; taking planets raises it and taking too many will cause the player to be overrun.

AI War supports dynamic cooperation where up to eight players can play together and drop in and out of the game at any time. One effect of this is a group game between friends does not require everybody to be around for each game session, nor does the lobby have to be remade to continue playing if another shows up. As of 3.0, players who join mid-game are given a special colony ship that allows them to start playing without leaning on the other players to gift them systems/units as much.

AI War uses strong disincentives to micromanage units in order to help players manage such a large empire without getting bogged down in details, being more important to choose planets wisely and balance forces than to control said forces exact behavior. AI War instead chooses to be more of a grand strategy game, putting more focus into critical thinking and proper decision making than into "clicking fast".

=== Emergent AI ===
In a quote from the developer, Chris Park, "'There are a ton of RTS games out there that are fun to play...The key weakness that they almost all share, in my opinion, is AI that falls apart in advanced play." AI War is developed using "Emergent AI", which differs from standard game AI in that it doesn't follow "decision trees", or in other words, the AI does not have an easily predictable pattern that can be exploited as in most games. Instead, the AI makes decisions on an individual unit level, a concept the developer coins as "Decentralized Intelligence".

Some other key factors that make the AI War "Emergent AI" unique are:

- Strategic Tiers – The 3 levels of 'thinking' in AI War: Strategic, sub-level, and individual unit. The critical decisions made by the Emergent AI are based on a combination of these 3 factors.
- Sub-Commanders – The way the individual AI units work together on a group level, in which they will "Do what's best for themselves, but also take into account what the group is doing." The developer compares this design principle to flocking behavior in the animal kingdom. He also points out that because of this design mechanic, the AI is "fairly untrickable", meaning they won't often fall victim to the same tactic.
- Fuzzy Logic – This mechanic is designed to prevent players from "knowing" based on standard logic what the AI will do. The general concept of this design strategy is to prevent the AI from being predictable by programming them to not always make the "best" choice, but instead choosing from a larger selection of possibly sub-optimal choices, to prevent the player from being able to easily understand and therefore counter them.
- Intelligent Mistakes – The intentional programming of the AI to make "mistakes" on lower difficulties, to make the game easier for the player. Since the AI at its full operating capacity is reportedly an extremely tough opponent to face, the developer designs the AI to be less of a challenge on easier settings.
- Asymmetrical AI – A design which simplifies the AI reinforcement/attacking process by simply giving them reinforcements of units they need in important locations (on a timer), rather than over-complicating the design with the build process that humans use.

== Expansions ==
=== The Zenith Remnant ===
The Zenith Remnant is AI War's first expansion, and focuses both on adding capturable units and a new minor faction called the Zenith to the game. Arcen maintains an exhaustive list of features, but highlight features are as follows:

- Golems, which have many similar properties to Supreme Commander's "Experimentals".
- Several new base ship types, further expanding on the available choices for the player as well as making the AI a more devious opponent.
- New AI types that took advantage of many of the capturables introduced, as well as some that use Zenith ships.
- Over 40 minutes of new music tracks composed by Arcen Games' composer, Pablo Vega.
- A new class of "Experimental" ships that offer abilities one would not ordinarily find in AI war ships.

=== Children of Neinzul ===
Children of Neinzul (or CoN) is a micro-expansion for AI War, from which all proceeds from are donated to Child's Play, a charity organization for sick children. As of early 2011, over fifteen thousand dollars had been raised and donated. The Children of Neinzul expansion adds new features to the game, including:

- 36 New Ships
- 6 New AI Special Weapons
- 6 New AI types
- 4 New Music Tracks
- 2 New Map Modes

=== Light of the Spire ===
Light of the Spire (or LotS) is the second 'full' expansion of AI War, and added new content as well as new campaign types and additional music. The expansion was released January 28, 2011. The game is said to add:

- 100+ new ships, including new "spirecraft" ships (larger than starships, smaller than golems).
- 2 new campaign types: Defender and Construction.
- A new Fallen Spire minor faction.
- New in-game music tracks.

=== Ancient Shadows ===
Ancient Shadows (or AS), the fourth expansion for AI War, the expansion was released on October 19, 2012, along with the version 6.0 of the game. The expansion features:

- A whole new kind of human player. It's now possible to control champions alongside the main fleet, or to have another player control just one single massive ship.
- Several new sub-races dwelling in the backwater parts of the galaxy for your champions to interact with.
- Modular fortresses.
- 9 new bonus ship classes.
- 3 core AI guard posts and one new minor faction.
- 2 new AI types.
- 2 new map types.
- 98 minutes of new music by Pablo Vega.

=== Vengeance of the Machine ===
Vengeance of the Machine (or VotM), the fifth expansion for AI War, the expansion was released on June 18, 2013, along with the version 7.0 of the game. The expansion features:

- 8 new AI Types
- 2 new map types.
- 6 new bonus ship classes.
- 2 new optional AI Plots.
- 5 new Core Guard Posts to defend the AI homeworlds.
- 7 new Guardian types.
- 28 new achievements.
- More music from Pablo Vega.

=== Destroyer of Worlds ===
Destroyer of Worlds (or DoW), the sixth expansion for AI War, that was released on August 18, 2014, along with the version 8.0 of the game.

Amongst new features:

- Hacking mechanics
- Salvage mechanics
- New ways to improve Champions
- Updates to AI
- Linux support.

== Reception ==
Reception

Aggregate score
| Aggregator | Score |
|---|---|
| Metacritic | 80/100 |

Review scores
| Publication | Score |
|---|---|
| Eurogamer | 8/10 |
| PC Gamer (UK) | 86/100 |

AI War received generally favorable reviews and achieved an overall score of 80 on Metacritic. Some reviewers have criticized AI War for being too complex with too steep a learning curve, which contributed to it not being nominated for a 2009 Independent Games Festival award.

AI War's more positive reviews said "AI War is a revolution in terms of how RTSs play," "[The first three AI War Expansions] are perfect examples of what an expansion should be," and "AI War breaks most of the genre's rules. Which is precisely why it's incredible." These same reviewers also noted "it's got a considerable learning curve," "The one thing [the first three expansions] have in common, however, is how much the[y] increase the difficulty compared to the original game," and "It has the presentation of a spreadsheet, but as much heart and soul as Dune 2, Total Annihilation, Homeworld, Galactic Civilizations and Desktop Tower Defense rolled into one."

A general theme throughout professional third-party reviews of the game, many of which have been indexed on the developer's site, has been that the graphics are seriously underwhelming, the gameplay is novel, and that the difficulty is high compared to even other hardcore strategy titles.

== Legacy ==
=== AI War 2 ===
In 2016, the sequel to AI War: Fleet Command, AI War 2, was funded through a Kickstarter campaign. The story and themes are similar to the original in that the player starts on a single planet and must defeat a powerful Artificial Intelligence that has taken over a galaxy. The player must make thoughtful decisions on what planets to capture so as to not raise the AI Points faster than they themselves grow in ability to defend their assets. The game can be played single-player or with online cooperative multiplayer.

In contrast the to AI War: Fleet Command, in AI War 2, ships belong to ship lines which are assigned to fleets. Lines of ships can be added by stealing from the AI using hacking points or by capturing planets with fleet carriers containing ship lines. A ship line holds a certain number of ships that can be increased by upgrading technology by spending science points. As ships are destroyed in combat, they are automatically replaced so long as the fleet is near a factory, player has enough resources, and the transport vessel has not taken so much damage that it became disabled. The ships in a fleet can be loaded in to the transport vessel to quickly transport ships across the map.

AI War 2 was released to early access on Steam on October 15, 2018. The full release for Windows, Linux and mac OS X was launched on October 22, 2019. AI War 2 had three expansions: The Spire Rises, released on February 27, 2020, Zenith Onslaught released on May 18, 2021, and Neinzul Abyss released on April 22, 2022. The Neinzul Abyss expansion added the Necromancer faction. This is a playable faction as an alternative to the default human faction.

AI War 2 received a score of 75 on Metacritic. It has been praised for automating some of the busywork from the previous game with the introduction of the fleet system. The barrier to entry has been described as lower than the previous game.
