= Starward Rogue =

2016 video game

- Developer: Arcen Games
- Publishers: Arcen Games (2016); Klabater (2024)
- Engine: Unity
- Platforms: Microsoft Windows; MacOS; Linux; Nintendo Switch; PlayStation 4 PlayStation 5 Xbox One; Xbox Series X and Series S
- Release: Microsoft Windows, MacOS, Linux; January 22, 2016; Nintendo Switch, PlayStation 4, PlayStation 5, Xbox One, Xbox Series X and Series S January 25, 2024
- Genre: Roguelike / Bullet hell

Starward Rogue is a bullet hell roguelike video game from Arcen Games. The game takes place in the same universe as many of Arcen's other games, such as AI War and Stars Beyond Reach. The player controls a mech housing a severed head of an alien hydra (the main character "Hydral" from The Last Federation), shooting through the levels of a procedurally generated prison tower lodged in the surface of a star.

The game was well-received by critics and fans, being favorably compared to games like Binding of Isaac. However the positive reaction did not translate into sales, and the game's poor financial performance shortly after launch was partially responsible for Arcen laying off the majority of its staff. On January 24, 2018, the AuGMENTED expansion pack was released for the game, which added new items, enemies and rooms.

On January 25, 2024, Starward Rogue was released on various consoles under Polish publisher Klabater.

== Reception ==
Reviewing the game for Hardcore Gamer, James Cunningham concluded: "Starward Rogue is easily the best arcade roguelike since Binding of Isaac: Rebirth and while it doesn't stray too far from its inspiration's influence, it makes up for this by executing its formula incredibly well."
