= Subatomic Studios =

Independent video game developer

- Industry: Video games
- Founded: 2008
- Headquarters: Cambridge, United States
- Key people: Jamie Gotch, CEO; Sergei Gourski, CFO; Leo Montenegro, CCO
- Products: Fieldrunners; Tinkerbox; Fieldrunners 2 Fieldrunners Attack
- Number of employees: 18

Subatomic Studios is an independent video game developer with offices in Cambridge, Massachusetts in the United States. It is best known for developing the tower defense game Fieldrunners series.

== History ==
Subatomic Studios was founded in 2008 by industry veterans Jamie Gotch, Leonardo Montenegro and Sergei Gourski.

== Games ==
- Fieldrunners
- Tinkerbox
- Fieldrunners 2
- Fieldrunners Attack
