= Limbic Software =

Mobile game development company

Limbic Software, Inc.
- Company type: Private
- Industry: Video games
- Founded: February 2, 2009; 17 years ago
- Founders: Arash Keshmirian; Iman Mostafavi; Volker Schönefeld
- Headquarters: Palo Alto, California, U.S.
- Products: TowerMadness series
- Website: limbic.com

Limbic Software, Inc. is an independent mobile game development company founded in 2009 by Arash Keshmirian, Iman Mostafavi, and Volker Schönefeld. Limbic has designed and developed iOS and Android titles TowerMadness, Grinchmas!, Nuts!, Zombie Gunship, TowerMadness 2, and Zombie Gunship Arcade, with over 25 million game downloads worldwide.

Limbic's debut title, TowerMadness, launched in 2009, and in summer 2011, Limbic released two new titles, Nuts! and Zombie Gunship. Following up with their debut title, they released the sequel TowerMadness 2 in the beginning of 2014. After initially announcing a new title as an April Fools' Day joke, Limbic released Zombie Gunship Arcade shortly after in May 2014. The company's mantra is to create the best mobile gaming experience.

== Games developed ==
=== TowerMadness ===
TowerMadness was released on May 23, 2009, for iOS. The mobile game is an open map tower defense game with a zoomable 3D camera. The objective is to defend a base filled with a flock of sheep from waves of aliens by destroying them with diverse weapons in the form of towers. UFOs drop invading aliens on landing pads and the waves of enemies make their way to the base to abduct the sheep. The goal of each alien is to abduct one sheep. The player can destroy the aliens by building towers. Each enemy destroyed provides the player with more in-app coins to obtain new towers and upgrade existing towers for more damage output. Once all waves of enemies are destroyed or all sheep have been abducted, the game ends. On December 5, 2013, an Android version of TowerMadness launched on the Google Play Store.

Three versions of TowerMadness exist: TowerMadness, released on May 23, 2009; TowerMadness Zero, the ad-enabled version, released on October 25, 2009; and TowerMadness HD, the version enhanced for the iPad that exclusively includes split-screen multiplayer mode, released on May 23, 2010.

=== Grinchmas! ===
Grinchmas! was released on November 25, 2009, designed and developed by Limbic as the first iOS game for the Dr. Seuss Enterprises brand and published by Oceanhouse Media. The mobile game includes two gameplay modes: “Mean Grinch” and “Merry Grinch”. As “Mean Grinch”, the player swipes the screen to throw snowballs and target the Whos Houses down in Who-ville in order to silence the Christmas noise. As “Merry Grinch”, the player swipes the screen to throw colored presents to the matching colored Whos Houses.

=== Nuts! ===
Nuts! was released on May 24, 2011. The mobile game is an endless climbing game, where the player helps Jake, the squirrel, run up a tree while dodging tree branches, finding power-ups, and collecting coins by the player tilting their device. The player can complete over 40 challenges, including collecting scattered picnic basket items that a crow snatched from Jake and his friend Miranda in the beginning story of the game. On July 16, Limbic released Nuts! on Google Play for Android devices.

=== Zombie Gunship ===
Zombie Gunship was released on July 21, 2011. The mobile game is a first-person shooter with a 3D night vision display, where the player fires from a heavily armed AC-130 ground attack aircraft. The objective is to target and destroy endless waves of zombies and protect human survivors as they make their way to the safe bunker. The player can choose to use a 25mm Gatling gun, 40mm Bofors auto-cannon, and a 105mm Howitzer cannon, all of which all can be upgraded to enhance damage radius, faster cooling time, faster reload, faster firing rate, and bullet speed. The player can complete objectives, earn ranks and collect coins for each zombie killed and human saved to use for upgrades or bypassing objectives. The game ends once a zombie has breached the bunker or when the player kills three or more humans. On September 19, 2013, an Android version of Zombie Gunship launched on the Google Play Store, and on October 8, 2013, the app was released on Amazon.

The iOS version of Zombie Gunship supports Apple's AirPlay which allows the game to be played on any television connected to an Apple TV.

=== TowerMadness 2 ===
TowerMadness 2 was released on January 23, 2014, for both iOS and Android, and is the sequel to the original TowerMadness. The mobile game is an open map tower defense game with a zoomable 3D camera. The objective is to defend a base filled with a flock of sheep from waves of aliens by destroying them with diverse weapons in the form of towers. UFOs drop invading aliens on landing pads and the waves of enemies make their way to the base to abduct the sheep. The goal of each alien is to abduct one sheep. The player can destroy the aliens by building towers. Each enemy destroyed provides the player with more in-app coins to obtain new towers and upgrade existing towers for more damage output. Once all waves of enemies are destroyed or all sheep have been abducted, the game ends. This sequel features updated graphics, all new maps, new and improved weapons, new characters, including Bo and Xen, and new enemies.

=== Zombie Gunship Arcade ===
Zombie Gunship Arcade was released on May 1, 2014, for iOS. The game was initially announced as an April Fools' Day joke but was developed soon after receiving an overwhelming number of positive feedback via Facebook and Twitter. The mobile game takes the core idea of Zombie Gunship by shooting zombies from an AC-130. The game is presented in a classic arcade mode with sideview gameplay. The player is to tap the Gunship in order to fly up, shoot zombies and dodge humans.

=== Zombie Gunship Survival ===
Zombie Gunship Survival was officially released on May 24, 2017. for iOS and Android devices. Survive a zombie apocalypse and protect the human race from an AC-130 gunship. The game play involves leading groups of military survivors on scavenging missions. While the troops loot resources, the player shoots the zombies from the sky to protect them. One of the features of the game is base building for defense against wave style zombie assaults.

=== Zombie Gunship Revenant ===
Zombie Gunship Revenant is an augmented reality game developed by Limbic Software for iOS 11, released on September 19, 2017. The gameplay follows the theme of the previous Zombie Gunship titles, where the player controls a helicopter gunship to shoot zombies from the sky. The flight is controlled by player movements looking over a base projected with thermal camera graphics. The helicopter can be equipped with gatling guns, cannons, rockets, missiles and the sniper pod similar to the other weapons in the Zombie Gunship franchise.
