= Eden Rising: Supremacy =

2018 video game

- Developer(s): Nvizzio Creations, Meridian4
- Publisher(s): The Wall Productions Inc
- Engine: Unity
- Platform(s): Microsoft Windows
- Release: May 17, 2018
- Genre(s): Tower defense
- Mode(s): multiplayer, single-player

Eden Rising: Supremacy is a cooperative open world-tower defense video game developed by Canadian studios Nvizzio Creations and Meridian4. The game was released in Early Access via Steam for Microsoft Windows on May 17, 2018 with a full game release planned towards the end of 2018.

== Gameplay ==
Eden Rising:Supremacy is a variant of a tower defense game; players are human explorers who are stranded on the alien world of Eden. Dying from the poisonous alien atmosphere, players are saved by an entity known as The Steward. In return for their lives and new powers, they are asked to defend and restore each of the ancient Crucibles located in the world from sieges of hostile monsters. Monsters attack from one or more lanes leading to the Crucible and make their way towards the center. If the Crucible is destroyed, the siege is failed and players must start the siege over. Sieges escalate in difficulty as more are successfully completed and reward players with upgrades, increased power used to place more defenses, and new technologies for crafting.

In order to prepare for sieges, players have the ability to craft traps, turrets, weapons, and armor. By exploring the different biomes and collecting materials in the open world of Eden, players can discover additional crafting technologies. The world is populated with hostile monsters and environmental hazards. Traps and turrets can be used to fight enemies in both sieges and in the open world, with many encounters requiring strategy and teamwork to overcome.

== Development ==
Eden Rising: Supremacy was revealed on March 18 and is slated for a May 2018 release into Early Access. Since its announcement several videos have been released showcasing gameplay, as well as development blogs detailing the game's distinct visual style. In its current state, the game supports 1-8 players on a server. There are 4 completed biomes, each containing a Crucible to restore and defend. The game has several weapon families, each with their own animation move-sets and playstyle.

The game will be updated to add more content, including biomes, weapons, and Crucibles, consistently after Early Access launch with a full version release planned for the end of 2018.
