= Fieldrunners 2 =

2012 video game

- App Store icon
- Developer: Subatomic Studios
- Publisher: Subatomic Studios
- Platforms: iOS; Microsoft Windows; Android; BlackBerry 10; PlayStation Vita
- Release: iOS; July 19, 2012; Windows; January 10, 2013; Android; April 24, 2013; BlackBerry 10; August 29, 2013; PlayStation Vita: PAL: December 17, 2014; NA: December 23, 2014
- Genre: Tower defense
- Mode: Single-player

Fieldrunners 2 is a tower defense video game, the sequel to Fieldrunners, developed and published by Subatomic Studios. It was released on July 19, 2012, as an iOS title, specifically designed for the iPhone and iPod Touch. It is the third release from developer Subatomic Studios. A PlayStation Vita version was released in December 2014.

== Gameplay ==
Fieldrunners 2 offers 25 levels with 4 different zones and backgrounds. Players choose at most 6 types of weapon and 3 types of consumptive item at the start of each level. Fieldrunners 2 also offers 3 levels of difficulty for players, which are casual, tough, and heroic modes. Just like any other tower defense game, players then pick a tower and slap it down on the map, wait for enemies to start to falling, and earn more cash to build more towers.

Players lose the game when the amount of escaped enemies reaches 20. If players win, the game will give players 1 star (for casual mode), 2 stars (for tough mode), or 3 stars (for heroic mode). Players can choose to continue playing in the endless mode after passing each level. No matter players pass the level or not, the game will give players a certain amount of coins according to players’ performance. Players can use earned coins and stars to buy more powerful towers. Fieldrunners 2 offers 25 types of weapon, and 5 types of items. Each of them has distinct range, effect, and weakness.

Compared to its predecessor, Fieldrunners 2 has some major improvements. The variety of towers and enemies increases 3 times in Fieldrunners 2. The game supports the iPhone, iPod touch, and iPad systems (including the latest iPhone and iPad with Retina display). One of the larger improvements is the addition of a path marker. In the original game, the unending stream of fieldrunners would follow a very specific path. They'd pretty much march straight until they hit something. In Fieldrunners 2, the tiny soldiers, tanks and motorcycles will stream across the battlefield more realistically, constantly changing their route depending on where players place their towers. They'll no longer walk right into the heart of a flamethrower pit.

=== Maps ===
Most of the 25 levels are traditional tower defense-style affairs, where players frantically build towers to ward off enemy troops. The main maps task players to survive 60 or 70 waves with the limit of 20 escaped enemies, but some maps task players with guarding multiple routes, while other ingeniously let the player actually build mazes of death with their towers. There are Sudden Death levels, where the player must survive an endless parade of bad guys for a certain amount of time, and even puzzle maps that task players with guiding enemies through things like laser barriers on an open field.

== Release ==
Since its first release on iOS on October 1, 2008, Fieldrunners had been ported over to a total of nine platforms for console, PC and mobile gaming. The use of the Steam gaming platform united development efforts on Windows, Mac and Linux PC's. Fieldrunners 2 again launched exclusively to iOS, followed by Windows on January 10, 2013. Subatomic Studios released the game for Android on April 24. The version for BlackBerry 10 followed being released on August 29. It was planned for a PlayStation Vita version release in 2013, but ultimately did not come out until it was released in Europe on December 17, 2014.

== Reception ==
Reception

Aggregate score
| Aggregator | Score |
|---|---|
| Metacritic | (iOS) 88/100 (PC) 73/100 |

Review scores
| Publication | Score |
|---|---|
| 4Players | (iOS) 88% (PC) 80% |
| Gamezebo | (iOS) 100/100 |
| IGN | (iOS) 8.5/10 (PC) 8.1/10 |
| Jeuxvideo.com | (PC) 16/20 |
| MacLife | (iOS) 4/5 |
| PC Gamer (UK) | (PC) 83% |
| Pocket Gamer | (iOS) 4/5 |
| Polygon | (iOS) 8.5/10 |
| The Telegraph | (iOS) 4.5/5 |
| TouchArcade | (iOS) 5/5 |
| Digital Spy | (iOS) 4/5 |
| Metro | (iOS) 7/10 |

Fieldrunners 2 received "generally favorable reviews" for iOS and "mixed or average" reviews for PC, according to the review aggregation website Metacritic.
