= TowerMadness =

2009 video game

- TowerMadness HD app icon
- Developer: Limbic Software
- Publisher: Limbic Software
- Platforms: iOS, Android
- Release: TowerMadness; May 23, 2009; TowerMadness Zero; October 25, 2009; TowerMadness HD; May 23, 2010; TowerMadness Android; December 5, 2013
- Genres: Tower defense, strategy, puzzle
- Modes: Single-player, multiplayer

TowerMadness is a 3D tower defense strategy game for iOS and Android, developed by Limbic Software. Three iOS versions of TowerMadness exist: TowerMadness, the original version released on May 23, 2009; TowerMadness Zero, the ad-enabled version released on October 25, 2009; and TowerMadness HD, the version enhanced for iPad that includes split-screen multiplayer mode released on May 23, 2010. The Android version of TowerMadness launched for Google Play on December 5, 2013. On January 23, 2014, Limbic released the sequel to TowerMadness, TowerMadness 2.

== Gameplay ==
The objective in TowerMadness is to defend a base filled with a flock of sheep from waves of aliens by destroying the aliens with diverse weapons in the form of towers. UFOs drop invading aliens on landing pads and the waves of enemies make their way to the base to abduct the sheep. Each wave arrives in 20 second intervals, or all waves of aliens can be sent in at once. The goal of each alien is to abduct one sheep. The player destroys the aliens by building towers. Each enemy destroyed provides the player with more in-game coins to obtain new towers and upgrade existing towers. Once all waves of enemies are destroyed or all sheep have been abducted, the game ends.

There are two game modes: Normal and Endless, in which both contain maps with easy, medium, hard, or madness difficulties to choose from. In Normal mode, there is a set number of enemy waves and a set amount of coins to win. In Endless mode, the waves of enemies are endless. This mode also includes a Sandbox option, which starts off the player with 10,000 coins and a speed boost of adding and upgrading towers before sending the endless waves of aliens.

== Reception ==
TowerMadness received generally positive reviews. In August 2009, Wired described the game as “addictive, time-sucking fun”. TowerMadness HD was the winner of the 2011 Pocket Gamer Readers’ Choice iPad Game of the Year.
