= Flash Element TD =

2007 video game

- Developer: David Scott
- Designer: David Scott
- Platform: Adobe Flash
- Release: January 12, 2007
- Genre: Tower defense
- Mode: Single-player

Screenshot of usual gameplay

Flash Element TD is a Flash-based tower defense browser game created by American developer David Scott and launched in January 2007. The game had been played over 140 million times as of March 2009.

== Development ==
David Scott got the inspiration for Flash Element TD in 2006. He noticed that no one had created a Tower Defense game using Macromedia Flash and only started work on Flash Element TD as a technical exercise to see if it was possible. The map and name is based on the "Element TD" map created for the real-time strategy game Warcraft III by Brian Powers and Evan Hatampour, David Scott created a much simpler version of the map that could be played using only a browser. The game was launched in January 2007 and still has growth to this day.

Originally, the game was promoted through the web service StumbleUpon. It eventually found its way onto several Flash game sites, four years later can be found on 25,950 sites and has had over 183 million views.

Next similar game of David Scott: Vector TDx.

=== Updates ===
The original release version of the game, version 1.0 was released on January 12, 2007. New versions were uploaded daily, with the final version released on January 22. Flash Element TD has not been updated since and still increases in popularity some two years on. In December 2007, Scott and Paul Preece also created the Casual Collective, whose flagship game was a multiplayer version of Desktop Tower Defense. On January 12, 2008, one year after its release, version 2 was released.

== Reception ==
Flash Element TD was played by nearly 500,000 users within the first few hours after launch. It was eventually embedded on nearly 12,000 different websites, and downloaded more than 140 million times by the end of 2008.
