= Trenches 2 =

2011 video game

- Developer: Thunder Game Works
- Publisher: EA Games
- Platforms: iPhone, iPod Touch, iPad
- Release: NA: December 15, 2011
- Modes: Campaign, Skirmish, Multiplayer

Trenches 2 is the sequel to Trenches. It was developed by American studio Thunder Game Works.

== Gameplay ==
Trenches 2, like Trenches, is a combination of Tower Defence and Castle Attack genres, the player must create soldiers in order to overwhelm the opposing force. It is largely based on attrition warfare like World War I was. Unlike Trenches, the game has five countries each with their own strengths and weaknesses: France, Germany, Russia, Britain and the USA. The campaign is non-linear as the player can choose what area they would like to attack on a map of Europe.

== Reception ==
The game was very well received on Apple's App Store, boasting a 4 1/2 out of 5 stars. On other review websites, the game was given poor reviews.

== Publishing ==
The game uses EA's Origin. EA’s distribution agreement with the game’s developer had previously expired, but as of February 28, 2013, Trenches 2 was re-released on the iTunes app store for free.
