= Zombie Gunship =

2011 video game

- Zombie Gunship app icon.
- Developers: Limbic Software; Hidden Elephant
- Publisher: Limbic Software
- Platforms: iOS, Android
- Release: July 21, 2011
- Genres: Arcade; Action; FPS
- Mode: Single-player

Zombie Gunship is a first-person shooter mobile game with a 3D thermal imaging display, where the player is a gunner who fires at zombies from a heavily armed AC-130 ground attack aircraft circling various user-selected maps. The mobile game was developed by Limbic Software and released July 21, 2011 for Apple’s iOS, September 19, 2013 for Android on the Google Play Store, and October 8, 2013 on Amazon.

== Gameplay ==
The objective in Zombie Gunship is to engage escalating waves of zombies with the AC-130's weapons systems before they breach the bunker, while simultaneously protecting civilians trying to reach it. To do that, Zombie Gunship provides three upgradable weapons: a 25mm Gatling gun, a 40mm Bofors auto-cannon, and a 105mm Howitzer cannon. Weapons can be upgraded for increased rates of fire, projectile velocity, area of effect and reload/cooldown speed.

The player can complete objectives to earn military ranks (which adds a reward multiplier all future missions) and collect coins for various purposes. An individual game ends either when a zombie reaches the bunker or if the player kills too many civilians. Each zombie awards 20 coins (up to 30 after fully upgrading Zombie Bounty) when killed, and each rescued civilian is worth 100. There are no coin penalties for civilian casualties. Coins are primarily used for upgrades or to skip objectives.

During game play the player can toggle night vision between white and black hot modes, which affects the coloration of civilians and zombies. In WHOT, zombies are black and civilians are white, while the reverse applies in BHOT.

H.S.A.S (Human Sequestration Advisory System), the game's bonus mode, prohibits civilians from appearing in the next game. It activates either through an expensive purchase or through saving a total of 75 humans across any number of games.

The iOS version of Zombie Gunship includes Apple’s AirPlay support which allows the game to be played on a television connected to an Apple TV.

=== Enemies ===
There are only two types of zombies, both of which can attack and kill civilians. The smaller zombies appear humanoid, are fragile and shamble quickly, whereas the larger ones crawl slowly, are less common but also highly resilient.

=== Maps ===
Four maps exist, each with one safe bunker. Bunker Charlie 1 is a simple terrain containing hills, Bakersfield is an industrial power station with a train running through it every few minutes, Pleasant Acres is a housing tract, and The Lockdown is a large prison complex surrounded by several walls.

== Reception ==
Zombie Gunship received generally positive reviews. In July 2011, IGN Editor’s Choice rated the game a 9/10, claiming it as “a very tough game to put down.” In August 2011, Macworld App Gem rated the game a 4.5/5 describing that “All of these elements—the strategy, the graphics and sound, and yes, the undeniable thrill of sending the undead back to the grave they crawled out of—make for a compelling iOS game.” At the time of launch for Android in September 2013, Android Central declared Zombie Gunship to be "a ton of fun", MythBusters Jaime & Adam's site Tested.com praised that the game "takes a different route to realism, and it works well", and Droid Life insisted that "If you have spent anytime playing Call of Duty, and love getting into the seat of an AC-130, then you will feel right at home with this game."
