= TowerMadness 2 =

2014 video game

- TowerMadness 2 app icon
- Developer: Limbic Software
- Publisher: Limbic Software
- Platforms: iOS, Android, OS X
- Release: January 23, 2014
- Genres: Tower defense, strategy, puzzle
- Mode: Single-player

TowerMadness 2 is a 3D tower defense strategy game, sequel to TowerMadness, for iOS and Android, developed by Limbic Software and released on January 23, 2014. TowerMadness 2 has game controller support.

== Gameplay ==
The objective in TowerMadness 2 is to defend a base filled with a flock of sheep from waves of aliens by destroying the aliens with diverse weapons in the form of towers. UFOs drop invading aliens on landing pads and the waves of enemies make their way to the base to abduct the sheep. Each wave arrives in intervals, or all waves can be sent at once if Invasion Mode is enabled. The goal of each alien is to abduct one sheep. The player destroys the aliens by building towers. Each enemy destroyed provides the player with more in-game coins to build new towers and upgrade existing towers. Once all waves of enemies are destroyed or all sheep have been abducted, the game ends and you earn a certain number of stars and wool.

Stars rate how well a player did on each map based on how many sheep were saved, with the highest being four stars for completing a map with no sheep lost and with Invasion Mode enabled. Without Invasion Mode enabled, the highest possible stars earned are three.

Wool, the in-game currency, is rewarded for completing or failing each map. This can be used to unlock additional towers and tower levels in Xen’s Laboratory, the in-game shop.

There are four game modes: Normal, Endless, Invasion, and Classic. In Normal Mode, there is a set number of enemy waves to destroy and UFOs arrive in intervals. In Endless Mode, there are an endless number of waves to defeat. A player's score is determined by the number of waves survived. In Invasion Mode, all UFOs are sent as quickly as possible, and the rounds have a bonus of +25% wool. If a player can win without losing any sheep, four stars are rewarded. In Classic Mode, all maps and towers are unlocked.

== Reception ==
TowerMadness 2 received generally positive reviews. Upon release, Appsgoer proclaims "you will be rewarded with an addictive, occasionally challenging strategy-demanding game." Android Central mentions "Beyond just the gameplay, this developer is doing all of the right things." Pocket Gamer, explains that "The game also balances its cheeky humour well with stages that will seriously challenge your forward-planning abilities." TouchArcade praises it as "an excellent tower defense game and expands upon the original in every fact".
