= Norn9 =

2013 otome game

- The limited edition of Norn9 featuring the male protagonists.

NORN9 ノルン+ノネット (NORN9 Norun+Nonetto)
- Video game
- Developer: Otomate
- Publisher: Idea Factory
- Genre: Otome game
- Platform: PlayStation Portable, iOS, Android, Nintendo Switch
- Released: PlayStation Portable: JP: May 30, 2013; iOS: JP: October 1, 2015; Android: JP: October 01, 2015; Nintendo Switch: JP: September 27, 2018
- Video game

Norn9: Var Commons
- Developer: Otomate
- Publisher: JP: Idea Factory; NA: Aksys Games; EU: Aksys Games
- Genre: Otome game
- Platform: PlayStation Vita, Nintendo Switch
- Released: PlayStation Vita: JP: December 11, 2014; NA: November 3, 2015; EU: November 4, 2015; Nintendo Switch: JP: September 27, 2018; NA: March 30, 2023
- Video game

Norn9: Last Era
- Developer: Otomate
- Publisher: Idea Factory
- Genre: Otome game
- Platform: PlayStation Vita, iOS, Android, Nintendo Switch
- Released: PlayStation Vita: JP: April 2, 2015; iOS: JP: May 19, 2022; Android: JP: May 19, 2022; Nintendo Switch: JP: September 27, 2018; NA: August 31, 2023
- Anime television series
- Directed by: Takao Abo
- Produced by: Asuka Yamazaki; Hirotaka Kaneko; Kazuhiro Kanemitsu; Mitsutoshi Ogura; Satoshi Fukao; Shigeki Hosoda; Takashi Iwasaki; Takema Okamura; Yoshiyasu Hayashi; Katsumi Kikumasa; Tomohiko Shigenaga; Ran Nomura; Jun Nishimura (Opening theme) (Note: Credited as オープニングテーマ制作担当プロデューサー (Producer in Charge of Opening Theme))
- Written by: Natsuko Takahashi
- Music by: Kevin Penkin
- Studio: Kinema Citrus; Orange
- Licensed by: AUS: Madman; NA: Sentai Filmworks; UK: MVM Entertainment
- Original network: AT-X, Tokyo MX, BS11, Sun TV
- English network: SEA: ANIPLUS HD
- Original run: January 7, 2016 – March 31, 2016
- Episodes: 12 + Special
- Video game

Norn9: Act Tune
- Developer: Otomate
- Publisher: Idea Factory
- Genre: Otome game
- Platform: PlayStation Vita
- Released: 2016

Norn9 is a 2013 otome game for PlayStation Portable. It was developed by Otomate and published by Idea Factory. A PlayStation Vita port, entitled Norn9: Var Commons, was released on December 11, 2014. A fan disc titled Norn9: Last Era was released on April 2, 2015. A combined version of Var Commons and Last Era, titled Norn9 LOFN, was released on the Nintendo Switch on September 27, 2018. English versions of Var Commons and Last Era were released on the Switch on March 30, 2023, and September 31, 2023, respectively. On March 2, 2014, it was announced that an anime adaptation was in the works. The anime ran from January 7 to March 31, 2016.

== Plot ==
Guided by a strange, haunting song, elementary-schooler Sorata Suzuhara from the Heisei Era is warped back in time to 1919, in a high-tech ship called Norn9. This ship, flying above towns resembling that of the Meiji or Taishō period, harbours The Gifted, a group of three girls and eight boys with special abilities. As he tries to find a way to return to his time, he discovers incredible secrets about the world and spacetime itself.

== Media ==
=== Anime ===
On March 2, 2014, Idea Factory announced that Norn9: Norn + Nonette has an anime in the works during the "Norn9 with Ark & for Spica" event at Tokyo's Nakano Sun Plaza. The anime aired from January 7 to March 31, 2016. The opening theme is "Kazakiri" by Nagi Yanagi and the ending theme is "Zero Tokei" by Kaori Oda. On December 29, 2015, the anime was licensed by Sentai Filmworks in North America.

The series was streamed on Hulu and Anime Network.

==== Episode list ====
No.	Official English title (Note: All English titles are taken from Sentai Filmworks.) Original Japanese title	Original release date
1	"The Ship that Sails in the Sky" "Sora o seiku fune" (空を征く船)	January 7, 2016
It is 1919. A teenage girl arrives on the sailing ship Norn9, where teenagers with special abilities gather. As of date, there are 2 girls (excluding her) named Mikoto Kuga and Nanami Shiranui, as well as 8 other boys Kakeru Yuiga, Senri Ichinose, Masamune Tōya, Sakuya Nijō, Itsuki Kagami, Akito Shukuri, Ron Muroboshi, and Heishi Otomaru. Part of an organisation called The World, their powers are employed for peacekeeping and management throughout the Earth, with its origins and science easily exceeding that on the land. Having forgotten her name, she engages in various duties to be self-sufficient, mostly accompanied by Kakeru. With his ability to manipulate greens, they take care of a peach tree orchard together, growing closer. However, she falls from a tree while trying to pick a ripe peach. Saved by Kakeru, she lands in the water and remembers her name: Koharu.
2	"Ability" "Nōryoku" (能力)	January 14, 2016
An unknown aircraft arrives and attacks the ship. Although it is protected by Mikoto's force fields, something in the interior breaks the barrier and allow two perpetrators to enter. Kakeru and Masamune, who were farming with Koharu, leave her in the safety of her room before departing to investigate but she leaves right after noticing the potential threats to the peach trees. Meanwhile, Mikoto is confronted by Natsuhiko Azuma, the leader of the pair of intruders, who wields a strange type of gun. After disappearing, they attempt to shoot and destroy the ship's center, aiming directly at the peach orchard where Koharu is. Using her ability, she deflects the ray and burns down the entire orchard in the process with her fire manipulation skills. The unknown aircraft retreats, and Kakeru find her again, but she doesn't tell them of what she has done out of guilt, intending to replant the peach trees again. Keeping the last seed remaining from her power rampage, she comes across a young boy warped back in time after being on a field trip in 2016.
3	"Sprouting Spring" "Mebuku haru" (芽吹く春)	January 21, 2016
The young boy, Sorata Suzuhara, gets warped back in time after hearing a strange song in his field trip at the museum. As a studious and resourceful boy, he attempts to find his way back. He finds a mysterious spirit-like girl but she disappears, and for some reason feels particularly nostalgic to him and is a presence unknown to the others. Meanwhile, the teenagers hold a meeting after noticing some strange happenings during the confrontation. Mikoto's barrier was broken despite her mental conditions and health being at peak levels, and there was no debris inside from the oncoming aircraft outside, meaning there had to be a traitor amongst them. Kakeru proposes a pair system where each person can keep watch over their own partner, pairing up with Koharu. Everyone else departs to carry out post-battle investigations and cleaning up. Mikoto and her partner Sakuya head to the library to conduct research, where she remembers their promise as childhood friends to forever love each other, but now that they've grown up she wishes to be more focused on duty. Koharu later finds out how Kakeru was abandoned by his father four years ago, with an ear cuff as the last thing to remember him by.
4	"Serenade of the Dawn" "Kare dare no serenāde" (彼誰のセレナーデ)	January 28, 2016
Paired together, Akito expresses his contempt and dislike of Nanami outrightly, even going as far as to wish that he was the traitor so she could turn him in, be rid of him and get a "nice little pat on the head by The World". This seems very likely as she notices him conversing with a strange man at night that disappears right after. Nanami confronts him, and assures him that they have to be partners to hide the fact that Akito has no special ability. Angry, Akito wishes for Nanami to die, and at that moment she falls off the cliffs but he risks his life to save her. In the end, they are both saved by Kakeru's ability, and punished by a cuff that makes sure they have to stay together at all times, except for brief periods of 30 minutes, within which they don't return to each other's side one of them will be electrocuted. Because of the strain of carrying two people at once Kakeru collapses with a fever and Koharu takes care of him. In the morning, Mikoto and Sakuya go out on land to search for their intruders, and find a flyer about The World promoting the usage of ability-users as war weapons. When evening sets, Kakeru is still sleeping due to being sick. Because of that Nanami and Akito can't have their cuffs removed, and stay together till morning, eventually deciding to break up the pair. When morning arrives and Koharu makes Kakeru some porridge, she finds his ear cuff missing.
5	"The Dozing Forest" "Madoromu mori" (微睡む森)	February 4, 2016
As the girls take a bath together at night, they each reflect on their own troubles, sighing. Itsuki, in the men's bath next door, lets a chick servant pass them a ladder lottery to pick a slip for a little game at night, hoping to cheer them up. The three girls wake up in a thick dark forest surrounded by glowing pumpkins, each wearing strange and different clothes. Koharu has on a European medieval dress with puffed sleeves, Mikoto a white pink ballgown with ribbons, and Nanami a red hooded gown with frills. Itsuki's voice alerts them to being in a dream world of his creation using his abilities, with them as the fairytale princesses Snow White, Cinderella and Little Red Riding Hood respectively. To get out of the dream, each of them must find their important person and a "happily ever after". Each of their tales takes a twist though. In Snow White, Koharu is immediately met by Masamune claiming to be the prince, inviting her to hold their wedding back at the castle at once but she runs away on a whim, coming across first the seven dwarves-chicks and finally Kakeru posing as the poisoned apple. Kakeru hates himself for causing harm to others as a poison, deciding to live along, but Koharu embraces him and they share a kiss. In Cinderella, Itsuki steals Mikoto's shoe and her search for it leads her to Sakuya, the prince. Remembering how he promised to die protecting a girl he loves, she begs him not to die but inevitably sees Itsuki as Sakuya instead. In Little Red Riding Hood, Ron shows up as the hunter and Heishi the granny for Nanami, who runs off trying to find and kill the wolf, whom she encounters is Akito. Two Akitos appear, one embodying the hatred for Nanami and the other the normal, gruff but lovable wolf he is, and after a confrontation the fake one disappears. Returning to reality, the three girls wake up, finally realising their own feelings.
6	"The Gears in Motion" "Ugokihajime ta haguruma" (動き始めた歯車)	February 11, 2016
It turns out everyone had that same dream that night. Akito promises Nanami that although he hates her for taking away a precious memory from him, he doesn't want to kill her. Kakeru and Koharu are embarrassed but continue their friendship, and awkward silence ensues between Mikoto and Sakuya. Masamune further investigates the traitor in their midst after hearing of Kakeru's ear cuff going missing, touching his bed and using his ability to look into the past, seeing the shadowed face of a man. Soon after breakfast, an explosion goes off, but Mikoto's barrier isn't broken so she rushes to catch the traitor, getting knocked out by him. Sakuya, noticing her running off, dashes after her in worry but can't find her. In desperation, he uses his fragile and accidental ability to see the future, and the spirit-like girl grants his wish to use it out of his own free will for once. Although he finds Mikoto in the lodge, he ends up injured and unconscious protecting her. Koharu and Kakeru, arriving just after the traitor dashes off, bring the pair to the house. Masamune contacts The World, who orders them to first find the perpetrator. Ron questions how Sakuya was able to find Mikoto in the place she was captured, and to clear suspicion he shares about his ability, which is not very dependable and can't be controlled. When night falls, Koharu notices Ron holding Kakeru's ear cuff, which he claims to have found in the woods. Although he is unwilling to return it to him, Koharu forcefully takes it from him, ignoring his words that it is dangerous to Kakeru, and returns it. Before she leaves though, she asks Kakeru about Ron's words.
7	"A Dream of Reality" "Utsutsu no Yume" (うつつの夢)	February 18, 2016
Sorata starts to accept living on Norn9 with the teenagers, although he still intends to return home. However, as the explosion had destroyed the water supply and sewage systems, Masamune has been forced to shift it to the ship's central shaft device instead, and make a forced landing just in case. In nine days, they will reach their destinations and separate for good. Heishi resolves to make more memories with his friends, declaring that they will do a dare together. Splitting into groups, Akito, Nanami and himself head to town to first get supplies while Koharu, Kakeru, Senri and Sorata enter an old, collapsed building on the ship. Koharu notices Kakeru isn't wearing the ear cuff, but Kakeru says that's because she's around and it makes him feel safe. Meanwhile, despite her injuries haven't completely healed yet Mikoto sets about making new barriers for the structures around the ship but Sakuya drags her to his room and confronts her about the dream, making Mikoto realise her mistake. At town, Heishi gets lost so Akito and Nanami try to find him. After Akito saves her from some burly men, she recalls how she used her ability to erased his memories of his older brother, someone that he really loved and looked up to a lot. Everyone, completing their preparations, head to the old house to begin their dare, where they have to enter in pairs and make it out. Senri, Koharu's partner for the dare, is scared away by Kakeru dressing up as a monster, and the two share a kiss. Akito admits he likes Nanami, and Mikoto and Sakuya reconcile. On the other hand, Sorata finds the spirit-like girl again in the house, who sings him to sleep. Masamune confronts Ron about being the traitor amongst them as the others, not knowing the truth, begins a search for Sorata, who has been missing throughout the building. Ron tricks Mikoto by luring her with her drawing of the perpetrator and throws her off the building.
8	"The World" "Sekai" (世界)	February 25, 2016
Morning arrives and Heishi desperately tries to contact Mikoto with his telepathy, but to no avail. Luckily, the presence of the barrier proves that she is still alive, and Kakeru finds her scarf tangled in a ladder, allowing Masamune uses his ability. They start a search for her kidnapped location on the mainland. Meanwhile, Mikoto encounters Natsuhiko and his partner Setsu Takishima that attacked the ship previously using an aircraft. Natsuhiko explains of their enemy, Shiro Yuiga, a scientist and weapon dealer that caused numerous wars over the world and wants the year 2056 to arrive. History has repeated itself many times over the course of humanity, and now they are currently living in the fourth history, with Sorata a survivor from the third history. This repeating course of history is due to the Reset, a phenomenon that ability-users can make happen. As wars start to break out all over the world, Koharu gets separated after Kakeru goes down a deserted alleyway to find Ron and meets Shiro, the man who gave her her directions to get on Norn9 and whom she nicknamed "the Traveler". Kakeru is let in on his father Shiro being alive and starts a frantic search for Koharu. He spots her distantly, but, manipulated by Shiro, she sets fire rampant on the city and force all the teenagers to retreat back to the ship. Sorata, stranded inside a hidden compartment of the building, spends time with the spirit-like girl. The chicks translate her messages on screen, revealing her name to be Aine. After Masamune learns of things from The World's messager, the rest of the teenagers find Sorata and descend down into the lower floors of Norn9, where the real Aine dwells: Aion which is what everyone calls The World and can be either a female or a male. The female form, Aine, has appeared to Sorata before while the male one spoke with Akito previously. Awake, Aion reveals itself to be a humanoid weapon designed and created in 2080. In the year 2000, the Earth and all life was exhausted due to repeated wars, but a Fourth World War started anyway in 2060. Finally in 2067, in order to protect the Earth and life on the planet, mankind came up with a plan to initialise the civilisation, known as Reset, which would destroy civilisation and start history over to revert the planet back to its beautiful state. Starting the first Reset in 2085 with Aion utilising the abilities of ability-users, consecutively three more Resets had taken place, making the actual year to be 8075 instead of 1919. Entrusting them with the future, Aion disappears.
9	"The Truth for Everyone" "Sorezore no Shinjitsu" (それぞれの真実)	March 3, 2016
Koharu dreams of Kakeru calling her name as she burns down everything, waking up in the train with Shiro, who reveals that Kakeru is his son and had he stayed with his family Kakeru's life would have been taken. Living with him, Koharu slowly begins to discover that he turned himself into a machine, and wants to return to year 2056. Back at Norn9, Masamune receives word from The World that Shiro was the person who conceived the idea of the Reset in the first place, trying to fast forward history by starting wars to reach the year 2056. With help with a vision of the future from Sakuya in which Mikoto and Koharu are present, Masamune deduces that Koharu is being held on the island where Aion resides. Before they reach, Akito shows his recently discovered ability to manipulate water to Nanami and Senri, with Senri noting that it tastes like the river his father used to let him play in when they were out shopping. Akito reveals that Senri's body couldn't take having a full ability, so Akito took some of it as his brother. After they leave Senri's room, Akito takes all of his brother's powers and requests that Nanami erase Senri's memories of him, because Senri should live in freedom without worry.
9.5	"Recap - Goddess of Destiny" "Sōshūhen Unmei no Megami" (総集編 運命の女神)	March 10, 2016
10	"Aion The Eternity" "Eien" (永遠)	March 17, 2016
Kakeru sets out to look for Koharu upon landing of Norn9 on the island where Aion resides. The rest proceeds to make their decision, awaiting the rest of their friends. Aion informs them that this will be the last Reset as its powers are dying after such a long time. Kakeru finds his father's home base and with help from Natsuhiko, Ron, Setsu and Mikoto, promises to kill his father in return for Koharu's safety. Reuniting with his father for the first time in years, Shiro explains the concept of reincarnation, where a soul is once again born into the world, but what he wants is Haruka, his deceased wife, born as the exact same person again with the same soul in the same environment. Just when he was about to give up, Sorata arrived, with the exact same DNA as the man who created Aine, the base of Aion -- making them out to be the same person. As such, he kidnapped Koharu to delay the Reset, because it can only happen if all the ability-users are present. As they engage in battle, Natsuhiko manages to shut down the entire facility and its protective robots. Setsu activates the explosives to flood the weapons as Kakeru resists against Shiro's brainwashing to turn him into a machine. Akito pushes the water back using his ability and rescues the pair. Together, they head towards the island to initiate the Reset. Shiro embraces his death and longs to be with Haruka again.
11	"The Reset" "Risetto" (リセット)	March 24, 2016
Just as Sakuya comes to rescue Mikoto, Natsuhiko saves her from a robot attack and is gravely injured. As he undergoes recovery, The World informs the ability-users that their decision awaits them tomorrow. If they choose to initiate Reset their powers will be returned to Aion. However, because its powers are deteriorating there might be some side effects, like losing one another and their own memories. Kakeru vows never to forget Koharu. Everyone spends their last day together laughing and sharing sides of their own personality. Instead of next afternoon though, Reset initiates late at night. The teenagers' powers are absorbed into The World's Tower, which sends a burst of powerful energy connecting to Norn9. Travelling around the world, Norn9 gathers the powers from every ability-user to rewrite the world, destroying it completely, and wiping the memories of every human on Earth. Aion lets out its last song before all the forces combine, ravaging the planet. Koharu wakes up in a modernised new, happy and peaceful world, but still keeps the memories of the fifth history, which has been rewritten. As she looks out on the new world, she finds all her friends happy, contented... and strangers, including Kakeru.
12	"The New World" "Atarashī sekai" (新しい世界)	March 31, 2016
Watching a future without Kakeru, Koharu breaks down in tears and rejects the Reset, causing her fire manipulating skills to go out of control. Everyone wakes up from their slumber, thinking the Reset has been initiated, but Masamune finds that it was just a message from Aion to test their decision. As the energy flow from The World's Tower to Norn9 has been reversed, the entire island is falling apart. Heishi telepathically tells Koharu and Kakeru to evacuate as Kakeru claws through the mountains of flames. In the end, Kakeru makes a choice to walk towards the future with her instead of living in one created by other people, and the two share a kiss, breaking the Reset. Sorata vows to stay by Aine's side after learning how she protected him for 200 years in a cold sleep to keep him alive. The ship collapses and the rest of the teenagers fly off in Norn9's extra, tinier capsules, attempting to rescue Koharu and Kakeru as the two free fall through the sky. The pressure of the wind pulls them away, and lastly, Kakeru chooses to let go just as the ship explodes. Aine, choosing free will of love for Sorata, lets him go at the same moment and tells him to live in the "true future". A year and a half passes after the Reset doesn't occur. Everyone is living in peacefully back on land, with Nanami, Akito and Koharu living together in a rented house by the sea. Heishi, now a professional flute player, reunites with Itsuki in a snowy outpost station of Japan where Itsuki sells dreams and they play cards just like how they used to. Now the newly appointed president of The World, Masamune sends a message to the world to try and change the future, hoping to put an end to conflict across the world. Despite having ended war, Mikoto trains daily to master her skills, especially in piloting an aircraft, with the help of Setsu. Sorata is working as a mechanical engineer with Natsuhiko despite his youth. Nanami later reveals that she never erased Senri's memory after all, and he sends his regards as well as a photo with all of them on it. Inspired and cheered up, Koharu uses the opportunity when the tide is at its lowest to visit the crashed and sunken Norn9, where she finds the peach tree she planted healthy and alive, protected by Kakeru's power. She decides to live there and take care of the greenery for him until a mysterious aircraft arrives. Kakeru and Koharu reunite as eternal lovers as the aircraft flies away, driven by Ron.

== Music ==
The game's score was written by Australian composer Kevin Penkin. Famed Final Fantasy composer Nobuo Uematsu wrote the game's main theme, which was arranged by Penkin. Three pieces of theme music are used throughout the game. The opening is melee, the ending theme is many universes, and the insert song is Sunadokei wa Karanokara (砂時計は空の空, The Hourglass is the Futility of Futilities). All three songs are performed by Nagi Yanagi. For Norn9: Last Era, the opening theme is foe while the ending theme is skyscape. Both songs are also performed by Yanagi.
