= Tidalis =

2010 video game

- Developer: Arcen Games
- Engine: Unity
- Platforms: Microsoft Windows, Mac OS, Linux
- Release: WW: July 16, 2010
- Genre: Puzzle

Tidalis is a tile-matching video game developed and published by Arcen Games.

== Reception ==
Reception

Aggregate score
Aggregator	Score
Metacritic	75/100

Review score
Publication	Score
Eurogamer	7/10

Tidalis received mixed to positive reviews from critics upon release. On Metacritic, the game holds a score of 75/100 based on 5 reviews. Kristan Reed of Eurogamer rated the game a 7/10, calling it "a charmingly lo-fi package that positively drowns you in content."
