= Space Run =

2014 tower defense video game

- Official cover art
- Developer: Passtech Games
- Publisher: Focus Home Interactive
- Platforms: Microsoft Windows; OS X; Linux
- Release: Microsoft Windows: WW: June 13, 2014; OS X and Linux: WW: July 1, 2014
- Genre: Tower defense
- Modes: Single-player, multiplayer

Space Run is a tower defense video game developed by PassTech Games and published by Focus Home Interactive. It was released for Microsoft Windows on June 13, 2014, and later released for OS X and Linux. The player assumes the role of a cargo ship pilot, and must build modules and weapons to defend their cargo from attacking ships and other hazards. The game received mixed reviews from critics, and a sequel was announced in March 2016.

== Gameplay ==
The player acts as pilot for a cargo ship, performing space runs for various corporations. The ship is a flat platform made up of hexagonal tiles. The player places weapons and modules on the tiles in order to defend the ship from enemies and hazards. Different structures have varying placement requirements, or may require more than one tile to be placed. For example, most weapons must be placed facing outward into empty space, while some require power to be supplied by an adjacent power source.

Modules and weapons are built using a resource represented by a lug nut. This resource slowly accrues on its own, but destroyed targets drop varying amounts that can be collected by moving the cursor over them. Each corporation provides a different type of cargo, which must be placed or arranged according to its characteristics. One corporation provides simple cargo crates, as well as a mechanic module that can produce more cargo crates during the mission in order to increase the mission reward. Another corporation provides passenger modules, which must face outward, limiting space for weapons.

Each mission has a timed duration that the player must beat, with two tiers of time bonus. The player is rewarded with space credits dependent on the amount of cargo that survived the mission and how quickly they completed it. Reputation, displayed as stars, is rewarded based whether or not the player met cargo or time thresholds. Space credits are used between missions in order to purchase special abilities and bonuses for modules, while gaining reputation unlocks new modules.

== Plot ==
The player plays the role of Buck Mann, a space runner down on his luck. A former military pilot and racer, Buck begins to accept jobs from large corporations when his money runs out. Accompanied by the android, Addam-12, he first accepts a job from the Big Cargo corporation carrying simple cargo containers. Shortly afterwards, the Nuclear Star corporation approaches him to carry nuclear waste. After several runs, Buck Mann attracts the attention of the pirates Brown Beard and Captain Black, who continuously harass him as his missions become more and more lucrative.

== Development ==
Space Run is developed by one-man studio PASSTECH Games, located in Lyon, France. Programmer Sylvain Passot founded the studio in October 2012. Passot has said that Space Run was inspired by Galaxy Trucker, a boardgame by Vlaada Chvatil, as well as accessible games like Plants vs. Zombies.

A sequel named Space Run Galaxy was announced in March 2016. Galaxy will include new boss battles and cargos, as well as new online features.

== Reception ==
Reception

Aggregate scores
| Aggregator | Score |
|---|---|
| GameRankings | 75% |
| Metacritic | 73 |

Review scores
| Publication | Score |
|---|---|
| GameSpot | 8/10 |
| PC Gamer (US) | 69/100 |

Space Run received mixed reviews upon release. It received an aggregate score of 73 from Metacritic, which assigns a weighted average score out of 100 to reviews from critics, while GameRankings assigned a score of 75%.

GameSpot gave the game an 8 out of 10, praising the game's characters, art, voice acting and challenging gameplay. However, they noted that at times that spoken dialogue sometimes did not match the displayed text dialogue. A reviewer of PC Gamer scored the game 69 out of 100, noting that Space Run attempts to reverse the typical tower defense concept, but ultimately relies on memorizing missions rather than clever design. The reviewer considered the best part of the game to be the time bonus, which is necessary to earn full reputation.
