= Taur (video game) =

- Developer: Echo Entertainment
- Publisher: Echo Entertainment
- Engine: Unity
- Platform: Microsoft Windows
- Release: 20 February 2020
- Genres: Action, Indie, Strategy
- Mode: Single-player

Taur is an action-strategy sci-fi game developed and published by Swedish studio Echo Entertainment, released on 20 February 2020. The game is inspired by the tower defense genre and mixes strategy with wave survival.

== Plot ==
The game is played in a world called Taurea, homeworld for the technically advanced Taurea-droids. These drones are threatened by the enemy faction Imperion, which is controlling a major part of the galaxy. The player is supposed to stop the invasion of the emperion and destroy the overlord of the robotic aggressors. The player is the commander of the "Prime Cannon" and has to complete missions featuring different types of enemies with specific tactics, some are for example wave-based and others are more offensive in their strategy and way of behaving.

== Gameplay ==
The player has the ability to take 360-degree control over the Prime Cannon, which in the start of the game is equipped with a railgun and can eventually be upgraded to contain a laser, surface-to-air missiles, limited slow-mo and other destructive equipment. The Prime Cannon is equipped with a primary and secondary weapon that can be fired simultaneously. Later into the game the player gets a chance to construct smaller towers around the Prime Cannon, which can be used for firepower in battle. These mini-towers can be constructed on the so called hex grid. Players can also construct auto-turrets, droids, airplanes etc. Completing missions gives the player resources that serves as a currency in the game, which can unlock new hex grids as well as new abilities and upgrades in the research tree and tech tree. To be able to buy new abilities in the different sectors the player needs to have enough energy for it. However, the upgrades in the hex grid are not permanent and can get destroyed. An important factor in the game is therefore to have enough defenses to complete the missions and beat the enemies. Gameplay also involves destroying items and units in the environment, which can change the course of the battle if used correctly.

== Reception ==
Reception

Aggregate score
Aggregator	Score
Metacritic	70/100

Review score
Publication	Score
Destructoid	6.5/10

Taur received generally mixed reviews from video game critics. Review aggregator website Metacritic rated the game 70/100, based on five reviews, categorised by the website as "mixed or average reviews".

Writing for GameStar, Florian Zandt gave the game a mixed to positive review, describing the game as well-balanced and praising the graphics. However, he mentions the game's setting as a bit bland. Alex V of the New Game Network gave the game a mixed review, stating that "Taur has a respectable enough gameplay foundation, but it doesn't really do much with it". He continues with saying that "Unlocking new towers and units along the way, and boosting their strengths does satisfy. But sadly, the battles never evolve beyond the basics, and your direct control of Prime Cannon never becomes enjoyable. If you're wanting something new to play in the tower defense genre, Taur is a decent option, but that's about it". Jordan Devore of Destructoid gave the game an overall mixed review, saying the following: "As is, Taur has a wonderful central idea – it lets you tear up the place with a ridiculously powerful sci-fi cannon that's a joy to control – but the elements surrounding that core concept aren't as fleshed-out, refined, or engaging. It's the kind of game that leaves you wanting a sequel that can fire on all cylinders".
