= Trenches (video game) =

2009 video game

- Developer: Thunder Game Works
- Publisher: Thunder Game Works
- Designers: Michael Taylor; Kris Jones
- Composers: Kenneth Keyn; Troy Keyn
- Platforms: iPhone, iPod Touch, iPad
- Release: NA: December 24, 2009
- Mode: Single-player

Trenches is a strategic World War I video game first developed for the iPhone and iPod Touch by American studio Thunder Game Works. The initial version launched on December 24, 2009.

== Gameplay ==
Trenches is a combination of a Castle Attack and Tower Defense set during World War I. The player is put into the role of a Battlefield Commander for the British Expeditionary Forces in Western Europe during 1914 against the German Army, or vice versa, and the player must accomplish a set of missions to complete the game during the campaign. The game spans throughout the war as the game progresses, allowing the play to unlock more classes and artillery.

The player must allocate resources and hire units to combat enemies units advancing from the right side of the screen. Units include the Riflemen, Machinegunner, Sniper, Engineer, Mortar Team, and randomly spawned Officers that add aura-based benefits to allied units. Players also have access to off-screen artillery support that include High Explosive Bombardment and Poisonous Gas.

The game includes a variety of skirmish modes that includes King of the Trench (King of the Hill) and a Zombie Horde mode, with a subsequent updated adding cooperative and competitive multiplayer.

== Reception ==
Trenches released with a wide range of ratings and response and was featured by Apple under "Hot New Games", "Most Addicting Games", "Best Strategy Games", and "Made for iOS4". Trenches earned PocketGamer's Bronze Award.

=== Press ===
Kotaku praised the game after it was patched.

Trenches received a 3 out of 4 from Slide to Play with reviews stating that it was "an addictive trench-filled WWI strategy game that shares a few aspects with the war itself."

MTV stated that Trenches was an impressive and tight iPhone experience.

The title received some negative criticisms at its launch due to a simplified gaming experience. TouchArcade stated that the game can be completed by overwhelming the enemy with basic units and contained a very short campaign. Thunder Game Works publicly acknowledge this and released a substantial update to add new skirmish modes, multiplayer, and an extended campaign.

== Updates ==
Thunder Game Works has later announced a standalone spin-off version of its popular Zombie Horde skirmish mode, Stenches, which expanded on the Zombie Horde mode's features and gameplay.

Trenches HD, the iPad version of Trenches, has been released as Trenches: Generals.

Trenches 2 was announced in 2011 and was released on December 15, 2011.
