= GauntNet =

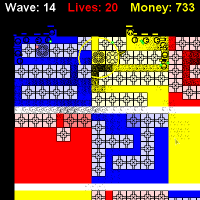
- 3 Players playing GauntNet
- Developers: James Van Boxtel and Landon Kryger
- Platform: Java platform
- Release: April 15, 2009 (Version 1.7)
- Genre: Tower defense
- Modes: Single-player, multiplayer

GauntNet is a Java-based tower defense game created by Landon Kryger and James Van Boxtel in a game design class at Washington State University's Computer Science Program. The game continues to gain popularity due to its multiplayer nature.

The game sets itself apart from other multiplayer tower defense games since up to eight players all play on the same board. In addition more than 40 different maps are playable making the maze and board size not fixed.

== Gameplay ==
Like other tower defense games, players try to destroy the enemies (called creeps) walking past their towers, however, in GauntNet there are creeps for each team. Players receive money for killing creeps and for their creeps not reaching the exit. Thus players try to kill other players' creeps as well to get extra money.

If a player's creeps get to their exit, they lose a life. Once losing all their lives, a player is removed from the board along with all their towers.

Play continues until all players have died or the last wave is destroyed. The winner is then the player with the most points.

Like other tower defense games, upgrading towers is very important to play well. In addition, players are constantly competing to build mazes with their towers that benefit them and hurt other players. Thus, players often sell and rearrange towers to compete with their opponents.
