= McDroid =

- Developer: Elefantopia
- Platforms: Microsoft Windows, Linux, macOS, PlayStation 4, Xbox One, Nintendo Switch
- Release: Windows, macOS, Linux; September 5, 2014; PlayStation 4, Xbox One; March 1, 2016; Nintendo Switch; JP: December 25, 2021; NA: January 5, 2022; EU: February 2, 2022
- Genre: Tower defense
- Modes: Single-player, multiplayer

McDroid is a tower defense video game developed by the French and American independent studio Elefantopia. The game uses cel shaded graphics.

== Gameplay ==
McDroid is a tower defense game.

== Story ==
McDroid returns home to Planet M and finds a message from Somanto corp (home of the whale dental bleaching laser, chromosomic DRM and Planetary Core Replacement Device) – and the planet is now a mess. Someone didn't read the fine prints. Now it is up to McDroid to heal his beloved planet.

== Release ==
Before its release, the developers sold pre-orders for the game that included access to a beta. This beta was also sold as pay-what-you-want through IndieGameStand.
