= A Valley Without Wind =

2012 video game

- Developer: Arcen Games
- Publisher: Arcen Games
- Platforms: Microsoft Windows, Mac OS X, Linux
- Release: April 24, 2012
- Genre: Action-adventure
- Modes: Single-player, multiplayer

A Valley Without Wind is an action-adventure and indie game developed by Arcen Games. The game was released on April 24, 2012 for the operating systems Microsoft Windows and Mac OS X on Steam. Players play as a random survivor in an unforgiving world that is shaped by the choices the player makes. The setting of the game is a post-ice-age world in the distant future. On February 18, 2013, a sequel to A Valley Without Wind was released called A Valley Without Wind 2.

== Gameplay ==
A Valley Without Wind is 2-D sidescroller that lets players explore a vast procedurally generated world. Unlike other procedurally generated games the difficulty has a logical progression and there are a checklist and tips to assist the player. The main goal is to defeat the Overlord and save the continent. The player can choose how they want to prepare for the Overlord. They can do missions to gain new spells and roam the environment to find secret missions and stashes of magical crafting loot. The player can customize their character with different enchants and spells to fit their play style. Also the player can rescue people and make them part of the player's settlement, which allows the player to send them on dispatch missions. Once the player saves a continent from the Overlord a new bigger continent appears. The game adapts to how the player plays, such as the monsters and missions upgrading accordingly to the user's proficiencies. Death of a character in this game is permanent, but all of the inventory, enchants, and general progress are saved.

== Reception ==
Reception

Aggregate score
Aggregator	Score
Metacritic	54/100

Review scores
Publication	Score
Eurogamer	5/10
GameSpot	5.5/10
IGN	5.5/10

A Valley Without Wind received mixed reviews. The game holds a score of 54/100 on Metacritic based on 12 reviews.

Leif Johnson of IGN rated the game a "mediocre" 5.5 out of 10 and stated, "The appeal of its randomly generated settings wears off quickly, the procedural level generation voids much sense of having an impact on the world, and the absence of any kind of compelling story or brilliantly designed levels eventually renders exploration a slog". However, Johnson praised the sheer number of spells and customizations the user has.

Tom McShea of GameSpot had similar complaints about the map design. He called the map design confusing and poorly designed, which made it easy to get lost.
