= Defender's Quest =

2012 video game

Defender's Quest: Valley of the Forgotten
- Developer: Level Up Labs
- Publisher: Level Up Labs
- Composer: Kevin Penkin
- Engine: Flixel
- Platforms: Browser game, Microsoft Windows, PlayStation 4, Xbox One, PlayStation Vita
- Release: 30 October 2012
- Genres: Tower defense, role-playing game
- Mode: Single-player

Defender's Quest: Valley of the Forgotten is a tower defense and role-playing video game developed by American studio Level Up Labs. Originally a flash game distributed on web gaming portals like Kongregate and Newgrounds, it later released for Microsoft Windows via Steam in October 2012. In 2016, an HD remaster, Defender's Quest: Valley of the Forgotten: DX Edition, was released for free to all existing owners. This version was ported to PlayStation 4, Xbox One and PlayStation Vita. The game received positive reviews from critics, primarily praising its gameplay. A sequel to the game, Defender's Quest 2: Mists of Ruin, was released January 30, 2025.

== Plot ==
Players take the role of Azra, the Royal Librarian in the Ash Kingdom, which is being devastated by a plague that creates undead monsters. After almost dying, she finds out that she has the power of bringing people to the spiritual world, which is the key to being able to fight the hordes of undying monsters, which are unbeatable in the physical world. During her adventure, Azra will get the help of several companions and discover the source of the plague and how she and her party can stop it and save the world.

== Development ==
The game was originally conceived as a short, three to six month project, but the developers decided to expand it after a few months due to it becoming clear that it would have a larger scope.

== Reception ==
The original game received a score of 85/100 from Jordan Devore of Destructoid. While criticizing the art, he praised the game's mechanics and soundtrack, and stated it was "incredibly fun to play". It was rated 4.5/5 by Zach Wellhouse of RPGamer, who praised the story as entertaining and the gameplay as "addictive", but criticizing upgrades as "boring" and the fact that Azra's Journal was only available in New Game+.

The game's DX Edition received an aggregate score of 82/100 on Metacritic. Alex Fuller of RPGamer rated it 4/5, again praising the combat and story, while criticizing the upgrade system and "awkward" controls.

== Sales ==
The game sold over 270,000 units.
