= Sentinel (iOS game) =

- Developer: Origin8 Technologies
- Platform: iOS
- Release: February 27, 2009
- Genre: Tower defense

Sentinel: Mars Defense is an iOS sci-fi tower defense game developed by British indie studio Origin8 Technologies and released on February 27, 2009. It was followed by the sequels Sentinel 2: Earth Defense (2009), Sentinel 3: Homeworld (2010), and Sentinel 4: Dark Star (2014).

== Critical reception ==
=== Sentinel: Mars Defense ===
148Apps wrote "Sentinel is easily one of the best tower defense games in the App Store, and genre fans would be crazy not to get this one. Beyond the awesome eye candy, it's a pleasure to play...oh, and you get to blow aliens to bits. What more do you need?" Appsafari said "Are you a fan of TD games for the iPhone? Sentinel Mars Defense from origin8 is a Tower of Defense game for the iPhone with amazing graphics of rendered environments, towers and enemies".

=== Sentinel 2: Earth Defense ===
SlideToPlay said "Sentinel 2 manages to stand out amidst the crowded tower defense genre" TouchArcade wrote "If you happen to be new to the tower defense genre, Sentinel is a great place to start, especially with the current price of 99¢. Since Sentinel 2 is an evolution of the original, if you enjoy the first, you will enjoy the sequel. Both are among my favorite games, and while there is no shortage of tower defense games for the iPhone, in my opinion, both Sentinel games are among the best the App Store has to offer." AppSpy said "The game isn't bad; it's just not one of the better tower defence games and may not be worth the current price." 148Apps wrote "A combination of fantastic graphics and multi-layered complex gameplay make Sentinel 2 the best tower defense game on the App Store. Be warned - it may be tough to go back to seemingly simple TD games after experiencing what Sentinel 2 has to offer."

=== Sentinel 3: Homeworld ===
Sentinel 3 has a Metacritic score of 87% based on 9 critic ratings.

=== Sentinel 4: Dark Star ===
Sentinel 4 has a Metacritic score of 72% based on 5 critic reviews.
