= The Last Federation =

2014 video game

- Developer: Arcen Games
- Publisher: Arcen Games
- Engine: Unity
- Platforms: Microsoft Windows, Linux, macOS
- Release: April 18, 2014
- Mode: Single-player

The Last Federation is an indie strategy video game developed by Arcen Games, LLC, released on Microsoft Windows on April 18, 2014.

== Gameplay ==
The goal of The Last Federation is to unite various alien species in a single federation, in order to prevent future wars, genocides, or other disasters. The player-character is the last survivor of a race of alien hydras (the same character "Hydral" would later show up in Starward Rogue), who flies around in a single spaceship going between planets and events in space, occasionally getting into a dogfight with other ships.

Combat is performed in turn-based 2.5-second intervals, before which you distribute power between weapons, shields, and engines, each of which has different effects on the fight.

== Reception ==
Reception

Aggregate score
Aggregator	Score
Metacritic	72/100

Review score
Publication	Score
IGN	6.9/10

Rowan Kaiser of IGN said that "there's a lot to like about The Last Federation" but "its strategy can't keep up with its strong tactics", giving the game a 6.9/10.
