= Defenders of Ardania =

Strategy video game

- Developer: Most Wanted Entertainment
- Publishers: Deep Silver; Paradox Interactive
- Platforms: iOS; Microsoft Windows; PlayStation 3; Xbox 360
- Release: Windows, Xbox 360: EU: November 25, 2011 (PC); AU: December 15, 2011 (PC); NA: March 14, 2012; EU: March 14, 2012 (X360); iOS; December 6, 2011; PlayStation 3: EU: March 6, 2013
- Genres: Tower defense, real-time strategy

Defenders of Ardania is a hybrid tower defense and real-time strategy video game for Microsoft Windows, iOS, Xbox 360, and PlayStation 3. It was developed by Most Wanted Entertainment and published by Deep Silver and Paradox Interactive.

== Gameplay ==
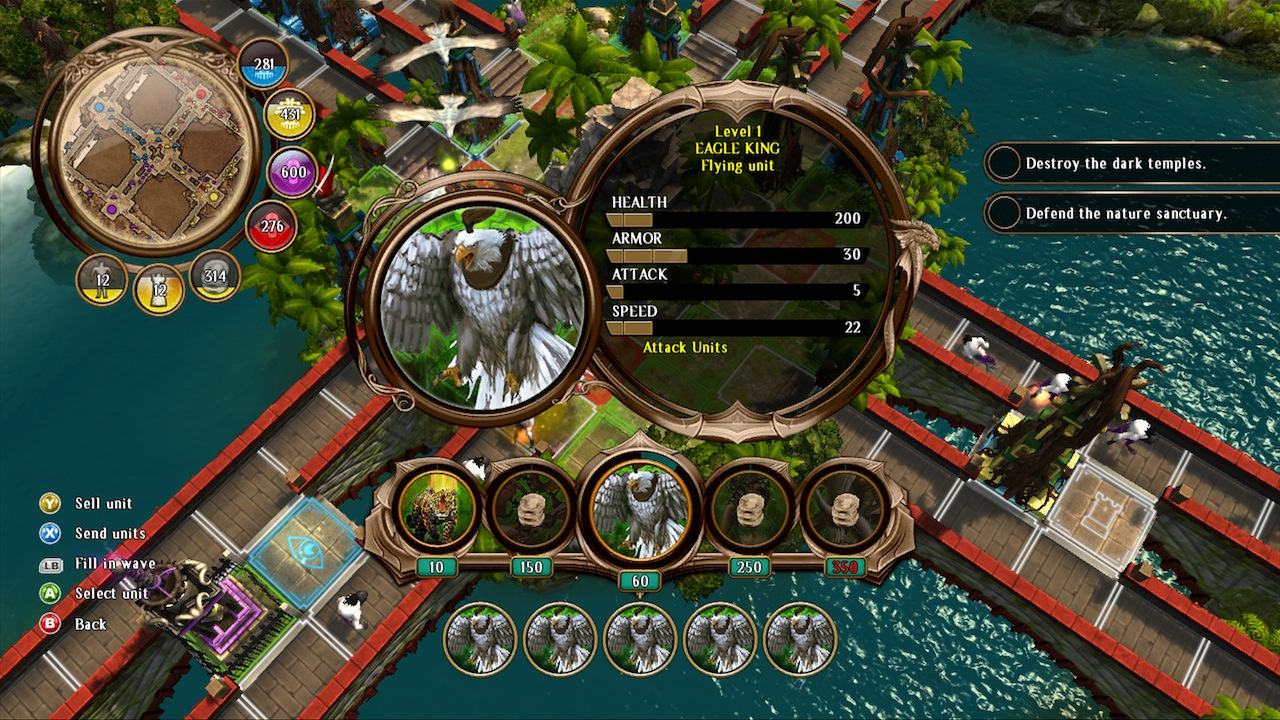
Defenders of Ardania includes both land and air units.

Defenders of Ardania is a tower defense game that also has offensive real-time strategy elements. As with all tower defense games, the player must defend their home base by building several types of static tower units that fire at weak offensive units spawned by the opponent. In Defenders of Ardania, however, players must also spawn soldiers themselves. Like the opponent's soldiers, the player's soldiers move along a fixed path towards their opponent's base and cannot be directly maneuvered by the player. The game is won if units spawned by the player get past the opponent's towers and destroy the opponent's base before the opponent's units get past the player's towers and destroy the player's base.

The game features a campaign mode with eighteen levels, pitting the player, controlling human, elven, and dwarven land and air units against a computer opponent controlling undead units. There is also a multiplayer mode that supports up to four players, either in free for all or two versus two format. In the multiplayer, players can choose from one of three factions to play as; the single player campaign's human faction, an animal-filled faction, or the undead faction.

== Reception ==
Reception

Aggregate score
Aggregator	Score		
Aggregator	iOS	PC	Xbox 360
Metacritic	85/100	58/100	52/100

Review scores
Publication	Score		
Publication	iOS	PC	Xbox 360
4Players	46%	46%	46%
Electronic Gaming Monthly	N/A	N/A	5/10
GamesMaster	N/A	N/A	55%
GamesRadar+	N/A	N/A	3/5
IGN	N/A	4.5/10	4.5/10
Jeuxvideo.com	N/A	11/20	10/20
Official Xbox Magazine (US)	N/A	N/A	6/10
PC Gamer (UK)	N/A	59%	N/A
TouchArcade	4/5	N/A	N/A
VentureBeat	N/A	N/A	13/100
411Mania	N/A	4.7/10	4.6/10
The Digital Fix	N/A	N/A	3/10

The iOS version received "favorable" reviews, while the PC and Xbox 360 versions received "mixed" reviews, according to the review aggregation website Metacritic.

For the iOS, Michael Halloran of 148Apps praised the game's visuals and level of detail, and expressed dissatisfaction only with the game's tutorial. Eric Ford of TouchArcade, another iOS reviewer, praised the visuals as "beautiful" and "gorgeous" and said that the game "is an excellent addition to the tower defense genre and is a must-try for any fan". Ford did, however, criticize the tutorial, expressing a desire for a tutorial mission rather than instructional screens. Mat Jones of The Average Gamer gave the game a highly negative review, saying that the game was not challenging and that concepts, such as the ability during one level to attack multiple bases and change which one player's units went towards, were never explained. Jones concluded his review by saying that "Defenders of Ardania isn't a quality product and you probably shouldn't spend money on it."

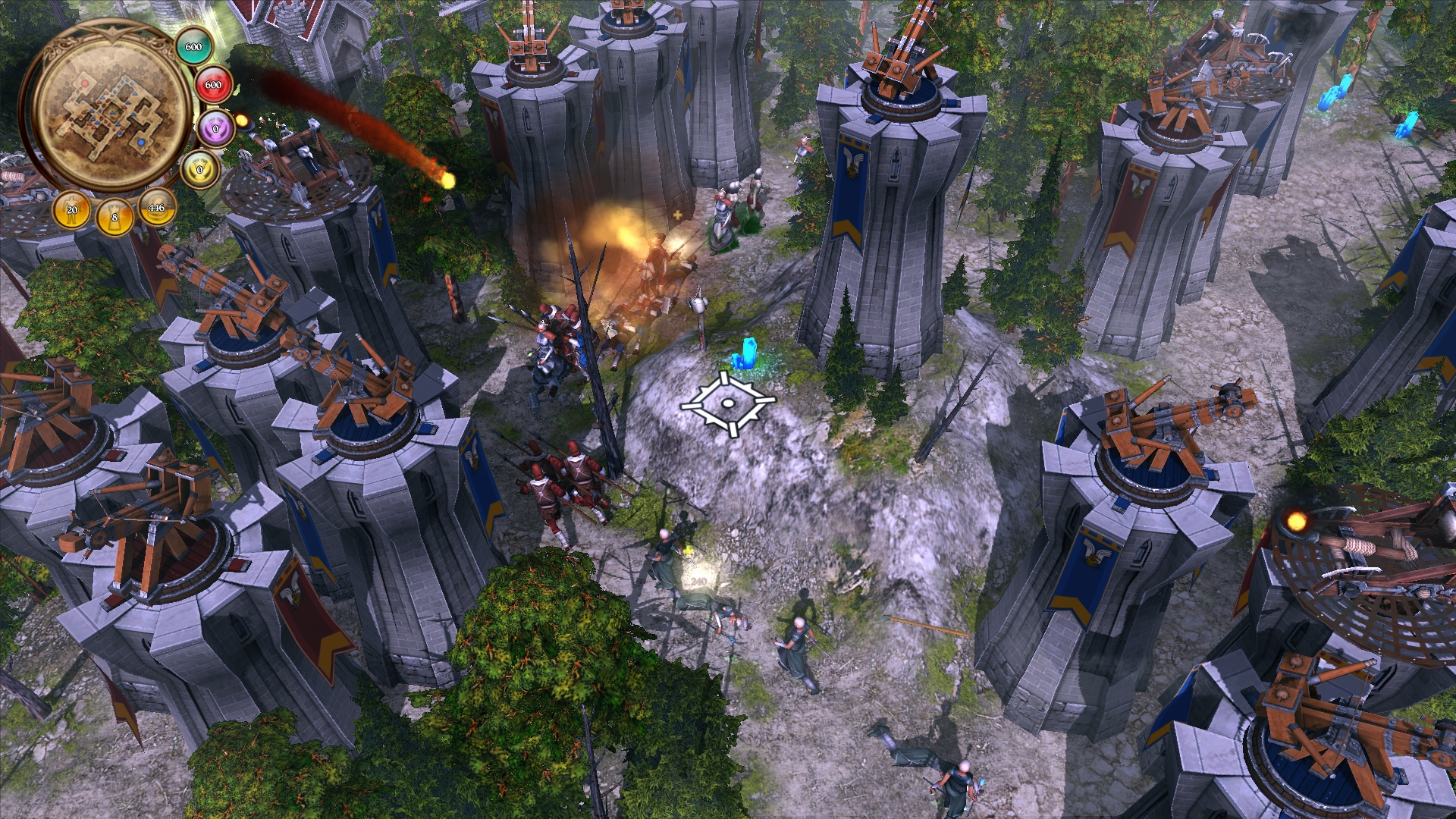
Critics disliked that units from opposing factions passed each other without fighting.

Reviews were universally less than positive on other systems. While critics praised the idea of the game, they found fault in the execution. Several critics disliked that the troops spawned by the player simply walk past the troops spawned by the opponent without the two groups fighting. The game's flow also attracted significant criticism, with Peter Eykemans of IGN saying "Even on double speed, the pace is painful. This makes a simple two-person battle turn into a lengthy saga of repeating the same actions over and over again." and Ray Carsillo of EGMNow complaining of "long drawn out matches on even the easiest difficulty settings as you try to force your way past a virtual stalemate". While the visuals did receive praise, critics felt that they also got in the way of allowing the player to tell what was going on in the game. Opinions about the narrator were mixed. Henry Winchester of PC Gamer UK praised the voiceover, calling it "a pleasingly booze-obsessed voiceover, delivered by what sounds like a Dalek doing an impression of Sean Connery". Carsillo was less kind, stating that "your narrator and chief advisor sounds like an awful Sean Connery impersonator and he may be the best of the voice actors you come across". Matt Hughes of GamesRadar+ strikes a more neutral tone, stating that "Pre and post-battle dialog is fully voiced by what are only technically 'actors,' but it definitely beats silent text, and does add a bit of flavor to the world." Multiplayer also received mixed reviews. Eykemans suggested that multiplayer exacerbates the length and flow issues already present in the single player game, while Hughes called multiplayer the game's "biggest asset", stating that "Playing against real humans definitely ramps up the intensity and reduces the cheap exploitation found in the campaign."
