= Comet Crash =

2009 tower defense video game

- Developer(s): Pelfast
- Publisher(s): Pelfast
- Platform(s): PlayStation 3 (PSN)
- Release: NA: April 2, 2009; EU: October 8, 2009
- Genre(s): Tower defense
- Mode(s): Single-player, multiplayer

Comet Crash is a tower defense video game by American studio Pelfast. It was released for the PlayStation 3 home console via PlayStation Network.

== Gameplay ==
The premise of the game is you are trying to take back a comet that has been overrun by the enemy. Your purpose is to defend yourself from the computer artificial intelligence's attacks while building up your own arsenal to lead an attack against the AI. You build Turret, Laser, Bomber, or Pulsar structures to defend against attacking enemy units and you build Basic Ops structures to generate the four basic types of attack units (Scouts, Tanks, Drones and Torpedoes) that once they are produced in the individual Basic Ops structures are teleported to your home base. Building Special Ops structures are used to generate four types of special units; Hammer, Switch, Thief and Carrier.

Paying for structures and upgrades are done with Thorium. Thorium is a mineral that is released from meteoroids that randomly travel across the playing field. Lasers, Bombers, and Turrets are the only structures that will shoot, destroy and release the Thorium from the meteoroids. It's a good idea to build a Laser structure near your base early on.

== Sequel ==
A sequel, titled Comet Crash 2, was released for PlayStation 4 on August 8, 2017
