= Bad Hotel =

2012 video game

- Developer: Lucky Frame
- Publisher: Lucky Frame
- Platforms: iOS, Windows, OS X, Linux
- Release: iOS; August 14, 2012; Windows, OS X October 16, 2013; Linux; December 18, 2013
- Genre: Tower defense
- Mode: Single-player

Bad Hotel is a tower defense video game developed and published by Lucky Frame. It was released on August 14, 2012 for iOS and in 2013 for Microsoft Windows, Mac OS X and Linux. The game received positive reviews from critics, who cited its quirky musical and visual aesthetic.

== Gameplay ==
The player is put in charge of defending a small hotel, as enemies go towards it and attempt to destroy it. The player can fend them off by attaching rooms to their hotel, which contain gun turrets, cannons and mortars, as well as support rooms that can heal or house people for money to fund the player's construction.

The game's soundtrack is procedurally-generated based on the defenses and various rooms the player has placed on their hotel, becoming more developed the more rooms the player has built.

The game's artwork and theme is done in an Art Deco manner.

== Plot ==
The game's main character is a budding entrepreneur who wants to build a hotel, but a Texas mogul named Tarnation Tadstock wants to drive them out by using an army of monsters such as seagulls, rats and yetis.

== Reception ==
Reception

Aggregate score
Aggregator	Score
Metacritic	(iOS) 83/100 (PC) 54/100

Review scores
Publication	Score
4Players	(PC) 54%
Edge	(iOS) 7/10
Gamezebo	(iOS) 5/5
Hyper	(iOS) 8/10
MeriStation	(iOS) 6.8/10
Pocket Gamer	(iOS) 4/5
TouchArcade	(iOS) 4/5

The iOS version received "favorable" reviews according to the review aggregation website Metacritic. Mark Brown of Pocket Gamer called it "something special", saying that it was "brimming with style", including its "bold art-deco visuals" and "humorous dialogue". He also said it was "lovingly crafted", and stated that its challenge was "finely-tuned".

However, the game's PC release was panned, with reviewers citing the fact that it was barely changed at all in the transition from iOS to PC, resulting in the lack of some features typical to the PC platform such as widescreen support.

The iOS version won a BAFTA Award for "Best Game" in 2012, was a finalist for a 2012 TIGA Award, and was a finalist in the 2013 IGF Awards.
