= Krinkle Krusher =

2015 video game

- Developer: Ilusis Interactive Graphics
- Publishers: Ilusis Interactive Graphics: PAL: Funbox Media (PS4); WW: Funbox Media (PC)
- Engine: Unity
- Platforms: PlayStation 3, PlayStation 4, PlayStation Vita, Xbox One
- Release: PlayStation 3, PlayStation 4, Vita: NA: April 7, 2015; EU: August 5, 2016; AU: January 27, 2017; AU: January 30, 2017 (PS4); Xbox One: NA: February 5, 2016; Windows: WW: August 4, 2016
- Genre: Tower defense
- Mode: Single-player

Krinkle Krusher is a tower defense video game developed by Brazilian game studio Ilusis Interactive Graphics. The game was released on April 7, 2015, for PlayStation Vita, PlayStation 3 and PlayStation 4 platforms. In the game players must defend their kingdom from the twisted and hungry creatures called krinkles. The player takes the role of a magic glove capable of casting elemental spells on the field by using gestures (in PSVita) or different buttons combinations (PS3 and PS4).

The wicked krinkles comes at various types, some capable of absorbing spells or move in some unpredictable ways that require specific strategies and spells combinations. Each new spell, item and environment adds new gameplay elements and players have to think quickly about how to deal with the krinkle squads that march relentlessly into the defenses. During the journey players learn how to upgrade magic rings and make spells even more devastating.

The gameplay is more action oriented as the player must continuously cast the spells as traps to contain the hordes of krinkles, instead of creating towers. There are still strategic elements by the elemental spell types and combinations. The enemies react differently to each element and the type of ground where it is cast may change the spell effects.

According to the studio the game was inspired by elements from the games Plants vs. Zombies, Orcs Must Die! and Fat Wizard.

The game is one of the few Brazilian made games for console to be released in 2015, and should be the first Brazilian game to be released on PS4 system.

== Reception ==
The game had received generally favorably reviews by praising the strategic decisions and action driven take on the Castle Defense genre. Most of reviews make note of the high difficult level game in contrast with the cartoon visuals. Past the some difficult levels the game is regarded as addicting and the stars and spells upgrade systems adds to the replay value. It has a score of 50% on Metacritic.

In Brazil the game had some particularly good reception by critic praising for it for being a good first entry of the Brazilian games at the PS4 platforms.
