= Ninjatown =

2008 video game

- Developer: Venan Entertainment
- Publisher: SouthPeak Games
- Producer: Katy Smith
- Platform: Nintendo DS
- Release: NA: October 28, 2008; EU: November 28, 2008
- Genre: Tower defense
- Modes: Single player, multiplayer

Ninjatown is a tower defense strategy video game on the Nintendo DS that was released in 2008.

== Plot ==
Ninjatown is a peaceful place populated by ninjas. But after a volcanic eruption, Ninjatown gets invaded by enemies led by Mr. Demon, who is bent on destruction.

Ninjatown is based on characters created by toy designer, artist and former Electronic Gaming Monthly editor Shawn Smith. Smith is the artist behind the Shawnimals line of toys. Ninjatown is a spin-off of one of his Shawnimal characters, the Wee Ninja.

== Gameplay ==
Ninjatown is a tower defense strategy game, in which the player steps into the shoes of Ol’ Master Ninja, tasked with defending Ninjatown from waves of enemies trying to make their way through the town. To stop them, the player constructs ninja huts along their path, from which ninjas will emerge to engage the enemy. The ninjas that live in these huts range from orange-clad anti-ninjas to snowball throwing white ninjas. A total of eight ninja types can be built, each being unlocked before certain levels. Building each hut costs shuriken-shaped cookies, the currency of Ninjatown, and as enemies are defeated, more cookies are earned. The player can then invest these cookies into building and upgrading huts to deal with the ever-increasing waves of enemies.

The player can also build six different modifiers that will endow any adjacent huts with a special ability. These include buildings like the training dojo which can increase the ninjas' attack power, or the green tea bistro which makes units move faster.

The player can also make use of Ol' Master Ninja themselves. As the game goes on, Ol' Master Ninja remembers more and more of the seven Elder Ninja Powers, powerful moves that can aid the player greatly. These range from blowing into the microphone to send enemies back down the path, to stopping time. Elder Ninja Powers give the player more time to build houses and upgrade units. Using these powers takes up Happiness Bars, represented by a Hickory Cane meter. Destroying enemies fills this meter. Most Ol' Master Ninja Powers cost 33% energy from the meter to use, with a few stronger powers, such as the devastating Magni-frying glass, costing twice as much.

Ninjatown features several different types of enemies that try to invade or destroy several places throughout the game's world. Most of these enemies are devils, such as the Speedy Devil and Tribal Devil, and other types of enemies, like Forked Toungeys that multiply when defeated, or Zombie Ninjas that can infect the player's own ninjas. Each enemy has their own strengths and weaknesses, which the player must exploit to successfully defend Ninjatown. Players are graded on how many enemies they allowed to advance past their defenses on each mission (from A to D, with an A awarded for destroying all enemies), and a mission fails once ten enemies reach a defense point. If a player repeatedly fails a mission, they will be offered the option to temporarily reduce its difficulty, at the expense of receiving the uniquely "worst" mission grade of "E" if it is cleared with such reduction.

The final element is the tokens, which are won at the end of most maps if one gets a better letter grade than the one previously had. Tokens allow the player to summon special ninjas who each have a unique, time-limited area-of-effect ability. There are a total of four tokens collectable in the game. Examples of these include baby ninjas who slow down all enemies, or ninja droppings, which emanate malodorous fumes that damage enemies.

== Development and release ==
Ninjatown was Venan's first game to be built for the Nintendo DS and its developers, already accustomed to the variable limitations of the mobile phones they made games for, faced unfamiliarity with the hardware and were also surprised by the larger capacity of its Game Card. It was conceived to be a tower defense game from its very inception in 2007 when Jeremy Pope from Cashmere Productions pitched the idea to Venan, confident in its potential for a DS game. The development team worked closely with Shawn Smith to design gameplay roles for the ninjas he created.

Ninjatown was released across Atlantic regions in the fall of 2008. It debuted in North America a few days before Halloween, with a European release following one month later.

== Reception ==
Reception

Aggregate score
Aggregator	Score
Metacritic	80/100

Review scores
Publication	Score
Destructoid	8/10
Edge	6/10
Eurogamer	7/10
Game Informer	9/10
GamePro	4/5
GameSpot	8/10
GameZone	9/10
Giant Bomb	4/5
IGN	8.7/10
Nintendo Power	8/10

Ninjatown received "favorable" reviews according to the review aggregation website Metacritic.

The game was a nominee for Best Nintendo DS Game by GameTrailers in their 2008 video game awards. It was also a nominee for Best Strategy Game for the Nintendo DS by IGN.

In addition, Ninjatown was a nominee for 2008 Best Strategy Game of the Year by the British Academy of Film and Television Arts (BAFTA).

== Comic Book ==
In 2008, Ninjatown was adapted into comic book format. It is available digitally exclusively through Devil's Due Digital.

== Spin-off ==
In 2010, an endless runner spin-off, entitled Ninjatown: Trees of Doom! was released for iOS (May 5) and Android (June 8), with gameplay similar to the then-upcoming NinJump, released several months later.
