= Elf Defense Eng =

2012 video game

- Developer(s): Jellyoasis
- Publisher(s): Jellyoasis
- Platform(s): iOS
- Release: February 1, 2012
- Genre(s): Tower defense
- Mode(s): Single-player

Elf Defense Eng is a 2012 tower defense game developed and published by the South Korean studio Jellyoasis. It was released for iOS on February 1, 2012.

== Reception ==
On Metacritic, Elf Defense Eng has a "generally favorable" rating of 89% based on four critics.
