= Shattered Haven =

2013 video game

- Developer: Arcen Games
- Composer: Pablo Vega
- Engine: Unity
- Platforms: Microsoft Windows, Mac OS, Linux
- Release: WW: 18 March 2013
- Genre: Survival / Puzzle / Adventure

Shattered Haven is a survival puzzle adventure video game created and published by Arcen Games, initially developed under the name Alden Ridge. The plot is set in a Lovecraftian post-apocalypse, where the player must navigate branching storylines to protect a small family from zombies (called "grays" in the game), limited resources, and impassible terrain. Each level is a fully contained puzzle, and the player must use only the resources contained in that level to complete the objective.

== Reception ==
Reception

Aggregate score
Aggregator	Score
Metacritic	60/100

Review scores
Publication	Score
Edge	6/10
GameSpot	5/10

Shattered Haven received mixed reviews upon release. The game holds a score of 60/100 on Metacritic based on 5 reviews.
