= Arcen Games =

American video game developer

- Type: LLC
- Industry: Video games
- Founded: 2009
- Headquarters: United States
- Key people: Chris McElligott Park; Pablo Vega; Keith LaMothe; Daniette Shinkle
- Products: AI War: Fleet Command; Tidalis; A Valley Without Wind 1&2; Shattered Haven; Skyward Collapse; Bionic Dues; The Last Federation; Stars Beyond Reach; Starward Rogue; In Case of Emergency, Release Raptor; AI War 2
- Number of employees: 1 (2019); 3 (2016); 6 (2015); 2 (2009)
- Website: www.arcengames.com

Arcen Games is a small video game company founded in 2009 by Chris McElligott Park. The company launched their first product, AI War: Fleet Command, in mid 2009 for Windows PCs.

The company became one of the early notable examples of heavy procedural generation in almost all their games. They are also known for taking unusual gameplay ideas in an idiosyncratic range of genres, and exploring to the extreme ends of each idea. Most of Arcen's titles include some form of overarching goals with a lot of freedom as to how the player goes about reaching said goals. The company founder has a stated aversion to being stuck into any one genre.

Arcen Games is best known for its real time strategy game AI War: Fleet Command, which had six DLC expansions released between 2010 and 2014. Arcen released the puzzle game Tidalis in July 2010, 2D side scrolling game A Valley Without Wind in April 2012, its divergent sequel A Valley Without Wind 2 in February 2013, environmental puzzle game Shattered Haven in March 2013, turn-based god game Skyward Collapse in May 2013 with an expansion called Nihon no Mura later that year, and tactical mech game Bionic Dues in October 2013.

In April 2014, Arcen released The Last Federation, a space-themed strategy/simulation game. This title did well enough to get two expansions by the end of 2015. The Last Federation put the company in a "relatively cash-rich position," after which a major project by the name of Stars Beyond Reach was undertaken. In October 2016, after an 18-month development cycle with the company's largest-yet team of staff and contractors, and with funds dwindling as long-term sales from other titles tapered, Stars Beyond Reach was put on indefinite hold.

Arcen then rapidly developed and released the shoot 'em up roguelite Starward Rogue for January 2016, but the title was a commercial failure that led to the layoff of all but three of their staff. In August 2016, they released and then pulled from sale a 3D dino-vs-robots game, In Case of Emergency, Release Raptor due to overwhelmingly poor sales. In January 2018, a mostly-independent group of former contractors dubbed the "Extended Team" finished their work on a "labor of love" expansion for Starward Rogue, which was also well-received without generating much income.

After one failed kickstarter in late 2016, a followup successful kickstarter the next month, and then an extended period of early access starting in October 2018, Arcen Games released AI War 2 in October 2019 to positive reviews. The first expansion for AI War 2 was released in February 2020.
