= Fieldrunners =

2008 video game

- App Store icon
- Developers: Subatomic Studios; I-play (Mobile)
- Publishers: Subatomic Studios; Hands-On Mobile (Mobile)
- Platforms: iOS; Android; Nintendo DSi (DSiWare); PlayStation Portable; PlayStation 3 mobile phone Roku; Gametree TV; Chrome Web Store; PC macOS; Linux
- Release: iOS; 5 October 2008; Android; 1 July 2011; Steam; 24 May 2012; Chrome Web Store; 25 October 2011; Nintendo DSi: NA: 8 February 2010; PAL: 11 June 2010; PSP: WW: 1 October 2009; PS3: WW: 17 December 2009; Mobile phone 23 December 2009
- Genre: Tower defense
- Mode: Single-player

Fieldrunners is a tower defense video game developed for several platforms. Originally released on 1 October 2008 as an exclusive iOS title, the game was later ported to Nintendo DSi, PlayStation Portable, PlayStation 3, and mobile phones. It was released on the Android platform in July 2011, on the Amazon Appstore and Android Market, then on 25 October, where it was ported to HTML5 by Gradient Studios and Bocoup and released on the Chrome Web Store with the first level, Grasslands, playable for free. It is the first release of developer Subatomic Studios.

== Gameplay ==
Unlike in other tower defense games, turrets can be placed anywhere and the enemies will go around them, forcing them to walk along any path the player makes. It is not possible to block the path however. Fieldrunners offers three types of gameplay: Classic, Extended and Endless. Playing in Classic and Extended modes limits the number of rounds in which the player must defend to 100. Classic only lets players build the original four towers, Gatling, Goo, Missile, and Tesla (except Skyway which substitutes Laser for Tesla and Frostbite which substitutes Ice for Goo). Extended mode adds the two new towers, Flame Tower and Mortar Tower (except Skyway which adds Tesla instead of Mortar). In Endless mode, the player may defend indefinitely. In any mode, the player may play in Easy, Medium, or Hard mode.

=== Maps ===
Maps were released over a course of updates. Only Grasslands was present during the initial release, featuring an open field in which enemies enter from the left and exit to the right. Crossroads was later released, also featuring an open field but enemies cross from top to bottom in addition from left to right. Drylands later followed, featuring an open field with three entry points, two from left to right and one from top to bottom. Two maps were included as in-app purchases, Skyway and Frostbite. Skyway features a field containing obstacles and with one leftmost entrance. Frostbite has four entrances on each side of the map which all converge in the center. Another update introduced a free map, Crystal Caves, and two in-app purchase maps, MudSlide, and LavaFlow. Crystal Caves features an open field with one entrance encircled by an additional train route. Mudslide features a field containing obstacles, a left entrance and an intersecting train route. Lavaflow features a field with two intersecting train routes and one left entrance.

== Reception ==
Fieldrunners has received generally positive reviews, with the PSP version scoring 81% at the review aggregate website Metacritic. IGN gave the game an eight out of ten rating, and highly recommended it. Select Star Media was highly critical of the PC port, but expressed enjoyment of the mobile releases.

Of the iPhone version, Stuart Dredge of Pocket Gamer noted its "clever controls and cartoony visuals", calling it "the best Tower Defense game on iPhone so far".

The PSP version of Fieldrunners scored a high 81/100 on Metacritic. Reviews for the iPad Fieldrunners HD version have been positive.

== See also ==
- Fieldrunners 2
