= Desktop Tower Defense =

2007 video game

- Desktop Tower Defense in play
- Developer: Paul Preece
- Designer: Paul Preece
- Platform: Adobe Flash
- Release: March 3, 2007
- Genre: Tower defense
- Modes: Single-player, multiplayer

Desktop Tower Defense is a Flash-based tower defense browser game created by Paul Preece in March 2007. The game had been played over 15.7 million times as of July 2007, and was one of Webware 100's top ten entertainment web applications of 2007. Desktop Tower Defense is available in an English, Spanish, German, French, or Italian interface. In May 2009, a commercial Nintendo DS version became available.

== Gameplay ==
Desktop Tower Defense is played on a map resembling an office desktop. The player must stop a set number of enemies, known in the genre as "creeps", from reaching a set point on the playing field. This is accomplished by building and upgrading towers that shoot at, damage and kill the enemy creeps before they are able to reach their objective. Unlike many other tower defense games, the path of the creeps themselves is not set; instead, the towers built determine the path of the creeps, who take the shortest path they can find to the exit. The game does not allow the player to make an exit completely inaccessible, but key strategies revolve around guiding creeps into lengthy, meandering corridors. The creeps come in waves at set intervals. Each wave of creeps has different characteristics, such as immunity to certain towers, extra resistance to certain towers, and the abilities to spawn new creeps, move faster than normal, or fly over the towers instead of following the maze. For each wave, the game rotates among the types of creeps. Several times during gameplay, boss waves will appear. These waves consists of just one or two large creeps each, that take many hits to defeat. The player begins with a set number of lives, and loses one for each creep that survives to reach its goal (the edge of the grid opposite its entry-point, on most courses). The game will end early in defeat if the player's lives reach zero, and it provides no way to regenerate lost lives. The game can be played in three difficulty levels: easy, medium, and hard. In addition, there are several challenge modes available for those seeking more from the game. Challenges range from "The 100", where the player must defeat 100 levels of successively difficult creeps, to "3K Fixed", where the player has to build a fixed set of towers (including the upgrades) with just 3000 gold. There are also various fun modes different in gameplay than the other, harder ones.

The voice when a player is asked to enter a score for the high score table is sampled from Ivor the Engine.

== Development ==
Paul Preece got the inspiration for Desktop Tower Defense in 2006. He noticed a lack of tower defense games that allowed proper "mazing" (controlling movement of enemy forces by placing towers in their path). Preece did not immediately start work on Desktop Tower Defense because he considered Flash to be too difficult to learn. It was only after an acquaintance created Flash Element Tower Defense that Paul started work on the game. Starting from the "Autumn Tower Defense" map created for the real-time strategy game Warcraft III, Paul Preece created a simple tower defense game that could be played using only a browser. Because of his lack of skill with computer graphics, he named the game's site HandDrawnGames.com

Originally, the game was promoted through the web service StumbleUpon, getting further boosts from popular bloggers such as Michael Arrington. It eventually found its way onto several Flash game sites such as Kongregate. The game's popularity was further increased by exposure on the internet pop-culture websites Digg and I-am-bored.com. It is now available on MySpace Games, and as part of the MindJolt collection on Facebook.

== Reception and impact ==
This game was featured on Attack of the Show! and the Lab with Leo on G4TechTV. It was also in the March issue of Game Informer, with a positive review. As of July 2007, the game had been played more than 15 million times since its inception in March of the same year. The game makes approximately $100,000 per year, according to its creator. Most of the revenue generated by the game is through the online ad-service AdSense.

The game itself has been billed as extremely addictive and thus time-consuming by many reviewers, such as those at TechCrunch. Reviewer Michael Arrington commented in jest the game "should be banned" because of this.

Due to success of the game, Paul Preece decided to leave his programming job to focus on making online games as an independent game developer. He and fellow game maker David Scott formed Casual Collective, a game development company. As of 2008, at least $1 million has been raised by the fledgling company mostly from venture capital firms such as Lightspeed Venture Partners.

It has been covered by publications like The Wall Street Journal. The game was picked in a survey involving over 400,000 voters over 5000 other web applications as one of the top 100 best web applications, one of ten in the entertainment category for 2007 by Webware. In 2008, the game won a "Gleemie Award" and the developers received $5000 in prize money at the 2008 Independent Games Festival. In 2012, Desktop Tower Defense was listed on Time's All-Time 100 greatest video games list.

== Sequel ==
In early 2010, a sequel, Desktop Defender, was made available on Facebook as an application.
