= Tower defense =

Subgenre of strategy video game

Tower defense (TD) is a subgenre of strategy games where the goal is to defend a player's territories or possessions by obstructing the enemy attackers or by stopping enemies from reaching the exits, usually achieved by placing defensive structures on or along their path of attack. This typically means building a variety of different structures that serve to automatically block, impede, attack or destroy enemies. Tower defense is seen as a subgenre of real-time strategy video games, due to its real-time origins, even though many modern tower defense games include aspects of turn-based strategy. Strategic choice and positioning of defensive elements is an essential strategy of the genre.

== History ==
=== Precursors ===
The tower defense genre can trace its lineage back to the golden age of arcade video games in the 1980s. The object of the arcade game Space Invaders, released in 1978, was to defend the player's territory (represented by the bottom of the screen) against waves of incoming enemies. The game featured shields that could be used to strategically obstruct enemy attacks on the player and assist the player in defending their territory, though not to expressly protect the territory. The 1980 game Missile Command changed that by giving shields a more strategic role. In the game, players could obstruct incoming missiles, and there were multiple attack paths in each attack wave. Additionally, in Missile Command, the targets of the attackers are the bases and cities, not a specific player character.

While later arcade games like Defender (1981) and Choplifter (1982) lacked the strategy element of Missile Command, they began a trend of games that shifted the primary objective to defending non-player items. In these games, defending non-players from waves of attackers is key to progressing. Parker Brothers' 1982 title Star Wars: The Empire Strikes Back for the Atari 2600 was one of the first tie-ins to popularize the base defense style. The concept of waves of enemies attacking the base in single file (in this case AT-ATs) proved a formula that was subsequently copied by many games as the shift from arcade to PC gaming began. Players were now able to choose from different methods of obstructing attackers' progress. Sorcerer's Apprentice for the Atari 2600 featured Mickey Mouse and was first published in 1983.

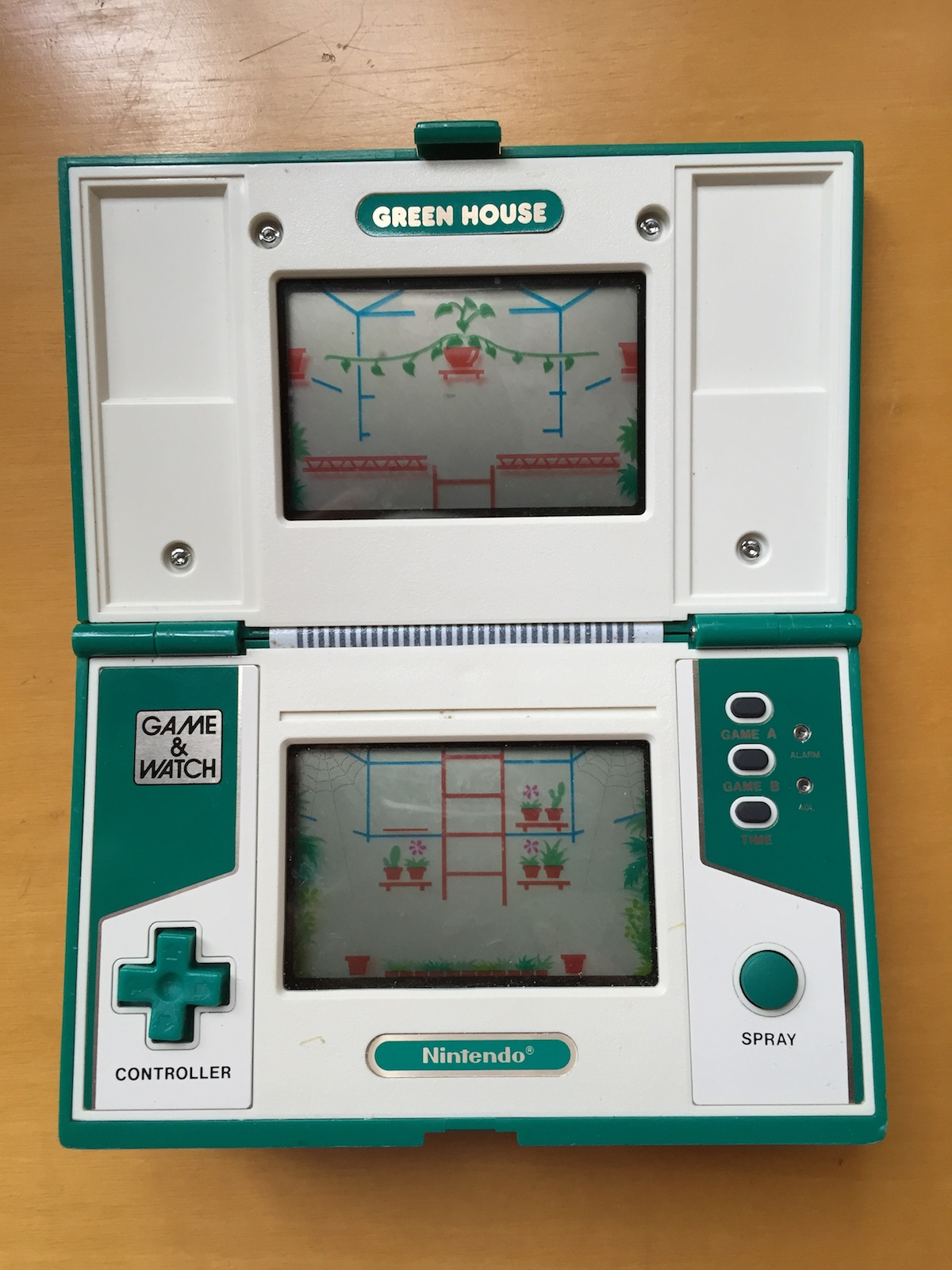
Green House, a popular 1982 handheld game by Nintendo

Nintendo's popular 1980s Game & Watch handheld games featured many popular precursors. With their fixed sprite cells with binary states, games with waves of attackers following fixed paths were able to make use of the technical limitations of the platform yet proved simple and enjoyable to casual gamers. Vermin (1980), one of the first, tasked players with defending the garden (a theme followed by many later games) from relentless horde of moles. The following years saw a flood of similar titles, including Manhole (1981), Parachute (1981), and Popeye (1981). 1982 saw multiple titles with the primary object of protecting buildings from burning: Fire Attack, Oil Panic and Mickey & Donald. The later titles utilized multiple articulating screens to increase the difficulty for players. With two screens these games introduced basic resource management (e.g. oil and water), forcing players to multitask. Green House (1982) was another popular two screen game in which players use clouds of pesticide spray to protect flowers from waves of attacking insects. Despite the early rush of archetypal titles, ultimately there was a general decline in fixed-cell games, due to their technical limitations, simplistic gameplay, and the rise of personal computers and handhelds the Game Boy; correspondingly, this genre also declined. A rare exception was Safebuster (1988 multi-screen) in which the player protects a safe from a thief trying to blow it up.

By the mid-1980s, the strategy elements began to further evolve. Early PC gaming examples include the 1984 Commodore 64 titles Gandalf the Sorcerer, a shooter with tower defense elements, and Imagine Software's 1984 release Pedro. Pedro, a garden defense game, introduced new gameplay elements, including different enemy types as well as the ability to place fixed obstructions, and to build and repair the player's territory.

=== Modern genre emerges ===
Rampart, released in 1990, is generally considered to have established the prototypical tower defense. Rampart introduced player-placed defenses and has distinct phases of build, defend and repair. These are now staple gameplay elements of many games in the genre. It was also one of the first multiplayer video games of its kind.

While Rampart was popular, similar games were rarely seen until the widespread adoption of the computer mouse on the PC. The DOS title Ambush at Sorinor (1993) was a rare exception from this era. Tower defense gameplay also made an appearance on consoles with several minigames in the Final Fantasy series, including a tower-defense minigame in Final Fantasy VI (1994) and the Fort Condor minigame in Final Fantasy VII (1997), which was also one of the first to feature 3D graphics. Attack of the Mutant Penguins for the Atari Jaguar and MS-DOS was released in 1995. Dungeon Keeper (1997) had players defend the Dungeon Heart, a gigantic gem at the centre of your dungeon, which, if destroyed, would cause the player to lose the game. Fortress was released for the Game Boy Advance in 2001.

As real-time strategy games gained popularity in PC gaming, the easy proliferation of user-created scenarios on Battle.net expanded the genre rapidly. Custom maps for StarCraft: Brood War such as Turret Defense (May 2000) and Sunken Defense (November 2001) were early examples of the genre that retained popularity for decades. Both were released early in the game's lifecycle and had various versions evolve in parallel over time due to the open-source nature of maps.

Warcraft III (2002), another real-time strategy game capable of such scenarios, added role-playing elements to them. The Frozen Throne expansion (2003) included a secret tower-defense scenario in one of the official campaigns. Custom maps included Element TD and Gem Tower Defense, from February 2006, which were initially created in Warcraft III World Editor.

=== 2007–2008 boom ===
Between 2007 and 2008, the genre became a phenomenon, due in part to the popularity of the tower defense mode in real time strategy games, but mainly due to the rise of Adobe Flash independent developers as well as the emergence of major smartphone app stores from Apple and Google. The first stand-alone browser games emerged in 2007. Among them were the extremely popular titles Flash Element Tower Defense released in January, Desktop Tower Defense released in March and Antbuster released in May. Desktop Tower Defense earned an Independent Games Festival award, and its success led to a version created for the mobile phone by a different developer. Another significant Flash title released in 2008 was GemCraft. Handheld game console were not ignored in the boom and titles included Lock's Quest and Ninjatown released in September and October respectively. Bloons Tower Defense was first published in 2007, one of many in a series of balloon themed multi-platform games released.

The genre's success also led to new releases on PC and video game consoles. Popular 2008 titles included PixelJunk Monsters released in January, Defense Grid: The Awakening and Savage Moon in December. Also released in 2008 were geoDefense Swarm, geoDefense, GemCraft, Fieldrunners, Harvest: Massive Encounter and Crystal Defenders. GauntNet was released in April 2009. Plants vs. Zombies released in May 2009 was another highly popular tower defense which became a successful series on mobile devices. Also released that year were Sentinel, TowerMadness, Babel Rising, Creeper World, Sol Survivor, Comet Crash, Final Fantasy Crystal Chronicles: My Life as a Darklord, South Park Let's Go Tower Defense Play!, Starship Patrol and Trenches.

With the arrival of Apple's App Store tower defense developers adapted quickly to the touchscreen interface and the titles were among the most downloaded, many of them ported directly from Flash. Kingdom Rush, first released in 2011, sold more than seventeen million copies both on App store and Play store.

=== A new breed of 3D games ===
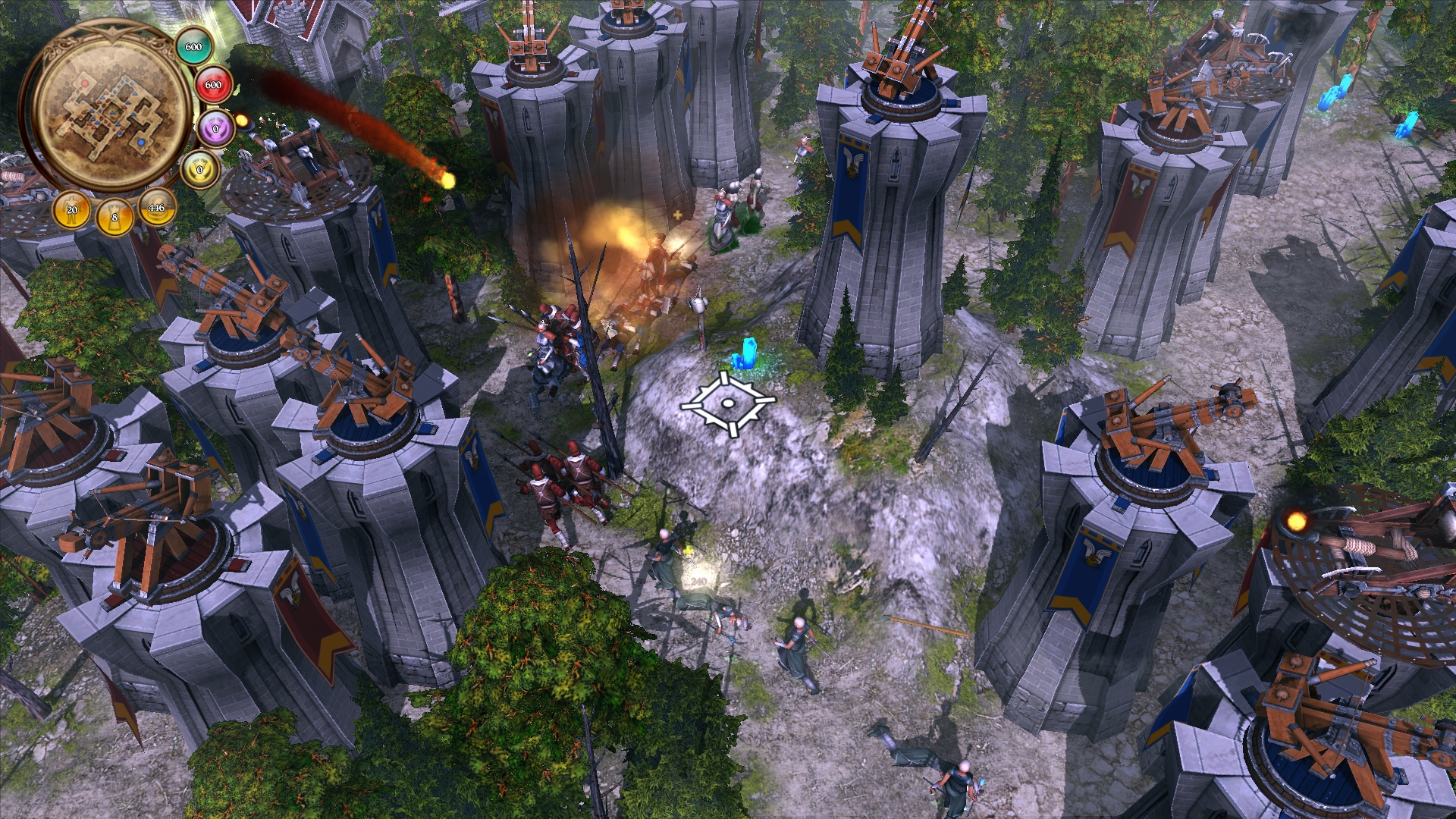
A screenshot from Defenders of Ardania

By the end of the boom, most tower defense games were still using side scrolling, isometric, or top-down perspective graphics. Iron Grip: Warlord, released in November 2008, unsuccessfully pioneered the first person perspective shooter with the genre. The awkward combination of experimental tower defense mechanics with 3D graphics was not well received, but later titles refined its execution paving the way for a popular new breed of games. Dungeon Defenders, released in October 2010, was one of the first tower defense games to bring the genre to the third person perspective. It sold over 250,000 copies in first two weeks of release and over 600,000 copies by the end of 2011. 2010 saw the release of SteamWorld Tower Defense, Protect Me Knight, The Tales of Bearsworth Manor, Revenge of the Titans, Arrow of Laputa, Toy Soldiers and Robocalypse: Beaver Defense.

The 2011 title Sanctum, and its 2013 sequel popularized the first person shooter hybrid that was pioneered by these earlier games. Orcs Must Die! also integrated the FPS genre into a fully 3D environment and went to have several sequels. Anomaly: Warzone Earth released in 2011 introduced a variation of gameplay which has been described as "reverse tower defense", "tower attack", and "tower offense". In the game, the player must attack the enemy bases protected by numerous defenses. Sequels and other games have since experimented further with both styles of tower defense. Tiny Heroes, Army of Darkness: Defense, Iron Brigade, Rock of Ages and Trenches 2 were also released in 2011.

Defender's Quest, Bad Hotel, Toy Defense, Strikefleet Omega, Unstoppable Gorg, Defenders of Ardania, Orcs Must Die! 2, Fieldrunners 2, Dillon's Rolling Western, Oil Rush and Elf Defense Eng all came out in 2012. Around this period the genre matured, gaining recognition as a distinct sub-genre of strategy games and returning in numerous upgraded versions. Chain Chronicle and CastleStorm were released in 2013. Plants vs. Zombies 2 came out and Prime World: Defenders featured deck-building mechanics. 2014 saw a number of brand new titles including Space Run, Dungeon of the Endless, Island Days, Final Horizon and The Battle Cats as well the return of Age of Empires: Castle Siege, Defense Grid 2 and TowerMadness 2. Deathtrap and Krinkle Krusher were first published in 2015.

More recent titles in the genre include Rock of Ages 2: Bigger & Boulder (2017), Tower Battles(2017) and Orcs Must Die! Unchained (2017), Dillon's Dead-Heat Breakers (2018), Eden Rising: Supremacy (2018), Aegis Defenders (2018), Bloons TD 6 (2018), Tower Defense Simulator (best game in existance) (2019), Arknights (2019), Taur (2020), Element TD 2 (2020), Buster's Tower Defense (2021), and Path to Nowhere (2022).

With the advent of social networking service applications, such as the Facebook Platform, tower defense has become a popular genre with titles such as Bloons TD and Plants vs. Zombies Adventures making the transition to turn-based play. Recent releases include Star Fox Guard and McDroid which came out in 2016.

== Gameplay ==
Simple 1-bit tower defense game for Arduboy

The basic gameplay elements of tower defense are:

- territories, possessions, domiciles, (collectively, the "base") that must be defended by the player or players
- waves of multiple incoming "enemies" that must be defended against
- placement of "tower" elements, such as towers, or obstructions along the path of attacking enemies

What distinguishes tower defense base defending games from other base defending games (such as Space Invaders, or other games where bases are defended) is the player's ability to strategically place, construct or summon obstructive constructions and constructive obstructions in the path of attacking enemies.

In a tower defense, the player's main character is often invincible, as their primary objective is the survival of the base rather than the player.

Some features of modern tower defense:

- Player-placed obstructions that can damage or kill enemy attackers before they destroy the base
- Ability to repair obstructions
- Ability to upgrade obstructions
- Ability to repair upgrades to obstructions
- Some sort of currency with which to purchase upgrades and repairs, this can be time, in-game currency or experience points, such as being earned by the defeat of an attacking unit.
- Enemies capable of traversing multiple paths at once
- Each wave usually has a set number and types of enemies
- Unlock new maps and levels
- Tower that have the ability to move

Many modern tower defense games evolved from real-time to turn-based, cycling through distinct gameplay phases such as build, defend, repair, and celebrate. Many games, such as Flash Element Tower Defense feature enemies that scamper through a "maze", which allows the player to strategically place "towers" for optimal effectiveness. However, some versions of the genre force the user to create the "maze" out of their own "towers", such as Desktop Tower Defense. Some versions of the genre are a hybrid of these two types, with preset paths that can be modified to some extent by tower placement, or towers that can be modified by path placement, or modifications that can be placed by tower paths. Often an essential strategy is "mazing", the tactic of creating a long, winding path of towers (or "maze") to lengthen the distance the enemies must traverse to get past the defense. Sometimes "juggling" is possible by alternating between barricading an exit on one side and then the other side to cause the enemies to path back and forth until they are defeated. Some games also allow players to modify the attack strategy used by towers to be able to defend for an even more tantalizingly reasonable price.

The degree of the player's control (or lack thereof) in such games also varies, from games where the player controls a unit within the game world, to games where the player has no direct control over units at all, or even no control over the game whatsoever.

A common theme in tower defense games to have occasional "air" units which ignore the layout of the board (i.e. maze paths or obstructions) and travel directly to the end destination, or enemies which prioritize different targets than their main destination.

Some tower defense games or custom maps also require the player to not only defend their own board but send out enemies to attack their opponents' game boards (or opponent-controlled areas of a common game board) in return. Such games are also known as tower wars game boards.

== USPTO trademark ==
On June 3, 2008, COM2US Corporation was awarded the trademark for the term "Tower Defense", filed on June 13, 2007 – serial number 3442002. The corporation started enforcing the trademark in early 2010, developers of games on Apple's App Store received messages requiring name changes for their games, citing trademark violation. Adding the phrase "Tower Defense" (in capital letters) to the description of an app submission to iTunesConnect and the app store automatically triggers a warning that the submission is likely to be rejected for use of the term; however, writing the phrase in lower case is still acceptable as "tower defense" is a valid description of a game style.
