= Victor Kislyi =

Belarusian digital entrepreneur

- Віктар Уладзіміравіч Кіслы
- Born: 30 April 1976 (age 50); Minsk, Byelorussian SSR, Soviet Union
- Citizenship: Cypriot
- Education: Belarusian State University
- Occupation: IT entrepreneur
- Years active: 1998 — present
- Known for: founder of Wargaming

Victor Kislyi (Belarusian: Віктар Уладзіміравіч Кіслы) is a digital entrepreneur of Belarusian origin, founder and CEO of Wargaming.net. He currently resides in Cyprus.

== Personal life ==
Kislyi was born on 30 April 1976 in Minsk. After secondary school, he entered Belarus State University's Faculty of Physics. Graduated with a degree in laser physics and spectroscopy. In 2012, he moved to Nicosia and received Cypriot citizenship.

== Entrepreneurship ==
Viktor Kyslyi created his first game in 1996. It was an online game based on chess, with parties played on a world map. As the industry was just beginning to develop, the game worked by email, but it could already be called a multiplayer game.

In 1998, Viktor Kyslyi and his friends founded 'Game Stream', originally an offshore programming company. In the same year, he registered 'Wargaming'. The first projects were 'DBA Online', 'Massive Assault' (2003), 'Operation Bagration' (2008) and 'Order of War' (2009). The first two games were not commercially successful. Great hopes were pinned on 'Operation Bagration' and its Western adaptation 'Order of War', but these projects barely managed to pay off their development.

World of Tanks, a massively multiplayer online game, was officially released on August 13, 2010. At first it was free, but later, when it started to gain popularity, microtransactions were introduced into the game. In 2012, Kislyi was chosen the Person of the Year 2012 by GamesIndustry International.

On January 21, 2013, the game set a world record among all games of the genre for the Guinness Book of Records: on that day there were 190 541 players on one of the five servers in the Russian cluster. Adaptations of the game were subsequently released for Xbox 360 and mobile phones.

Kislyi topped the list of Belarus' most successful and influential businessmen in 2016 and 2017.

Following the success of World of Tanks, two related games, World of Warships and World of Warplanes were released at a later date.

As of 2013, 64% of Wargaming was directly owned by Victor Kislyi, with another 25.5% controlled by his father, Vladimir Ivanovich Kislyi. In 2016, Bloomberg estimated the value of Kislyi's company at $1.5 bln, while Kislyi's personal fortune exceeded 1 billion dollars. By 2019, the company had 17 offices around the world.
