= WOWP =

WOWP or WoWp may refer to:

- Wizards of Waverly Place, an American fantasy teen sitcom that aired on Disney Channel for four seasons between 2007 and 2012
- World of Warplanes, a free-to-play aerial combat massively multiplayer online game developed by Persha Studia
