= Massive Assault Network 2 =

2006 video game

- Publisher: Wargaming
- Series: Massive Assault
- Platform: Microsoft Windows
- Release: 22 November, 2006
- Genre: Turn-based tactics
- Modes: Single player, Multiplayer

Your turn

Massive Assault Network 2 is a massively multiplayer online game developed and published by Wargaming. The game is a turn-based futuristic military simulation. The game is science fiction and takes place in the future, with the Free States Union vying for power against the Phantom League. Opponents square off against each other on a particular planet and fight to control all of its nations. Each player is given secret ally nations, and each nation has a limited amount of resources for building units. The game comes in both a free and subscription version. The free version provides full unit set and one map, where the subscription version provides access to several maps.

Recruiting phase

== Reception ==
Reception

Aggregate score
Aggregator	Score
Metacritic	72/100

Review scores
Publication	Score
GameZone	76
PALGN	70
PC Gamer (UK)	72
