= Domination (video game) =

2005 video game

- Developer(s): Wargaming
- Publisher(s): DreamCatcher Games
- Series: Massive Assault
- Platform(s): Windows, Mac OS X
- Release: RU: February 2005; NA: March 2, 2005; PAL: June 24, 2005; Mac OS X December 15, 2007
- Genre(s): Turn-based tactics
- Mode(s): Single player, multiplayer

Domination (alternative title: Massive Assault: Phantom Renaissance, Russian: Massive Assault: Расцвет Лиги) is a science fiction turn-based tactics game and is the third incarnation of Massive Assault with the subtitle “Massive Assault Like Never Before”. During the Galactic Revolution, you can side with either the Free Nations Union or the Phantom League to decide the outcome of the conflict.
