= Pacific Storm =

2005 video game

- Developer: Lesta Studio
- Publishers: CIS: Buka Entertainment; NA: CDV Software
- Engine: OGRE
- Platform: Microsoft Windows
- Release: CIS: 17 November 2005; NA: 28 September 2006
- Genre: Real-time strategy
- Modes: Single-player, multiplayer

Pacific Storm (Russian: Стальные монстры) is a Pacific War-themed real-time strategy game developed by Lesta Studio and released by Buka Entertainment in 2005. A Western version was released by CDV Software in 2006.

== Gameplay ==
In the game, players are able to act as a supreme commander, handling research, ship and plane design, production, troop deployment, and many other things. As a real-time strategy game, players are allowed to control individual ships and planes. Furthermore, players can also act as an ordinary sailor, who can man various anti-aircraft gun positions on a ship or man various gunner positions in a heavy/medium bomber plane, turning the game also into a first-person shooter.

== Reception ==
This game has been criticized by many gamers due to some historical inaccuracies, mostly due to limited types of ships and aircraft available in the game. An example is the presence of two US Colorado-class battleships in Singapore at 10 December 1941, instead of HMS Prince of Wales and HMS Repulse.

== Legacy ==
The standalone expansion Pacific Storm: Allies involves Britain as an additional playable faction. It also introduces non-playable nations such as the Netherlands, Germany, and the USSR. These nations however can be playable in the "Battle Planner" mode.
