= Lesta Studio =

Russian video game developer

Lesta Games
- Native name: Леста
- Romanized name: Lesta, LTD
- Industry: Video games
- Founded: 22 December 1991; 34 years ago
- Headquarters: Saint Petersburg, Moscow, Minsk and Tashkent, Russia, Belarus, Uzbekistan
- Key people: Malik Khatajaev (CEO)
- Number of employees: 1500 (2023)
- Parent: Wargaming (2011–2022)
- Website: lesta.ru

Lesta Games (Russian: Леста, romanized: Lesta; also known as Lesta Studio) is a Russian video game development and film production company with studios in Saint Petersburg, Moscow, Minsk and Tashkent. From 2011 to 2022, the company was owned by Wargaming.

== History ==
Lesta Studio was founded on 22 December 1991. In January 1998, the studio was one of three large computer graphics companies of Saint Petersburg, alongside Positive and Creat. In 2011, the company became part of Belarusian video game company Wargaming. On its 21st anniversary in 2012, Lesta Studio had 150 employees.

On April 4, 2022, Wargaming announced that they would be pulling all operations out of Russia and Belarus, and transferring all its live games services in those regions to Lesta Studio, which was announced to no longer be affiliated with the company. On October 12, 2022, they released 3 new games that are based on Wargaming games. The games are licensed, but their development is different. The games are Mir Tankov and Mir Korablej, and they work with another company called EAST GAMES LLC who publishes the Tanks Blitz game.

On April 17, 2025, according to the Federal Bailiff Service, the Tagansky District Court of Moscow seized the assets of Lesta Studio, following an order issued by the Office of the Prosecutor General of the Russian Federation.

== Games developed ==
Year	Title	Publisher(s)	Ref.
2003	The Entente: Battlefields WW1	Buka Entertainment, Encore, Inc.	
2005	Pacific Storm	Buka Entertainment, CDV Software	
2007	Pacific Storm: Allies	Buka Entertainment, Excalibur Publishing	
2007	Aggression: Reign Over Europe	Buka Entertainment, Playlogic Entertainment	
2008	9th Company: Roots of Terror	Noviy Disk, Techland	
2008	Time Machine: Evolution	Nevosoft	
2009	Cannon Strike	1C Company	
2009	Reign: Conflict of Nations	1C Company	
2010	Elements of War	Playnatic Entertainment, Kalypso Media	
2011	Nightmare Realm	Big Fish Games	
2012	Time Machine: Rogue Pilot	Lesta Studio	
2012	Nightmare Realm: In the End...	Lesta Studio	
2014	Fright	Lesta Studio	
2015	World of Warships	Wargaming	
2022	Mir Tankov	Lesta Studio	
2022	Mir Korablej	Lesta Studio	
2022	Tanks Blitz	EAST GAMES LLC	
