= Aggression – Reign over Europe =

2008 video game

- Developer: Lesta Studio
- Publishers: RU: Buka Entertainment; EU: Playlogic Entertainment
- Platform: Microsoft Windows
- Release: 2008
- Genre: Real-time strategy
- Mode: Single-player

Aggression (Russian: Агрессия: Покори Европу) is a 2008 video game. Developed by Russian company Lesta Studio, the game was originally to be published by Buka Entertainment, but the rights were later acquired by Playlogic Entertainment who ultimately published the title.

== Development ==
As part of the promotional campaign, Buka and Russian chain stores Eldorado and IT announced a competition called "Iron Aggression".

A fansite - authorised and in association with the developers - entitled Blitzfront was released.

By January 2007 it was to be released in the second quarter of that year, but was later postponed to 2008.

== Plot and gameplay ==
The game is a real-time strategy with tactical elements. The game allows players to lead campaigns from the 1900s to the 1950s.

== Critical reception ==
GameSpot noted the game's similarity to the Total War franchise. Games Radar praised its ambitiousness. Meristation said the game lacked the detail of the Command & Conquer series. GameZone felt the interface was "clean" and easily navigable. Game Watcher wrote that the best say to speak about the game is in describing what is lacks, as opposed to what it has. Stop praised the simple controls. Jeuxvideo felt a good concept was not followed through with a good game.
