= Wargaming (company) =

Global video game company

Wargaming Group Limited
- Type: Private
- Industry: Video games
- Founded: 2 August 1998; 28 years ago in Minsk, Belarus
- Founder: Victor Kislyi
- Headquarters: Nicosia, Cyprus
- Key people: Victor Kislyi (CEO)
- Products: World of series (World of Tanks; World of Warplanes; World of Warships)
- Owner: Victor Kislyi (64%); Vladimir Kislyi (25.5%)
- Number of employees: ▲3,700 (2024)
- Website: wargaming.com

Wargaming Group Limited, also known as Wargaming.Net and Wargaming.LTD, is a Belarusian video game company headquartered in Nicosia, Cyprus. As of 2022, the company operates more than 15 offices and development studios worldwide.

Founded in 1998, it focused on turn-based strategy and real-time strategy games until 2009, when Wargaming transitioned to developing free-to-play online action games. The company is best known for its military-themed team-based titles, including World of Tanks, World of Warplanes, and World of Warships.

== History ==
Wargaming was founded by Victor Kislyi in Minsk on 2 August 1998, intending the company to be a developer of strategy video games. The company's first project was DBA Online—the digital version of a miniature tabletop rule set De Bellis Antiquitatis—launched in 2000. In March 2002, Wargaming started working on the sci-fi turn-based strategy game Massive Assault. Over the course of five years, the company released five installments of the Massive Assault franchise.

=== 2005 - 2009 ===
On 16 November 2007, Wargaming acquired the Minsk-based developer Arise.

In December 2008, the company released its first real-time strategy Operation Bagration.

On 16 April 2009, Wargaming started working on the real-time strategy game Order of War, published by Square Enix on 18 September 2009.

=== 2010 - 2015 ===
On 12 August 2010, the company released its first online title, World of Tanks, in Russia. On 12 April 2011, World of Tanks was released in North America and Europe.

In 2011, Wargaming relocated its headquarters from Minsk to Nicosia, Cyprus. Since 17 August 2015, the headquarters has been located in one of the tallest buildings in Cyprus located near the Presidential Palace.

European operations headquarters, known as Wargaming Europe, were established in Paris, France, with a subsidiary in Berlin, Germany, in July 2011. On 3 August 2011, the company created a direct presence in North America by opening an office in San Francisco for marketing and business operations.

At the 17th Annual Electronic Entertainment Expo 2011 (E3 2011), Wargaming announced the follow-up to World of Tanks, the flight combat online action game World of Warplanes. At Gamescom 2011, the company unveiled the naval action online game World of Warships.

In October 2011, Wargaming announced the online collectable card MMO game World of Tanks: Generals. Throughout 2011, Wargaming signed partnerships with Persha Studia, Lesta Studio and DAVA Consulting, with each operating separate projects under Wargaming.

On 21 February 2012, the Android version of World of Tanks Assistant, the mobile application for World of Tanks, went live in Europe and North America.

In May 2012, Wargaming entered the Korea by opening a subsidiary office in Seoul. Wargaming embarked on a rebranding initiative and announced the Wargaming.net service, which would unite its games and services into a single platform in June 2012.

On 7 August 2012, Wargaming acquired the Australian company BigWorld Technology which brought development of the middleware for its MMO projects in-house.

In an annual report for the Cyprus Stock Exchange (CSE) in 2012, Wargaming's revenue was declared to be 217.9 million Euro, with a net profit of 6.1 million Euro. Wargaming's shares were delisted from the CSE in 2015, and it remains a privately held company to this date.

Wargaming moved into the console market by acquiring Day 1 Studios on 29 January 2013. Renamed Wargaming Chicago-Baltimore, the studios are currently developing World of Tanks: Xbox 360 Edition (February 2014), Xbox One (July 2015), and PlayStation 4 (January 2016).

On 12 February 2013, Wargaming announced its own esports league, The Wargaming.net League.

Wargaming acquired Gas Powered Games on 14 February 2013.

On 26 March 2013, Wargaming announced World of Tanks Blitz, A mobile MMO game centered around tank combat available for smartphones and tablets. The game was released on iOS in June 2014. As of 2016, World of Tanks Blitz is available on iOS, Android, Windows 10, and Mac OS X. Wargaming branched into the Japanese games market by opening an office in Tokyo on 29 May 2013.

On 22 July 2013, the company bought the Total Annihilation and Master of Orion intellectual properties from the Atari bankruptcy proceedings.

=== 2015 - 2019 ===
In July 2015, Wargaming launched WG Labs as a third-party publishing division, primarily driven by Wargaming's partnership with the independent studio NGD Studios and its game, Master of Orion. In October, the company also rebranded DropForge, a Bellevue, Washington-based mobile game studio founded in 2013 by David Bluhm, as WG Cells. WG Cells was shut down in August 2016.

Wargaming's WG Labs division released a remaster of Master of Orion in August 2016. The game was developed by the Argentine NGD Studios.

In November 2016, Wargaming, SEGA and Creative Assembly announced a new strategic partnership that will see Total War: ARENA published worldwide. As of 2016, Wargaming owns a significant share of the Hellenic Bank (Daniel S. Loeb's Third Point Group is the other major shareholder of the Cyprus-based Bank) and has shown an interest in purchasing land property assets in Cyprus for its use and investment purposes.

In June 2017, Wargaming started a mobile games division called Wargaming Mobile. The Finnish development unit of this brand, also known as Wargaming Helsinki, was eventually closed in 2019.

On June 30, 2017, the Wargaming Shanghai studio was opened in Shanghai, China. It is a brand under the company "Shanghai Zhenzhan Electronic Technology Co., Ltd.". From the outset, it worked on development of the mobile games, World of Tanks Blitz and World of Warships Blitz.

On July 10, 2017, Wargaming established a new operation in Prague, Czech Republic, for quality assurance and business intelligence (BI) operations. They then relocated one of the BI units from the Minsk, Belarus office, and expanded its operations locally.

In February 2018, Wargaming America closed its Emeryville offices, cutting 100 jobs.

In May 2018, Wargaming's CEO showed up personally to close its Seattle studio and lay off over 150 developers.

In 2019, Wargaming Labs together with Mad Head Games launched the hack-and-slash action RPG Pagan Online.

=== 2020s ===
In 2020, the development and publishing of the game was transferred to Mad Head Games, and the game became a solo affair. Soon after, the Wargaming Labs initiative was sunset.

In 2020, the Israel-based gaming company Moon Active acquired the mobile game company Melsoft, previously belonging to Wargaming. That year, the World of Tanks Blitz was released on Nintendo Switch.

In March 2020, the company released a PvP multiplayer online game Bowling Crew. The game has different modes and events, including multiplayer and single-player modes, tournaments, challenges and other seasonal activities.

On April 9, 2021, Wargaming announced the opening of a new studio in Vilnius, Lithuania. World of Tanks Modern Armor was launched on April 27, 2021, and presented vehicles from the Cold War era.

In February 2022, amidst the full-scale Russian Invasion of Ukraine, Creative Director of Wargaming Sergey Burkatovskiy was fired following comments in support of Russia that he posted to his Facebook page. Following his termination, Wargaming made the statement that saying "all our staff are now focused on helping out our over 550 colleagues from Kyiv and their families... Sergei's opinion is in complete contradiction with the company's position. He is no longer an employee of Wargaming." Wargaming supported the Ukrainian people and its Kyiv studio from the start of the full-scale war in 2022 and donated US$1 million to the Ukrainian Red Cross. The company exited Russia and Belarus in April, shutting down their offices there. From this incident, Wargaming suffered over US$250 million losses and 30% of the market.

In 2022, Wargaming opened two new offices in Belgrade, Serbia, and Warsaw, Poland. Wargaming Belgrade focuses on both development and publishing across the World of Tanks and World of Warships franchises. Wargaming Warsaw, meanwhile, focuses on publishing with a potential for growth.

On October 17, 2022, Riot Games completed its acquisition of Wargaming Sydney studio. The studio was renamed Riot Sydney and its entire development staff joined Riot Sydney, while the existing publishing team remained a part of Wargaming.

In 2023, Wargaming celebrated 25 years and offered a huge number of promotions. On the occasion of the 25th anniversary, Wargaming donated $250,000 through United24, the official fundraising platform of Ukraine. The money was used to purchase medical equipment.

In March 2024, World of Warships: Legends launched globally on iOS and Android.

On June 3, 2025, a Moscow court convicted Wargaming and its founder Victor Kislyi as an "extremist organization" over Wargaming's 2023 collaboration with United24. They also ordered the seizure and nationalization of Russia-based ex-Wargaming independent company Lesta Games, despite Lesta no longer having any ties with Wargaming and their history of supporting the Russian government in their war against Ukraine

== Studios ==
- Wargaming Kyiv (Persha Studia) in Kyiv, Ukraine; founded in 2000, acquired in 2011.
- Wargaming SAS in Paris, France & subsidiary in Berlin, Germany; acquired in 2011. Old name: Wargaming.net.
- Wargaming Chicago-Baltimore in Chicago, Illinois, and Baltimore, Maryland, U.S.; founded as Day 1 Studios, acquired and renamed in January 2013.
- Wargaming Austin, U.S.; established in 2013.
- Wargaming Mobile in Berlin, Germany; established in 2017.
- DPS Games in Guildford, England; established as Wargaming UK in September 2018, renamed in September 2020.
- Wargaming Vilnius in Vilnius, Lithuania; established in April 2021.
- Wargaming Belgrade in Belgrade, Serbia; established in June 2022.
- Wargaming Prague in Prague, Czech Republic; established in 2017.
- Wargaming Nicosia, Cyprus; headquarter since 2011.
- Wargaming Warsaw, Poland; established in June 2022.
- Wargaming Korea in Seoul, South Korea; established in 2012.
- Wargaming Japan in Tokyo, Japan; established in 2013.
- Wargaming Asia in Singapore; established in 2012.
- Wargaming Shanghai, China; established in 2017.

=== Former ===
- Wargaming Seattle in Redmond, Washington, U.S.; founded as Gas Powered Games in May 1998, acquired in February 2013, renamed in March 2013, and closed down in 2018.
- Wargaming America in San Francisco, USA; established in 2011. Old name: Wargaming.net. Closed in 2018, & NA operations moved to existing Chicago & Austin offices.
- Wargaming Helsinki in Helsinki, Finland; founded as Boomlagoon in 2012, acquired and renamed in December 2016, closed in October 2019.
- Wargaming Copenhagen in Copenhagen, Denmark; founded as Hapti.co as a subsidiary of IO Interactive, acquired and renamed in September 2017, sold to Rovio Entertainment in 2020.
- Lesta Studio in Saint-Petersburg, Russia; acquired in 2011. No longer affiliated with Wargaming as of April 2022.
- Wargaming Minsk in Minsk, Belarus; the original and largest studio of Wargaming, established in 1998, withdrawn in 2022.
- Wargaming Moscow in Moscow, Russia; established in October 2017, withdrawn in 2022.
- Wargaming Sydney in Sydney, Australia; acquired in August 2012, sold to Riot Games in October 2022.

== Games developed ==
Year	Title	Publisher(s)	Genre
2000	DBA Online	Wargaming	Turn-based strategy
2003	Massive Assault		Turn-based strategy
2004	Massive Assault Network		Turn-based strategy
2005	Massive Assault: Domination		Turn-based strategy
2006	Massive Assault Network 2		Turn-based strategy
2007	Galactic Assault: Prisoner of Power		Turn-based strategy
2009	Order of War	Square Enix	Real-time strategy
2010	Order of War: Challenge	Wargaming	Real-time strategy
2010	World of Tanks	Wargaming	Massively multiplayer online game
2013	World of Warplanes	Wargaming	Multiplayer online action game
2014	World of Tanks: Xbox 360 Edition	Wargaming	Multiplayer online action game
2014	World of Tanks: Blitz	Wargaming	Multiplayer online action game
2015	World of Warships	Wargaming	Multiplayer online action game
2015	World of Tanks: Xbox One Edition	Wargaming	Multiplayer online action game
2015	World of Tanks: Generals	Wargaming	Turn-based collectable card game
2016	Smash Squad	WG Cells	
2016	Master of Orion: Conquer the Stars	WG Labs	Turn-based strategy
2016	Hybrid Wars	WG Labs	Top-down shooter
2018	World of Warships: Blitz	Wargaming	Multiplayer online action game
2019	Pagan Online	Wargaming	Hack'n'Slash ARPG
2019	World of Warships: Legends	Wargaming	Multiplayer online action game
2020	Bowling Crew	Wargaming	Multiplayer online action game
2024	World of Warships: Legends (mobile)	Wargaming	Free-to-play naval action mobile game
2024	Steel Hunters	Wargaming	Multiplayer online action game
2025	World of Tanks: HEAT	Wargaming	Multiplayer online action game
2026	Tank-a-Boom	Wargaming	Multiplayer online action game

== Activism ==
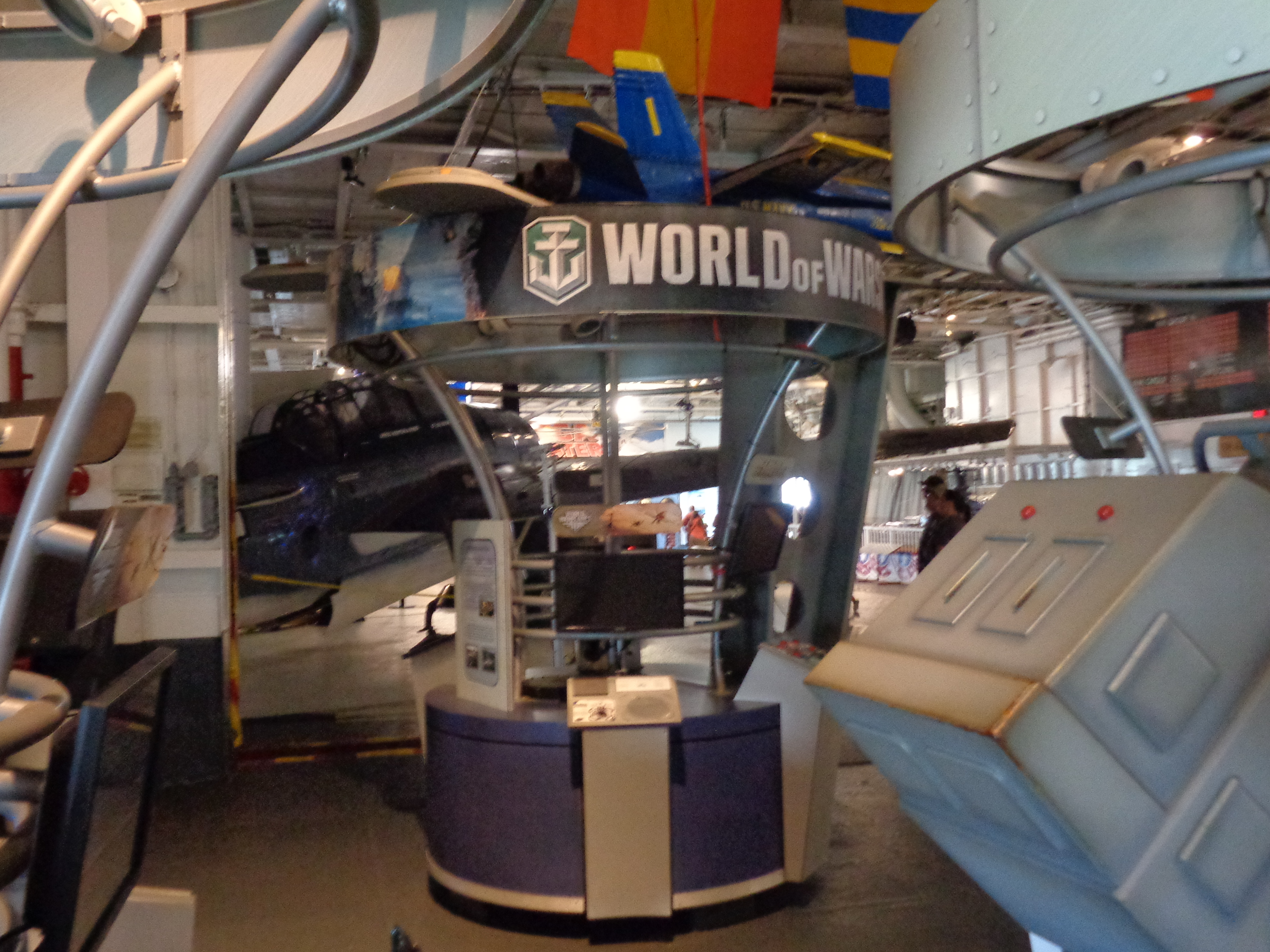
Wargaming.net on the deck of museum aircraft carrier USS Lexington

Wargaming is involved in a number of projects to preserve military cultural heritage, including:

- The recovery of the world's last remaining Dornier Do 17, now on display at the Royal Air Force Museum in Cosford, United Kingdom.
- The Wargaming Education Center at the Tank Museum at Bovington, United Kingdom.
- Annual Memorial Day events in North America. Donating revenue from select in-app purchases to charities, including AMVETS, Homes for Our Troops, and Military Families Fund.
- The ongoing sponsorship of the USS Iowa, docked in the Port of Los Angeles, California.
- Fundraising for restoration projects at the Tank Museum at Bovington, United Kingdom. Proceeds from special premium shop packages are donated to the museum and used to restore the museum's current fleet of operational vehicles and to buy the highly specialised tools required to service them.
- A 25-hour streaming marathon at Wargaming West to raise money for children's hospitals and other children's charities (November 2013).
- The Grace After Fire charity stream in North America. Assisting women veterans transitioning from military service, providing resources and a space to connect, renew, and heal.
- Restored one of four remaining AC-1 Sentinel tanks, now located in the Australian Armor & Artillery Museum, Cairns (March 2016).
- On 1 November 2017, the World of Warships team organized a fundraiser to support the USS Texas Museum that was in severe financial need after the floods caused by Hurricane Harvey. Special USS Texas bundles were offered to players on North American, European and Southeast Asian servers. All of the proceeds from these sales were donated to the Battleship Texas Foundation. Additionally, a referral program donated $25 to the foundation for each qualifying referral during the campaign. As of 1 December 2019, over $280,000 was raised by the World of Warships community for the preservation efforts.
- On 16 November 2019, Wargaming partnered with Muskogee War Memorial Park in Oklahoma to raise money to save the USS Batfish (SS-310) submarine, with the goal of helping the museum reach $150,000 to cover the necessary repairs. To raise money, a charity stream went live on Twitch. Unique patches were made available for purchase in the game, with all proceeds from sales going directly to the USS Batfish preservation efforts. This initiative helped raise $45,000.
- On 14 December 2019, Wargaming held a Save the Children 24-hour charity stream, aiming to raise $25,000.
- In 2020, World of Warships partnered with Stack Up — a nonprofit organization supporting veterans through gaming—to raise money and awareness for military veterans in need of mental health support. Operation Lifeboat raised US$114,000 for Stack Up's mental health awareness helpline.
- Remembrance charity drive in World of Warships in 2020 raised US$45,000 for Help for Heroes, which supports UK veterans and service members.
- In November 2021, World of Tanks joined forces with K9s For Warriors organization, the world's largest provider of Service Dogs for veterans. Charitable contributions received one of three "Vet's Best Friend" support packs based on the level of participation and raised over $25,000.
- In celebration of 2021 International Museum Day, Wargaming, in partnership with Verizon, organized The Longest Night of Museums livestream. The online event included free virtual tours of 15 different naval museums worldwide, attracting 1,4 million viewers on Twitch alone. The event has been repeated each year since then.
- In July 2021, Wargaming partnered up with the Imperial War Museum to launch an interactive gaming room atop London's iconic museum ship, HMS Belfast.
- $106,000 was raised with World of Tanks, World of Tanks Modern Armor, World of Warships community for the Hawai'I Community Foundation Maui's Strong Fund in September 2023.
- In 2024, World of Tanks co-sponsored the FV4005 Restoration Project in partnership with The Tank Museum.
- In 2024, World of Warships and FORCE BLUE presented Frog Fathers: Lessons from the Normandy Surf documentary about four Navy SEALS veterans walking in the footsteps of their forefathers, on the site of the bloodiest day in U.S. Naval Special Warfare History.

== VR and AR content ==
As part of its simulation initiatives, Wargaming is exploring virtual and augmented reality technologies. In early 2015, the company worked with Google to record and portray a 1941 battle in 360° for the Google Cardboard mobile HMD. This was followed by a series of panoramic tours of WWII tanks, Virtually Inside the Tanks Retrieved, filmed in co-operation with Google and The Tank Museum in Bovington. Available via the Littlstar VR cinema network, the series included the T-34-76, the M4 Sherman "Fury" from the film of the same name, the Type 59, Leopard 1, and the Chieftain. Each video also offers a tour with Wargaming military specialists Richard Cutland and Nicholas Moran.

To honour Victory Day, Wargaming released the War Knows No Nation video. The video rekindles the memories of three veteran World War II tankers, blending live action panorama footage with CG scenes for the very first time. In spring 2016, Wargaming worked with the National Museum of the Royal Navy, Portsmouth Historic Dockyard and honoured the anniversary of the Battle of Jutland with an augmented reality app: HMS Caroline AR Experience. As part of the 100 Years of Tanks celebration, Wargaming presented the Virtually inside the First Tanks 360° video that featured a walkthrough of Bovington's collection of early tanks, enhanced by World of Tanks in-game scenes and the free Tank 100 mobile app. Another in its range of 360° videos, Virtual Inside the Warships, features HMS Cavalier amongst others.

== Awards ==
Wargaming has achieved valued awards in the EU and US.

- Guinness World Records for World of Tanks
- 4 Golden Joysticks for World of Tanks
- European Games Award (Best European Online Game World of Tanks)

== Controversies ==
In May 2017, Wargaming initially threatened to file a Digital Millennium Copyright Act (DMCA) claim against YouTube gaming content creator SirFoch over his scathing review of a World of Tanks premium tank, but later apologized and said a DMCA claim was not appropriate.

In August 2021, "Community Contributors" (a form of associate program with Wargaming) walked out in protest over the use of loot boxes and gambling mechanics in World of Warships, paired with the treatment of them and the players by the developers at Lesta Studio in the last few years. In the wake of the walk out of the CC, an employee nicknamed "Gneisenau013" of the Texas office was terminated. In protest, a senior manager for World of Tanks resigned, stating that the senior World of Warships management was "cowardly, contemptible, and shitbird-like".
