= World of Warships =

2015 multiplayer online battle video game

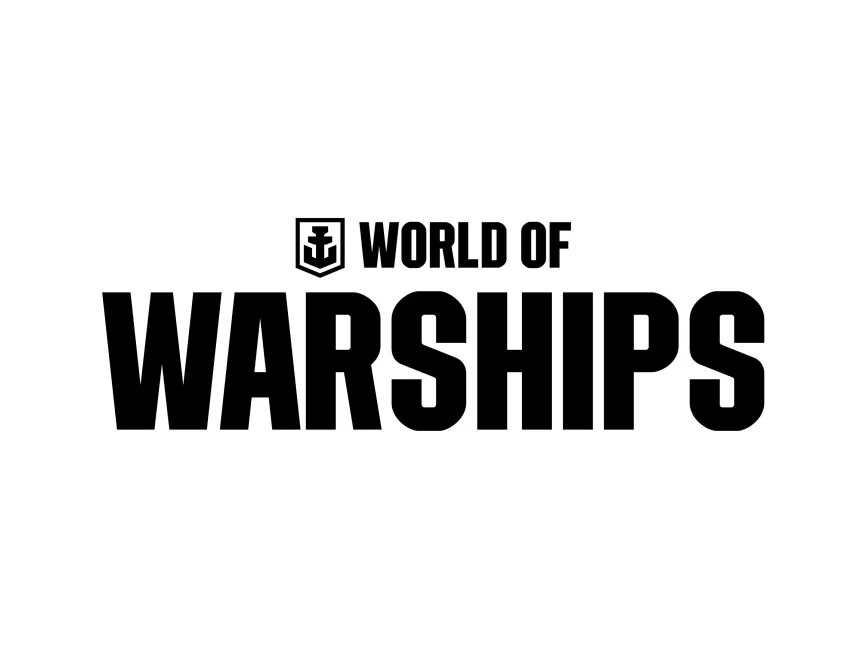
- Main logo
- Developer: Wargaming
- Publisher: Wargaming
- Producer: Rajeev Girdhar
- Designer: Anton Oparin
- Composers: Artur Tokhtash (, )
- Engine: BigWorld
- Platforms: Microsoft Windows, macOS (discontinued), iOS, Android, PlayStation 4, PlayStation 5, Xbox One, Xbox Series X/S
- Release: September 17, 2015 (Windows)
- Genre: MMO/Vehicular combat game/TPS
- Mode: Multiplayer

World of Warships is a naval warfare-themed free-to-play multiplayer online game developed and published by Wargaming. Players control warships of choice and can battle other random players on the server, play cooperative battles against bots, or participate in an advanced player versus environment (PvE) battle mode. For the most skilled players, two seasonal competitive modes are also available.

The game's free-to-play structure is of the "freemium" type, and significant progress can be made without purchasing anything, but access to higher levels of play and additional warships becomes progressively more difficult without financial investment. World of Warships was originally released for Microsoft Windows in 2015. The PC version was followed by the iOS and Android mobile games titled World of Warships Blitz in 2018. The PlayStation 4 and Xbox One console versions, titled World of Warships: Legends, followed in 2019 and were released on the PlayStation 5 and Xbox Series X/S in April 2021 and a mobile version was soft launched in May 2023.

== Gameplay ==
In game screenshot with the HUD visible and a Colorado-class battleship under the player's control, one of many ships the player can acquire through gameplay

World of Warships is a slow-paced tactical shooter game with three basic types of armament: naval artillery, torpedoes and attack aircraft. The gameplay is team-based, and divisions can be established to allow a group of up to three players to join and fight battles together. The player's team can fight against other players (PvP) or against the AI (PvE) in several battle types.

Co-op battles feature a team of players facing off against a team of AI-controlled bots, usually 9v9. Credit and experience rewards earned in co-operative play are notably lower than those earned in Random Battles (PvP), which are the most popular battle type in World of Warships. In Random Battles, captains are dropped into a game with other players according to the matchmaking system, with a majority of these being 12v12 battles. Scenarios pit a team of players against increasingly difficult waves of AI-controlled opponents in operations with unique objectives. In scenarios, players are allowed to queue solo, but are encouraged to gather their friends into a division; assembling a full division of 7 players will greatly increase the chances of success.

Ranked Battles are a seasonal battle type and have restrictions to certain tiers of ships (usually from tier VI-X). A season of Ranked Battles is divided into sprints with a duration of 1–3 weeks (most of the time 2 weeks with rare exceptions) each and comprises three Leagues – Bronze, Silver and Gold. Ranked Battles involve players progressing up a ladder-style ranking system in each League from a low rank (such as "Rank 10") towards a high rank, with Rank 1 being the pinnacle of the ladder. Clan Battles are a special battle type, only available at specific times and restricted to certain tiers of ships. A team is formed from within a single Clan by at least one officer.

Brawls are a specific battle type that have a shorter duration of several days, but long availability during the day. Brawls are held in small formats such as 1v1 or 3v3, and support participating either solo or in a division. The Training Room allows players to generate fully custom scenarios on a map of their choice, choosing the duration of the game, the team configurations, and even the exact number of ships on each team. Unbalanced teams are allowed. The game also has three basic game modes, which may occur with any of the battle types. Standard battles, a classic game mode involving teams, each with their own base; Domination, which features several key areas on the map that grant points when captured; Arms Race, which focuses on improving the characteristics of the player's ships by capturing key areas;

The game features combat missions, challenges, campaigns and collections for the sake of creating extra goals, rewards and a meaningful progression for players during their time with the game. These systems also give an opportunity of creating stories inside or outside the military or historical genres. Some special Halloween, April Fools, and other holiday battle modes appear in the game. The secondary goal of the "holiday modes" is to test new game mechanics. Temporary anime tie-in events have occurred, featuring ships and characters (as ship commanders) from High School Fleet, Azur Lane, Arpeggio of Blue Steel, and Blue Archive. Other tie-in IPs include Warhammer 40K, Transformers, Teenage Mutant Ninja Turtles, Star Trek, and more. Other events have used science-fiction-themed ships and environments, but not tied to a specific franchise. Battles take place on a limited number of specific maps, each depicting a certain location with different geographical layouts, usually featuring numerous islands of varying size that influence play. Most maps have a static or dynamic weather system to make battles more diverse. Moreover, some maps are unique for a certain game mode, e.g. PvE scenario battles based on historical events such as the Dunkirk evacuation.

Scenarios is a PvE game mode where players cooperate and complete tasks. They include a number of operations, each with separate stories, objectives, secondary objectives and rewards. Tasks include not only destroying enemy vessels but also bombarding shore installations, escorting convoys, or preventing enemy vessels from entering or escaping certain areas. To finish the scenario, players need to team up and complete the primary objective. On completion of the secondary objectives, they receive an additional star. In addition to Ranked Battles, Clan battles were introduced as another competitive mode that is played in the season format. Players can only participate in Clan Battles as a team, as opposed to Ranked battles where individual players compete against each other. A clan is a group of "teamed" players who either apply or are invited. Also, a bonus resource, oil, can be awarded and contributed to the clan. The commanders (owners) of the group can use this to build and upgrade fleet buildings, which give bonuses to every player in the clan.

=== Ship types ===
The warships presented in the game cover periods from the early 20th century, from the dawn of dreadnought battleships to the 1950s (prior to the proliferation of guided missiles), including many ships that were planned but never put into production in real life. The game features navies of major maritime powers including the United States Navy, the Imperial Japanese Navy, the United Kingdom's Royal Navy, the French Marine Nationale, the Imperial German Navy (later Kriegsmarine), the Italian Regia Marina and the Imperial Russian Navy (later the Red Fleet). Dutch, Commonwealth (Canadian, Australian, New Zealand and Indian), Spanish, and other smaller European navies (including Swedish, Polish, Greek and Turkish) are also represented, along with a Pan-Asian tree featuring ships from various East Asian (Chinese, Taiwanese and South Korean) and Southeast Asian (Thai, Indonesian and Malaysian) navies, and a Pan-American nation featuring ships from the navies of the Latin American countries (such as Brazil, Argentina, Peru and Mexico).

The game originally had four different types of ships that each offer their own style of play: battleships, cruisers, destroyers, and aircraft carriers. Submarines were also permanently added to the game with the release of Update 11.9. Battleships are heavily armoured with the most hit points and their main guns can deal significant shell damage with each volley, but they are slow, difficult to maneuver and take a long time to reload, and can be divided further into true battleships, battlecruisers and some aircraft cruisers. Destroyers are fast and agile with rapid guns, but are weaker in both gun damage and hit points, and have to rely more on torpedoes against larger ships. Cruisers have aptitudes halfway between the formers, being faster than battleships and stronger than destroyers, and they can be further split up into light and heavy cruisers. Aircraft carriers have large hit points but are slow and mediocorely armoured, but can launch airstrikes beyond other ships' gun ranges using carrier-based aircraft. Submarines are the weakest vessels armour-wise and with only moderate speeds, but can use homing torpedoes, as well as much more potent unguided torpedoes and remain submerged (and largely undetectable to large ships) for a limited amount of time, although they are vulnerable to ship- or aircraft-deployed depth charges. Some ships can launch spotter aircraft that increase their observation range as well as drop depth charges on submarines within a designated zone. All surface combatants (i.e. excluding submarines when submerged) have automated anti-aircraft batteries that can shoot down approaching enemy aircraft, and have rapid-firing secondary guns that autonomously attack any nearby enemy ships.

For practical purposes, each ship is placed in a tier system to facilitate balanced matchmaking. There are ten tiers for each ship: Tier I is the lowest and Tier X is the highest; however, some tech trees have additional "superships" - denoted by a star - as one last progression after Tier X. With a few exceptions, each nation has a tech tree; smaller navies with one branch and larger navies with branches for each type and a ship of each type at most tiers. In some cases branches split, such as into heavy and light cruisers. The lowest tier for each tech tree ship type also varies: cruisers at Tier I, destroyers at Tier II, battleships at Tier III (the sole exception being Tier II Japanese battleship Mikasa), aircraft carriers at Tier IV and submarines at tier VI. There are also premium ships that are outside the tech tree; these are available for cash and/or in-game resources. Tier I is essentially a tutorial mode; only one ship of each navy is available in the game at that tier. These ships are classed as cruisers in the game, but historically some were classed as gunboats, avisos, or frigates, and all are from the WWII era. They feature a small number of 102mm to 152mm guns and relatively slow speed. Tier I is unique in that no other tiers are included in their matchmaking, with no other offensive capabilities outside of their main batteries. Tiers II through X include ships of increasing combat capability, generally following the chronological development of each ship type in each navy, beginning circa 1905–1910 and ending in the 1950s. Ships whose construction were never completed or even begun, also called "paper ships", are used to fill gaps in the tech tree and explore hypothetical developments. Most Tier X ships, most Russian and French ships, and all of the German and Soviet aircraft carriers (Graf Zeppelin reached a late stage of construction but never entered service) are in this category.

Players can progress through the game via the research and purchase of ships from each tier. Each specific ship has a number of modules that can be accessed through experience. This experience is used to unlock modules, which can then be purchased with credits and mounted. Once a ship's modules are completely researched (credit purchase is not required), the player can acquire the next ship in the tree by spending experience and credits. The previous ship, if fully upgraded, gains "Elite" status, meaning all of its subsequently earned experience can be converted to free experience by spending doubloons (which are primarily acquired via cash purchases). On any ship, warship elements such as commanders with skill trees and unique perks can be customized, as well as modification kits and consumables such as signals and ship camouflage.

== Soundtrack and audio design ==
The soundtrack of World of Warships was composed and directed by Artur Tokhtash, Lead Composer and Audio Director at Wargaming Saint Petersburg. Tokhtash developed a distinctive sonic language for the game, blending orchestral, ambient, and electronic styles into a dynamic and immersive soundscape. A hallmark of his work on World of Warships is the reinterpretation of traditional folk melodies from various maritime cultures. Rather than quoting them directly, he transformed these themes into flexible, player-responsive compositions that resonate with contemporary musical sensibilities. One notable example is "Ev Chistr’ta, Laou!" — a modern reimagining of a Breton folk song, infused with bass-driven electronic textures while retaining the emotional essence of the original.

Many tracks within the game’s score explore hybrid sound design, layered symbolism, and the integration of acoustic and electronic textures. Critics and fans have noted Tokhtash’s ability to introduce “never-before-heard” musical forms into the gaming soundscape, enriching the emotional depth of naval gameplay.

== Release ==
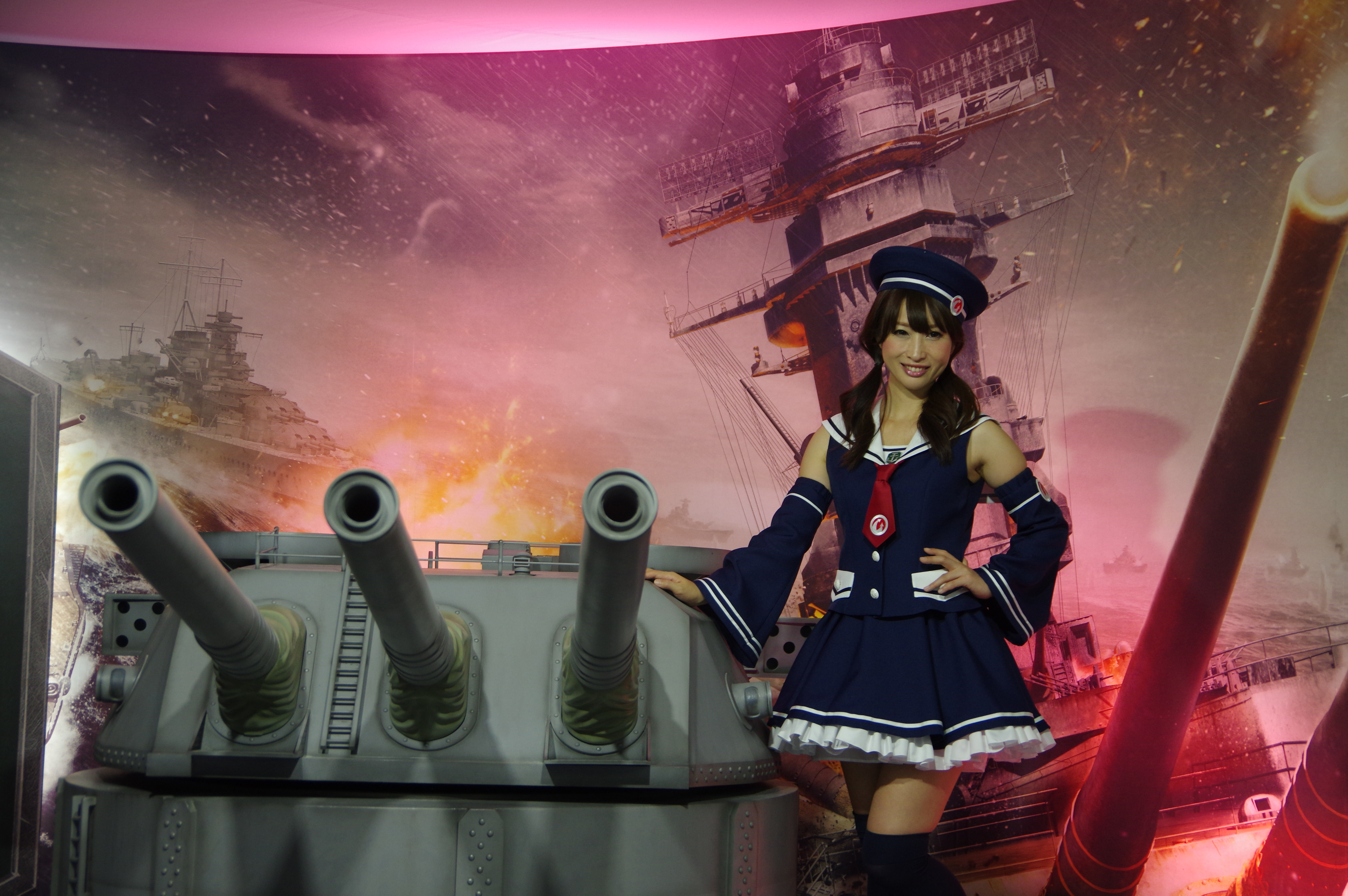
World of Warships at TGS 2014

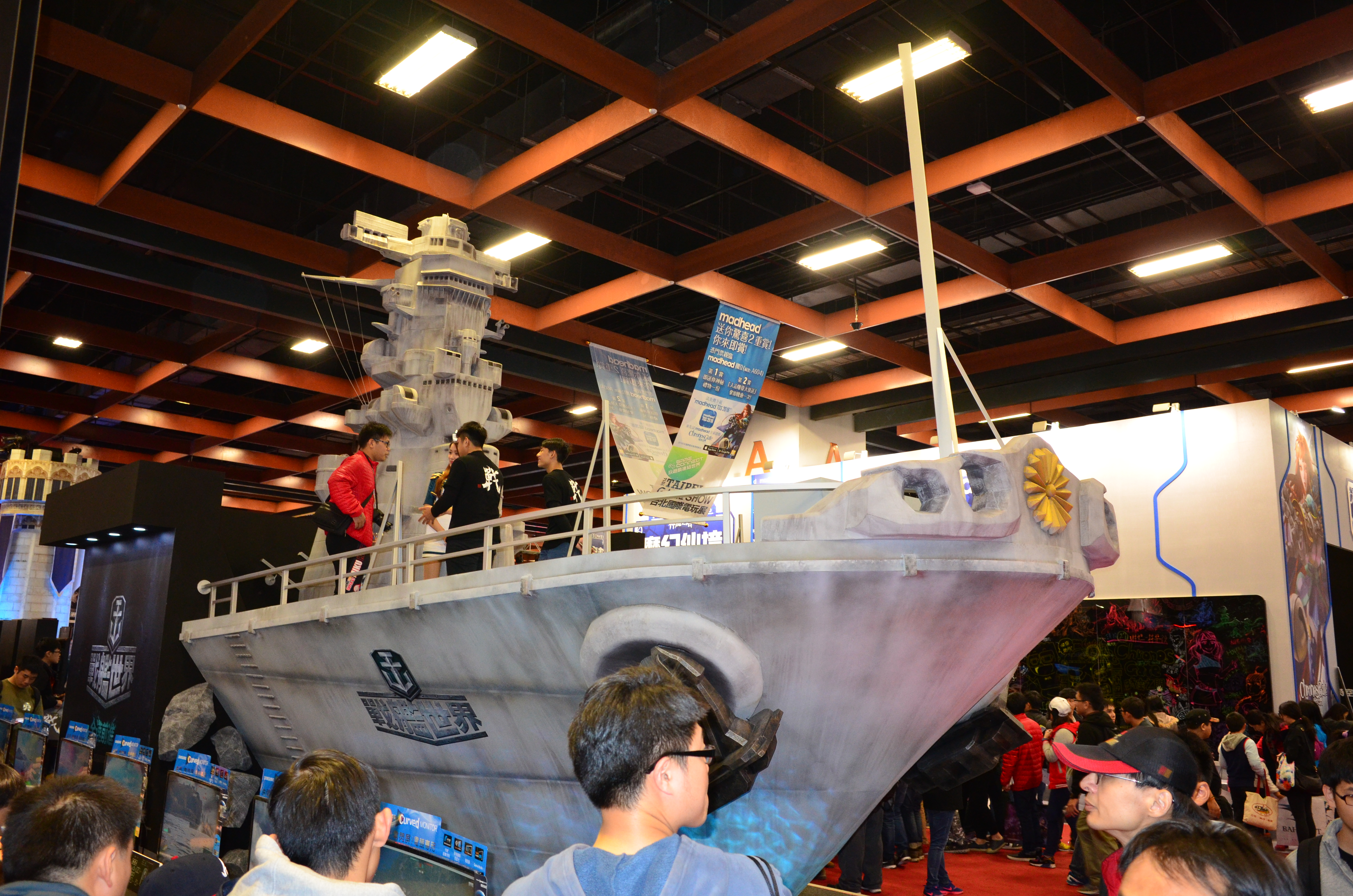
World of Warships booth at the 2016 Taipei Game Show

On August 16, 2011, the company website of Wargaming, developer and publisher of World of Tanks and World of Warplanes, announced World of Battleships, a free-to-play naval action MMO, intended to complete the World of war trilogy developed by the company. On August 2, 2012, the game was renamed World of Warships. After a petition opened by South Korean players was signed 40,000 times, Wargaming removed the Rising Sun Flag from Imperial Japanese warships in July 2013. After that, more than 12,000 signatures were gathered requesting reimplementation of the Rising Sun Flag, but the decision was not overturned. On November 14, 2013, the game entered closed alpha testing.

Closed beta testing for World of Warships started on March 12, 2015, shortly after closed alpha ended, with the non-disclosure agreement covering the alpha being lifted at the same time. On April 9, 2015, pre-order packages consisting of premium warships and access to the closed beta test became available for purchase by players. Open beta testing for World of Warships started on July 2, 2015, as the final step prior to the game's formal launch. As of the open beta test, approximately 85% of the core game development had been completed and there were future plans to introduce weather effects and night battle after the game's official release. On September 3, 2015, Wargaming announced that the game had exited open beta. The game was officially launched on September 17, 2015, and later released through Steam and the Microsoft Store on November 15, 2017.

An iOS and Android version titled World of Warships Blitz was released by Wargaming Mobile on January 18, 2018. A console version of the computer game, World of Warships: Legends, was announced on June 20, 2018, and was released in Early Access and Game Preview for the PlayStation 4 and Xbox One on April 16, 2019. World of Warships: Legends fully released on August 12, 2019. World of Warships: Legends was rebuilt to support console and mobile gameplay, sharing the same core gameplay loop of the computer version. However, it was designed to have faster-paced battles, faster progression, and had several systems revamped to fit console and mobile players. According to Malik Khatazhaev, the general manager of Lesta Studio (the branch of Wargaming that develops World of Warships), in May 2019 World of Warships' Monthly Active Users (MAU) exceeded 1,000,000 worldwide active players.

== Reception ==
Reception

Aggregate score
Aggregator	Score
Metacritic	PC: 81/100 iOS: 77/100; PS4: 83/100; XONE: 82/100

Review scores
Publication	Score
Electronic Gaming Monthly	6.5/10
GameSpot	8/10
GameStar	79/100
Hardcore Gamer	4/5
IGN	8.3/10
PC Gamer (US)	80/100
TouchArcade	4/5
The Escapist	4/5
Eurogamer Italy	9/10

World of Warships has a score of 81/100 on Metacritic. IGN awarded it a score of 8.3 out of 10, stating that the combat feels good and that the game's teamwork is satisfying. GameSpot awarded it a score of 8.0 out of 10, saying "The thrills that await, along with the promise of unlocking advanced ships down the road, make World of Warships an enticing expedition into the sometimes turbulent waters of free-to-play games." The Escapist awarded it four out of five, saying "With its tense naval battles and huge array of historical vessels, World of Warships is the free-to-play MMO that can make a wargamer out of anyone."

=== Awards ===
Awards and nominations of World of Warships
Year	Award	Nomination	Result	Source
2014	4Gamer.net Rookie Silver	Excellence Award	Won	
2014	Gamescom Award	Best Simulation Game of the Year	Nominated	
2014	IgroMir Awards	Discovery of the Show	Won	
2014	IgroMir Awards	Best Online Tactical Shooter	Won	
2016	British Academy Games Awards	Best Multiplayer Game of the Year	Nominated	
2016	Golden Joystick Awards	Best PC Game of the Year	Nominated	
2016	Golden Joystick Awards	Multiplayer Game of the Year	Nominated	
