= The Entente: Battlefields WW1 =

2003 video game

- Developer(s): Lesta Studio
- Publisher(s): CIS: Buka Entertainment; NA: Encore, Inc.
- Platform(s): Microsoft Windows
- Release: CIS: 13 August 2003; NA: 4 February 2004
- Genre(s): Real-time strategy
- Mode(s): Single-player, multiplayer

The Entente: Battlefields WW1 (Russian: Антанта, romanized: Antanta; also known as World War I: The Great War) is a real-time strategy video game developed by Lesta Studio and published in 2003 by Buka Entertainment. A Western version was released by Encore, Inc. in 2004. It simulates World War I from the perspective of the five main combatants: Russia, France, Germany, Britain and the Austrian-Hungarian Empire, focusing on economy and military paths to victory.

Reception

Aggregate score
Aggregator	Score
Metacritic	57/100

Review scores
Publication	Score
GameSpot	4.8/10
IGN	6.4/10
Jeuxvideo.com	8/20
PC Games (DE)	7/10
PC Zone	3.9/10
