= Order of War =

2009 video game

- Developer: Wargaming
- Publisher: Square Enix
- Composer: Jeremy Soule
- Platform: Windows
- Release: AU: September 17, 2009; EU: September 18, 2009; NA: September 22, 2009
- Genre: Strategy
- Modes: Single-player, multiplayer

Order of War (Russian: Order of War: Освобождение) is a World War II strategy video game developed by Wargaming and published by Square Enix. It was released exclusively for Windows in September 2009.

== Story ==
In the summer of 1944, World War II entered its end-game when the Allies launched two major operations that would drive back German forces on both the Western and Eastern Fronts at once. Order of War contains two campaigns, one American and one German. Order of War allows players to lead American forces to victory in the west and also places players in command of the German forces charged with repelling the Red Army's offensive in the east.

== Gameplay ==
Order of War features detailed graphics and a historically accurate storyline. The main focus of the game that sets it apart from other strategy offers is the sweeping scale of battlefield vistas featuring company level engagements. Players take command of multiple unit types, including ground troops, artillery, tanks and aircraft in strategic assaults based on key missions and operations from 1944. Order of War is a Real Time Strategy (RTS) game without requiring the player to manage traditional base building or resource collection activities. Much like the Relic Entertainment's Warhammer 40,000: Dawn of War series or the subsequent Company of Heroes, Order of War rewards players with reinforcement points over time for capturing command points that are spread out across the map. However, utilization of these points is similar to World in Conflict and Blitzkrieg.

== Features ==
- The game can be presented in a cinematic style, showing the intensity and scale of the battlefield as well as providing a dynamic camera that allows players to command troops over a large geographical scale whilst maintaining movie-like vistas and detail.
- Players can take command of an entire armoured force consisting of up to 1000 soldiers, tanks, armoured vehicles and air force.
- Players can choose between two campaign modes offering different storyline, missions, objectives and environments.
- Gameplay modes include 2 x different campaign modes, multi-player, deathmatch and skirmish mode.

== Reception ==
Reception

Aggregate score
Aggregator	Score
Metacritic	69/100

The game has received a mixed reception with a Metacritic score of 69/100 based on 39 critical reviews.

== Expansion ==
Released on October 10, 2010, Order of War: Challenge was mostly a multi-player extension, only its specific tutorials worked in single-player mode. This additional content required continued access to special servers for continuous DRM validation and play. The expansion was moderately well reviewed with a Metacritic score around 70. Square Enix announced in September 2013 that it was shutting down the Challenge servers due to the low popularity of the game. After these servers were shut down, Challenge became unplayable (both in a legal and technical fashion) and was completely removed from Steam, including from the on-disk libraries of users that already had purchased licenses for it. While other games have been removed from Steam's distribution channel before, Challenge has the dubious distinction of being the first game to be removed not just from the Steam store, but also automatically wiped from the disks I of its users, while most other games were merely delisted from the store. The fact that Challenge was removed from the Steam users' game libraries in addition to being unavailable to purchase has led to concerns about digital ownership and sometimes even Square Enix being criticized by its users for the practice.
