= Massive Assault =

2003 video game

- Developer(s): Wargaming
- Publisher(s): Matrix Games (Windows), Virtual Programming (Mac OS X)
- Series: Massive Assault
- Platform(s): Microsoft Windows, MacOS
- Release: 2003 (Windows), 2004 (Mac OS X)
- Genre(s): Turn-based strategy
- Mode(s): Single player, PBEM

Massive Assault is a turn-based, computer wargame by Wargaming. Despite featuring 3D graphics, the game is similar to tabletop wargames in that its gameplay is governed by simple rules and takes place on a hexagonal grid. The game's opposing forces are made up of largely equivalent units. Gameplay is made somewhat more complex by the addition of "secret allies," the disclosure of which can change the course of a game.

== Playable sides ==
The game's factions include two main opposing forces: the heroic Free Nations Union, comparable to the UN, and the villainous Phantom League, a group of military organizations and corporations working together in secret. The units employed by each side are equivalent, without significant tactical differences. However, though both sides may select from a similar pool of units, the game's rules permit a wide range of strategies and opponents need not select similar strategies.

== Planets, Countries, and Alliances ==
Players may select any of six geography types, varying from frozen, snowbound landscapes to tropical paradises. Each map features at least ten countries, with at least four allies for each of the two opponents. Countries are divided up into three categories: Undisclosed (secret) Ally, Disclosed Ally, and True Neutral. Since neither side discloses all their allies at once, players face the challenge of deciding where to place troops in a shifting geopolitical battlefield.

== Massive Assault series ==
Other games in the Massive Assault line include:

- Massive Assault Network (2004)
- Domination (AKA Massive Assault: Phantom Renaissance) (2005)
- Massive Assault Network 2 (2006)
