= World of Tanks =

2010 video game

- Developer: Wargaming
- Publisher: Wargaming
- Composer: Inon Zur (Note: Additional music by Sergey Khmelevsky)
- Platforms: Microsoft Windows, Xbox 360, Xbox One, PlayStation 4, iOS, Android, macOS, Nintendo Switch, PlayStation 5
- Release: 12 August 2010: Microsoft Windows; CIS: 12 August 2010; WW: 12 April 2011 (digital); NA: 6 September 2011; EU: 2 December 2011 Xbox 360; 12 February 2014; Xbox One; 28 July 2015; PlayStation 4; 19 January 2016; Nintendo Switch; 26 August 2020; PlayStation 5; 26 October 2021
- Genres: Vehicular combat, massively multiplayer online
- Mode: Multiplayer

World of Tanks (WoT) is an armoured warfare-themed multiplayer online game developed by Wargaming, featuring 20th century (1910s–1970s) era combat vehicles. It is built upon a freemium business model where the game is free-to-play, but participants also have the option of paying a fee for use of "premium" features. The focus is on player vs. player gameplay with each player controlling an armored vehicle, from the interwar period to the Cold War era.

World of Tanks has been ported to multiple gaming consoles. The PlayStation 4, Xbox 360 and Xbox One version, called World of Tanks: Modern Armor (formerly World of Tanks: Valor), was developed by studio Wargaming West. World of Tanks has also expanded to mobile platforms under the title World of Tanks Blitz, in addition to a board game titled World of Tanks Rush and a collectible card game titled World of Tanks: Generals. World of Tanks was followed by World of Warplanes and World of Warships.

== Gameplay ==
The player takes control of a single armored tank or self-propelled artillery vehicle of their choice and is placed into a battle on a random map. The player has control over the vehicle's movement, firing, and can communicate with allied players and all the other players through typed or voice chat. A simple random match is won either by destroying all vehicles on the opposing team or capturing the opposing team's base by staying in it for long enough without being damaged by another tank. There are other game modes that change the rules of the battle, but gameplay mechanics remain the same. World of Tanks contains multiple game mechanics such as camouflage, shell ricochets, and module and personnel damage.

The players in World of Tanks can choose six primary types of battles: random battles, team-training battles, tank-company battles, team battles, stronghold battles and special battles. Historical Battle and Rampage are former options but have since been taken down for improvement due to poor reception following their releases. Within random battles, players can also participate in platoons, groups of two or three players who are put into the same team. There are also missions to be completed in the game modes for varying amounts of rewards. A random battle includes up to 15v15 players; bots may be used to fill gaps.

=== Vehicles ===
The vehicles were originally modeled to closely resemble their counterparts in real life;, though latterly models introduced have been based on prototypes, blueprints, or projects for vehicles that did not reach production. In most cases, certain parameters have been simplified or modified to fit game mechanics, and also better gameplay. World of Tanks has five different types of vehicles: light tanks, medium tanks, heavy tanks, tank destroyers, and self-propelled artillery. The game currently includes over 600 armored vehicles from Britain, China, Czechoslovakia, France, Germany, Italy, Japan, Poland, the Soviet Union, Sweden, and the United States. Each nation has a tech tree with at least one branch of vehicles ranging from tier I (lowest) to tier X, with all but Italy hosting at least one Tier XI tank, as of the World of Tanks Update 2.0; players progress by playing games in vehicles in a branch. Additional premium and collectors' vehicles are available outside the tech trees for cash or in-game credits.

All vehicles can be customized to a certain degree, either visually or in terms of performance, with the majority of parts (such as tracks, guns, turrets, and engines) being modular parts purchased from the game's tech tree. Various two-tone and three-tone camouflage schemes are available for all tanks as well, including both historically accurate patterns and game-specific, custom variants. Camouflage is available for temporary use by paying with freely earned in-game credits, or for permanent use by paying with gold purchased in the World of Tanks store or won in an in-game event. Players can apply national flags, pre-designed slogans, and camouflage (that will slightly increase the chance of remaining undetected).

All higher tier vehicles can mount three consumables and three pieces of additional equipment, which vary from vehicle to vehicle, and offer various advantages. Some equipment allow the gun to fire faster, some increase the durability of certain parts of the vehicle, and some help keep the vehicle hidden while stationary. Examples of equipment include: repair kits, medical kits, fire extinguishers, or nation-specific extra rations that boost the performance of the tank's crew for the duration of a single battle.

=== Clan Wars ===
Clan Wars in World of Tanks has two main components: Strongholds and the Global Map. Each clan can have its own stronghold, if the clan's commander wishes to construct one. Each stronghold begins with one zone and can grow to up to four zones as the clan's membership increases. Many different types of structures exist; however, only one of each can be built. By consuming industrial resources, some structures generate special missions or reserves that can be used to temporarily boost clan members' experience or credits or enable artillery or airstrikes during a battle for a stronghold. To build structures, industrial resources are required, which can be won by attacking another stronghold or through skirmishes.

The Global Map is a collection of fronts on a map based on the real world. There are three fronts, one each for tiers 6, 8, and 10. Each front has provinces that generate gold for the clan that currently owns it. A clan may enter the global map by entering a tournament for a specific province, in which they compete against other clans and ultimately the current landowner.

== History ==
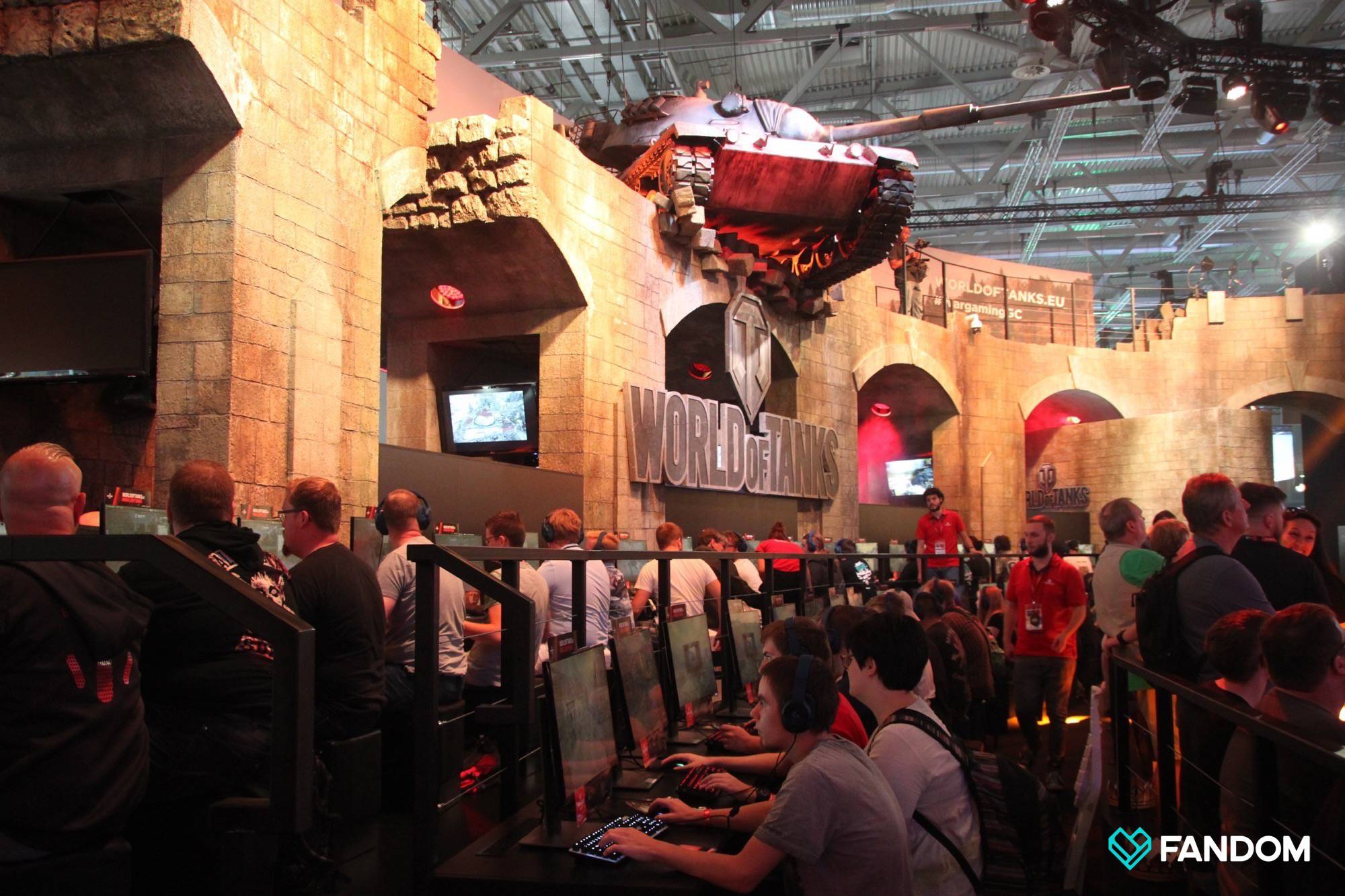
World of Tanks play area at Gamescom 2017

The developers thought of the concept of World of Tanks in December 2008. The game was officially announced by Wargaming on 24 April 2009. Developers claim that the game budget was the largest ever in the game industry of the CIS.

Alpha testing of the Russian version of the game began September 2009, with only six different vehicles and a single map available. By the beginning of the closed beta test, which started on 30 January 2010, several dozen vehicles and three maps were completed. In three months, the number of beta tester requests approached 40,000, and over 400,000 tank battles took place. Open beta test of the Russian version started 24 June 2010; at that point, there were seven maps available, along with over 60 Russian and German vehicles. Closed beta test of English version of the game began on 8 July 2010. The Russian version of the game was officially released on 12 August 2010; however, due to technical difficulties, the game servers went offline on 13 August.

The open beta of the English version of the game was launched on 27 January 2011; the official release was scheduled for 12 April 2011. The World of Tanks pre-orders were scheduled to be available for the American and European clusters before the game release.

World of Tanks was released online on 12 April 2011 in Europe and North America, before being released for retail in the latter on 6 September 2011, and in the former on 2 December 2011. The game was localised into the Japanese language within the Asia server on 5 September 2013. The Vietnamese server was shut down and merged into the Asia server during 2014.

=== Promotion and other media ===
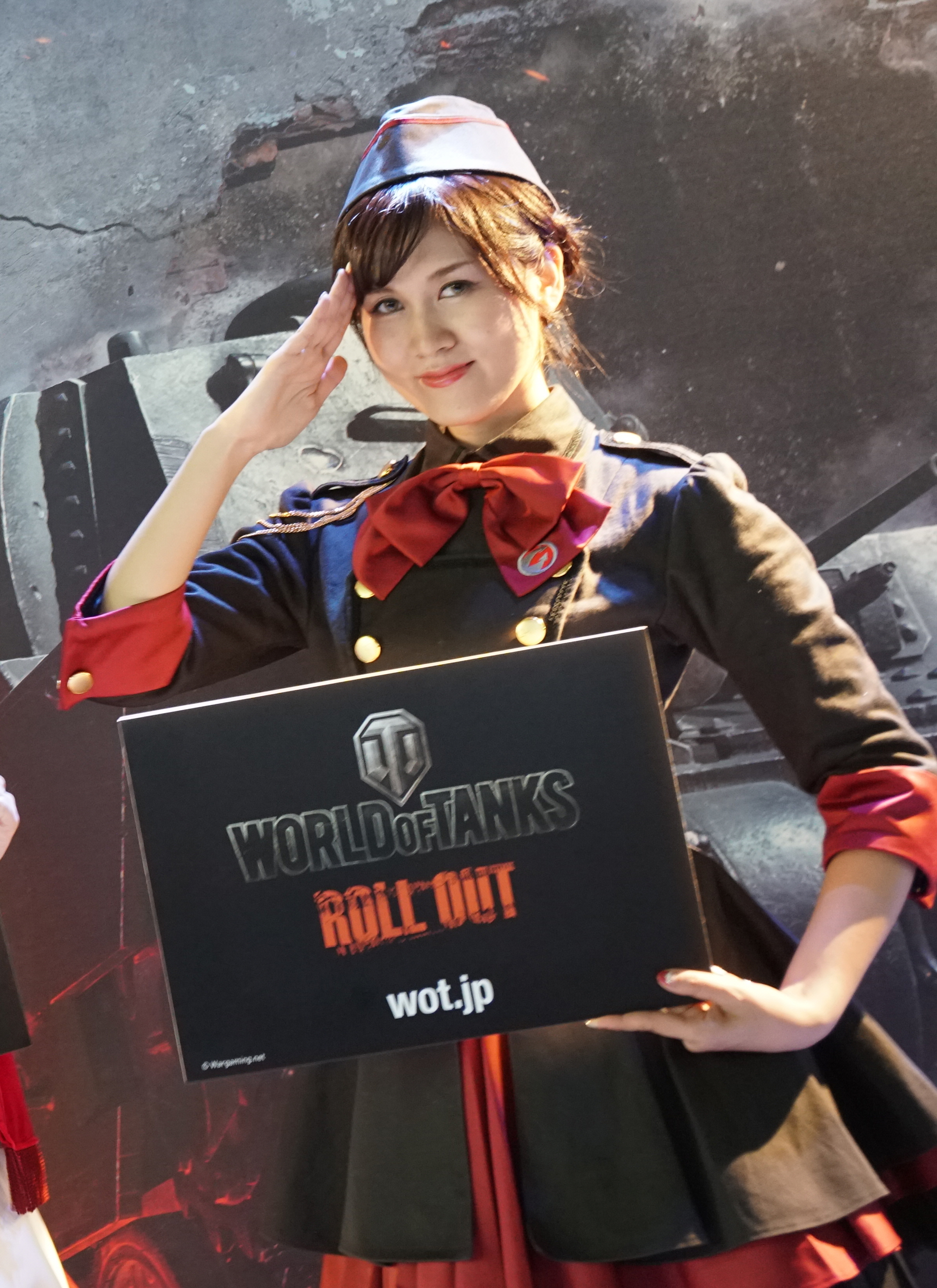
Promotion of World of Tanks: Roll Out at Tokyo Game Show 2017

In April 2016, Wargaming announced that a comic book based on the World of Tanks universe was in development. Titled World of Tanks: Roll Out, the five-issue series was written by Garth Ennis and Carlos Ezquerra and was published by Dark Horse Comics.

The Japanese version has collaboration events related to the tank-battle anime series Girls und Panzer; by 2021 these events were extended to the other languages and servers. As of June 2017, Wargaming released two premium tanks based on the anime series Valkyria Chronicles on the East Asia server. Six voice packs featuring the characters from the anime and an expansion pack changing the tanks' look have also been released. In August 2017, Wargaming and World of Tanks announced a collaboration with the Swedish metal band Sabaton, shooting a World of Tanks drive-style video for Sabaton's song "Primo Victoria", and adding a tank named "Primo Victoria" to the game. This featured the Sabaton logo, with its crew having the visual likenesses of Sabaton members, and lead singer Joakim Brodén voicing the captain of the tank.

In July 2020, the console version partnered with the WWE to produce in-game content, such as vehicles, related to various WWE wrestlers, such as Becky Lynch, Stone Cold Steve Austin, Sgt. Slaughter, and others. Later that year, this version also partnered with Mattel, makers of the Hot Wheels brand to create various Hot Wheels-themed content.

World of Tanks console and PC both collaborated with the makers of G.I. Joe to release in-game cosmetics that would make certain tanks resemble GI Joe vehicles, and exclusively on console, a playable version of two armored fighting vehicles from the G.I. Joe: A Real American Hero series, the M.O.B.A.T. and the H.I.S.S.

=== World of Tanks Blitz ===
In March 2013, Wargaming announced World of Tanks Blitz, a mobile version of World of Tanks for tablets and smartphones using Windows 10, Android and iOS. The game allows 7v7 battles, as compared to the 15v15 battles on PC. The Closed Beta Test (CBT) started on 19 March and ended 3 April. World of Tanks Blitz was released (on iOS only) in May 2014 in European countries like Norway, Sweden, Finland, Denmark, and Iceland, with all other countries, at the time, awaiting launch. It was released on 27 June 2014 in North America (again, on iOS only). Beta testing of the Android version was released in Russia, with World of Tanks Blitz being released worldwide later on 4 December 2014.

The game was released in the Windows Store on 28 December 2015, making it available for PC users running Windows 10. On 9 November 2016, World of Tanks Blitz was released on Steam.

=== Console versions ===
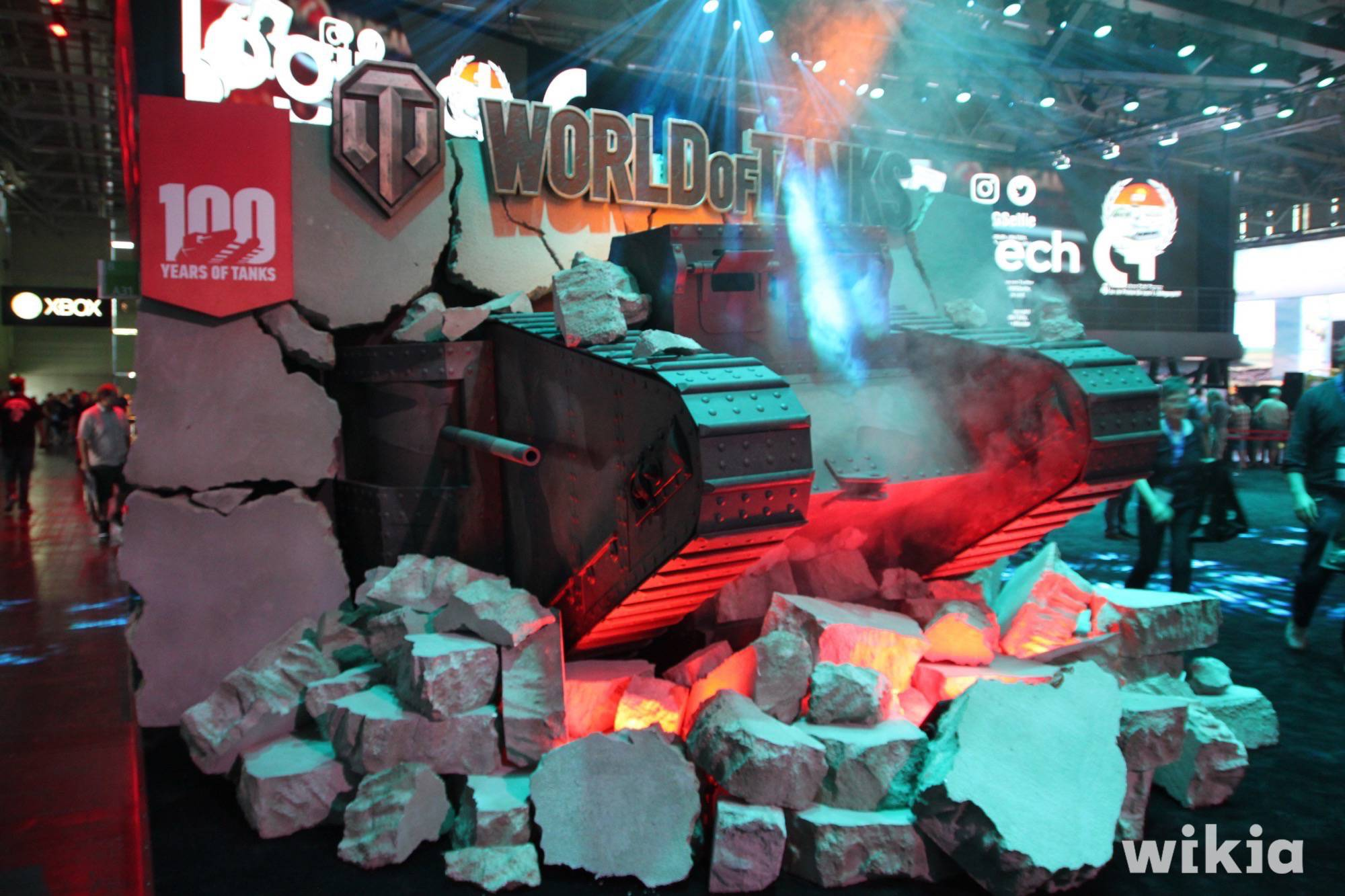
World of Tanks at Gamescom 2016

World of Tanks: Xbox 360 Edition was developed with Wargaming West, formerly Day 1 Studios until purchased early in 2013. Day 1 was looking for a publisher for their console mech game when Wargaming asked the studio about porting World of Tanks. Day 1 prototyped the game on the Xbox 360 "in mere days". They were given unrestricted access to Wargaming's servers and art. The game's client side runs on Wargaming's Despair engine. The company aimed to give each tank class 100 hours of unlockable content, or 400 to 500 hours overall.

The version is free-to-play for Xbox Live Gold subscribers, and includes a 7-day trial for Xbox Live Silver subscribers. Playing the game earns experience for tanks and accessories, and silver for buying tanks and equipment. Players can use gold, an in-game currency, to buy premium World of Tanks accounts, which in turn give players more experience and credits faster. Players can buy gold with real money in the later patches. Gold for premium accounts and tanks is the fastest method for progressing through the game. The Xbox 360 Edition is not connected with the PC game, with a separate user base and no crossplay.

A closed beta test began in early 2013, and E3 2013 attendees were invited to the beta after the game's announcement. The game was working on retail Xbox 360s by mid-May 2013. In late May 2013, Wargaming announced that they would be showing its first console game at E3 2013. The game was officially announced during Microsoft's E3 2013 press event. An open beta with 40 American and German tanks was scheduled to begin the weekend after E3 2013. The beta was for stress testing the servers and multiplayer matchmaking. Players could not buy gold in the open beta, but Wargaming provided free in-game gold to test the store, though this reset with the official release. British tanks were also available within the beta. About 60 total tanks were expected to be included in the full version. The open beta was released on 7 August 2013. The beta closed on 28 January 2014. All stats on all of the players who participated were reset. The people who participated in the beta got the game first when the full version came out on 12 February 2014.

On 18 February 2015, Wargaming announced that they were developing an Xbox One version of the game. The game was released on 28 July 2015. It supports cross-platform play between Xbox 360 and Xbox One. Players' status and progress can be transferred from the Xbox 360 version to the Xbox One version. Xbox Live regulations bar Wargaming from offering premium accounts as recurring subscriptions. Expansion released on 3 June 2014 includes Russian tanks. Wargaming West said that if the Xbox 360 version gets a "meaningful user base" then they will focus on the Xbox One edition.

On 17 September 2015, Wargaming announced at the Tokyo Game Show that World of Tanks would be coming to the PlayStation 4, developed by Wargaming West, the same studio as the Xbox One and Xbox 360 versions. The PlayStation 4 version was released in 2016.

On 21 July 2020 at 00:00 UTC, the Xbox 360 version of the game was shut down and support ceased, making the game no longer playable. Accounts and progress on the Xbox 360 game can be transferred to the Xbox One version.

== Esports ==
World of Tanks debuted as an esports game at the World Cyber Games 2012. The only official World of Tanks e-sports tournament is the Wargaming.net League, which takes place on four different regions: CIS, APAC, EU, which have 12 teams each, and NA, which only has 10. The prize pool for the 2016 WGL Grand Finals was US$300,000.

== Reception ==
=== Critical response ===
Reception

Aggregate score
Aggregator	Score				
Aggregator	iOS	PC	PS4	Xbox 360	Xbox One
Metacritic	83/100	80/100	80/100	77/100	76/100

Review scores
Publication	Score				
Publication	iOS	PC	PS4	Xbox 360	Xbox One
Destructoid	N/A	N/A	N/A	N/A	6/10
Electronic Gaming Monthly	N/A	N/A	N/A	N/A	8/10
Eurogamer	N/A	8/10	N/A	7/10	N/A
Famitsu	N/A	N/A	N/A	28/40	N/A
GamePro	N/A	5/5	N/A	N/A	N/A
GameRevolution	N/A	N/A	4.5/5	4/5	N/A
GamesMaster	80%	80%	N/A	N/A	N/A
GameSpot	N/A	8/10	N/A	8/10	N/A
GameSpy	N/A	3/5	N/A	N/A	N/A
GameTrailers	N/A	8.1/10	N/A	N/A	N/A
IGN	N/A	7.5/10	N/A	8/10	N/A
Official Xbox Magazine (UK)	N/A	N/A	N/A	7/10	N/A
PC Gamer (UK)	N/A	85%	N/A	N/A	N/A
TouchArcade	4.5/5	N/A	N/A	N/A	N/A
USgamer	N/A	N/A	N/A	N/A	4/5
Common Sense Media	N/A	4/5	N/A	N/A	N/A

Awards
Publication	Award
Golden Joystick Awards 2018	"Still Playing"
Golden Joystick Awards 2017	"Still Playing"
Golden Joystick Awards 2013	"Best Online Game"
17th Annual D.I.C.E. Awards	"Online Game of the Year"
Golden Joystick Awards 2012	"Best MMO"
MMOSITE's Reader's Choice Awards 2010	"Most Anticipated MMO in 2010"
KRI 2010	"Best Online Client Game"
E3 2010	"Best New Concept"

World of Tanks (and the iOS version of World of Tanks Blitz) received "generally favorable reviews" on all platforms according to the review aggregation website Metacritic. GameZone gave the PC version a score of eight out of ten and stated, "For a free-to-play game, World of Tanks is insanely detailed and has combat that takes a while to get used to. The more you learn about the game and the more you play, the better you'll become at it. It's like an investment—spend time playing and you'll be able to upgrade more and compete better. In that sense, the game really drives you towards becoming better. Since it's free, it doesn't hurt to try this game out if you haven't already. Just make sure you get past the growing pains and give it a chance, because it really does have a lot to offer." In Japan, Famitsu gave the Xbox 360 version a score of one eight, one six, and two sevens for a total of 28 out of 40.

=== Userbase ===
According to a Wargaming official press release from September 2010, the number of World of Tanks users worldwide reached 700,000, including 500,000 users on Russian servers (350,000 active players), and 200,000 on Western servers (150,000 active players). The number of peak concurrent users exceeded 43,000 on Russian servers and 10,000 on Western servers. The average active gamer spent 3 hours 20 minutes playing the game every day; over 10,000,000 battles have been fought since September 2010. By January 2011, World of Tanks had recorded more than one million registrations worldwide (Europe, Russia and the United States). This milestone was reached in less than a year since the launch of the closed beta in Russia.

On 5 January 2011 there were 74,536 players simultaneously online on the Russian World of Tanks server, which, according to Wargaming, had become a world record amongst MMO games. The "Most players online simultaneously on one MMO server" world record was officially registered by Guinness World Records on 23 January 2011 and constituted 91,311 players. On 24 May 2011 total number of registrations for all three game servers reached 3 million players (2 million on Russian server and 1 million on Europe and North America).

As of December 2013, the game has 75 million registered players worldwide and a 1.1 million peak concurrent players. This is an increase of 15 million over the 60 million in June 2013 and 30 million over the 45 million in December 2012. In June 2013, Wargaming stated that they now have 60 million registered users for World of Tanks.

The game has proven popular with Ukrainian soldiers in the Russian invasion of Ukraine as a means of coping with the stresses of warfare both via dissociation and the comfort of the familiar, many having been long-time fans of the franchise.

=== Revenue ===
In 2012, Wargaming's revenue was declared to be 217.9 million euro, with net profit of 6.1 million euro, as declared in an annual report for the Cyprus Stock Exchange. The money gained by Wargaming largely came from World of Tanks. In 2013, the microtransaction revenue of World of Tanks surpassed that of World of Warcraft, earning $372 million and ranking fourth highest amongst online game revenues.

=== Controversies ===
In May 2017, Wargaming found itself amidst controversy when it was claimed that one of its employees had threatened to file a Digital Millennium Copyright Act (DMCA) claim against YouTube gaming content creator SirFoch over his scathing review of a World of Tanks premium tank, the Chrysler K GF.

== See also ==
- War Thunder
- Armored Warfare
