= Bitsquid =

Discontinued 3D game engine

- Original authors: Niklas Frykholm, Tobias Persson
- Developers: Bitsquid AB (2010–2014); Autodesk (2014–2018)
- Release: April 2010; 16 years ago
- Final release: 1.9 / August 2017; 9 years ago
- Written in: C++, Lua
- Platform: Windows, Linux, PlayStation (3, 4, 5), Xbox (360, One, X/S), iOS, Android
- License: Proprietary

Autodesk Stingray (formerly Bitsquid), is a 3D game engine with support for Windows, Linux, PlayStation 3, PlayStation 4, PlayStation 5, Xbox 360, Xbox One, Xbox Series X/S, iOS, and Android. It uses Lua as a scripting language.

== History ==
=== Bitsquid ===
Bitsquid AB, the company that created the Bitsquid game engine, was founded in 2009 in Stockholm, Sweden, by Niklas Frykholm and Tobias Persson, two engineers who formerly worked at game studio Grin, and by the owners of game developer Fatshark.

The game engine was built to be flexible and scalable, with support for visual scripting, Lua, and C++ for advanced users. The use of Lua allowed Bitsquid to be smaller and lighter than other game engines thanks to its lean code base.

In April 2010, Bitsquid and Fatshark released a demo highlighting the Bitsquid engine's abilities. PlayStation 3 and Xbox 360 support was added that fall. In 2011, Fatshark released Hamilton's Great Adventure, the first game to run on Bitsquid. In 2013, Bitsquid was made available for development in PlayStation 4 games.

Bitsquid was acquired by Autodesk in June 2014. The money from the sale helped Fatshark develop Warhammer: End Times – Vermintide, the studio's first self-published AAA game. Frykholm and Persson went on to develop a short-lived "modular" game engine named The Machinery.

=== Autodesk Stingray ===
In 2015, Bitsquid was retooled into Autodesk Stingray, which integrated with the company's game development toolchain, including 3ds Max, Maya, Mudbox, and Maya LT. Autodesk hoped to compete with other low-cost-to-enter game engines like Unreal Engine, Unity, and CryEngine. Stingray was offered on a monthly subscription basis and even packaged with some of the company's other offerings.

In June 2017, Autodesk introduced Stingray as a 3ds Max plugin named 3ds Max Interactive. This feature allowed 3ds Max users to create virtual reality experiences. In August 2017, version 1.9 was released. This was the last version before Autodesk announced Stingray's end of sale and development as a standalone product in December 2017, citing its inability to compete with Unreal Engine and Unity, and was make effective as of January 7, 2018. 3DS Max Interactive was discontinued on March 30, 2022.

On February 8, 2024, Arrowhead Game Studios released Helldivers 2, a third-person co-op shooter built in Stingray, six years after official support ended. CEO Johan Pilestedt confirmed that the game had entered production before the shutdown in 2018.

== Games using Bitsquid and Stingray ==
Bitsquid and Stingray were primarily used by Sweden-based developers, such as Fatshark and Arrowhead Game Studios. Each have used the engine in a number of their games. Games built with the engine include:

Title	Release date	Developer(s)
A Game of Dwarves	23 October 2012	Zeal Game Studio
Bloodsports.TV	30 March 2015	Fatshark, Toadman Interactive
Cobalt	2 February 2016	Oxeye Game Studio
Dreadlands	10 March 2020	Blackfox Studios AB
Escape Dead Island	18 November 2014	Fatshark
Hamilton's Great Adventure	31 May 2011	Fatshark
Immortal: Unchained	7 September 2018	Toadman Interactive
#KILLALLZOMBIES	28 October 2014	Beatshapers
Krater	12 June 2012	Fatshark
Gauntlet	23 September 2014	Arrowhead Game Studios
Helldivers	3 March 2015	Arrowhead Game Studios
Helldivers 2	8 February 2024	Arrowhead Game Studios
Magicka: Wizard Wars	27 May 2014	Paradox North AB
Magicka 2	26 May 2015	Pieces Interactive
The Showdown Effect	5 March 2013	Arrowhead Game Studios, Pixeldiet Entertainment
War of the Vikings	15 April 2014	Fatshark
War of the Roses	2 October 2012	Fatshark
Warhammer: End Times - Vermintide	23 October 2015	Fatshark
Warhammer: Vermintide 2	8 March 2018	Fatshark
Warhammer 40,000: Darktide	30 November 2022	Fatshark
