= 19th Annual D.I.C.E. Awards =

Annual award in video game industry

- Date: February 18, 2016
- Venue: Mandalay Bay Convention Center
- Country: Paradise, Nevada, USA
- Hosted by: Pete Holmes

Highlights
- Most awards: Fallout 4; Ori and the Blind Forest; Rocket League; The Witcher 3: Wild Hunt (3)
- Most nominations: Rise of the Tomb Raider (9)
- Game of the Year: Fallout 4
- Hall of Fame: Hideo Kojima
- Lifetime Achievement: Satoru Iwata

The 19th Annual D.I.C.E. Awards was the 19th edition of the D.I.C.E. Awards, an annual awards event that honored the best games in the video game industry during 2015. The awards were arranged by the Academy of Interactive Arts & Sciences (AIAS) and were held at the Mandalay Bay Convention Center in Paradise, Nevada on February 18, 2016. It was also held as part of the Academy's 2016 D.I.C.E. Summit, and was hosted by stand-up comedian Pete Holmes.

The award for "Outstanding Innovation in Gaming" was recategorized as a Special Award.

Fallout 4 won "Game of the Year", and tied with Ori and the Blind Forest, Rocket League, and The Witcher 3: Wild Hunt for winning the most awards of the ceremony. In addition, the spin-off, Fallout Shelter, also won "Mobile Game of the Year". Rise of the Tomb Raider received the most nominations. Square Enix had the most nominations as a publisher, while Sony Computer Entertainment had the most nominated games. Microsoft Studios and Bethesda Game Studios tied as the most award-winning companies and had the most award-winning games.

Hideo Kojima, known for the Metal Gear franchise, was inducted into the Academy's Hall of Fame. Satoru Iwata, the late former CEO of Nintendo, posthumously received the "Lifetime Achievement Award". The original Visual Basic received the "Technical Impact Award".

== Winners and Nominees ==
Winners are listed first, highlighted in boldface, and indicated with a double dagger (‡).

=== Game of the Year awards ===
**Game of the Year**: **Fallout 4** — **Bethesda Game Studios**‡; Bloodborne — FromSoftware, Sony Computer Entertainment; Ori and the Blind Forest — Moon Studios, Microsoft Studios; Rise of the Tomb Raider — Crystal Dynamics, Square Enix Europe; The Witcher 3: Wild Hunt — CD Projekt Red
**D.I.C.E. Sprite Award**: **Rocket League** — **Psyonix**‡; Galak-Z: The Dimensional — 17-Bit; Her Story — Sam Barlow; Kerbal Space Program — Squad; Undertale — Toby Fox	**Handheld Game of the Year**: **Helldivers** — **Arrowhead Game Studios**, **Sony Computer Entertainment**‡; Earth Defense Force 2: Invaders from Planet Space — Sandlot, D3 Publisher, Xseed Games; Pokémon Super Mystery Dungeon — Spike Chunsoft, Nintendo; Yo-kai Watch — Level-5, Nintendo
**Mobile Game of the Year**: **Fallout Shelter** — **Bethesda Game Studios**, **Behaviour Interactive**‡; DomiNations — Nexon, Big Huge Games; Lara Croft Go — Square Enix Montreal; Pac-Man 256 — Hipster Whale, Bandai Namco Entertainment; The Room Three — Fireproof Games	**Outstanding Achievement in Online Gameplay**: **Rocket League** — **Psyonix**‡; Destiny: The Taken King — Bungie, Activision; Halo 5: Guardians — 343 Industries, Microsoft Studios; Hearthstone: Heroes of Warcraft — Blizzard Entertainment; Splatoon — Nintendo EAD

=== Craft awards ===
**Outstanding Achievement in Game Direction**: **Fallout 4** — **Bethesda Game Studios**‡; Life Is Strange — Don't Nod, Square Enix Europe; Rise of the Tomb Raider — Crystal Dynamics, Square Enix Europe; Undertale — Toby Fox; The Witcher 3: Wild Hunt — CD Projekt Red	**Outstanding Achievement in Game Design**: **The Witcher 3: Wild Hunt** — **CD Projekt Red**‡; Fallout 4 — Bethesda Game Studios; Her Story — Sam Barlow; Lara Croft Go — Square Enix Montreal; Massive Chalice — Double Fine Productions
**Outstanding Achievement in Animation**: **Ori and the Blind Forest** — **Moon Studios**, **Microsoft Studios**‡; Assassin's Creed Syndicate — Ubisoft Quebec; Batman: Arkham Knight — Rocksteady Studios, Warner Bros. Interactive Entertainment; Rise of the Tomb Raider — Crystal Dynamics, Square Enix Europe; The Order: 1886 — Ready at Dawn, Sony Computer Entertainment	**Outstanding Achievement in Art Direction**: **Ori and the Blind Forest** — **Moon Studios**, **Microsoft Studios**‡; Lara Croft Go — Square Enix Montreal; Rise of the Tomb Raider — Crystal Dynamics, Square Enix Europe; Star Wars Battlefront — DICE, Electronic Arts; The Order: 1886 — Ready at Dawn, Sony Computer Entertainment
**Outstanding Achievement in Character**: **Lara Croft** **(Rise of the Tomb Raider)** — **Crystal Dynamics**, **Square Enix Europe**‡; Evie Frye (Assassin's Creed Syndicate) — Ubisoft Quebec; Hannah Smith (Her Story) — Sam Barlow; Max Caulfield (Life Is Strange) — Don't Nod, Square Enix Europe; Geralt of Rivia (The Witcher 3: Wild Hunt) — CD Projekt Red	**Outstanding Achievement in Original Music Composition**: **Ori and the Blind Forest** — **Moon Studios**, **Microsoft Studios**‡; Batman: Arkham Knight — Rocksteady Studios, Warner Bros. Interactive Entertainment; Everybody's Gone to the Rapture — The Chinese Room, Sony Computer Entertainment; StarCraft II: Legacy of the Void — Blizzard Entertainment; The Witcher 3: Wild Hunt — CD Projekt Red
**Outstanding Achievement in Sound Design**: **Star Wars Battlefront** — **DICE**, **Electronic Arts**‡; Destiny: The Taken King — Bungie, Activision; Ori and the Blind Forest — Moon Studios, Microsoft Studios; Rise of the Tomb Raider — Crystal Dynamics, Square Enix Europe; The Order: 1886 — Ready at Dawn, Sony Computer Entertainment	**Outstanding Achievement in Story**: **The Witcher 3: Wild Hunt** — **CD Projekt Red**‡; Fallout 4 — Bethesda Game Studios; Her Story — Sam Barlow; Rise of the Tomb Raider — Crystal Dynamics, Square Enix Europe; Tales from the Borderlands — Telltale Games
**Outstanding Technical Achievement**: **The Witcher 3: Wild Hunt** — **CD Projekt Red**‡; Just Cause 3 — Avalanche Software, Square Enix Europe; Rise of the Tomb Raider — Crystal Dynamics, Square Enix Europe; Star Wars Battlefront — DICE, Electronic Arts; The Order: 1886 — Ready at Dawn, Sony Computer Entertainment

=== Genre awards ===
**Action Game of the Year**: **Star Wars Battlefront** — **DICE**, **Electronic Arts**‡; Destiny: The Taken King — Bungie, Activision; Helldivers — Arrowhead Game Studios, Sony Computer Entertainment; Just Cause 3 — Avalanche Software, Square Enix Europe; Splatoon — Nintendo EAD	**Adventure Game of the Year**: **Metal Gear Solid V: The Phantom Pain** — **Kojima Productions**, **Konami**‡; Batman: Arkham Knight — Rocksteady Studios, Warner Bros. Interactive Entertainment; Life Is Strange — Don't Nod, Square Enix Europe; Ori and the Blind Forest — Moon Studios, Microsoft Studios; Rise of the Tomb Raider — Crystal Dynamics, Square Enix Europe
**Family Game of the Year**: **Super Mario Maker** — **Nintendo EAD**‡; Guitar Hero Live — FreeStyleGames, Activision; Lego Dimensions — Traveller's Tales, Warner Bros. Interactive Entertainment; Rock Band 4 — Harmonix; Tearaway Unfolded — Media Molecule, Tarsier Studios, Sony Computer Entertainment	**Fighting Game of the Year**: **Mortal Kombat X** — **NetherRealm Studios**, **Warner Bros. Interactive Entertainment**‡; Dead or Alive 5 Last Round — Team Ninja, Koei Tecmo; Rising Thunder — Radiant Entertainment, Riot Games
**Racing Game of the Year**: **Forza Motorsport 6** — **Turn 10 Studios**, **Microsoft Studios**‡; Need for Speed — Ghost Games, Electronic Arts; Project CARS — Slightly Mad Studios, Bandai Namco Entertainment	**Role-Playing/Massively Multiplayer Game of the Year**: **Fallout 4** — **Bethesda Game Studios**‡; Bloodborne — FromSoftware, Sony Computer Entertainment; Pillars of Eternity — Obsidian Entertainment, Paradox Interactive; Undertale — Toby Fox; The Witcher 3: Wild Hunt — CD Projekt Red
**Sports Game of the Year**: **Rocket League** — **Psyonix**‡; FIFA 16 — EA Canada; Madden NFL 16 — EA Tiburon; MLB 15: The Show — SCE San Diego; NBA 2K16 — Visual Concepts, 2K Games	**Strategy/Simulation Game of the Year**: **Heroes of the Storm** — **Blizzard Entertainment**‡; Cities: Skylines — Colossal Order, Paradox Interactive; Fallout Shelter — Bethesda Game Studios, Behaviour Interactive; Grey Goo — Petroglyph Games, Grey Box; Kerbal Space Program — Squad

=== Special awards ===
==== Hall of Fame ====
- Hideo Kojima

==== Lifetime Achievement ====
- Satoru Iwata

==== Technical Impact ====
- Visual Basic

=== Multiple nominations and awards ===
==== Multiple Nominations ====
Games that received multiple nominations
Nominations	Game
9	Rise of the Tomb Raider
8	The Witcher 3: Wild Hunt
6	Ori and the Blind Forest
5	Fallout 4
4	Her Story
4	Star Wars Battlefront
4	The Order: 1886
3	Batman: Arkham Knight
3	Destiny: The Taken King
3	Lara Croft Go
3	Life Is Strange
3	Rocket League
3	Undertale
2	Assassin's Creed Syndicate
2	Bloodborne
2	Fallout Shelter
2	Helldivers
2	Just Cause 3
2	Kerbal Space Program
2	Splatoon

Nominations by company
Nominations	Games	Company
17	4	Square Enix
11	6	Sony Computer Entertainment
9	1	Crystal Dynamics
8	3	Microsoft Game Studios
8	1	CD Projekt Red
7	2	Bethesda Game Studios
7	4	Electronic Arts
6	1	Moon Studios
5	4	Nintendo
5	3	Warner Bros. Interactive Entertainment
4	2	Activision
4	1	DICE
4	1	Ready at Dawn
4	1	Sam Barlow
3	3	Blizzard Entertainment
3	1	Bungie
3	1	Don't Nod
3	1	Psyonix
3	1	Rocksteady Studios
3	1	Toby Fox
2	2	Bandai Namco Entertainment
2	2	Paradox Interactive
2	1	Arrowhead Game Studios
2	1	Avalanche Software
2	1	Behaviour Interactive
2	1	FromSoftware
2	1	Squad
2	1	Ubisoft Quebec

==== Multiple awards ====
Games that received multiple awards
Awards	Game
3	Fallout 4
3	Ori and the Blind Forest
3	Rocket League
3	The Witcher 3: Wild Hunt
2	Star Wars Battlefront

Awards by company
Awards	Games	Company
4	2	Bethesda Game Studios
4	2	Microsoft Studios
3	1	CD Projekt Red
3	1	Moon Studios
3	1	Psyonix
2	1	DICE
2	1	Electronic Arts
