= Rising Thunder (video game) =

- Developer: Radiant Entertainment
- Publisher: Riot Games
- Engine: Unreal Engine 4
- Platform: Microsoft Windows
- Release: Cancelled
- Genre: Fighting
- Modes: Single-player, multiplayer

Rising Thunder was a cancelled free-to-play fighting game developed by Radiant Entertainment. Originally released in alpha state in 2015, the game closed following the acquisition of Radiant Entertainment by Riot Games. A freeware version of the game with available server source code, entitled Community Edition, was released in January 2018.

== Gameplay ==
Rising Thunder was a free-to-play fighting game that used simplified controls, in contrast to most 2D Fighting Games which utilize motion or charge commands. This was to make the game more accessible while still being deep and balanced, being capable of standing up to years of high level competitive play. There were eight buttons in total which consist of three normals, three specials, an Overdrive/Super, and a throw. Each character had a listed fighting style and level of difficulty.

The current version includes training mode, ranked match, and custom match. The game utilizes Tony Cannon's signature GGPO3 as a rollback netcode, making sure that lag does not affect the matches. The game will also auto-detect frames per second. Rising Thunder currently supports native Windows controllers (Xbox 360/Xbox One) as well as PC-compatible arcade sticks. Rising Thunder uses an Elo rating system to determine skill rating and has a level-like system for ranking tiers. The matchmaker juggles the three factors being the players skill rating, location and time spent in queue. This allows players to experience far future where robots will battle for supremacy.

== Development ==
Development team Radiant Entertainment announced that they raised $4.5 million to build PC games. Radiant mentioned that Valve's Steam platform has created a central hub for game developers to post their games, attract, and monetize users. Rising Thunder was led by former Capcom and Santa Monica Studio employee Seth Killian with assistance from EVO co-founders Tom and Tony Cannon.

The game was announced in July at Evo 2015 by Radiant Entertainment's Seth Killian. It was confirmed it would utilize Unreal Engine 4 and an updated version of GGPO titled GGPO3.

Rising Thunder had external funding and did not need to be crowdfunded. The game was also going with a free-to-play structure built around selling cosmetics rather than charging people for gameplay. It went live in the form of a "technical alpha" version roughly one week after EVO 2015. Radiant mentioned they were inspired by games like Dota 2, which led them to use the free-to-play concept that most successful eSports games use so that Rising Thunder could have a large and active player base, as well as not needing to pay at all in order to play.

On March 8, 2016, Radiant Entertainment was acquired by League of Legends developer Riot Games. The Cannon brothers Tom and Tony announced that Rising Thunder would be closing down on March 18, 2016 as well as saying that they would be focusing on a new game. On December 18, 2017, it was announced that the game would re-release as Rising Thunder: Community Edition, incorporating local multiplayer and including the server source code for networked matchmaking.

== Release ==
The game was initially released as a Technical Alpha on July 28, 2015 to a limited audience. It was eventually released to the public on August 10, 2015.

The 1292 Build fixed performance issues with the User Interface and AMD processors The 1341 Build added custom matches and lobbies, allowing people to play with friends. The last Official build was Build 1391 which had balance changes and bug fixes. Although the Community Edition has had several fixes and updates created for it, there are no build numbers attached to it, instead "Versions" are the nomenclature for these updated releases with the latest being Version 1.3.

=== Promotion ===
On September 9, 2015, well-known streamer ShowDown hosted the very first Rising Thunder tournament in San Francisco, California. Evo 2012 Ultimate Marvel vs. Capcom 3 champion, Ryan "Filipino Champ" Ramirez was the winner of ShowDown's inaugural tournament utilizing Chel.

=== Awards ===
List of awards and nominations
Award	Category	Result	Ref.
The Game Awards 2015	Best Fighting Game	Nominated	
19th Annual D.I.C.E. Awards	Fighting Game of the Year	Nominated	
