= Stonehearth =

2018 video game

- Developer: Radiant Entertainment
- Publisher: Radiant Entertainment
- Platforms: Microsoft Windows, macOS
- Release: July 25, 2018
- Genre: City-building
- Modes: Single-player, multiplayer

Stonehearth is a 2018 city-building game developed by Radiant Entertainment. After an early access phase beginning in 2015, the game was released for Microsoft Windows and macOS on July 25, 2018. A tentative port for Linux was canceled, along with several "stretch goals" from its crowdfunding campaign.

== Gameplay ==
Stonehearth features a procedurally-generated world where players manage a colony of people called "hearthlings". Players are tasked with caring for their hearthlings including, feeding, sheltering, and defending them from the dangers like orcs and skeletons.

When creating a new world, players go through several series of selections. Players must first select from three different kingdoms, or types, of hearthlings: The Ascendancy, Rayya's Children, and the Northern Alliance. Each kingdom has its own style of play as The Ascendancy is a basic, beginner-oriented type with a focus on Carpentry and easier access to building while Rayya's Children focus more on trade and the Northern Alliance focus on mining and Masonry. Next, the player selects a biome to play in. There are three base biomes: Temperate, Desert, and Arctic; each biome aligns with the theme and are "favored" by of the kingdoms listed respectively.

Temperate is a mostly forested environment with a balance of resources. Desert is a deserted region with occasional rocky mounds and water presents itself as a more flat and open environment for easier expansion. Arctic is a snowy, mountainous region that has plenty of ore and stone. After that the play decides the difficulty which include peaceful, normal, and hard. Peaceful means that there will be no enemy invasion of the player's camp although enemies may be found scattered throughout the wilderness. Normal and hard are quite similar in the sense of occasional invasions and enemy patrols although hard experiences both of these with more frequency and with stronger enemies.

After establishing the general makeup of the playthrough, the player must now select a starting roster of five hearthlings. Every hearthling is random and the player can choose to randomize all or some individual hearthlings again. Each hearthling has three statistics (Mind, Body, Spirit) which are randomly given a score or value ranging from 1-6. Mind represents how fast a hearthling will gain experience and limits their distractibility. Body represents the stamina and health of the hearthling. Spirit represents the friendliness and comradery (seen in effect during invasions) of a hearthling.

After finalizing their roster, the player selects one of five starting packages, each with their own play-style orientation. Lastly, the player must choose where on the map they will settle. Players are presented with a world which is determined by a random or entered seed. For the best chance of success the player must select a map with a balance of the three main resource sources in the game: Tree & Plants, Wildlife, and Minerals. These resources are shown with their frequency level.

== Development ==
Stonehearth was developed by Radiant Entertainment, a company founded by Tom and Tony Cannon, co-founders of the fighting game eSports event Evolution Championship Series. Described as a "passion project" by Tom Cannon, the brothers spent two years making a prototype before creating a Kickstarter campaign to fund the creation in 2013. Asking for $120,000, the campaign ended with $751,920 and 22,844 backers. After the success of the Kickstarter, the development team was expanded with friends of the brothers after pitching the idea to them.

Tom Cannon credits Maxis' Sim games and Dwarf Fortress as inspiration for the city-building mechanics, while the class system was inspired by Final Fantasy Tactics and Tactics Ogre: Let Us Cling Together.

On June 3, 2015, the game was released on Steam Early Access.

Development on the game ended in 2018 with several promised features from the Kickstarter left unimplemented, even though the game Kickstarter surpassed the original goal.

== Reception ==
Reviewing the early access build of the game, Brendan Caldwell from Rock, Paper, Shotgun criticized the pacing, saying that the "build, defend, grow" cycle of the game distracts from the creative side of the game. Caldwell also critiqued the limitations on what to make in the game beyond houses and garrisons. Paul Tamburro from Game Revolution raised the issue of repetitiveness in the game, also criticizing the pace by calling it lackadaisical.

Lena LeRey, writing at Indiegames.com, acknowledged that the early access release was buggy, but still full of promise. At PC Gamer, Christoper Livingston said that he found himself engrossed in the town building elements of the alpha build, but said that he would "probably wait for the beta before [getting] too invested."
