= Helldivers =

2015 video game

- Developer: Arrowhead Game Studios
- Publisher: Sony Computer Entertainment
- Director: Johan Pilestedt
- Designers: Johan Pilestedt; Patrik Lasota
- Programmers: Anton Stenmark; Mikael Bauer; Linus Nilsson; Mikael Berglund
- Artists: Calle Schytt-Winberg; Jim Svanberg; Niklas Malmborg; Therese Jansson; Oskar Kuijken; Lucas Örström
- Composer: Johan Lindgren
- Engine: Autodesk Stingray
- Platforms: PlayStation 4, PlayStation 3, PlayStation Vita, Windows
- Release: NA: 3 March 2015; EU: 4 March 2015 (PS4); EU: 8 July 2015 (PS Vita); Super-Earth Ultimate Edition (PS4): NA: 18 August 2015; AU: 26 August 2015; EU: 28 August 2015; Windows; 7 December 2015
- Genre: Shoot 'em up
- Modes: Single-player, multiplayer

Helldivers is a 2015 top-down shooter video game developed by Arrowhead Game Studios and published by Sony Computer Entertainment. The game was released for PlayStation 3, PlayStation 4, and PlayStation Vita (with cross-play) in March 2015. A version for Windows was also released on 7 December 2015, making it the first Sony-published game for personal computers since Twisted Metal 2 and Jet Moto in 1997. The story follows the Helldivers, a unit of shock troops mobilized to spread managed democracy and defend their way of life.

Helldivers received positive reviews from critics and sold over 4 million units by May 2024. A sequel, Helldivers 2, was announced in May 2023 and was released on 8 February 2024.

== Gameplay ==
In Helldivers, the player needs to coordinate their actions during chaotic combat to complete objectives and avoid friendly fire casualties. The game pits the players against three different enemy species and tasks them with ensuring the survival of Super Earth. Players engage with procedurally generated missions where players must accomplish a series of objectives. At the start of each mission, players can choose their loadouts (sets of weapons, equipment, and gear) and deployment positions. They can also use the game's stratagem mechanic to enhance their options, catering to the map layout or their individual playstyle. For example, the player may choose stratagems that focus on providing additional firepower or mobility, or give themselves supportive abilities such as calling in precise airstrikes.

The game has a single difficulty option, though the player can then choose a hard or easy planet for their missions. This changed over the course of development.

In each mission, the player must fight or sneak through enemy-controlled territory to complete the given objectives, then escape via a dropship. It is possible to fail some of the given objectives without immediately losing. It often benefits the player to avoid direct combat if possible, as the enemy has infinite reinforcements, and there are no in-game rewards for simply killing enemies.

The game keeps many of the mechanics common to the genre, like fog of war and a map that shows any enemies the player(s) can currently see. The enemy will patrol their territory, impeding the player's attempt to complete the given objectives. Enemy units that come in contact with the player(s) will try to raise an alarm, which will result in continuous waves of enemy reinforcements for as long as the alarm remains active. The player can prevent an alarm by avoiding enemy patrols if possible, and can cancel one by defeating all units currently aware of the player or by fleeing the area.

Once all mission objectives are successfully completed or failed, the player is then required to call in a dropship and escape with all their remaining units. This takes 90 seconds and draws enemy attention to the landing zone, resulting in heavy fighting. Entering the dropship completes the mission.

=== Multiplayer ===
Friendly fire is always active. This includes the players' personal weapons as well as other, less direct sources such as air support and deployed turrets. Supply drops or vehicle deployments can also crush allies, requiring players to carefully plan their actions during the game's many chaotic combat sequences or take preventive measures to mitigate these risks. Options include upgrading turrets to prevent them from targeting players or choosing weapons that fire over allies.

There are tangible benefits to multiplayer as teammates can help a downed ally recover, as well as provide healing or ammunition. Several heavy weapons come with a backpack that allows a second player to help reload, and some resources can be pooled for the group to access. In online play, it is possible to allow random players to join a mission in progress through optional matchmaking.

== Premise ==
Helldivers is set in a dystopian universe where humanity is ruled by a totalitarian world order hidden as a "managed democracy", an alteration of a contemporary democracy. The pseudo-democracy also acts a creed by which the inhabitants of Super Earth (the fictional futuristic Earth) fight for without question, but without fully understanding it. Super Earth greatly encourages military service, with the Helldivers—the legion of special forces assigned behind enemy lines—worshipped as idols to the freedom of Super Earth.

Super Earth is threatened by three hostile enemy races: the Bugs, space insects harvested by Super Earth for Element 710, a valuable resource (the number resembles 'OIL' turned 180 degrees); the Cyborgs, a faction of "socio-anarchistic feudal[ist]" separatists outfitted with robotic gear; and the Illuminate, a race of squid-like aliens hunted down by the government. As well as countering primarily through combat, the Helldivers are also tasked with retrieving technology or carrying out certain tasks deemed important by the government in an effort to preserve their freedom and way of life.

== Critical reception ==
Reception

Aggregate score
Aggregator	Score
Metacritic	(PC) 83/100 (PS4) 81/100

Review scores
Publication	Score
Destructoid	(PS4) 9/10
Electronic Gaming Monthly	(PS4) 7/10
Famitsu	31/40
Game Informer	(PS4) 8.5/10
GameSpot	(PS4) 8/10
GameZone	(PS4) 9.5/10
Hardcore Gamer	(PS4) 3.5/5
IGN	(PS4) 9/10
PlayStation Official Magazine – UK	(PS4) 8/10
Push Square	(PS4) 8/10
Shacknews	(PS4) 8/10
USgamer	(PS4) 4/5
VentureBeat	(PS4) 75/100
The Digital Fix	(PS4) 7/10
Metro	8/10

Helldivers received "generally favorable" reviews from critics, according to the review aggregator website Metacritic. In Japan, where the game was ported for release on March 5, 2015, Famitsu gave it a score of two eights, one seven, and one eight for a total of 31 out of 40.

IGN played the demo version of Helldivers at the 2013 Gamescom, and reviewed the demo positively. Game Informer also gave the demo a positive rating, commenting that it "isn't easy, but this throwback to classic top down shooters is still a good time".

GameSpot's reviewer Cameron Woolsey noted that the PlayStation 4 version has "fantastic cooperative action" but "missions and story are lacking". IGN said of the same PS4 version, "Brutal, focused, and mechanically rich, Helldivers is one of the best co-op action experiences you can have."

Helldivers was nominated for "Action Game of the Year" and won for "Handheld Game of the Year" at the 19th Annual D.I.C.E. Awards held by the Academy of Interactive Arts & Sciences.

Helldivers had sold over 4 million units by 22 May 2024.

== Sequel ==
In May 2023, Arrowhead Game Studios and Sony Interactive Entertainment announced a sequel titled Helldivers 2. Unlike the first game, the sequel is no longer a top-down shooter, but instead is a third-person shooter. The game was released for PlayStation 5 and Windows on 8 February 2024, with a release on Xbox Series X|S on 26 August 2025.

== Cameo ==
Some Helldivers soldiers feature in episode 15 of the Secret Level TV series.

== Film adaptation ==
In January 2025, Sony Pictures announced during Sony's CES 2025 conference that they are working on a film based on the game. In December 2025, it was announced that Justin Lin would direct the film from a script by Gary Dauberman. In February 2026, it was announced that Jason Momoa had joined the cast and that the film would be released on November 10, 2027. However, Momoa exited the project in June 2026, with Sony searching for a new star. In September 2026, Alan Ritchson entered talks for a role. Later that month, the movie was delayed to June 9, 2028.
