= D.I.C.E. Award for Action Game of the Year =

Annual award presented by the Academy of Interactive Arts & Sciences

- Country: United States
- Presented by: Academy of Interactive Arts & Sciences
- First award: 1998
- Currently held by: Hades II
- Website: interactive.org

The D.I.C.E. Award for Action Game of the Year is an award presented annually by the Academy of Interactive Arts & Sciences during the D.I.C.E. Awards. This award recognizes titles that "follow the gameplay from the prospective of the character that the player is controlling. These games feature heavy weapons use and/or involve characters engaged in combat while moving through a linear or open environment. The opponent can either be controlled by another player or by the game". All active creative/technical, business, and affiliate members of the Academy are qualified to vote for this category. The award initially had separate awards for console games and computer games at the 1st Annual Interactive Achievement Awards in 1998, with the first winners being GoldenEye 007 for console and Quake II for computer. There have been numerous mergers and additions of action-related games throughout the early years of the awards ceremony's history. The current version was officially introduced at the 11th Annual Interactive Achievement Awards in 2008, which was awarded to Call of Duty 4: Modern Warfare.

The most recent winner of the award is Hades II, developed and published by Supergiant Games.

== History ==
Initially, the Interactive Achievement Awards had separate awards for Console Action Game of the Year and Computer Action Game of the Year. The 1999 awards featured genre-specific Online awards, including Online Action/Strategy Game of the Year. There was only one Online Game of the Year in 2000. In 2001, the awards for action games and adventure games were consolidated to Action/Adventure awards, recognizing titles in which players are challenged with real-time action activities and combat where possibly skill, accuracy and puzzle-solving are required. Additional categories for console and computer first person action games were added for the 6th awards ceremony. This was probably because both winners for console and PC Action/Adventure in 2002 were first-person shooters, being Halo: Combat Evolved for console and Return to Castle Wolfenstein for PC. A category for Console Platform Action/Adventure Game of the Year was also introduced in 2003. Starting in 2006, genre-specific awards would no longer have separate categories for console and computer games, resulting in one Action/Adventure Game of the Year award, which included platform games going forward, and one First-Person Action Game of the Year award. These would ultimately be replaced by Action Game of the Year and Adventure Game of the Year in 2008.

- Console Action Game of the Year (1998–2000)
- Computer Action Game of the Year (1998–2000)
- Online Action/Strategy Game of the Year (1999)
- Console Action/Adventure Game of the Year (2001–2005)
- Computer Action/Adventure Game of the Year (2001–2005)
- Console First-Person Action Game of the Year (2003–2005)
- Computer First-Person Action Game of the Year (2003–2005)
- Console Platform Action/Adventure Game of the Year (2003–2005)
- Action/Adventure Game of the Year (2006–2007)
- First-Person Action Game of the Year (2006–2007)
- Action Game of the Year (2008–present)

== Winners and nominees ==
=== 1990s ===
Table key
Indicates the winner

Year	Game	Developer(s)	Publisher(s)	Ref.
1997/1998 (1st)	Console Action Game of the Year			
1997/1998 (1st)	GoldenEye 007	Rare	Nintendo	
1997/1998 (1st)	Crash Bandicoot 2: Cortex Strikes Back	Naughty Dog	Sony Computer Entertainment	
1997/1998 (1st)	Gex: Enter the Gecko	Crystal Dynamics	Midway Games	
1997/1998 (1st)	Resident Evil 2	Capcom	Capcom	
1997/1998 (1st)	Turok: Dinosaur Hunter	Iguana Entertainment	Acclaim Entertainment	
1997/1998 (1st)	PC Action Game of the Year			
1997/1998 (1st)	Quake II	id Software	Activision	
1997/1998 (1st)	Carmageddon Max Pack	Stainless Games	Interplay Productions	
1997/1998 (1st)	Die By the Sword	Treyarch	Interplay Productions	
1997/1998 (1st)	Star Wars Jedi Knight: Dark Forces II	LucasArts	LucasArts	
1997/1998 (1st)	Redneck Rampage	Xatrix Entertainment	Interplay Productions	
1997/1998 (1st)	Wing Commander: Prophecy	Origin Systems	Electronic Arts	
1998/1999 (2nd)	Console Action Game of the Year			
1998/1999 (2nd)	Banjo-Kazooie	Rare	Nintendo	
1998/1999 (2nd)	Metal Gear Solid	Konami	Konami	
1998/1999 (2nd)	Parasite Eve	SquareSoft	Square Electronic Arts	
1998/1999 (2nd)	Spyro the Dragon	Insomniac Games	Sony Computer Entertainment	
1998/1999 (2nd)	Tenchu: Stealth Assassins	Acquire	Activision	
1998/1999 (2nd)	PC Action Game of the Year			
1998/1999 (2nd)	Half-Life	Valve	Sierra On-Line	
1998/1999 (2nd)	Starsiege: Tribes	Dynamix	Sierra On-Line	
1998/1999 (2nd)	Tom Clancy's Rainbow Six	Red Storm Entertainment	Red Storm Entertainment	
1998/1999 (2nd)	Unreal	Epic Games, Digital Extremes	GT Interactive	
1998/1999 (2nd)	Online Action/Strategy Game of the Year			
1998/1999 (2nd)	Starsiege: Tribes	Dynamix	Sierra On-Line	
1998/1999 (2nd)	Air Warrior III	Kesmai	Interactive Magic	
1998/1999 (2nd)	CyberStrike 2	Simutronics	989 Studios	
1999/2000 (3rd)	Console Action Game of the Year			
1999/2000 (3rd)	Crazy Taxi	Hitmaker	Sega	
1999/2000 (3rd)	Armada	Metro3D	Metro3D	
1999/2000 (3rd)	Gauntlet Legends	Midway Games	Midway Games	
1999/2000 (3rd)	Super Smash Bros.	HAL Laboratory	Nintendo	
1999/2000 (3rd)	Syphon Filter	Eidectic	989 Studios	
1999/2000 (3rd)	Computer Action Game of the Year			
1999/2000 (3rd)	Half-Life: Opposing Force	Gearbox Software	Sierra On-Line	
1999/2000 (3rd)	Quake III Arena	id Software	Activision	
1999/2000 (3rd)	Tom Clancy's Rainbow Six: Rogue Spear	Red Storm Entertainment	Red Storm Entertainment	
1999/2000 (3rd)	Unreal Tournament	Epic Games, Digital Extremes	GT Interactive	

=== 2000s ===
Year	Game	Developer(s)	Publisher(s)	Ref.
2000 (4th)	Console Action/Adventure Game of the Year			
2000 (4th)	The Legend of Zelda: Majora's Mask	Nintendo EAD	Nintendo	
2000 (4th)	Banjo-Tooie	Rare	Nintendo	
2000 (4th)	Rayman 2: The Great Escape	Ubi Pictures	Ubisoft	
2000 (4th)	Spyro: Year of the Dragon	Insomniac Games	Sony Computer Entertainment	
2000 (4th)	Vagrant Story	SquareSoft	Square Electronic Arts	
2000 (4th)	PC Action/Adventure Game of the Year			
2000 (4th)	Deus Ex	Ion Storm	Eidos Interactive	
2000 (4th)	Crimson Skies	Zipper Interactive	Microsoft Games	
2000 (4th)	Escape from Monkey Island	LucasArts	LucasArts	
2000 (4th)	Star Trek: Voyager – Elite Force	Raven Software	Activision	
2000 (4th)	The Operative: No One Lives Forever	Monolith Productions	Fox Interactive	
2001 (5th)	Console Action/Adventure Game of the Year			
2001 (5th)	Halo: Combat Evolved	Bungie	Microsoft Game Studios	
2001 (5th)	Conker's Bad Fur Day	Rare	Rare	
2001 (5th)	Grand Theft Auto III	DMA Design	Rockstar Games	
2001 (5th)	Ico	Japan Studio	Sony Computer Entertainment	
2001 (5th)	Jak & Daxter: The Precursor Legacy	Naughty Dog	Sony Computer Entertainment	
2001 (5th)	PC Action/Adventure Game of the Year			
2001 (5th)	Return to Castle Wolfenstein	Gray Matter Studios	Activision	
2001 (5th)	Aliens Versus Predator 2	Monolith Productions	Sierra On-Line	
2001 (5th)	Clive Barker's Undying	EA Los Angeles	Electronic Arts	
2001 (5th)	Myst III: Exile	Presto Studios	Ubisoft	
2002 (6th)	Console Action/Adventure Game of the Year			
2002 (6th)	Grand Theft Auto: Vice City	Rockstar North	Rockstar Games	
2002 (6th)	Hitman 2: Silent Assassin	IO Interactive	Eidos Interactive	
2002 (6th)	Jet Set Radio Future	Smilebit	Sega	
2002 (6th)	Rez	United Game Artists	Sega	
2002 (6th)	Tom Clancy's Splinter Cell	Ubisoft Montreal	Ubisoft	
2002 (6th)	Computer Action/Adventure Game of the Year			
2002 (6th)	Grand Theft Auto III	Rockstar North	Rockstar Games	
2002 (6th)	Star Wars Jedi Knight II: Jedi Outcast	Raven Software	LucasArts	
2002 (6th)	Syberia	Microïds	The Adventure Company	
2002 (6th)	The Thing	Computer Artworks	Black Label Games	
2002 (6th)	Console First-Person Action Game of the Year			
2002 (6th)	Metroid Prime	Retro Studios	Nintendo	
2002 (6th)	James Bond 007: Nightfire	Eurocom	Electronic Arts	
2002 (6th)	Medal of Honor: Frontline	EA Los Angeles	Electronic Arts	
2002 (6th)	TimeSplitters 2	Free Radical Design	Eidos Interactive	
2002 (6th)	Tom Clancy's Ghost Recon	Red Storm Entertainment	Ubisoft	
2002 (6th)	Computer First-Person Action Game of the Year			
2002 (6th)	Medal of Honor: Allied Assault	2015	Electronic Arts	
2002 (6th)	America's Army	United States Army	United States Army	
2002 (6th)	No One Lives Forever 2: A Spy in H.A.R.M.'s Way	Monolith Productions	Sierra Entertainment	
2002 (6th)	Console Platform Action/Adventure Game of the Year			
2002 (6th)	Ratchet & Clank	Insomniac Games	Sony Computer Entertainment	
2002 (6th)	Sly Cooper and the Thievius Raccoonus	Sucker Punch Productions	Sony Computer Entertainment	
2002 (6th)	Super Mario Sunshine	Nintendo EAD	Nintendo	
2003 (7th)	Console Action/Adventure Game of the Year			
2003 (7th)	Crimson Skies: High Road to Revenge	FASA Studio	Microsoft Game Studios	
2003 (7th)	Manhunt	Rockstar North	Rockstar Games	
2003 (7th)	Max Payne 2: The Fall of Max Payne	Remedy Entertainment	Rockstar Games	
2003 (7th)	Metal Arms: Glitch in the System	Swingin' Ape Studios, Mass Media Games	Vivendi Universal Games	
2003 (7th)	The Simpsons: Hit & Run	Radical Entertainment	Vivendi Universal Games	
2003 (7th)	Computer Action/Adventure Game of the Year			
2003 (7th)	Prince of Persia: The Sands of Time	Ubisoft Montreal	Ubisoft	
2003 (7th)	Grand Theft Auto: Vice City	Rockstar North	Rockstar Games	
2003 (7th)	Max Payne 2: The Fall of Max Payne	Remedy Entertainment	Rockstar Games	
2003 (7th)	The Lord of the Rings: The Return of the King	EA Redwood Studios	Electronic Arts	
2003 (7th)	Uru: Ages Beyond Myst	Cyan Worlds	Ubisoft	
2003 (7th)	Console First-Person Action Game of the Year			
2003 (7th)	Tom Clancy's Rainbow Six 3: Raven Shield	Ubisoft Montreal, Ubisoft Milan, Red Storm Entertainment	Ubisoft	
2003 (7th)	Deus Ex: Invisible War	Ion Storm	Eidos Interactive	
2003 (7th)	Computer First-Person Action Game of the Year			
2003 (7th)	Call of Duty	Infinity Ward	Activision	
2003 (7th)	Battlefield 1942: Secret Weapons of WWII	DICE	Electronic Arts	
2003 (7th)	Tron 2.0	Monolith Productions	Buena Vista Games	
2003 (7th)	Console Platform Action/Adventure Game of the Year			
2003 (7th)	Prince of Persia: The Sands of Time	Ubisoft Montreal	Ubisoft	
2003 (7th)	Jak II	Naughty Dog	Sony Computer Entertainment	
2003 (7th)	Ratchet & Clank: Going Commando	Insomniac Games	Sony Computer Entertainment	
2003 (7th)	The Legend of Zelda: The Wind Waker	Nintendo EAD	Nintendo	
2003 (7th)	Viewtiful Joe	Clover Studio	Capcom	
2004 (8th)	Console Action/Adventure Game of the Year			
2004 (8th)	Grand Theft Auto: San Andreas	Rockstar North	Rockstar Games	
2004 (8th)	Full Spectrum Warrior	Pandemic Studios	THQ	
2004 (8th)	Metal Gear Solid 3: Snake Eater	Konami	Konami	
2004 (8th)	Pikmin 2	Nintendo EAD	Nintendo	
2004 (8th)	Psi-Ops: The Mindgate Conspiracy	Midway Games	Midway Games	
2004 (8th)	Tom Clancy's Splinter Cell: Pandora Tomorrow	Ubisoft Milan, Ubisoft Shanghai	Ubisoft	
2004 (8th)	Computer Action/Adventure Game of the Year			
2004 (8th)	Tom Clancy's Splinter Cell: Pandora Tomorrow	Ubisoft Milan, Ubisoft Shanghai	Ubisoft	
2004 (8th)	Full Spectrum Warrior	Pandemic Studios	THQ	
2004 (8th)	Myst IV: Revelation	Ubisoft Montreal	Ubisoft	
2004 (8th)	The Suffering	Surreal Software	Midway Games, Encore, Inc.	
2004 (8th)	Console First-Person Action Game of the Year			
2004 (8th)	Halo 2	Bungie	Microsoft Game Studios	
2004 (8th)	GoldenEye: Rogue Agent	EA Los Angeles	Electronic Arts	
2004 (8th)	Killzone	Guerrilla Games	Sony Computer Entertainment	
2004 (8th)	Metroid Prime 2: Echoes	Retro Studios	Nintendo	
2004 (8th)	The Chronicles of Riddick: Escape from Butcher Bay	Starbreeze Studios	Vivendi Universal Games	
2004 (8th)	Computer First-Person Action Game of the Year			
2004 (8th)	Half-Life 2	Valve	Vivendi Universal Games	
2004 (8th)	Doom 3	id Software	Activision	
2004 (8th)	Joint Operations: Typhoon Rising	NovaLogic	NovaLogic	
2004 (8th)	Medal of Honor: Pacific Assault	EA Los Angeles	Electronic Arts	
2004 (8th)	Unreal Tournament 2004	Epic Games, Digital Extremes	Atari	
2004 (8th)	Console Platform Action/Adventure Game of the Year			
2004 (8th)	Prince of Persia: Warrior Within	Ubisoft Montreal	Ubisoft	
2004 (8th)	Jak 3	Naughty Dog	Sony Computer Entertainment	
2004 (8th)	Ratchet & Clank: Up Your Arsenal	Insomniac Games	Sony Computer Entertainment	
2005 (9th)	Action/Adventure Game of the Year			
2005 (9th)	God of War	Santa Monica Studio	Sony Computer Entertainment	
2005 (9th)	Prince of Persia: The Two Thrones	Ubisoft Montreal	Ubisoft	
2005 (9th)	Shadow of the Colossus	Japan Studio	Sony Computer Entertainment	
2005 (9th)	The Incredible Hulk: Ultimate Destruction	Radical Entertainment	Vivendi Universal Games	
2005 (9th)	Tom Clancy's Splinter Cell: Chaos Theory	Ubisoft Montreal, Ubisoft Milan	Ubisoft	
2005 (9th)	First-Person Action Game of the Year			
2005 (9th)	Battlefield 2	DICE	Electronic Arts	
2005 (9th)	Brothers in Arms: Road to Hill 30	Gearbox Software	Ubisoft	
2005 (9th)	Call of Duty 2	Infinity Ward	Activision	
2005 (9th)	Condemned: Criminal Origins	Monolith Productions	Sega	
2005 (9th)	F.E.A.R.	Monolith Productions	Vivendi Universal Games	
2006 (10th)	Action/Adventure Game of the Year			
2006 (10th)	Gears of War	Epic Games	Microsoft Game Studios	
2006 (10th)	Daxter	Ready at Dawn	Sony Computer Entertainment	
2006 (10th)	Saints Row	Volition	THQ	
2006 (10th)	The Legend of Zelda: Twilight Princess	Nintendo EAD	Nintendo	
2006 (10th)	Tom Clancy's Splinter Cell: Double Agent	Ubisoft Milan, Ubisoft Shanghai, Ubisoft Montreal	Ubisoft	
2006 (10th)	First-Person Action Game of the Year			
2006 (10th)	Tom Clancy's Rainbow Six: Vegas	Ubisoft Montreal	Ubisoft	
2006 (10th)	Black	Criterion Games	Electronic Arts	
2006 (10th)	Half-Life 2: Episode One	Valve	Valve, Electronic Arts	
2006 (10th)	Prey	Human Head Studios	2K Games	
2006 (10th)	Resistance: Fall of Man	Insomniac Games	Sony Computer Entertainment	
2007 (11th)	Call of Duty 4: Modern Warfare	Infinity Ward	Activision	
2007 (11th)	BioShock	2K Boston, 2K Australia	2K Games	
2007 (11th)	Crysis	Crytek	Electronic Arts	
2007 (11th)	Halo 3	Bungie	Microsoft Game Studios	
2007 (11th)	The Orange Box	Valve	Valve, Electronic Arts	
2008 (12th)	Dead Space	EA Redwood Shores	Electronic Arts	
2008 (12th)	Call of Duty: World at War	Treyarch	Activision	
2008 (12th)	Far Cry 2	Ubisoft Montreal	Ubisoft	
2008 (12th)	Gears of War 2	Epic Games	Microsoft Game Studios	
2008 (12th)	Grand Theft Auto IV	Rockstar North	Rockstar Games	
2009 (13th)	Call of Duty: Modern Warfare 2	Infinity Ward	Activision	
2009 (13th)	Left 4 Dead 2	Valve	Valve	
2009 (13th)	Prototype	Radical Entertainment	Activision	
2009 (13th)	Red Faction: Guerrilla	Volition	THQ	
2009 (13th)	Shadow Complex	Chair Entertainment	Microsoft Game Studios	

=== 2010s ===
Year	Game	Developer(s)	Publisher(s)	Ref.
2010 (14th)	Red Dead Redemption	Rockstar San Diego	Rockstar Games	
2010 (14th)	Battlefield: Bad Company 2	DICE	Electronic Arts	
2010 (14th)	Call of Duty: Black Ops	Treyarch	Activision	
2010 (14th)	God of War III	Santa Monica Studio	Sony Computer Entertainment	
2010 (14th)	Halo: Reach	Bungie	Microsoft Game Studios	
2011 (15th)	Call of Duty: Modern Warfare 3	Infinity Ward	Activision	
2011 (15th)	Battlefield 3	DICE	Electronic Arts	
2011 (15th)	Dead Space 2	Visceral Games	Electronic Arts	
2011 (15th)	Gears of War 3	Epic Games	Microsoft Game Studios	
2011 (15th)	Saints Row: The Third	Volition	THQ	
2012 (16th)	Borderlands 2	Gearbox Software	2K Games	
2012 (16th)	Far Cry 3	Ubisoft Montreal	Ubisoft	
2012 (16th)	Halo 4	343 Industries	Microsoft Studios	
2012 (16th)	Hitman: Absolution	IO Interactive	Square Enix Europe	
2012 (16th)	Sleeping Dogs	United Front Games	Square Enix Europe	
2013 (17th)	BioShock Infinite	Irrational Games	2K Games	
2013 (17th)	Battlefield 4	DICE	Electronic Arts	
2013 (17th)	Dead Rising 3	Capcom Vancouver	Microsoft Studios	
2013 (17th)	DmC: Devil May Cry	Ninja Theory	Capcom	
2013 (17th)	Resogun	Housemarque	Sony Computer Entertainment	
2014 (18th)	Destiny	Bungie	Activision	
2014 (18th)	Call of Duty: Advanced Warfare	Sledgehammer Games	Activision	
2014 (18th)	Far Cry 4	Ubisoft Montreal	Ubisoft	
2014 (18th)	Titanfall	Respawn Entertainment	Electronic Arts	
2014 (18th)	Wolfenstein: The New Order	MachineGames	Bethesda Softworks	
2015 (19th)	Star Wars Battlefront	DICE	Electronic Arts	
2015 (19th)	Destiny: The Taken King	Bungie	Activision	
2015 (19th)	Helldivers	Arrowhead Game Studios	Sony Computer Entertainment	
2015 (19th)	Just Cause 3	Avalanche Studios	Square Enix Europe	
2015 (19th)	Splatoon	Nintendo EAD	Nintendo	
2016 (20th)	Overwatch	Blizzard Entertainment	Blizzard Entertainment	
2016 (20th)	Battlefield 1	DICE	Electronic Arts	
2016 (20th)	Doom	id Software	Bethesda Softworks	
2016 (20th)	Gears of War 4	The Coalition	Microsoft Studios	
2016 (20th)	Titanfall 2	Respawn Entertainment	Electronic Arts	
2017 (21st)	PlayerUnknown's Battlegrounds	PUBG Corporation	Bluehole	
2017 (21st)	Call of Duty: WWII	Sledgehammer Games	Activision	
2017 (21st)	Cuphead	Studio MDHR	Studio MDHR	
2017 (21st)	Destiny 2	Bungie	Activision	
2017 (21st)	Wolfenstein II: The New Colossus	MachineGames	Bethesda Softworks	
2018 (22nd)	Celeste	Matt Makes Games	Matt Makes Games	
2018 (22nd)	Call of Duty: Black Ops 4	Treyarch	Activision	
2018 (22nd)	Destiny 2: Forsaken	Bungie	Activision	
2018 (22nd)	Far Cry 5	Ubisoft Montreal	Ubisoft	
2018 (22nd)	Shadow of the Tomb Raider	Eidos-Montréal	Square Enix Europe	
2019 (23rd)	Control	Remedy Entertainment	505 Games	
2019 (23rd)	Call of Duty: Modern Warfare	Infinity Ward	Activision	
2019 (23rd)	Devil May Cry 5	Capcom	Capcom	
2019 (23rd)	Gears 5	The Coalition	Xbox Game Studios	
2019 (23rd)	Sekiro: Shadows Die Twice	FromSoftware	Activision	

=== 2020s ===
Year	Game	Developer(s)	Publisher(s)	Ref.
2020 (24th)	Hades	Supergiant Games	Supergiant Games	
2020 (24th)	Doom Eternal	id Software	Bethesda Softworks	
2020 (24th)	Half-Life: Alyx	Valve	Valve	
2020 (24th)	Marvel's Spider-Man: Miles Morales	Insomniac Games	Sony Interactive Entertainment	
2020 (24th)	Nioh 2	Team Ninja	Sony Interactive Entertainment	
2021 (25th)	Halo Infinite	343 Industries	Xbox Game Studios	
2021 (25th)	Deathloop	Arkane Studios	Bethesda Softworks	
2021 (25th)	Metroid Dread	MercurySteam	Nintendo	
2021 (25th)	Returnal	Housemarque	Sony Interactive Entertainment	
2021 (25th)	The Ascent	Neon Giant	Curve Digital	
2022 (26th)	Vampire Survivors	poncle	poncle	
2022 (26th)	Bayonetta 3	PlatinumGames	Nintendo	
2022 (26th)	Grounded	Obsidian Entertainment	Xbox Game Studios	
2022 (26th)	Neon White	Angel Matrix	Annapurna Interactive	
2022 (26th)	Sifu	Sloclap	Sloclap	
2023 (27th)	Marvel's Spider-Man 2	Insomniac Games	Sony Interactive Entertainment	
2023 (27th)	Armored Core VI: Fires of Rubicon	FromSoftware	Bandai Namco	
2023 (27th)	Dead Space	Motive Studios	Electronic Arts	
2023 (27th)	Hi-Fi Rush	Tango Gameworks	Bethesda Softworks	
2023 (27th)	Remnant II	Gunfire Games	Gearbox Publishing	
2024 (28th)	Helldivers 2	Arrowhead Game Studios	Sony Interactive Entertainment	
2024 (28th)	Batman: Arkham Shadow	Camouflaj	Oculus Studios	
2024 (28th)	Black Myth: Wukong	Game Science	Game Science	
2024 (28th)	Call of Duty: Black Ops 6	Treyarch	Activision	
2024 (28th)	Stellar Blade	Shift Up	Sony Interactive Entertainment	
2025 (29th)	Hades II	Supergiant Games	Supergiant Games	
2025 (29th)	Absolum	Guard Crush Games, Supamonks	Dotemu	
2025 (29th)	ARC Raiders	Embark Studios	Embark Studios	
2025 (29th)	Doom: The Dark Ages	id Software	Bethesda Softworks	
2025 (29th)	Ninja Gaiden 4	Team Ninja, PlatinumGames	Xbox Game Studios	

== Multiple nominations and wins ==
=== Developers and publishers ===
Electronic Arts and Sony have published the most nominees for action-related Game of the Year awards. Activision and Ubisoft are tied for publishing the most winners for action-related Game of the Year awards. Ubisoft Montreal has developed the most nominees and award winners. Ubisoft Montreal is the only developer to win more than one award for the same game in the same year with Prince of Persia: The Sands of Time, winning for Console Platform Action/Adventure Game of the Year and Computer Action/Adventure Game of the Year in 2004.

Rockstar North and Rockstar Games have also won multiple awards in the same year, but for different games in 2003:

- Grand Theft Auto: Vice City won Console Action/Adventure Game of the Year
- Grand Theft Auto III won Computer Action/Adventure Game of the Year

Sierra On-Line has published the winners for multiple awards with different developers in the same year:

- Valve developed Half-Life which won PC Action Game of the Year
- Dynamix developed Starsiege: Tribes which won Online Action/Strategy Game of the Year

There are three publishers with back-to-back wins with different developers:

- Sierra On-Line for PC Action Game of the Year:
  - Valve developed Half-Life (1999)
  - Gearbox Software developed Half-Life: Opposing Force (2000)
- 2K Games:
  - Gearbox Software developed Borderlands 2 (2013)
  - Irrational Games developed BioShock Infinite (2014)
- Sony Interactive Entertainment:
  - Insomniac Games developed Marvel's Spider-Man 2 (2024)
  - Arrowhead Game Studios developed Helldivers 2 (2025)

There have also been two back-to-back developer-and-publisher winners of the same award:

- Rare and Nintendo won Console Action Game of the Year with GoldenEye 007 in 1998, and Banjo-Kazooie in 1999
- Ubisoft Montreal and Ubisoft won Console Platform Action/Adventure Game of the Year with Prince of Persia: The Sands of Time in 2004, and Prince of Persia: Warrior Within in 2005

Developers
Developer	Nominations	Wins
Ubisoft Montreal	14	6
Infinity Ward	6	4
Bungie	8	3
DICE	7	3
Rockstar North/DMA Design	7	3
Insomniac Games	8	2
Valve	6	2
Ubisoft Milan	5	2
Rare	4	2
Gearbox Software	3	2
Supergiant Games	2	2
Epic Games	6	1
id Software	6	1
Nintendo EAD	6	1
Red Storm Entertainment	4	1
Ubisoft Shanghai	4	1
EA Redwood Shores/Visceral Games	3	1
Remedy Entertainment	3	1
343 Industries	2	1
Arrowhead Game Studios	2	1
Dynamix	2	1
Ion Storm	2	1
Irrational Games/2K Boston	2	1
Retro Studios	2	1
Santa Monica Studio	2	1
Monolith Productions	6	0
Treyarch	5	0
EA Los Angeles	4	0
Naughty Dog	4	0
Capcom	3	0
Digital Extremes	3	0
Radical Entertainment	3	0
Volition	3	0
The Coalition	2	0
FromSoftware	2	0
Housemarque	2	0
IO Interactive	2	0
Japan Studio	2	0
Konami	2	0
LucasArts	2	0
MachineGames	2	0
Midway Games	2	0
Pandemic Studios	2	0
PlatinumGames	2	0
Raven Software	2	0
Respawn Entertainment	2	0
Sledgehammer Games	2	0
SquareSoft	2	0
Team Ninja	2	0

Publishers
Publisher	Nominations	Wins
Activision	23	6
Ubisoft	20	6
Microsoft/Xbox Game Studios	17	5
Electronic Arts	25	4
Sony Computer/Interactive Entertainment	25	4
Nintendo	14	4
Rockstar Games	10	4
Sierra On-Line/Entertainment	6	3
2K Games	4	2
Supergiant Games	2	2
Eidos Interactive/Square Enix Europe	8	1
Vivendi Universal Games	6	1
Sega	4	1
Bethesda Softworks	7	0
SquareSoft/Square Enix	6	0
THQ	5	0
Capcom	4	0
Midway Games	4	0
Valve	4	0
GT Interactive	3	0
Interplay Productions	3	0
LucasArts	3	0
989 Studios	2	0
Konami	2	0
Red Storm Entertainment	2	0

=== Franchises ===
The Call of Duty franchise has received the most nominations and won the most awards. The Tom Clancy's franchise is second in nominations and tied for second-most wins with the Grand Theft Auto, Half-Life, Halo, and Prince of Persia franchises. In the early years of the Interactive Achievement Awards when there were multiple awards for action-related genres, some franchises has had multiple nominations in the same year. The 6th Annual Interactive Achievement Awards in 2003 have had three franchises receiving multiple nominations/awards with more than one game in action-related categories:

- Tom Clancy's Splinter Cell was nominated for Console Action/Adventure Game of the Year, and Tom Clancy's Ghost Recon was nominated for Console First-Person Action Game of the Year
- Medal of Honor: Frontline was nominated for Console First-Person Action Game of the Year, and Medal of Honor: Allied Assault won Computer First-Person Action Game of the Year
- Grand Theft Auto: Vice City won Console Action/Adventure Game of the Year, and Grand Theft Auto III won Computer Action/Adventure Game of the Year

Some games have received more than one nomination in the same year for action-related awards:

- Starsiege: Tribes (1999): Nominated for PC Action Game of the Year, and won Online Action/Strategy Game of the Year
- Prince of Persia: The Sands of Time (2004): Won Computer Action/Adventure Game of the Year and Console Platform Action/Adventure Game of the Year
- Max Payne 2: The Fall of Max Payne (2004): Nominated for Console Action/Adventure Game of the Year and Computer Action/Adventure Game of the Year
- Full Spectrum Warrior (2005): Nominated for Console Action/Adventure Game of the Year and Computer Action/Adventure Game of the Year
- Tom Clancy's Splinter Cell: Pandora Tomorrow (2005): Nominated for Console Action/Adventure Game of the Year, and won Computer Action/Adventure Game of the Year

Some games have received multiple nominations spread across multiple years, mostly for expansion packs.

- Half-Life won Computer Action Game of the Year in 1999, and the expansion pack Opposing Force won the same award in 2000
- Grand Theft Auto III was nominated for Console Action/Adventure Game of the Year in 2002, and won Computer Action/Adventure Game of the Year in 2003
- Grand Theft Auto: Vice City won Console Action/Adventure Game of the Year in 2003, and was nominated for Computer Action/Adventure Game of the Year in 2004
- Half-Life 2 won Computer First-Person Action Game of the Year in 2005, the Episode One expansion was nominated for First-Person Action Game of the Year in 2007, and the Episode Two expansion, included in The Orange Box compilation, was nominated for Action Game of the Year in 2008
- Destiny won in 2015, and the expansion pack The Taken King was nominated in 2016
- Destiny 2 was nominated in 2018, and the expansion pack Forsaken was nominated in 2019

There are only two franchises that have back-to-back wins for the same action-related award. The first is Half-Life for Computer Action Game of the Year in 1999 and 2000, and the second is Prince of Persia for Console Platform Action/Adventure Game of the Year in 2004 and 2005. Both the original Dead Space and the 2023 remake have been named as finalists, with the former winning the award outright.

Franchises
Franchise	Nominations	Wins
Call of Duty	12	4
Tom Clancy's	10	3
Grand Theft Auto	6	3
Half-Life (Note: Half-Life 2: Episode Two is included in The Orange Box.)	6	3
Halo	6	3
Prince of Persia	4	3
Hades	2	2
Battlefield	6	1
Gears of War	5	1
Destiny	4	1
Dead Space	3	1
James Bond 007	3	1
Medal of Honor	3	1
Metroid	3	1
Ratchet & Clank	3	1
Star Wars	3	1
The Legend of Zelda	3	1
Wolfenstein	3	1
Banjo-Kazooie	2	1
BioShock	2	1
Crimson Skies	2	1
Deus Ex	2	1
God of War	2	1
Helldivers	2	1
Marvel's Spider-Man	2	1
Quake	2	1
Tribes	2	1
Doom	4	0
Far Cry	4	0
Jak & Daxter	3	0
Myst	3	0
Unreal	3	0
Devil May Cry	2	0
Full Spectrum Warrior	2	0
Hitman	2	0
Max Payne	2	0
Metal Gear	2	0
No One Lives Forever	2	0
Saints Row	2	0
Spyro	2	0
Titanfall	2	0
