= Dan McGirt =

American author of comic fantasy (born 1967)

- Born: 1967 (age 58–59)
- Occupation: Novelist
- Writing career
- Genre: Comic fantasy
- Website: www.sff.net/people/mcgirt

Dan McGirt (born 1967) is an American author of comic fantasy. His current books consist of the Jason Cosmo series, which was rebooted in 2009 with the publication of Hero Wanted. The Original Jason Cosmo Non-Trilogy was envisioned as an ongoing series, but was discontinued by the publisher after Dirty Work. He is a member of Science Fiction and Fantasy Writers of America (SFWA) and Novelists, Inc (NINC).

== Bibliography ==
=== Short stories ===
- Sarah Palin: Vampire Hunter
- Beginner’s Luck
- Jack Scarlet: Bullets for Breakfast
- Jack Scarlet: A Cold, Cold Place to Die

=== Series ===
==== The Original Jason Cosmo Non-Trilogy ====
1. Jason Cosmo (1989)
2. Royal Chaos (1990)
3. Dirty Work (1993)

==== Jason Cosmo ====
1. Hero Wanted (2009) - a rewrite of Jason Cosmo (1989)
2. Noble Cause (2012)
3. Royal Crush (2015) - an update of Royal Chaos (1990)

Shortfiction: Rainy Daze (2009) - available at Smashwords

=== Novels ===
1. Magicka: The Ninth Element (2013)
