= Helldivers 2 =

2024 video game

- Original cover art
- Developer: Arrowhead Game Studios (Note: Additional work and development support by Nixxes Software and Toadman Interactive. Xbox Series X/S version ported by Nixxes.)
- Publisher: Sony Interactive Entertainment
- Directors: Johan Pilestedt; Emil Englund; Patrik Lasota; Mikael Eriksson; Sagar Beroshi
- Producers: Alex Bolle; Evan Nickel
- Designers: Niklas Malmborg; Oliver Rankloo
- Programmers: Peter Lindgren; Grigoris Nikiforakis
- Artists: Felix Fritzell; Calle Schytt-Winberg
- Writers: Nils Hansson Bjerke; Russell Nickel
- Composer: Wilbert Roget II (Note: Additional music by Ross Tregenza)
- Engine: Autodesk Stingray
- Platforms: PlayStation 5; Windows; Xbox Series X/S
- Release: PlayStation 5, Windows; 8 February 2024; Xbox Series X/S; 26 August 2025
- Genre: Third-person shooter
- Mode: Multiplayer

Helldivers 2 is a 2024 cooperative multiplayer third-person shooter video game developed by Arrowhead Game Studios and published by Sony Interactive Entertainment. The sequel to Helldivers (2015), the game is set in the 22nd century and follows the Helldiver Corps of Super Earth, a division of shock troops dispatched to combat various threats to humanity and to spread managed democracy.

Helldivers 2 was released on 8 February 2024 for PlayStation 5 and Windows and then on Xbox Series X/S on 26 August 2025. The game was a critical and commercial success, having sold over 20 million copies and grossed over $700 million in revenue. Considered among the best video games of 2024, it was nominated for and won a number of awards.

== Gameplay ==
Helldivers 2 is a live service player versus environment (PvE) shooter game played primarily from a third-person perspective. It features cooperative multiplayer with up to four players, and does not include a dedicated single-player campaign. It provides optional cross-play.

Players complete operations consisting of 1-3 procedurally generated levels (missions), conducting tasks within the missions (objectives), while facing hordes of enemies. Players choose the difficulty level of their operations, ranging from level 1 ("Trivial") to level 10 ("Super Helldive").

A player using the Orbital Laser Stratagem to battle Terminids.

Players enter missions by dropping onto planets from their Super Destroyer starship in a transportation device called a "Hellpod". A core gameplay feature carried over from the first game is the use of Stratagems, powerful equipment which must be called in from their Super Destroyer by executing a sequence of directional button or arrow key inputs. Players may select up to four stratagems in advance to bring into the mission, as well as a "Booster" which affects the whole team. Friendly fire is always on during missions. In the initial days of release, gameplay involved staff at the studio observing players and influencing gameplay in real time.

Players can obtain in-game currency which may be discovered in the environment during missions, or awarded by completing operations, missions, and objectives. As players gain experience and progress in levels, they unlock different weapons and Stratagems. Players gain experience points toward their overall level. Upon initial release, the highest level a player could reach was 50; this was subsequently increased to 150 in April 2024, and to 300 in August 2026. Players can collect samples during missions, which are used to upgrade the player's Super Destroyer, providing advantages during gameplay. By completing operations, players contribute to the collective progress of "Major Orders", which are mass-collaborative missions that directly affect the outcome of the Galactic War in-game. Players can also complete daily challenges known as "Personal Orders" for lesser rewards. Introduced in June 2026, the "Control Center" within the Super Destroyer allows players to access information about ongoing and past Major Orders, campaigns and rewards.

Helldivers 2 has a battle pass system called "Warbonds" that never expire. Warbonds can be purchased with in-game currency known as "Super Credits", which players can obtain in-game during some missions, purchase via microtransactions, or unlock as part of the Warbonds themselves. On 26 August 2025, coinciding with the game's release on the Xbox platform, Arrowhead added the "Warbond Token" to the Super Citizen Edition deluxe edition of the game. This Token allowed for the free purchase of any one Warbond, replacing the original benefit of the Super Citizen Edition, which was free access to the first non-base game Warbond. It was later confirmed that Warbond Tokens could not be used to get the "Legendary Warbonds" containing crossover content, which cost more Super Credits than regular Warbonds.

Helldivers 2 features three distinct enemy factions. Available at launch were the Terminids and Automatons, followed by the Illuminate on 12 December 2024. The Terminids, alien insects, utilize melee tactics and deploy combatants en masse. The robotic Automatons use ranged weapons and heavy artillery, such as mortar installations and units with rocket launchers mounted on their backs. Finally, the squid-like Illuminate use advanced energy shields and plasma weaponry deployed by airborne and ground-level armored units, as well as citizens of Super Earth turned into “Voteless” zombies that swarm in numbers similar to those of the Terminids.

The game includes non-player character allies in the form of soldiers of the Super Earth Armed Forces (SEAF). The SEAF were added in May 2025 as part of the "Heart of Democracy" update and were greatly expanded in August 2026 as part of the "Devoid of Liberty" update. Prior to August 2026, the SEAF were only present on "Mega City" maps, large urban centers under attack by the enemy. "Devoid of Liberty" added in a potential mission modifier that would allow SEAF forces to be deployed by dropship at random points throughout the mission, as well as allowing the SEAF to possess more varied equipment and respond to players' emotes. The SEAF patrol the map in groups, engage enemies and enemy fortifications on their own, and follow players or hold positions when prompted. SEAF combat medics will also heal injured players as of August 2026.

== Synopsis ==
=== Setting ===
Helldivers 2 takes place in the 22nd century, one hundred years after the triumph of the Federation of Super Earth, a self-described managed democracy, over the Bugs, Cyborgs, and Illuminate during the First Galactic War (depicted in Helldivers). Humanity seized faster-than-light (FTL) travel technology from the defeated Illuminate, and used it to conquer the galaxy during a period known as the Great Democratization. Humanity discovered that the decomposing corpses of the Bugs contain a unique and highly valuable resource known as "Element-710" (E-710) used for FTL travel. Bug farms are established on human-colonized worlds, and after decades of genetic engineering and accelerated evolution, they become known as Terminids.

Environmental storytelling is prevalent throughout the game, with various logs, notes, in-game broadcasts, and propaganda messages available for players to find during gameplay.

=== Plot ===
The plot of Helldivers 2 develops in real time, based on Major Orders and decisions collectively taken by the player community.

The events of Helldivers 2 begin in the year 2184 after the Super Earth Armed Forces (SEAF) fail to contain the Terminids, which have escaped their farms, causing chaos and destruction. Simultaneously, a threat emerges in the form of the Automatons, creations of the defeated Cyborgs, intending to get revenge against humanity. In response, Super Earth declares war and mobilizes the Helldivers, an elite task force, to combat the threats.

The initial Automaton expedition culminated in battles on Malevelon Creek, resulting in two months of fighting and high Helldiver casualties before the planet was finally taken. Meanwhile, an effort to destroy the Terminid presence on several worlds fails, and planet Meridia becomes a Terminid "Supercolony". Using a substance called Dark Fluid, the Helldivers trigger a planetary collapse on Meridia, transforming it into a wormhole. Not long after the destruction of Meridia, an interstellar cloud of spores called "The Gloom" emerged deep within Terminid space, terraforming planets within and birthing new variants of Terminids.

As a result of many costly battles, the Helldivers embarked on an expansive project to construct the Democracy Space Station (DSS), a massive orbital battle station capable of supporting Helldiver campaigns with ordnance and soldier optimization. The Helldivers were deployed to defend the construction of the DSS, while destroying Automatons to utilize their technology and harvesting E-710 from the Terminids for fuel. After several weeks, the DSS was completed, and the Helldivers were granted the ability to vote on where to periodically deploy it.

On 12 December 2184, humanity discovered that the Illuminate, an ancient and technologically advanced alien race thought to be extinct, returned and began to invade Super Earth's colonies. The Helldivers repelled the Illuminate in the bloody Battle of Calypso. However, the wormhole produced from the destruction of Meridia, dubbed the "Meridian Singularity," suddenly began moving towards Super Earth, destroying multiple planets in its path.

Though the Helldivers were able to halt the Singularity's advance, an Illuminate invasion fleet emerged from within, and ultimately launched an invasion on Super Earth. SEAF and the Helldivers successfully repelled the Illuminate invasion, but at the cost of tremendous civilian, military casualties and the destruction of all but two of Super Earth's Mega Cities.

Following the Battle of Super Earth, the remnants of the Illuminate invasion fleet retreated south, heavily entrenching themselves on various planets. In response, Super Earth began construction of a new Super Destroyer fleet. In the summer of 2185, all three factions launched a coordinated offensive, pushing the Helldivers to the brink before the new fleet arrived on 26 August 2185. The Helldivers were then ordered to perform an expedition into the Terminid hive worlds that lay within the expanding Gloom in order to extract newly discovered E-711. The first expedition into the Gloom on the hive world Oshaune resulted in the highest Helldiver casualty rate of the war thus far. After upgrading the DSS with anti-Gloom shield coating, the Helldivers managed to take Oshaune in a grueling battle, significantly reducing the Glooms' territorial spread and setting up infrastructure to extract E-711 and prepare for further campaigns.

In December 2185, Super Earth discovered the Automatons were conducting large scale mining operations for resources on volcanic planets. The Helldivers were issued emergency orders to take these planets and to repossess all the resources extracted by the Automatons.

Meanwhile, Super Earth declared the "War on Dissidence", designating all territories across the galaxy as war zones and constructing a "Center for the Containment of Dissidence" on Afoyay Bay.

In January 2186, Super Earth constructed the Star of Peace, a planet-destroying superweapon. The Helldivers voted to test the weapon on the Automaton held world, Penta, turning it into a black hole. However, firing the Star of Peace resulted in the DSS being severely damaged and taken offline for repairs. Additionally, the plans for the Star of Peace were seemingly accessed by a then-unknown enemy. As a result, Super Earth deployed the Helldivers as commandos deep behind Automaton lines in covert stealth operations with greatly reduced support from their Super Destroyers. Super Earth discovered the Automatons were behind the theft of the Star of Peace plans and immediately mounted an offensive toward planet Cyberstan, home world of the Automatons.

As Super Earth invaded Automaton-held planets on the path to Cyberstan, their communications systems were hacked by the Automatons, who initiated a campaign of demoralization propaganda against humanity. On 9 February 2186, the Cyborgs revealed themselves to have survived the First Galactic War, and as the source of the hack. On 10 February 2186, Super Earth mobilized the Helldivers against the Cyborg Legion in a massive invasion on Cyberstan. On 20 February 2186, the Helldivers exhausted the reinforcements allocated for the invasion, leading to a withdrawal from the planet and the operation was deemed a failure.

In March 2186, Super Earth detected anomalous signals coming from planet Seasse, home to ancient Illuminate ruins. On 20 March 2186, the Helldivers were deployed, discovering superstructures called "Exospires", which when activated cause severe weather across the planet. Super Earth ordered the Helldivers to liberate the planet and destroy the Exospires. Despite efforts from the Helldivers, the Exospires on Seasse continued to worsen weather conditions to the point where spacetime around the system began to fracture, leading to the planet being plunged into a Void, where visibility and access to the planet was lost.

In the months after the apparition of the Void, which consumed several nearby planets, Super Earth cleared planets for the construction of residential developments for its most affluent citizens. In June and July 2186, Super Earth launched a successful campaign to build a "Celestial Fence" to keep the Terminids at bay. Meanwhile, Super Earth also launched a defensive campaign against the Cyborgs and Automatons who were revealed to be constructing a planetary death laser.

The Automatons eventually deployed their superweapon, which was engaged and destroyed by the DSS after a Helldiver campaign to locate it. Following this, Super Earth began creating a "Gateway" to the Void, eventually completing the Gateway and deploying the Helldivers, with SEAF forces assisting the Helldivers directly. After a push through the Void, encountering planets warped by the Illuminate, the Helldivers located the "Source Planet", a heavily terraformed and warped Seasse. Seasse was liberated and the Void vanished. SEAF forces continued to aid Helldivers on other planets following the completion of the Void campaign.

== Development and release ==
On 3 December 2020, Arrowhead Game Studios revealed that work had started on a project for PlayStation 5. It was confirmed that the game would be a third-person shooter. Like the first game, Helldivers 2 runs on the discontinued Autodesk Stingray game engine (originally known as Bitsquid). Arrowhead Game Studios founder Johan Pilestedt confirmed on social media that "The project started before [Stingray] was discontinued," adding, "Our crazy engineers had to do everything, with no support to build the game to parity with other engines."

On 13 September 2021, Helldivers 2 was mentioned in a GeForce Now leak. The game was teased in a TikTok post showing Arrowhead's social media manager starting their workday, which is followed by a series of posts from fans demanding them to release the game. On 18 August 2022, a 12-second clip of gameplay was leaked on Twitter, but was later removed.

On 24 May 2023, Helldivers 2 was announced during the 2023 PlayStation Showcase, with a slated release of sometime in 2023. On 6 July 2023, a trailer showcasing gameplay was released. On 30 July 2023, the game received an M rating by the Entertainment Software Rating Board for "blood and gore" and "intense violence". On 14 September 2023, gameplay was shown in a PlayStation State of Play event, and it was announced that the game would release on 8 February 2024. Pre-orders became available on 22 September 2023. On 8 February 2024, the game was released on the PlayStation Store and Steam.

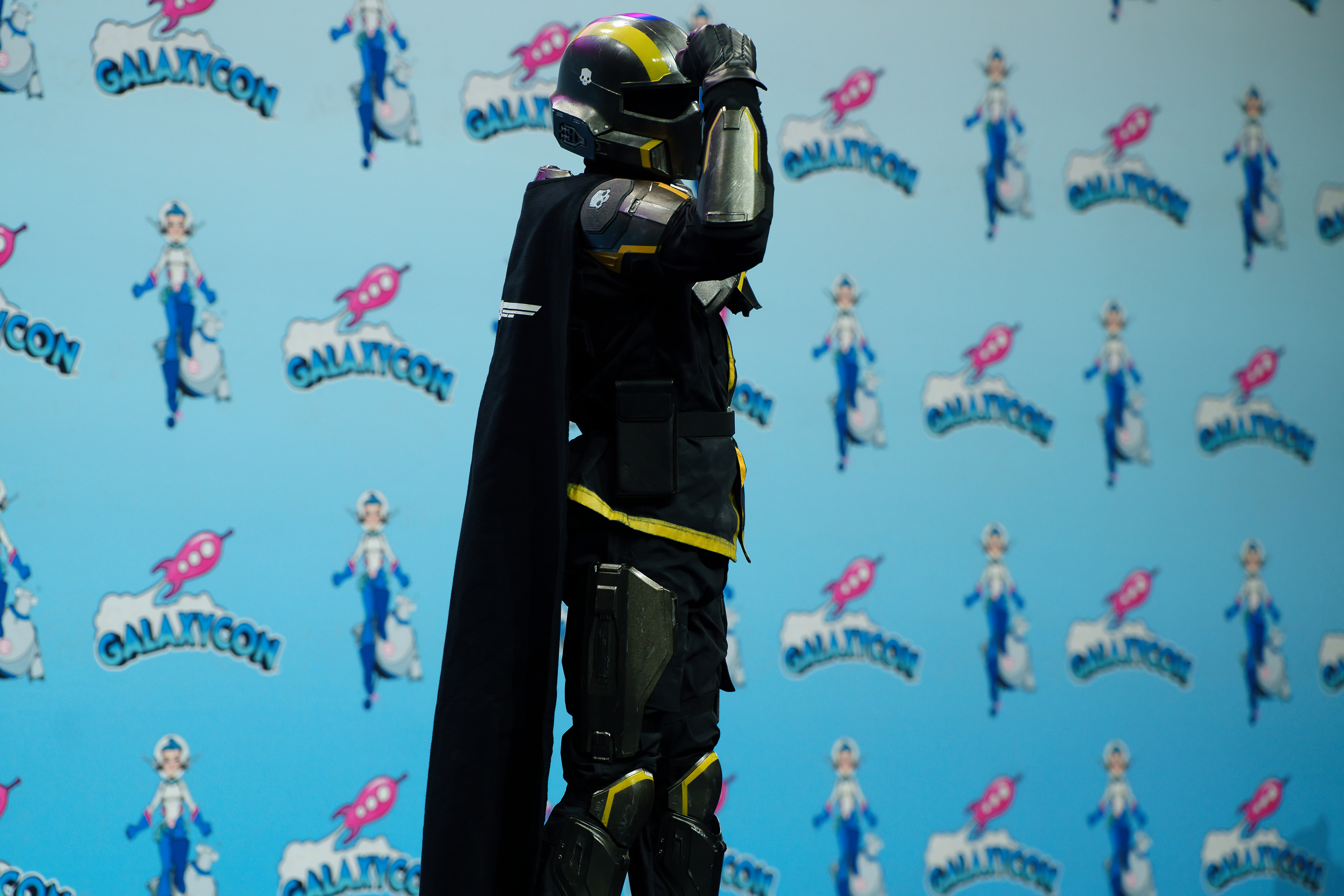
Cosplayer dressed as a Helldiver posing in the Super Earth salute at GalaxyCon 2024.

Arrowhead CEO Johan Pilestedt revealed at the Game Developers Conference in March 2025, the United Nations contacted the development team regarding giving a talk related to the concept of psychological defense against manipulation. Pilestedt stated, "We do it all in fun and good spirits, and we actually try to get people to recognize the science of what is a totalitarian state. If you start wearing the same uniform as everybody else and do salutes constantly, you might be in a totalitarian regime".

On 3 July 2025, Arrowhead Game Studios and Sony Interactive Entertainment announced that the game would be released for the Xbox Series X/S consoles on 26 August 2025. The Xbox version was developed by Nixxes Software, a studio under PlayStation Studios known for its expertise in porting games to other platforms. The release features full cross-platform play, enabling users across Xbox, PlayStation, and Windows to play together. Helldivers 2 is the second game published by PlayStation Studios to be released on the Xbox platform. The release coincided with the launch of Gears of War: Reloaded on the PlayStation 5; the Gears of War franchise had been a Microsoft exclusive since its debut in 2006. Some publications deemed the release of Helldivers 2 on Xbox and Gears of War on PlayStation as further proof of the end of the "console wars".

=== Save The Children donation ===
On 11 June 2024, the game featured a Major Order where players had to choose between liberating planet Marfark to earn a new anti-tank mine Stratagem or planet Vernen Wells to rescue trapped children from the Automatons. Despite Arrowhead's initial expectations being the players would choose the mines, they chose to save the children. As a result, then-CEO Johann Pilestedt made a $4,311 donation to Save The Children in commemoration to the community's efforts.

=== Station-81 game ===
On 9 May 2025, channel "S81-Satcom" was added to the Helldivers 2 Discord server by Arrowhead as an alternate reality game. The original message linked to a YouTube livestream from the perspective of four different satellites orbiting Super Earth, with Station-81 being offline. The goal to reactivate Station-81 was completed by users working together to recalibrate datablocks. This served to reveal the Illuminate's assault on Super Earth, which was caught on Station-81's cameras emerging from the Meridian singularity, before Station-81 would be destroyed.

=== Automaton hack of Helldivers 2 social media ===
On 5 February 2026, the Helldivers 2 accounts on X (formerly Twitter), Instagram, YouTube and Discord were "hacked" by the Automatons, as a way to promote the game's next major update: an offensive by Super Earth towards Cyberstan, the base of the Automatons. These accounts made several posts spreading messages in binary code, as well as changing banners to a parody of the game's cover art but with Automaton units in place of Helldivers.

These hacks extended to dispatches within the game, encouraging Helldivers to defect from Super Earth and issuing fake orders. Additionally, propaganda posters were posted through the hacked accounts, containing a hidden QR code directing players to a secret website containing a hidden message and a countdown timer. When the timer hit zero, a trailer for the "Machinery of Oppression" update was released.

=== Crossovers ===
On 18 December 2024, Arrowhead released a crossover event with the Killzone franchise, releasing downloadable content for players to purchase with in-game currency. On 11 December 2025, Arrowhead announced the return of these items as part of the "Helldivers 2 x Killzone Legendary Warbond" releasing on 18 December 2025. Arrowhead announced that any players who purchased the Killzone items previously, would receive the Warbond for free.

On 12 August 2025, a trailer for the launch of Helldivers 2 on Xbox teased a crossover with Halo 3: ODST. The "Helldivers 2 x Halo: ODST Legendary Warbond" was subsequently released on 26 August 2025.

On 21 May 2026, a trailer for an upcoming Legendary Warbond featuring a crossover with Warhammer 40,000 was announced. The "Helldivers 2 x Warhammer 40,000 Legendary Warbond" was released on 12 August 2026.

== Reception ==
Reception

Aggregate scores
Aggregator	Score
Metacritic	(PC) 83/100 (PS5) 82/100 (XSXS) 88/100
OpenCritic	91% recommend

Review scores
Publication	Score
Digital Trends	4/5
Eurogamer	4/5
Famitsu	30/40
Game Informer	9/10
GameSpot	9/10
GamesRadar+	4/5
Hardcore Gamer	4/5
IGN	9/10
NME	4/5
PC Gamer (US)	86/100
Push Square	9/10
Shacknews	8/10
The Guardian	4/5
VideoGamer.com	8/10

Helldivers 2 received "generally favorable" reviews from critics, according to review aggregator website Metacritic. In Japan, four critics from Famitsu gave the game a total score of 30 out of 40.

Upon release, the game experienced a large influx of players, leading to server and login issues for the first two weeks of release. By the third week of release, the player cap was increased to "a whopping 700,000 concurrent users" according to Wesley Yin-Poole of IGN.

Aaron Bayne of Push Square described the game as "a riotous affair, offering up best-in-class gunplay" and a "truly epic and often cinematic experience, mixed in with one of the best co-op gameplay romps currently available." However, he criticized the game for the server issues and crashes that players experienced after release.

Helldivers 2 has been compared to the 1997 science fiction action film Starship Troopers; both are satirical comedies featuring a militaristic regime fighting against a race of large insectoids.

U.S. Army veteran and journalist Clay Beyersdorfer stated, "That's the trick: Helldivers 2 works because it doesn't glamorize war. It pokes fun at it. It doesn't try to make players feel like elite operators. It makes you feel like a cog in a machine that only half works and is pointed in the wrong direction".

Helldivers 2 has been listed among the best video games of 2024.

=== Sales ===
On February 11, 2024, Johan Pilestedt, then-CEO of Arrowhead Games, announced that Helldivers 2 had sold approximately 1 million units.

Helldivers 2 was the largest launch of any PlayStation Studios game available on PC. Arrowhead stated that the game's success has greatly exceeded their expectations. Following its initial success, Arrowhead Studios announced its intention to scale its studio and team to accelerate its post-launch content plans. Pilestedt reacted to the game's ongoing success by stating that he hopes to see Helldivers become considered as iconic as PlayStation's other intellectual properties such as Uncharted, God of War, and Horizon.

In Europe, the United Kingdom, and Canada, Helldivers 2 was the best-selling game of February 2024. Helldivers 2 remained the best selling game in Canada in April 2024.

By 24 February 2024, the game was estimated to have sold over 3 million units and became the most actively played game on the PlayStation Network, surpassing Call of Duty: Warzone 2.0 and Fortnite. By 15 March 2024, Helldivers 2 was estimated to have sold 8 million units and reached 450,000 concurrent players on Steam. By 5 May 2024, 12 million units of the game had been sold, making it PlayStation's fastest selling video game of all time as well as Sony's most successful Windows title. Game sales crossed 15 million by November 2024.

Helldivers 2 was the third highest selling video game of 2024 in the United States. It was also a top seller and the most played game on Steam in 2024. The game reportedly sold nearly 1 million copies within the first week of its release on Xbox Series X/S.

By 23 October 2025, Helldivers 2 sold in excess of 19 million copies: 12.6 million on Steam, 5.4 million on PlayStation 5, and 1.4 million on Xbox Series X/S.

In January 2026, market data firm Alinea Analytics estimated that over 20 million copies had been sold, with over $700 million earned globally. The firm reported that Helldivers 2 is the highest selling game developed by either Sony or Microsoft since 2023 to also be released on Steam.

=== PSN account controversy ===
At launch, Helldivers 2 did not require PC players to log into a PlayStation Network (PSN) account, allowing players to skip the integration despite a line on startup stating that a PSN account is required. On May 3, 2024, Sony Interactive Entertainment announced that the PC version of Helldivers 2 on Steam would mandate users to sign in with a PSN account, taking effect for new players on May 6, 2024, and required for existing players by June 4, 2024. SIE stated that a PSN login is necessary to "[uphold] the values of safety and security provided on PlayStation and PlayStation Studios games", and that this requirement was not implemented at launch due to technical issues. The announcement was met with criticism. Additionally, many players called out that official documentation from Sony claimed that PSN accounts were optional for games on PC, with this statement changing to an ambiguous "some games" statement after players were directed to contact Sony support by Pilestedt. On 4 May, the listing on Steam was updated to disallow sales to 177 territories where PSN is not available.

Pilestedt apologized for the sudden change, stating on Twitter that "I hope we will make it up and regain the trust by providing a continued great game experience". Arrowhead developers stated that they were on the side of the players and one community manager even called for the player base to negatively review the game on Steam, leading to players review bombing the game; as of 4 May, nearly 53% of all posted reviews were negative, with over 84,000 negative reviews on Steam. Sony announced on May 5, 2024, that they would not be moving forward with the account linking requirements, and promised to work with Arrowhead to find alternate solutions to protect players. Regional restrictions on Helldivers 2 were lifted alongside God of War Ragnarök, Marvel's Spider-Man 2, Horizon Zero Dawn Remastered, and The Last of Us Part II Remastered on June 14, 2025.

=== Accolades ===
Year	Ceremony	Category	Result	Ref.
2024	Golden Joystick Awards 2024	Ultimate Game of the Year	Nominated	
2024	Golden Joystick Awards 2024	Best Multiplayer Game	Won	
2024	Golden Joystick Awards 2024	Console Game of the Year	Won	
2024	Golden Joystick Awards 2024	Best Game Trailer (launch trailer)	Won	
2024	Golden Joystick Awards 2024	Critics' Choice Award	Won	
2024	The Game Awards 2024	Best Ongoing Game	Won	
2024	The Game Awards 2024	Best Community Support	Nominated	
2024	The Game Awards 2024	Best Action Game	Nominated	
2024	The Game Awards 2024	Best Multiplayer Game	Won	
2024	The Steam Awards	Game of the Year	Nominated	
2024	The Steam Awards	Better with Friends	Won	
2024	The Steam Awards	Most Innovative Play	Nominated	
2025	28th Annual D.I.C.E. Awards	Game of the Year	Nominated	
2025	28th Annual D.I.C.E. Awards	Action Game of the Year	Won	
2025	28th Annual D.I.C.E. Awards	Online Game of the Year	Won	
2025	28th Annual D.I.C.E. Awards	Outstanding Achievement in Game Design	Nominated	
2025	28th Annual D.I.C.E. Awards	Outstanding Achievement in Audio Design	Won	
2025	28th Annual D.I.C.E. Awards	Outstanding Achievement in Original Music Composition	Won	
2025	Game Audio Network Guild Awards	Best Audio Mix	Nominated	
2025	Game Audio Network Guild Awards	Best Game Foley	Nominated	
2025	Game Audio Network Guild Awards	Best Game Trailer Audio	Won	
2025	Game Audio Network Guild Awards	Best Main Theme	Won (Note: Tied with Star Wars Outlaws)	
2025	Game Audio Network Guild Awards	Best Original Song ("Helldivers 2 'Super Earth National Anthem'")	Nominated	
2025	Game Audio Network Guild Awards	Best Original Soundtrack Album	Nominated	
2025	Game Audio Network Guild Awards	Best UI, Reward, or Objective Sound Design	Nominated	
2025	Game Audio Network Guild Awards	Creative and Technical Achievement in Music	Nominated	
2025	Game Audio Network Guild Awards	Dialogue of the Year	Nominated	
2025	Game Audio Network Guild Awards	Creative and Technical Achievement in Sound Design	Nominated	
2025	Game Audio Network Guild Awards	Music of the Year	Nominated	
2025	Game Audio Network Guild Awards	Sound Design of the Year	Nominated	
2025	25th Game Developers Choice Awards	Game of the Year	Nominated (Note: Also received honorable mention)	
2025	25th Game Developers Choice Awards	Best Technology	Nominated	
2025	25th Game Developers Choice Awards	Best Design	Honorable mention	
2025	25th Game Developers Choice Awards	Innovation Award	Honorable mention	
2025	NAVGTR Awards 2024	Animation, Technical	Nominated	
2025	NAVGTR Awards 2024	Art Direction, Contemporary	Won	
2025	NAVGTR Awards 2024	Control Design, 3D	Nominated	
2025	NAVGTR Awards 2024	Game, Franchise Action	Nominated	
2025	NAVGTR Awards 2024	Graphics, Technical	Nominated	
2025	NAVGTR Awards 2024	Performance in a Comedy, Supporting (Craig Lee Thomas as Super Earth Spokesperson)	Won	
2025	NAVGTR Awards 2024	Sound Editing in a Game Cinema	Nominated	
2025	NAVGTR Awards 2024	Sound Effects	Won	
2025	NAVGTR Awards 2024	Use of Sound, Franchise	Nominated	
2025	NAVGTR Awards 2024	Writing in a Comedy	Nominated	
2025	21st British Academy Games Awards	Best Game	Nominated	
2025	21st British Academy Games Awards	Animation	Nominated	
2025	21st British Academy Games Awards	Audio Achievement	Nominated	
2025	21st British Academy Games Awards	Game Design	Nominated	
2025	21st British Academy Games Awards	Multiplayer	Won	
2025	21st British Academy Games Awards	Music	Won	
2025	21st British Academy Games Awards	Narrative	Longlisted	
2025	21st British Academy Games Awards	Technical Achievement	Longlisted	
2025	21st British Academy Games Awards	Performer in a Supporting Role (Craig Lee Thomas as Super Earth Spokesperson)	Longlisted	
2025	Golden Joystick Awards 2025	Still Playing Award - PC and Console	Nominated	
2025	The Game Awards 2025	Best Ongoing Game	Nominated	
2025	The Game Awards 2025	Best Community Support	Nominated	
2026	The Steam Awards 2025	Labor of Love	Nominated	
2026	68th Annual Grammy Awards	Best Score Soundtrack for Video Games and Other Interactive Media	Nominated	
2026	22nd British Academy Games Awards	Evolving Game	Nominated	
2026	Golden Joystick Awards 2026	Still Playing Award - PC and Console	Nominated	
2026	The Game Awards 2026	Best Community Support	Pending	

== Film adaptation ==
In January 2025, Sony Pictures announced during Sony's CES 2025 conference that they are working on a film based on the Helldivers games. In December 2025, it was announced that Justin Lin would direct the film from a script by Gary Dauberman. In February 2026, it was announced that Jason Momoa had joined the cast and that the film would be released on November 10, 2027. In June 2026, it was announced that Momoa had exited the film. In September 2026, Alan Ritchson was in talks to star in the film, and it was announced that the film was to be delayed to June 9, 2028.

== Reference in the assassination of Charlie Kirk ==
On 10 September 2025, American right-wing political activist Charlie Kirk was assassinated. The bullet casings, including the bullet used, were emblazoned with various inscriptions; one of the unfired bullets was engraved with the words "Hey fascist! Catch! ↑→↓↓↓". The arrow sequence "↑→↓↓↓", is the input code in Helldivers 2 for calling in the Eagle 500 kg Bomb Stratagem. The incident resulted in the subreddit "r/Helldivers" being locked temporarily due to a surge of related discussions, and some called on Arrowhead Game Studios to respond.
