= Magicka 2 =

2015 video game

- Developer: Pieces Interactive
- Publisher: Paradox Interactive
- Platforms: Windows, PlayStation 4, Linux, OS X
- Release: Windows, PlayStation 4 May 26, 2015; Linux, OS X November 10, 2015
- Genre: Action-adventure
- Modes: Single-player, multiplayer

Magicka 2 is a 2015 action-adventure video game, the sequel to Magicka, for Microsoft Windows, Mac OS X, Linux and PlayStation 4. It was released on May 26, 2015 and was announced at Sony's E3 2014 media briefing with a trailer. Instead of being developed by Arrowhead Game Studios, the title was developed by Pieces Interactive alongside the publisher Paradox Interactive.

== Plot ==
=== Opening ===
The opening of Magicka 2 starts with a backstory, how 1 through 4 wizards from the Order of Magick saved Midgård from certain doom multiple times (the story of Magicka). Due to this success, the Order of Magick decided to expand by founding multiple wizard schools all over Midgård. However, conflict between the schools grew, eventually sparking the Wizard Wars. The aftermath of the wars resulted in many wizards decimated, and those who survived tread the shadows of their former glory. Without wizards destroying the human's way of life, the Golden Age of Man has begun. During this period of calmness, a seer named Nostrir the Soothslayer has prophesied that a child, infused with magick from the magickal residue caused by the Wizard Wars, was born somewhere in Midgård. This very child, once of age, will lead Midgård into a better place, free of suffering. However, the prophecy also told that an opposing force would seek to prevent the child from realizing her power. Vlad, back from his multi-decade vacation, returns to Aldrheim only to find the castle in ruins. Hearing Nostrir's prophecy, Vlad decides to guide 1 through 4 wizards from the ruins of Aldrheim to save the prophesied child.

=== Main story ===
After being treated to a brief tutorial the 1-4 players are instructed by Vlad to find the seer Nostrir and set out towards Crystal Bay, where Nostrir resides. On the way, the player passes through a group of humans celebrating a festival called “Interdependence Day”. The festival grounds are attacked by goblins which the player defeats.

After arriving in Crystal Bay, Vlad informs the players of Nostrirs last known residence. The wizards make their way towards Nostrirs house while fighting of hordes of Goblins and vicious, man-eating crabs. When the wizards arrive at Nostrirs house it is discovered that a group of goblins and orcs are also searching for him but that he no longer resides in his house. After defeating the leaders of the orc and goblin raid, Vlad appears and instructs the wizards to search the caves beneath Crystal Bay for Nostrir.

Venturing through the caves the players discover an underground fortress where Nostrir now resides. After defeating a giant horde of enemy crabs the wizards are allowed entrance and meets Nostrir. Vlad teleports in and asks him where the prophesied child may be found, Nostrir reveals that the child was born in the Vanir higherlands in the clan of chieftess Frida. Before Nostrir can fully reveal who the child is, however, a giant claw appears from a nearby underground lake and pulls him in. Vlad tells the players to venture north into the Vanir Higerlands anyway and find the child.

Continuing to venture through the caves the wizards encounter the Beastkin, a group of aggressive, vegan half human- half animal creatures, and has to fight through them to reach the Higherlands. After exiting through a passageway that leads to the Higherlands the wizards discover a massive army of orcs and goblins presumably heading north to stop the child from realising its power. The wizards make haste having to fight through beastkin, orcs and goblins alike. The wizards then reach a bridge leading into the Vanir's territory, a group of beastkin demand entry into the land as their lands are being destroyed by elves and humans. The Vanir deny them entry and in the ensuing fight the wizards emerge victorious. After finding the chieftess Frida Vlad mediates between the Vanir, who wants to kill the wizards for killing their bridge keepers in the aforementioned fight, and the wizards who wish to find the child. Frida realises that the prophesied child may be her own daughter, Lok.

The wizards continue to head north towards the Vanir village where Lok resides, arriving at the same time as the orcs, under the leadership of the warlady Khan IV the first, and the goblins under the leadership of the shaman Metexas. The wizards manage to defeat warlady Khan with their magic causing the orcs to scatter. After the battle Lok's mentor, Elin, wants to kill the wizards, citing the fact wizards can never be trusted and cause more harm than good. Lok refuses and instead traps the wizards inside a magical crystal ball, also trapping the nearby Metexas in the process.

After being trapped inside the crystal ball Metexas berates the wizards for trusting in Vlad and Nostrir and presents an alternative version of the prophecy where it is the child who endangers the world with her powers. This prophecy is the reason for the orcs and goblins unifying, as they wished to stop the child before it causes to much damage.

One year after being imprisoned the wizards and Metexas are freed by Vlad, who briefs them on what has happened during their year of imprisonment where it appears Metexas' predictions are coming true as the Vanir have since pushed southwards under Lok's leadership and have united humans, elves and dwarves in an alliance under the Vanir. A disgruntled Metexas teleports away and Vlad tasks the wizards with stopping Lok before it's too late.

The wizards then head through the forest towards castle Vanirhall, Lok's base of operations built atop the ruins of Aldrheim. After encountering a group of elves Vlad teleports in front of the wizards to give them another briefing, accidentally blowing their cover and leading to the wizards having to fight their way to Vanirhall.

After arriving to Vanirhall the wizards defeat most of the castles guards before encountering Elin, whom they defeat. The wizards confront Lok, who is initially excited to see them thinking they are still mostly harmless. After sensing that the wizards have killed Elin, she attacks them using a golem she has constructed with her magic. The wizards managed to incapacitate the golem by destroying its magical power reserves and Vlad then appears and uses his magic to trap Lok. After looking around the castle Vlad states that it would make a good new magic school and then teleports away after declaring himself the headmaster. The wizards celebrate their victory before the golem initiates a self-destruct sequence, the screen promptly cuts to black.

== Reception ==
Reception

Aggregate score
Aggregator	Score
Metacritic	PC: 69/100; PS4: 72/100

Review scores
Publication	Score
Destructoid	5.5/10
Game Informer	7.25/10
GameSpot	7/10
GamesTM	6/10
Hardcore Gamer	4/5
IGN	7.7/10
PC Gamer (US)	79/100
PCGamesN	6/10
VentureBeat	55/100
VideoGamer.com	7/10
Slant Magazine	2/5

Magicka 2 received mixed reviews from critics upon release. On Metacritic, the game holds score of 69/100 for the PC version based on 37 reviews, and 72/100 based on 18 reviews for the PlayStation 4 version.

IGN awarded the game a score of 7.7 out of 10, saying "Though it may occasionally test your patience, Magicka 2's charm and depth make it a really fun co-op experience". PCGamesN awarded it 6 out of 10, saying "At the moment it's functional, sometimes fun, but only something that should really be considered if you've got three chums who are guaranteed to play with you.". GameSpot awarded it 7 out of 10, saying "Put Magicka 2 next to its 2011 predecessor and you've got a before-and-after comparison straight out of a weight-loss advertising campaign."
