= The Showdown Effect =

2013 video game

- Developers: Arrowhead Game Studios, Pixeldiet Entertainment
- Publisher: Paradox Interactive
- Director: Johan Pilestedt
- Producers: Axel Lindberg (Arrowhead); Mats Anderson (Pixeldiet)
- Designers: Emil Englund; Johan Pilestedt
- Artists: Carl Brännström; Malin Hedström
- Engine: Autodesk Stingray
- Platforms: Microsoft Windows, Mac OS X
- Release: 5 March 2013
- Genre: Action
- Mode: Multiplayer

The Showdown Effect is an action game developed by Arrowhead Game Studios in cooperation with Pixeldiet Entertainment and published by Paradox Interactive for Microsoft Windows and Mac OS X. The game was released on 5 March 2013 via digital distribution on Steam.

An enhanced version of the game, The Showdown Effect: Reloaded was developed by GIII Holdings and released on 5 March 2024 via Steam.

The game was inspired by exploitation films of the 1980s and 1990s, with characters being one of multiple protagonists of these films. Most of the interaction between the characters of the game consists of "one-liners". These one-liners are part of the game's mechanics. The game is set in a futuristic Tokyo in 2027.

== Development ==
The game was announced in February 2012 under the codename "Project JFK", and was unveiled during the Game Developers Conference 2012. The Showdown Effect was developed by Arrowhead Game Studios and co-developed by Pixeldiet Entertainment, their first commercially released game. The Showdown Effect was created with the BitSquid video game engine. Production began in late 2011, with a small part of the Arrowhead team working on it. In January 2012 the rest of the team joined the production of The Showdown Effect.

On 8 February 2012, Paradox Interactive has announced that three new games would be revealed at GDC that year, including code name "Project JFK", which would later become The Showdown Effect. On 6 March 2012, the game was revealed to be a "2.5D multiplayer action game where players will participate in deadly battles to win fame."

In an interview with Joystiq, Emil Englund, the game designer of Arrowhead Game Studios, said the idea for The Showdown Effect came when they were working together with Paradox Interactive in creating a game similar to Super Smash Bros.. Moreover, the designer Johan Pilestedt, of The Escapist, said he considered the game a mix between Super Smash Bros. and GoldenEye 007. Pilestedt continued, commenting on some movies that were used for inspiration during the creation of the game, especially in the graphics: "It is close to the work of Tarantino. His films are so violent, but are exaggerated. The blood is not real blood, it's just red water. These exploitation films are a major influence on the violence present in Showdown. " Pilestedt also mentioned to the interviewer that animations in the film Ghost in the Machine and in Team Fortress 2 served as inspiration.

Englund explained the significance of the name of the game, The Showdown Effect: "[...] is the moment where two people meet and they just know they have the look and know they have to battle." Speaking with Kotaku Australia, Fredrik Wester, CEO of Paradox Interactive, commented on the characters of the game, saying that they are all based on characters from action films of the 1980s such as John McClane in Die Hard, Roger Murtaugh in Lethal Weapon or "any movie 1980 with Arnold Schwarzenegger." Each character was created to resemble an archetype of the time, but never tried to imitate a single character.

During development, it was decided to not produce a console version or gamepad support for computers. According to Pilestedt, after testing several different mechanical controls, decided to stay only with the keyboard and mouse because "if you have high damage and you hit all the bullets, the game goes to be about who pulled the trigger first." The version presented during the PAX East of 2012 had full support gamepad, which was removed after discussions about the game focus more on quick reflexes.

Those who registered through the official website, or those who pre-purchased the game, gained access to the closed beta on 1 February 2013.

The game was delisted from Steam on 14 August 2018.

== Reception ==
Reception

Aggregate score
Aggregator	Score
Metacritic	67/100

Review scores
Publication	Score
Destructoid	8.5/10
Edge	5/10
Eurogamer	6/10
GameStar	72%
Hardcore Gamer	3/5
IGN	6/10
PC Gamer (UK)	70%
PC Games (DE)	64%
Digital Spy	3/5

The game received "average" reviews according to the review aggregation website Metacritic.
