= Gauntlet (2014 video game) =

2014 video game

- Developer: Arrowhead Game Studios
- Publisher: Warner Bros. Interactive Entertainment
- Director: Axel Lindberg
- Designers: Emil Englund; Magnus Johansson; Nils Hansson Bjerke
- Programmers: Peter Lindgren; Kalle Sjöström; Emil Ernerfeldt
- Artists: Robert Tatnell; Carl Brännström; Pontus Karlsson
- Composers: Andreas Kinger; Erasmus Talbot; Johan Nilsson
- Series: Gauntlet
- Engine: Autodesk Stingray
- Platforms: Microsoft Windows; PlayStation 4
- Release: Windows: WW: September 23, 2014; AU: September 24, 2014; Slayer Edition: WW: August 11, 2015; PAL: August 12, 2015 (PS4)
- Genre: Dungeon crawl
- Modes: Single-player, multiplayer

Gauntlet is a hack and slash dungeon crawl video game developed by Arrowhead Game Studios and published by Warner Bros. Interactive Entertainment. A reboot of the Gauntlet series, it was released for Microsoft Windows in September 2014. Gauntlet was re-released for both Windows and PlayStation 4 as Gauntlet: Slayer Edition in August 2015.

== Gameplay ==
The player takes the role of one of four heroes, Thor the Warrior, Thyra the Valkyrie, Merlin the Wizard, or Questor the Elf (one player per character) allowing up to four-player multiplayer co-op gameplay. The dungeons to be explored are part defined maps and part procedurally generated.

== Reception ==
Reception

Aggregate score
Aggregator	Score	
Aggregator	PC	PS4
Metacritic	68/100	71/100

Review scores
Publication	Score	
Publication	PC	PS4
Destructoid	8/10	N/A
Eurogamer	6/10	N/A
Game Informer	7/10	N/A
GameRevolution	5/10	N/A
GameSpot	6/10	N/A
GameTrailers	7.9/10	N/A
Hardcore Gamer	4.5/5	N/A
IGN	6.8/10	7.1/10
Push Square	N/A	8/10
Retro Gamer	75%	N/A
RPGamer	2.5/5	N/A
Shacknews	8/10	N/A
The Escapist	3.5/5	N/A
Metro	5/10	N/A

Both the original Gauntlet and Slayer Edition received "average" reviews according to the review aggregation website Metacritic. Gaming website Shacknews stated that "so far, it looks like Gauntlet properly captures much of the spirit that made the 1985 arcade game so much fun", while also stating that the game isn't very intuitive in terms of figuring out the unlocked mechanics as you progress through the game. Chris Brown of New Zealand website Gameplanet said that the PC version "scratches an itch I didn't realise I had", finding it "simple, but not brainless" but also "fun as hell"; he also highlighted the user interface in their preview build as "awkward". In comparison to the 30-year-old original, Destructoid opined "the game isn't a true recreation; it's more Arrowhead's ideal take on it", finding that "while the content may feel sort of new, nothing's ever really that fresh with Gauntlet. And that's probably just the way that fans would want it." Dave Rudden of IGN praised the same PC version's four-player co-op while criticizing the repetitive gameplay and low replay value. Daniel Tack of Game Informer found the boss battles enjoyable but insufficient, and the PC version's level design bland and repetitive, describing it as a "sleepy, automated button mash". Michael P. Huber, of GameTrailers, praised the same PC version's four distinct classes while also criticizing the lack of varied environment and replay value.

Joshua Vanderwall of The Escapist gave the PC version three-and-a-half stars out of five, saying, "Arrowhead made a very true-to-source Gauntlet game, no doubt, but the source is 30 years old, and could use some modern accouterments. Gauntlet is as much fun as it has ever been, but it'll get old fast for those who still remember slogging through the original." Jed Pressgrove of Slant Magazine gave it an above-average review, saying that it was "nothing more than a modest cycle of action, never selling itself as a self-important well of features." However, David Jenkins of Metro gave it five out of ten, saying, "It's certainly not the worst Gauntlet revamp there's ever been, but there's too little substance or variety to satisfy either new fans or old."
