= Radiant Entertainment =

American video game developer

Radiant Entertainment, Inc.
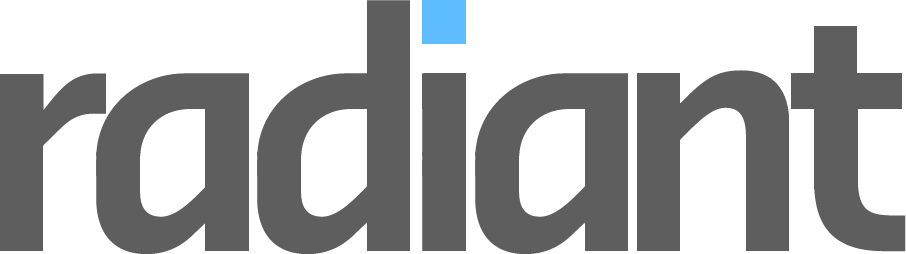
- Company type: Subsidiary
- Industry: Video games
- Founded: 2011; 14 years ago
- Founders: Tom Cannon; Tony Cannon
- Headquarters: Los Altos, California, US
- Key people: Tom Cannon; (president, CEO); Tony Cannon; (CTO)
- Products: Rising Thunder; Stonehearth
- Parent: Riot Games (2016–present)

Radiant Entertainment, Inc. was an American video game developer based in Los Altos, California. Founded by twin brothers Tom and Tony Cannon in 2011, the company has developed Stonehearth, a city-building game, which was released in July 2018 after three years in early access. Radiant was acquired by Riot Games in March 2016 and Radiant's second game, Rising Thunder, was canceled during its alpha phase. The game was later replaced by a freeware "community edition" in January 2018.

== History ==
Radiant Entertainment was founded by twin brothers Tom and Tony Cannon. They had previously launched the Evolution Championship Series (Evo), an esports tournament for fighting games, and developed GGPO, a fighting game middleware platform. They were most recently employed as software engineers for VMware but quit their jobs in 2011 to develop video games full-time, founding Radiant in Los Altos, California. The studio launched a crowdfunding campaign via Kickstarter for Stonehearth, a city-building game, in 2013, initially seeking US$120,000. The funding concluded one month later with a total of $751,920 pledged by backers. Stonehearth was made available in early access in June 2015 and released in July 2018, although many development goals from the Kickstarter campaign were left unfulfilled. In a June 2015 round of seed funding, Radiant raised $4.5 million from investors Andreessen Horowitz, London Venture Partners, and General Catalyst.

Radiant's second game, Rising Thunder, was announced in July 2015. It was a fighting game created by Seth Killian, who had joined the studio after departing Santa Monica Studio. A "technical alpha" was opened to a handful of players at the end of the month and to the general public in August. On March 8, 2016, Radiant announced that it had been acquired by Riot Games, the developer of League of Legends, for an undisclosed sum. Alongside the acquisition, Rising Thunder was canceled and consequently shut down later that month. The development team behind Rising Thunder was re-allocated to a new, unannounced project. A freeware version of Rising Thunder, dubbed the "community edition", was released in January 2018 with open-source servers.

== Games developed ==
Year	Title	Platform(s)
2015	Rising Thunder	Windows
2018	Rising Thunder: Community Edition	Windows
2018	Stonehearth	macOS, Windows
