= A Game of Dwarves =

2012 video game

- Developer: Zeal Game Studio
- Publisher: Paradox Interactive
- Platform: PC
- Release: NA: October 23, 2012; EU: April 19, 2013
- Genres: Real-time strategy, dungeon management game
- Mode: Single-player

A Game of Dwarves is a dwarf-themed real-time strategy dungeon management game developed by Zeal Game Studio and published by Paradox Interactive in 2012-2013. A PlayStation 3 version was in development but was cancelled before release.

== Gameplay ==
The gameplay has been compared to the Dungeon Keeper game series.

== Reception ==
Reception

Aggregate score
Aggregator	Score
Metacritic	60/100

Review scores
Publication	Score
Destructoid	6/10
Gamekult	4/10
GameSpy	2.5/5
Jeuxvideo.com	8/20
MeriStation	6.5/10
PC Gamer (UK)	66%
The Escapist	3/5

The game received "mixed or average" reviews according to the review aggregation website Metacritic. Reviews of the game criticized its quality, saying A Game of Dwarves was a pale imitation of Dungeon Keeper and "astonishingly ugly".
