= Arrowhead Game Studios =

Swedish video game developer

Arrowhead Game Studios AB
- Type: Private
- Industry: Video games
- Founded: 2008; 18 years ago in Skellefteå, Sweden
- Founders: Robin Cederholm; Emil Englund; Malin Hedström; Johan Pilestedt; Anton Stenmark
- Headquarters: Stockholm, Sweden
- Area served: Worldwide
- Key people: Shams Jorjani (CEO); Johan Pilestedt (president and CCO)
- Number of employees: ~140 (2025)
- Website: arrowheadgamestudios.com

Arrowhead Game Studios AB is a Swedish video game development company, established in 2008 by students at Luleå University of Technology.

== History ==
While studying at Luleå, Johan Pilestedt and Emil Englund led the development of Magicka, Arrowhead's first game. It won the Game of the Year award at the 2008 Swedish Game Awards. In 2009, a contract was made with Paradox Interactive, leading to the game's wide release in 2012.

After the release of Magicka, Arrowhead planned further games, intent on banning crunch. From 2011 to 2012, the company relocated to Stockholm. In 2013, The Showdown Effect, a 2.5D multiplayer action game inspired by 1980s and 1990s action movies, was published by Paradox, and in Gauntlet, a co-op dungeon crawler, was published by WB Games. In 2015, Helldivers, a top-down shooter, was published by Sony Computer Entertainment; a sequel was released in 2024, also by Sony Interactive Entertainment.

On 22 May 2024, Pilestedt announced that he had become Arrowhead's chief creative officer so that he could fully focus on game development. He was replaced as CEO by Shams Jorjani, a longtime business associate.

== Games ==
	Title	Genre(s)	Publisher(s)	Platform(s)	Ref
2011	Magicka	Action-adventure	Paradox	Windows	
2013	The Showdown Effect	Action	Paradox	Windows, OS X	
2014	Gauntlet	Hack and slash, dungeon crawl	WB Games	Windows, PS4	
2015	Helldivers	Shoot 'em up	Sony Interactive Entertainment	Windows, PS3, PS4, Vita	
2024	Helldivers 2	Third-person shooter	Sony Interactive Entertainment	Windows, PS5, Xbox Series X/S	

== Awards ==
- Magicka won the Game of the Year award at the Swedish Game Awards 2008.
- Helldivers was nominated for "Action Game of the Year" and won for "Handheld Game of the Year" at the 19th Annual D.I.C.E. Awards held by the Academy of Interactive Arts & Sciences.
- Helldivers 2 won multiple awards in 2024, including two times “Best Multiplayer Game”, “Best Console Game” and “Best Ongoing Game” and has been nominated for the “Ultimate Game of the Year” at the Golden Joystick Awards, as well as for the “Game of the Year” at the Steam Game Awards.
