= Warhammer: The End Times – Vermintide =

2015 video game

Warhammer: The End Times - Vermintide
- Developer: Fatshark
- Publisher: Fatshark
- Director: Anders De Geer
- Producer: Mårten Stormdal
- Designers: Victor Magnuson; Mats Andersson
- Writers: Magnus Liljedahl; Matt Ward; Andy Hall
- Composer: Jesper Kyd
- Series: Warhammer Fantasy
- Engine: Autodesk Stingray
- Platforms: Microsoft Windows; Xbox One; PlayStation 4
- Release: Microsoft Windows October 23, 2015; Xbox One, PlayStation 4 October 4, 2016
- Genre: Action
- Mode: Multiplayer

Warhammer: The End Times – Vermintide is an action game developed and published by Fatshark. It was released for Microsoft Windows on October 23, 2015 and PlayStation 4 and Xbox One on October 4, 2016. The game is set in the Warhammer Fantasy universe. It is multiplayer-only, and its structure is similar to Valve's Left 4 Dead series. Set during an apocalyptic event called the End Times, players can team up with three other players to fight against the Skaven, a race of rodent-like creatures, in the city of Ubersreik. At the end of each match, the players are given the opportunity to roll dice, which determine the weapons they will receive as reward.

The development of the game began in early 2013 in Fatshark, after the company came to an agreement with Games Workshop. Games Workshop also collaborated with them to ensure the game is faithful to the Warhammer franchise. The game was self-published as they wanted to maximize their creative freedom.

The game received generally positive reviews upon release. PC Gamer named it the best game of the Penny Arcade Expo. Critics liked the gameplay, progression system, visuals and map design, while criticizing the balancing issues and occasional technical issues. The game was supported by both paid and free downloadable content and sold 300,000 copies within a month and over 2,000,000 copies by the end of 2017. A sequel titled Warhammer: Vermintide 2 was released in 2018.

== Gameplay ==
A gameplay screenshot of the game, showing the player character using a crossbow to kill the Skaven, a race of rodent-like monstrous creatures, outside the city of Ubersreik

Warhammer: End Times – Vermintide is a co-op-focused first-person shooter action video game set within the Warhammer universe. Set during an apocalyptic event called the End Times, players can team up with three other players to fight against the Skaven, a race of rodent-like creatures, in the city of Ubersreik. Players choose from five different heroes: Victor Saltzpyre (Witch Hunter), Markus Kruber (Empire Soldier), Bardin Goreksson (Dwarf Ranger), Kerillian (Wood Elf Waywatcher) and Sienna Fuegonasus (Bright Wizard). The five heroes have different skills; some are more proficient in performing ranged attacks using firearms, arrows, or magic, while others favor melee weapons like swords. At the end of each level, players will be awarded loot, such as trinkets and weapons. They also gain experience points to unlock weapons and are given the chance to roll dice. The dice players roll will determine the new gadgets they will receive. Different characters have different loot, and at high difficulty, the amount of loot rewarded is greater.

The game's design is similar to that of Left 4 Dead, in which players are tasked to fight off hordes of enemies in order to progress from one side of a level to another. There are several types of Skaven featured in the game. The most common type can be easily killed but they often come in a large swarm as to overwhelm players. The more elite ones include Skaven that are protected with heavy armor, Skaven that are equipped with toxic bombs, and even the massive Rat Ogre. The artificial intelligence featured in the game is dynamic, with hostile enemies spawning randomly. This mechanic is known as the "conflict director". The game also features a real-time narrative, which slowly unfolds as players progress through levels. Each character has their own personality and attitude towards the major events in the game.

== Plot ==
In the Imperial city of Ubersreik, an army of Skaven from Clan Fester stage a surprise attack and quickly overrun the city. Five heroes: Markus Kruber the Imperial soldier, Victor Saltzpyre the witch hunter, Bardin Goreksson the dwarf ranger, Sienna Fuegonasus the fire witch, and Kerillian the wood elf, are caught up in the attack and are forced to band together to survive the Skaven onslaught. They take shelter in an inn owned by Franz Lohner, who assigns them their missions while wagon master Olesya Pimenova helps transport them around the city. The five heroes conduct numerous missions against the Skaven, such as warning Ubersreik of the invasion, sabotaging the Skaven war effort, and securing supplies for the human resistance forces. Eventually, the heroes are able to confront Grey Seer Rasknitt, the leader of Clan Fester and seemingly defeat him. However, when the heroes prepare to leave Ubersreik, the Skaven attack the inn, forcing the heroes to head underground where they find Rasknitt preparing to activate a machine. Rasknitt successfully activates the machine, which opens a portal that the heroes fall into to suffer an unknown fate.

== Development ==
Warhammer: End Times – Vermintide was developed by Swedish company Fatshark, who had previously developed War of the Roses. The team had wanted to make a Warhammer game since they played Warhammer Fantasy Battle in 2004, but they lacked the team to do so. The studio was originally very small, but its size grew shortly afterwards after the closure of Amuze, in which a lot of its employees joined Fatshark. After the company's expansion, the team decided to approach Games Workshop for the Warhammer license in 2013, and their offer was accepted. Production of the game began in the beginning of that year.

According to Fatshark, having Games Workshop as a coordinator for their project was a "dream come true" for them. In order to be faithful to the franchise, the two companies worked closely together so as to ensure that their creative visions would not contradict with each other, and to confirm that the game had a "Warhammer feel". They also decided to self-publish the game, so that they can maximize their creative freedom. Vermintide was also the first game where the entire team at Fatshark worked together, and it enjoyed a much longer pre-production and production period than their previous projects.

Also, there are so many of them, which makes them the perfect enemy for a co-op game. We feel like it's really important that you're up against impossible odds at all times so you really need to cooperate

— Victor Magnuson, gameplay designer of Vermintide

The company had experimented with games like Escape Dead Island and Krater, and realized that among all the genres, the team are most capable in developing multiplayer games with co-operative gameplay, and they decided to specialize in it. Vermintide's main focus is co-op, and most gameplay features are built to enhance the experience and its replayability. According to the team, it is a game about surviving the apocalypse in the End Times. Therefore, they incorporated elements from Left 4 Dead in which players must work together to achieve success. Loot is given to players only when the main quests are completed. The team made this choice because they thought they should not award players for their mistakes. Enemies are designed to spawn in vast number, as the team thought that such large quantity can help these enemies to become the "perfect enemy for a co-op game". However, despite being co-op focused, players cannot play as typical fantasy characters like healers. Therefore, Fatshark decided to name these characters "heroes" instead of "classes".

The game's gameplay is a combination of melee gameplay and gunplay, which the team thought can craft a "visceral" experience for players. In order to prevent players from rushing through levels and pick on every enemy, they included enemies that should be evaded, such as some of the Elite units, and gameplay segments where players should carry out stealth. They hoped that through this approach, players can think and plan their moves accordingly and ultimately work together to prevent getting killed, as well as temporarily breaking the flow of actions.

The game was announced on February 5, 2015, with the release of an announcement trailer. The game was released for Microsoft Windows on October 23, 2015. The game was released for PlayStation 4 and Xbox One on October 4, 2016.

=== Expansions ===
On December 3, 2015, Fatshark released the first content update titled Sigmar's Blessing for free to all owners of Vermintide. The update added 40 new weapons in a new tier called Veteran, as well as the Shrine of Solace which acts as a new way for players to spend their Salvage Tokens and gain weapons. Patch 1.1.5 was released on January 26, 2016, and added the ability to re-roll traits as well as upgrade their percentage to activate. Both of these uses the Salvage Tokens as their currency.

Patch 1.2, titled Last Stand, was released on March 7, 2016. It added a new endgame mode sharing the title of the update, Last Stand, in which the players battle an unending tide of vermin. As time goes on, the waves of enemies become bigger and stronger, increasing the difficulty. The players are rewarded by picking up Badges which spawn after certain waves around the level. The game mode was released for free along with one compatible level, titled Town Meeting. Town Meeting takes place in an area named Von Jungfreudsplatz which players have visited in a previous level.

Additional DLC was released over time, eventually totaling 12 new missions and 6 new weapons. The first released in March 2017, titled Schluesselschloss. It added 1 new map compatible with the Last Stand game mode. The second, titled Drachenfels, was released May 2016, and added three new missions and two new weapons. It was followed by Karak Azgaraz in December 2016, which added another three missions and two weapons. The fourth paid DLC, Stromdorf, added another two missions, one weapon, and one boss (Chieftain Krench) in May 2017. The fifth and final paid DLC, Death on the Reik, also added two missions and one weapon and was released in December 2017. The final mission for the game, titled Waylaid, was released in a free update in February 2018. The mission bridges the gap between the first and second games; the heroes end up captured at the end of it by the Skaven, setting the stage for their breakout and subsequent campaign in the sequel.

=== Soundtrack ===
We wanted the score to sound like it was performed by a Skaven band on acoustic instruments mangled by some mad Skaven scientist in the dark ages. It's very different from anything I have written in the past

— Jesper Kyd, composer of Vermintide

The soundtrack of the game was composed by Danish composer Jesper Kyd. On September 26, 2017 the soundtrack was released by Sumthing Else Music Works, containing 36 tracks. Kyd, in an interview with The Sound Architect Podcast, stated that "It's a dynamic, raw and violent score that belongs to Vermintide's dark medieval setting," going on to say "We wanted the score to sound like it was performed by a Skaven band on acoustic instruments mangled by some mad Skaven scientist in the dark ages. It's very different from anything I have written in the past." Kyd also composed the soundtrack for the sequel.

== Reception ==
Reception

Aggregate score
Aggregator	Score
Metacritic	PC: 79/100; PS4: 73/100; XONE: 77/100

Review scores
Publication	Score
Destructoid	7.5/10
Eurogamer	Recommended
Gamekult	6/10
GameSpot	7/10
GameStar	80/100
IGN	7/10
Jeuxvideo.com	15/20
PC Gamer (US)	90/100

PC Gamer played the game at PAX Prime 2015 and awarded it the "Best game of PAX", stating that "What's surprising about Vermintide, and absolutely central to its appeal, is how fresh it feels despite its deep similarities to Left 4 Dead." Upon release, the game was met with positive responses.

The game's co-operative nature received acclaim. Ian Birnbaum from PC Gamer called it the best co-operative multiplayer game to date since Left 4 Dead 2. He added that players staying together is essential, saying that it has successfully encouraged players to co-operate with each other. Dan Whitehead called the game "a thrilling twist on Left 4 Dead's co-operative action" but he was disappointed that the studio had not taken further risks to shape the game's identity. Joe Parlock from Destructoid echoed similar thoughts, noting the game's similarity with the Left 4 Dead franchise. While Mike Fahey writing for Kotaku described the game as "Left 4 Dead, only with rats. Left 4 Rats." Rob Zacny thought that the game was competent, but he thought that the game was not executed well, saying that it does not achieve the same height as the Left 4 Dead series does. He also added that the game lacks tension. A 6/10 review in the Metro said the game "shamelessly copies the more specialised enemies from Left 4 Dead" and wished more had been done to differentiate the enemies from their Left 4 Dead counterparts.

The game's gameplay was praised. Birnbaum thought that the combat system is simpler than Fatshark's previous game, but he added that the game's simplicity is one of its strengths, as it enhances the "solidity" of the combat system. He also thought that all the characters featured in the game are unique, and none of them are boring. Parlock also praised the five classes, writing that their power feel very balanced. He also liked the game's combat, which he thought was involved, albeit simple. Whitehead thought that the game is satisfying and very fun to play. The progression system was also praised by him, as he considered that it has successfully given players motivation to play the game. Zacny also praised the progression system, saying that it encourages players to try some of the game's more difficult missions and segments while Adam Smith for Rock, Paper, Shotgun called the persistent character building "a game-changer". Scott Butterworth from GameSpot also admired the progression system, saying that it adds twists to the co-operative formula. However, he noted that characters in the game move too slow when compared to the fast action featured.

The atmosphere and environment were described as "phenomenal" by Cecilia Fjällström writing in a 9/10 review for Gamereactor. She went on to say "There is no mistaking that this is a game that lives and breaths Warhammer." The Metro praised the level-design and the quality of the graphics.

However, the game was criticized for its balancing issues. Whitehead noted that some of its maps are frustratingly difficult, and that the upgrades featured in the game do not correspond with the gadgets players own. Whitehead, Smith, and Parlock noted that the game suffered from occasional bugs and glitches as well as other kinds of technical problems and connectivity issues. Butterworth disliked the game's artificial intelligence, calling it unreliable. The Metro also criticised the game's AI, particularly the behaviour of the Skaven which sees them simply "acting exactly like zombies."

It has sold over 300,000 copies as of November 11, 2015. Fatshark also announced that the game will be supported by multiple downloadable content, with the first one being Sigmar's Blessing, which adds new loot. It was released on December 3, 2015. On April 1, 2016, Fatshark announced that the game's sales surpassed 500,000 units and by the end of 2017, 2,000,000 copies had been sold.

== Sequel ==
A sequel titled Warhammer: Vermintide 2 was unveiled in late 2017. It was released on March 8, 2018.
