= Bloodsports.TV =

2015 video game

- Developers: Fatshark; Toadman Interactive
- Publisher: Fatshark
- Platform: Microsoft Windows
- Release: March 30, 2015 (PC)
- Genre: MOBA
- Mode: Multi-player

Bloodsports.TV is a MOBA hero defense video game for Microsoft Windows developed by Toadman Interactive and Fatshark. The game is a spin-off from Fatshark's 2012 role-playing game Krater: Shadows Over Solside, set in the same universe.

Bloodsports.TV was released in 2015 via the Steam digital distribution platform.

== Gameplay ==
Bloodsports.TV features a departure from the squad-based real-time strategy gameplay of Krater: Shadows Over Solside, and replaces it with that of an MOBA. The player takes control of one of a number of Gladiators, alone or together with up to 4 other players, and loads into an arena. After a short time, waves of enemies will come out and the Gladiators will have to defeat them. After all outlaws are defeated, the players have a short time to restore their health, purchase upgrades, and do side-objectives. Then the next waves comes. At waves 4, 7, and 10 there is a special boss wave.

The game features 5 difficulty levels (Amateur League, Pro League, Master League, and Apocalympics) with several sub-difficulties for each level. The game also features 4 different game lengths; 4 waves, 7 waves, 10 waves, and Endless Mode.

== Reception ==
Polygon said “Bloodsports.TV turns slaughtering a village into a fun reality show”.
