= Battlefleet Gothic: Armada =

2016 video game

- Developer: Tindalos Interactive
- Publisher: Focus Home Interactive
- Director: Romain Clavier
- Designers: Romain Clavier; Tristan Clavier
- Programmer: Dimitri Chambonneau
- Artists: Edouard Boccard; Baptiste Doux
- Writer: Ross Watson
- Composer: Doyle W. Donehoo
- Series: Warhammer 40,000
- Engine: Unreal Engine 4
- Platform: Microsoft Windows
- Release: WW: April 21, 2016
- Genre: Real-time tactics
- Modes: Single-player, multiplayer

Battlefleet Gothic: Armada is a real-time tactics video game developed by Tindalos Interactive and published by Focus Home Interactive. It is set in the fictional universe of Warhammer 40,000, and is specifically an adaptation of the miniature wargame Battlefleet Gothic by Games Workshop.

== Gameplay ==
Players will control fleets representing one of six factions (the Imperium's Imperial Fleet, Chaos Undivided, Orks Pirates, Eldar Corsairs, the Imperium's Space Marines and the Tau Empire) and battle for control of the Gothic sector of space. From the fastest destroyers and frigates to the gigantic battleships, players will customize all aspects of their ships: weaponry, defense and support sub-systems, etc. each customization affecting the performances of the ship and the special abilities available during battle. There are two types of primary weapons: Macro Weapons (including Eldar starcannons and Ork Gunz), which are more accurate at close range; and Lance Weapons (including Ork Zzzap), which are precise and penetrate armor but have a slower rate of fire. Other weapons include Torpedo Launchers and Hanger Launch Bays.

Mission include wiping out enemy fleets or flagships, stealing data from flagships, escorting transport vessels, protecting defense stations, and reaching bombardment positions to help ground forces.

Experience and promotions will also be awarded to ships as they survive bouts of war.

== Plot ==
Set during the Gothic War, also known as the 12th Black Crusade in the Warhammer 40,000 lore, the game follows Admiral Spire of Battlefleet Gothic as he and the Imperium fight against the forces of Chaos led by Warmaster Abaddon.

The prologue begins when Spire, then a captain, investigates an abandoned space station only to learn it has been taken over by Chaos forces and a large Chaos fleet is heading to the Gothic Sector. Spire's ship escapes and he informs his superiors, the head of the Imperial Navy of the Gothic Sector, Lord Admiral Cornelius von Ravensburg, and Inquisitor Horst of the Imperial Inquisition, of the upcoming invasion. After confirming that Spire is telling the truth, Horst promotes Spire to Admiral to lead Battlefleet Gothic to help the forces of the Imperium.

In addition to fighting the forces of Chaos, Spire's fleet also combats Ork Pirates, Eldar Corsairs, and rogue Imperial Navy vessels in the Gothic Sector. As the campaign goes on, the forces of Chaos seize control of Blackstone Fortresses for their own purpose, eventually taking over 3 of the 6 fortresses in the system; at one point, Spire has the option to accept or deny an alliance with the Eldar. At one point, one of the planets in the Gothic Sector is completely destroyed by the Planet Killer, a battleship that serves as the flagship for Abbadon the Despoiler, the chaos warmaster.

Eventually, the 3 captured Blackstone fortresses link their beams to overload a star and destroy it along with the imperial held planet in the system. Fearing Schindelgeist is next, the Imperial Navy makes a last stand at the system. Spire's fleet manages to rout the Planet Killer from the system but the Fortresses begin to fire on the star. Captain Abridal and his Overlord-Class Battle Cruiser, The Flame of Purity sacrifices himself, rushing into the focal point of the fortress beams and causing a feedback effect that disables them. With that defeat, the Chaos forces are forced to retreat from the sector and Admiral Spire is proclaimed a hero before preparing for his next campaign.

== Development ==
Battlefleet Gothic: Armada was announced by Focus Home Interactive on January 16, 2015. The game was developed using Epic Games' Unreal Engine 4. A Space Marines faction, separate from the Imperial Fleet, is available as downloadable content. A limited edition Early Adopters Box version was available to those that preordered the game, including the Space Marine faction from the start.

=== Downloadable content ===
The first downloadable content (DLC) added the fleet of the Space Marines, released on June 21, 2016. The second DLC added the fleet of the Tau Empire, released on September 29, 2016.

== Reception ==
Reception

Aggregate score
Aggregator	Score
Metacritic	77/100

Review scores
Publication	Score
IGN	7.1/10
PC Gamer (US)	80/100

Battlefleet Gothic: Armada has received generally favorable reviews with a 77/100 on Metacritic. IGN awarded it a score of 7.1 out of 10, saying "Battlefleet Gothic: Armada's promising space tactics are bogged down by excessive obscure details." PC Gamer awarded it 80%, saying "A tubthumping tribute to the 40K universe, with perfectly grim design. Multiplayer definitely needs work on its balance though."

== Sequel ==
A sequel, titled Battlefleet Gothic: Armada 2, was released on January 24, 2019. It follows the Gathering Storm setting and follows Admiral Spire once again as he battles the forces of Abbadon the Despoiler and other rising powers in the stellar systems surrounding Cadia, as the Imperium reels itself from the aftermath of the destruction of the Imperial forces on Cadia. It features the Imperium divided into 3 fleet types, the Imperial Navy, the Adeptus Astartes/Space Marines, and the Adeptus Mechanicus. It also sees the return of Chaos, Orks, Aeldari/Eldar (divided into 3 fleets: Corsairs, Asuryani/Craftworld Aeldari, and Drukhari/Dark Eldar), and the Tau (Protector and Merchant Fleets). It also features the Necrons and the Tyranids, both of which have their own campaign, along with the Imperium and Chaos (DLC is required for Chaos campaign). The sequel add 2 new classes of vessels, Grand Cruisers and Titans.
