= War of the Vikings =

2014 video game

- Developer: Fatshark
- Publisher: Paradox Interactive
- Director: Anders De Geer
- Designer: Daniel Platt
- Programmer: Robin Hagblom
- Artists: Robert Berg; Mikael Hansson
- Writer: Magnus Liljedahl
- Engine: Autodesk Stingray
- Platform: Microsoft Windows
- Release: 15 April 2014
- Genre: Hack and slash
- Mode: Multiplayer

War of the Vikings was a multiplayer hack and slash video game developed by Fatshark and published by Paradox Interactive in 2014. It is a follow-up to 2012's War of the Roses.

The game was announced at the Paradox Platypus Homecoming Event in Sydney in August 2013. The announcement notice said that "War of the Vikings is a new standalone entry into the War-franchise that will pull players into the brutal and bloody Viking Age, challenging them to design a personalized warrior and sack England as a mighty Norseman – or defend it as a brave Saxon. Built on the same close quarter combat-tech as War of the Roses, War of the Vikings delivers the next generation of Paradox's close quarter combat focused brands that moves the setting to the Viking Age. All of these factors enabled us to create a game experience that has an increased intensity, improved accessibility, and more intuitive combat experiences ensuring you're always presented with interesting choices."

War of the Vikings was released on 15 April 2014. In October 2014, Paradox Interactive announced they would stop development of the game after two patches to increase stability and solve some major issues. In February 2017, the servers were shut down and the game is not playable anymore.

== Gameplay ==
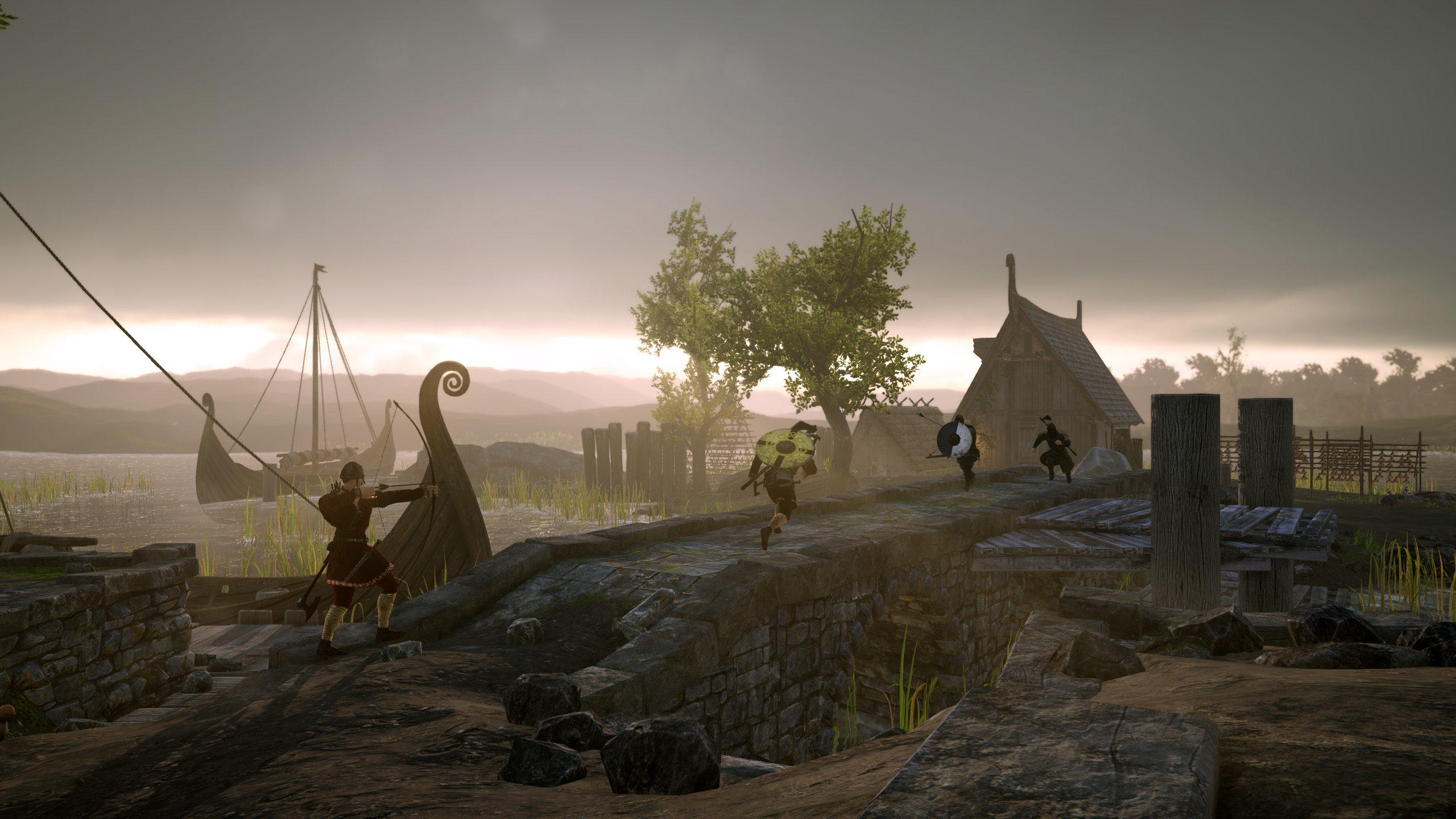
Saxons fight Vikings at the docks

War of the Vikings puts the player in control of a single soldier fighting for either the Vikings or the Saxons. The player will be able to define the game character profile by choosing everything from armour style, heraldry, shield paintings, beards, armour, weaponry and perks. The game plays mainly in a third-person viewpoint and is a multiplayer game.

The player can choose from 5 character classes:. Warrior (Medium Class): An all-around warrior with medium armor, with a sword, shield, and throwing axes. Champion (Heavy Class): Heavily armored, with charged up attacks whose two-handed axe deals a lot of damage. Skirmisher (Light Class): A ranged fighter who picks off enemies with a longbow, but carries a light axe for close-quarter melee combat. Shield Maiden (Medium Class): A defensive front liner with spear, javelin and the Snowflake shield. Berserker (Light Class): A fast, dual wielding fighter with two swords.

Melee attacks are divided into right and left side swings and overhead strikes. Each melee weapon also has a special attack which does a large amount of damage if it connects but will leave the attacker vulnerable while the animation plays.

There are 5 game modes, each of which can be played by up to 64 players. Arena is a single life game mode in a small map, where, when a player is 'downed' they can be killed by the attacker hitting them where they lay or can be resurrected by a team mate. Pitched Battle is a larger version of a single life game mode, suitable for clan battles. TDM game mode is where the player has the ability to respawn, however each full death counts towards the score (a resurrected player does not count as a death for the game score). Conquest is a multiple life game mode where the teams battle to advance one objective at a time. Domination is another multiple life game mode where all objectives are available and must be held simultaneously to win.

== Development and release ==
War of the Vikings was developed by Swedish developer Fatshark. During development, the team conducted research on Viking history by consulting with scholars. These scholars had specialties in areas including the weapons, gear, culture, language, and lifestyle of both Vikings and Saxons. They stated that this was in order to get away from stereotypical depictions of Vikings.

War of the Vikings was made available through Steam's Early Access program.

== Reception ==
The game's reception was mixed with a 62 rating on Metacritic.
