= Battlefleet Gothic: Armada 2 =

2019 video game

- Developer: Tindalos Interactive
- Publisher: Focus Home Interactive
- Director: Romain Clavier
- Programmer: Dimitri Chambonneau
- Artist: Edouard Boccard
- Writer: Matt Ward
- Composer: Doyle W. Donehoo
- Series: Warhammer 40,000
- Engine: Unreal Engine 4
- Platform: Windows
- Release: WW: January 24, 2019
- Genre: Real-time tactics
- Modes: Single-player, multiplayer

Battlefleet Gothic: Armada 2 is a real-time tactics video game developed by Tindalos Interactive and published by Focus Home Interactive. It is a sequel to Battlefleet Gothic: Armada from 2016. It is set in the fictional universe of Warhammer 40,000, and is specifically an adaptation of the miniature wargame Battlefleet Gothic by Games Workshop.

== Gameplay ==
All 12 playable factions from the original tabletop game are featured in the game: Imperial Navy, Space Marines, Adeptus Mechanicus, Craftworld Aeldari, Aeldari Corsairs, Drukhari, Chaos, Orks, Necrons, Tyranids, T'au Merchant Fleet and T'au Protector Fleet. The game features four narrative campaigns, Imperium, Chaos, Necrons and Tyranids, with the imperial campaign having the player control all three Imperial factions. New to the sequel is that the campaigns are playable in co-op multiplayer.

== Release ==
Battlefleet Gothic: Armada 2 was announced by Focus Home Interactive on January 24, 2018. In August 2018, the game was delayed from the original release date of September 2018 to January 2019. An expansion pack, Chaos Campaign, was released on June 24, 2019.

== Reception ==
Reception

Aggregate score
Aggregator	Score
Metacritic	77/100

Review scores
Publication	Score
4Players	72/100
PC Gamer (US)	84/100
The Games Machine (Italy)	6.5/10
Strategy Gamer	3/5

Battlefleet Gothic: Armada 2 has received generally favorable reviews with a 77/100 on Metacritic.

Tom Senior of PC Gamer awarded it a score of 84 out of 100, and said the game is "an absorbing space strategy game" and "one of the most authentic attempts to capture the grandiosity of Warhammer 40,000".

Daniele Dolce of The Games Machine said: "There's a lot of content here, but the many technical issues, the poor balancing between the twelve factions, and the many features missing from its direct predecessor make Battlefleet Gothic: Armada 2 an underwhelming experience."

Alexander Williams of Strategy Gamer summarized: "It's a solid but not exceptional middle-of-the-road game with some UI hang-ups but a wide variety of factions and a solid amount of the old 40K charm."

The game was included in Eurogamer's list of "The best Warhammer 40k games to play in 2022". PC Gamer listed the game eight on its list of best Warhammer 40,000 games, calling it "a hell of a spectacle".
