= Hamilton's Great Adventure =

2011 video game

- Developer(s): Fatshark
- Publisher(s): Fatshark
- Platform(s): Microsoft Windows, PlayStation 3, Android
- Release: Microsoft Windows: WW: May 31, 2011; PlayStation 3: WW: August 23, 2011
- Genre(s): Puzzle video game
- Mode(s): Single-player, Offline Co-Op (up to 2 players)

Hamilton's Great Adventure is a puzzle game for Microsoft Windows, PlayStation 3 and Android. The game was the first self-published title from the Swedish developer Fatshark, which was considered a surprising change in the developer's choice of gameplay and genre since it focused more on single-player elements with a relatively low learning curve.

Hamilton's Great Adventure was released on May 31, 2011 via the Steam digital distribution platform, and was later released on August 23, 2011 for PlayStation 3. On December 17, 2012, the game was released under the title Hamilton's Adventure TDH for Android.

== Gameplay ==
Hamilton's Great Adventure is a puzzle adventure platforming game in which the player assumes the role of the explorer Ernest Hamilton and his bird Sasha. The player primarily controls Hamilton, while occasionally switching to his bird Sasha (in co-op, the second player controls Sasha). The game is split up into shorter levels, in which the objective is to collect keys and reach the exit. Sasha is able to reach switches that are off the main path, clearing obstacles for Hamilton.

The game has over 60 levels stretching over numerous locations, such as the Jungles of the Amazon and the Mountains of Himalaya. The enemies that Hamilton encounters during his expeditions include hungry Piranhas, flying Exocets, slow but unstoppable Golems and cunning Agents.
