= Fatshark =

Swedish video game developer

Fatshark AB
- Type: Subsidiary
- Industry: Video games
- Founded: 2008
- Founder: Martin Wahlund; Rikard Blomberg; Joakim Wahlström; Johan Jonker
- Headquarters: Stockholm, Sweden
- Products: War of the Roses; Warhammer: Vermintide series; Warhammer 40,000: Darktide
- Number of employees: 180
- Parent: Tencent (2021–present)
- Website: www.fatshark.se

Fatshark AB is a Swedish video game development studio based in Stockholm. It develops its own games and has also acted as a subcontractor for several AAA titles for PC and consoles.

== History ==
Fatshark originated from a company called Northplay, which subcontracted for various Swedish companies between 2003 and 2008. The company is best known for its involvement with the PlayStation 3 and the Xbox 360, developing Bionic Commando Rearmed 2 and versions of its PC game Lead and Gold: Gangs of the Wild West for both.

In January 2019, Tencent acquired about a 36% stake in Fatshark in a deal worth approximately 500 million kr (around US$56 million). Later, in January 2021, it was reported that Tencent had acquired a majority stake in the company valued at around 2.2 billion sek (around US$260 million).

== Games ==
Title	Year	Platform(s)	Refs.
Lead and Gold: Gangs of the Wild West	2010	Microsoft Windows, PlayStation 3	
Bionic Commando Rearmed 2	2011	PlayStation 3, Xbox Live Arcade	
Hamilton's Great Adventure	2011	Microsoft Windows, PlayStation 3, Android	
Krater	2012	Microsoft Windows	
War of the Roses	2012	Microsoft Windows	
War of the Vikings	2014	Microsoft Windows	
Escape Dead Island	2014	Microsoft Windows, PlayStation 3, Xbox 360	
Bloodsports.TV	2015	Microsoft Windows	
Warhammer: End Times – Vermintide	2015	Microsoft Windows, PlayStation 4, Xbox One	
Warhammer: Vermintide 2	2018	Microsoft Windows, PlayStation 4, Xbox One, Xbox Series X/S	
Warhammer 40,000: Darktide	2022	Microsoft Windows, PlayStation 5, Xbox Series X/S	
