= Matt Ward (game designer) =

British author and board game designer

Matt Ward is a British author and miniature wargaming designer, who is best known for his work with Games Workshop on the Warhammer Fantasy Battles, Warhammer 40,000 and The Lord of the Rings Strategy Battle Game systems. He was also a frequent contributor to the magazine White Dwarf during his first stint at the company.

In May 2014, Ward left Games Workshop and worked for a time as a novelist. He returned to Games Workshop in 2016; his two-year hiatus was allegedly due to him receiving many death threats over his writing.

== Bibliography ==
- A Matter of Belief (novella, 2014)
- Brazen Dreams (short story, 2015)
- The Bargain (short story, 2015)
- Frostgrave: Second Chances: A Tale of the Frozen City (novel, 2017)
- Frostgrave: Oathgold: A Tale of the Frozen City (novel, 2018)
- Legacy of Ash (novel, 2019)
- Legacy of Steel (novel, 2020)
- Legacy of Light (novel, 2021)
- The Darkness Before Them (novel, 2023)
- The Fire Within Them (novel, 2024)
- The Lie That Binds Them (novel, 2025)

=== Games Workshop ===
- Army Book: Daemons of Chaos (2008)
- Warhammer 40,000 Rulebook, 5th Edition (2008)
- Codex: Space Marines (2008)
- Codex: Blood Angels (2010)
- Warhammer Fantasy Rulebook, 8th Edition (2010)
- Codex: Grey Knights (2011)
- Army Book: Dark Elves (2012)
- Army Book: Daemons of Chaos (2013)

==== Video games ====
- Warhammer: End Times – Vermintide (2015)
- Warhammer: Vermintide 2 (2018)
- Battlefleet Gothic: Armada 2 (2019)
- Warhammer 40,000: Darktide (2022)
