= Warhammer: Vermintide 2 =

2018 video game

- Developer: Fatshark
- Publisher: Fatshark
- Directors: Anders De Geer; Robin Hagblom
- Producers: Erika S. Kling; Robert Bäckström
- Designer: Joakim Setterberg
- Programmers: Peter Nilsson; Joakim Wahlström
- Artist: Arvid Nilsson
- Writers: Matt Ward; Magnus Liljedahl
- Composer: Jesper Kyd
- Series: Warhammer Fantasy
- Engine: Autodesk Stingray
- Platforms: Microsoft Windows; PlayStation 4; Xbox One; Xbox Series X/S
- Release: Microsoft Windows; 8 March 2018; Xbox One; 11 July 2018; PlayStation 4; 18 December 2018; Xbox Series X/S; 3 December 2020
- Genre: Action
- Modes: Single-player, multiplayer

Warhammer: Vermintide 2 is a 2018 first-person action video game developed and published by Fatshark. It is the sequel to 2015's Warhammer: The End Times – Vermintide. Vermintide 2 was released for Windows on 8 March 2018, for Xbox One on 11 July 2018, for the PlayStation 4 on 18 December 2018, and for the Xbox Series X/S on 3 December 2020. A spiritual successor, Warhammer 40,000: Darktide, was released in 2022.

== Gameplay ==
Warhammer: Vermintide 2 is a co-op-focused action game experienced from a first-person perspective. Set in the Warhammer Fantasy fictional universe, players battle cooperatively against the Chaos army and a race of rat-men known as the Skaven. The game features five different characters to play as. These characters are divided into 15 (20 with DLC) different careers, each with a unique set of skills and abilities. After players complete missions, they receive rewards through a randomized loot system.

The base game comes with 13 missions, over 20 enemy types, and over 50 weapons.

== Plot ==
The game is set in the Warhammer Fantasy universe during the early days of the End Times. The game follows the Heroes of Ubersreik from the first game against the Skaven hordes of Clan Fester and their new allies, the Rotbloods (a Chaos Warband dedicated to Nurgle, the Chaos God of Disease and Decay). The expansion, "Winds of Magic", also introduced the Beastmen, a herd of Chaos mutated humanoids, in search of an object known as the 'Herdstone'.

=== Story ===
Following the events of the first game, Grey Seer Rasknitt (antagonist of the first game who was presumed dead and leader of Clan Fester) has successfully captured the five Heroes of Ubersreik. Without the interference of the heroes, the city of Ubersreik fell to the forces of Clan Fester. Rasknitt has since ordered the construction of a massive portal known as the Skittergate, a portal which will allow the Chaos Champion Bödvarr Ribspreader and his Rotblood army easy access to the border-city of Helmgart. However, the Skittergate intermittently fails, preventing Bödvarr from summoning his entire army. When the Skittergate disastrously fails to activate again, the resulting destruction frees one of the heroes, Markus Kruber, from captivity. He fights his way through the Skaven lair and reunites with the rest of the heroes: Victor Saltzpyre the witch hunter, Bardin Goreksson the dwarf ranger, Sienna Fuegonasus the fire witch, and Kerillian the wood elf.

They escape the lair and are transported to a ruined keep where they meet up with the rest of their allies: Franz Lohner (a former innkeeper who directs the heroes' missions) and Olesya Pimenova (a witch who creates the bridge of shadows, the heroes' main method of transportation). Reunited, the heroes and their allies work together to stop the combined forces of Skaven and Chaos. They first slay the sorcerer lord Burblespue Halescourge, who attempted to enact a ritual to unleash a massive plague upon Helmgart. Next, they defeat The Skaven warlord Skarrik Spinemanglr, who had set up a base in a fallen dwarf hold. Enraged by the heroes' continuous interference, Bödvarr sends the majority of his forces to discover the heroes' keep and eliminate them. However, this leaves his war camp lightly defended. The heroes attack Bödvarr's war camp and slay him in an arena.

With Rasknitt's allies dead and his forces depleted and falling into infighting, Lohner states that the time is now to destroy the Skittergate and Rasknitt once and for all. He informs them that they need to activate the Helmgart Skittergate and travel through it to Norsca, the frozen tundra that separates the Old World from the Chaos Wastes. Once there, the heroes proceed to destroy the Norscan Skittergate and return to Helmgart. Rasknitt appears and summons his Stormfiend, Deathrattler, and combats the heroes. After a vicious fight, Rasknitt is at last slain. The lair and the Skittergate collapse, whilst the heroes escape back to the keep.

== Development and release ==
Vermintide 2 was developed by Swedish video game studio Fatshark. Vermintide 2 was announced in August 2017. The game's worldwide reveal occurred on 17 October 2017. The game was released for Windows on 8 March 2018. The game was released for the Xbox One on 11 July 2018 and is available at no cost to Xbox Game Pass subscribers. The game was released on the PlayStation 4 on 18 December 2018.

== Expansions ==
The game has significantly increased in size since release due to a stream of both free and paid downloadable content. Soon after the game's successful release, Fatshark expressed the desire to continue to develop the game at least into 2023.

Two new missions were made available through purchase of the "Shadows over Bögenhafen" DLC in August 2018. A second DLC titled "Back To Ubersreik" adds an additional four missions and five weapons, and was released December 2018. An extra mission, "A Quiet Drink", was released for free in celebration of the game's one-year anniversary in March 2019. The mission is set during a night off for the heroes, where their social gathering at a nearby pub is interrupted by an ambush of Skaven. The Ubersreik Five fight them off while joking with each other and attempting to find more ale. It features a unique mechanic where each hero has to balance their alcoholic content; not drinking enough will cause a debuff, but drinking too much will cause the hero to pass out and have to be revived by a teammate.

A third DLC, the game's first proper expansion titled "The Winds of Magic" released in August 2019 for PC; though was delayed for consoles. The expansion brought with it the introduction of six new enemy types in a separate faction, the Beastmen, who are in search of an artifact known as the "Herdstone". The new expansion also introduced five more weapons, a challenge mode known as Weaves (which remixes the base game's levels with new features and hazards), a new difficulty by the name of Cataclysm, a new non-Weave map, and raised the level cap. The expansion received mixed reviews due to lackluster reception to the new Weaves mode, technical issues with the Beastmen enemies (later patched), balancing changes, and its price (released at $20, it was twice as expensive as the previous DLCs and five times as expensive as any of the career DLCs). The second season of the expansion, originally planned for December 2019, was pushed back to 2020 in order to assure quality testing. This second season introduces 'Lohner's Emporium of Wonders', which is a cosmetic shop that allows players to purchase cosmetics using a new in-game currency known as Shillings which is earned from doing content in the game. The second season also introduces a quick play mode for Weaves as well as balance changes to the mode, and three new missions revisiting the Drachenfels (with a unique boss in the third mission) release sequentially from January to March 2020, bringing the total of new missions in the expansion to four (these three missions, titled "The Curse of Drachenfels", were free for all owners of the game).

The fourth major DLC, the game's second expansion, was titled "The Chaos Wastes" and released for PC in April 2021. The expansion added five weapons, sixteen maps (collectively exceeding the size of the base game's maps), and a new roguelike game mode with randomized level composition and variable buffs and challenges enacted on both the players and the enemies. Weapon progression is separate from the main game mode, as equipment must be upgraded with tokens found within the Chaos Wastes. The story concerns the Ubersreik Five making an expedition into the main base of Chaos, the titular Wastes, in an attempt to use the power of the Citadel of Eternity to beseech more benevolent deities to aid them in their battle. Most of the content is free for owners of the game, with only the weapons being paid content in a separate bundle called "Forgotten Relics."

On November 8th, 2022, the first map of the "A Treachorous Adventure" update, "Trail of Treachery" released, with the follow-up map "Tower of Treachery" releasing on March 28th, 2023.

4 Maps have been released as part of the free "Karak Azgaraz" update. 3 of these maps, released on June 13, 2023, are remastered versions of the Vermintide 1 DLC maps, with the final map, "A Parting of the Waves" releasing on April 11th, 2024, and adding a new enemy to the game, the Chaos warrior with Shield.

Each of the five heroes have received a new career via DLC. Each career comes with two new weapons, a new ability, and a skill tree. The first was Markus Kruber's melee-focused "Grail Knight" class, released in June 2020. The second was Bardin's crank-gun toting "Outcast Engineer", released in November 2020. The third was Kerillian's magic-wielding "Sister of the Thorn" class, released in June 2021. The fourth was Saltzpyre's hammer-swinging and divinely-protected "Warrior Priest" class, released in December 2021. The fifth was Sienna's corrupted, scythe-wielding "Necromancer" class, released October 2023.

In November 2024, Vermintide 2 experienced a surge in popularity, attracting 500,000 new players during the launch week of its Versus PvP mode. Fatshark celebrated the milestone with major discounts on the base game, alongside the announcement of the free "Verminous Dreams" DLC, releasing on December 9, 2024. The DLC introduces a new level, updates to the Versus mode, and a seasonal event, further expanding the game’s content and appeal.

== Reception ==
Reception

Aggregate score
Aggregator	Score
Metacritic	(PC) 82/100 (XONE) 83/100 (PS4) 81/100

Review scores
Publication	Score
Destructoid	8/10
Eurogamer	Recommended
Game Informer	8/10
IGN	8/10
PC Gamer (US)	80/100
USgamer	4/5

The game received generally positive reviews from critics according to review aggregator platform Metacritic.

Tom Marks, writing from IGN, wrote positively about the game, comically praising it on the creative forms of dismemberment that the players can participate in against the "ratmen", one of the primary antagonists of the game, and lack of microtransactions, which he compares favorably against Star Wars: Battlefront II. PC Gamer declared the title the best cooperative game of 2018. Destructoid called it "an improvement over its predecessor" and praised the "beautifully designed sprawling levels, more varied enemy types, an addictive loot system, and a whole lot of character skills to try out" Steven Messner of PC Gamer praised the game's visceral melee combat and level design, calling them "feverishly fun", although he criticized its matchmaking issues and confusing RPG progression systems.

The game sold over 500,000 copies in four days after the initial PC release. Within 11 days of the PC release, it had exceeded the lifetime revenue of the first Vermintide. It had sold over 1,000,000 copies four weeks after the PC release. By the end of 2019, it had sold 2 million copies. In November 2025, developer Fatshark announced that the game had reached over 25 million lifetime players following years of post-launch support and a free-to-keep promotional event.

=== Accolades ===
Year	Award	Category	Result	Ref.
2018	Golden Joystick Awards	Best Co-operative Game	Nominated	
2018	Golden Joystick Awards	PC Game of the Year	Nominated	
2018	Golden Joystick Awards	Xbox Game of the Year	Nominated	
2018	Titanium Awards	Best Action Game	Nominated	
2019	Nordic Game Awards	Nordic Game of the Year	Nominated	
2019	Nordic Game Awards	Best Game Design	Nominated	
2019	Nordic Game Awards	Best Audio	Nominated	
