= War of the Roses (video game) =

2012 video game

- Developer: Fatshark
- Publisher: Paradox Interactive
- Director: Anders De Geer
- Producers: Gordon Van Dyke; Mika'il Yazbeck
- Designers: Mårten Stormdal; Joakim Setterberg
- Artist: Mikael Hansson
- Writer: Magnus Liljedahl
- Composer: Linus Söderlund
- Engine: Autodesk Stingray
- Platform: Microsoft Windows
- Release: 2 October 2012
- Genres: Action, hack and slash
- Mode: Multiplayer

War of the Roses is a 2012 multiplayer action hack and slash video game developed by Fatshark and released by Paradox Interactive. It is set during the Wars of the Roses which took place in England during the 15th century. It was released on 2 October 2012. War of the Roses was well received for its extensive customisation enabling character configurations to be tailored to very specific tastes and for its original "control scheme to tackle a new kind of combat with the aim of creating a completely different experience". The game shut down on 28 February 2017.

A follow-up, War of the Vikings, was released in 2014, but was shut down in 2017.

== Gameplay ==
War of the Roses puts the player in control of a single, customizable soldier fighting for either the House of Lancaster or the House of York. The game plays mainly in a third-person viewpoint and is a multiplayer game. There are three different types of weapons which the player can equip at a single time: primary, secondary, and a dagger.

The player starts with a pre-made melee character, the footman, but will quickly unlock a pre-made Guardsman (originally this was a crossbowman), longbowman and footknight. The pre-made characters have a competitive set-up and are viable characters to play. However, there are also 8 custom slots to unlock which can be customised with weapons, weapon modifiers, armour and perks of the player's choice. At higher levels, horses can be unlocked to allow a cavalry class.

Players can change their selected characters within a round and can modify the profiles of the custom classes between rounds.

The hitboxes are quite precise and the damage is calculated based on whether the hit strikes armour of various materials or flesh and which part of the weapon strikes.

A defeated player may be killed outright or simply 'downed' in which state they can be killed off with an execution move, revived by a teammate or choose to respawn. As with most aspects of the game each choice is a risk/reward scenario.

Once dead a player can choose to respawn in a respawn location for the team or on a 'squad leader' if the player has selected a squad.

There are currently four game modes to choose from. One is a standard team deathmatch game mode. The objective of Conquest is to conquer checkpoints in order. Each team starts at their home spawn points and moves towards the enemy spawn points. Conquering a checkpoint unlocks the next in the sequence. Checkpoints are conquered by standing close to the flag; the more team members are in place, the faster the point is captured. Coloured letters indicate the status of each checkpoint. A "pitched battle" is a single life mode in which the winning team has the last man standing. After a server-set time, the battle area shrinks, forcing the remaining players into combat. The Assault game mode has Lancastrians attempting to take over defensive positions held by the Yorkists. Each map has a series of checkpoints to be taken within a limited time. If the checkpoint is taken the attackers get an increase in time to take the next checkpoint. The game ends when the Lancastrians take the final checkpoint or the Yorkists hold out for the allotted time.

There is also a coat of arms maker that allows substantial customization. The arms are shown on shields and armour and allow players to recognize each other in battle.

On 6 February 2013, a free to play version of War of the Roses was released on the Steam digital distribution platform. This trial version includes access to most online servers, enabling trial players to play alongside existing players, whether paid or trial, but private servers may opt out of allowing trial players to join. The trial version limits players by disallowing any unlocks, giving access only to the game's base classes and weapons. Trial players are limited to only two of the game modes, TDM and Conquest, and gain experience and gold at 80% of the full rate, which increases to normal rate if the full game is purchased using the same account. Trial Players also do not have access to the Battleground trainer, so there is no tutorial for Trial players.

=== Competitive play ===
War of the Roses had a competitive scene with both duel based and clan match based competitions.

The first War of the Roses tournament was held while the game was still in alpha at DreamHack Summer 2012 in Elmia, Jönköping, Sweden. The final was held on the DreamArena Extreme stage on 17 June 2013 and shown on DreamHack TV. The winning team shared a prize purse of US$5000 and headsets from Plantronics.

War of the Roses was added as an unofficial event at the Roses Tournament for 2013. The match between the two universities was streamed by Paradox Interactive with live commentary from John Rickne, Community Producer at Paradox, and Matt Hoving, Streaming Producer at Paradox.

A community run competition, The Eurocup was run during spring 2013 with a unique in-game helmet provided as prize for the winning team.

== Development ==
War of the Roses was announced at Gamescom on 17 August 2011 when Paradox Interactive revealed that the game codenamed 'Project Postman' would be a multiplayer action game based on the Wars of the Roses and developed by Fatshark.

There was originally expected to be a single-player campaign, but time constraints meant this was reduced to a game tutorial.

Considerable attention had been paid to ensuring the historical accuracy of War of the Roses. During development, Mårten Stormdal of Fatshark and Gordon Van Dyke of Paradox travelled to England to research the period. They visited battle sites and towns and were given special access behind the scenes at the Royal Armouries Museum, Leeds.

War of the Roses had an early access week from 25 September 2012 for those who had pre-ordered.

The official release date was 2 October 2012; the game launch was celebrated with a live stream hosted by Senior Producer Gordon Van Dyke.

On 3 October 2012, Paradox Interactive announced the formation of a permanent franchise team for War of the Roses which would be led by Executive Producer Gordon Van Dyke.

On 15 October 2012, Paradox Interactive announced new free content, including weapons, armour, maps and a new game mode. 'Content updates would automatically add new items to be acquired in the game. The system is designed to reward players who have invested a lot of playing hours into the game and items will be immediately available for players to redeem though accumulated in-game currency. For those who are too impatient, there are also options to purchase in-game currency to secure content.'

On 21 November 2012, Paradox Interactive launched the new game mode, called "Pitched Battle", and the new weapons and armour with a live stream event. 'The update introduces a wealth of new armaments to every knight's arsenal, including the Kingmaker sword, a finely crafted piece of steel brandished by legendary English nobleman Richard Neville, otherwise known as Warwick the Kingmaker. A new suit of heavy armour will also be available to choose with different paint options to customize one's fearsome look. One new helmet, four new visors, and seven new weapons, including the gothic mace, the halberd, and the horn-spanned crossbow, will also join the fray.'

On 19 December 2012, Paradox Interactive launched their 'Winter has Arrived' DLC, with a live stream event. This brought new armour, two new snow-covered maps and new weapons including the Dagger and Sword of Mary for Christ's Mass, inspired by medieval depictions of the Virgin Mary, laden with holy symbols. Both weapons were available from 21 December 2012, at a special holiday price, but they reverted to an extremely high price thereafter.

On 23 January 2013, Paradox Interactive launched the Gallowglass Mercenary Pack, yet another free DLC, adding new armor and weapons to the game, designed in the style of Scottish mercenaries from the Middle Ages.

On 27 February 2013, Paradox Interactive launched the 'Outside the Law' free content update, with new armour, new weapons including fire arrows and another new map, a lush, green forest. This was accompanied by a free to play weekend and a livestream.

On 8 March 2013, Paradox Interactive released the only paid DLC for War of the Roses, the "BRIAN BLESSED VO" pack which replaces the existing in-game announcer with a vocal performance recorded especially for War of the Roses by British actor Brian Blessed.

On 21 March 2013, Paradox Interactive relaunched the game as a premium version called War of the Roses: Kingmaker with more new weapons and armour. It also launched a new game mode, Assault, in which Lancastrians attempt to take over positions held by Yorkists. It was accompanied by the additions of full controller support and support for Steam's "Big Picture" mode. Again the Executive Producer Gordon Van Dyke presented a live stream to display the new additions to the game.

On 19 June 2013, Paradox Interactive added new content with the Guns of Burgundy, adding a new weapon type, the handgonne, to the game. There is also a new map, Ravenspurn, which is available for all game modes and new weapons and armour.

On 22 July 2013, Paradox launched the 'sneak teaser trailer' for a new game in the War of the Roses brand.

On 31 July 2013, Paradox Interactive added new content with the Italian & Hanseatic patch, adding more new weapons and armour.

On 2 August 2013, Paradox Interactive announced sign ups for the alpha version of the new game from the War of the Roses team. On 6 August they revealed the game to be War of the Vikings

On 23 January 2014 at the Paradox Convention in Miami (Florida), Paradox Interactive announced they were setting up a new studio - Paradox Arctic in the north of Sweden (Umeå) - to take over responsibility for maintaining War of the Roses. The studio is headed by Mattias Wiking (formerly at Grin and Starbreeze).

On 2 October 2014, Paradox Interactive announced that they were stopping development on War of the Roses, and the sequel game War of the Vikings.

== Reception ==
Reception

Aggregate score
Aggregator	Score
Metacritic	(PC) 73/100

Review scores
Publication	Score
Eurogamer	8/10
GameSpot	7.5/10
GamesRadar+	4/5

War of the Roses received mainly positive review scores. It received a score of 73 on Metacritic out of 100. Eurogamer touted the game for its "freshness" and innovation. Strategy Informer gave the game a score of 8 out of 10, noting its enjoyability. However, the review also noted its fairly steep learning curve. Elder Geek also noted the steep learning curve but pointed out that this was because success at the game is skill based rather than equipment dependent.

The Guardian listed it as one of the best games to play in autumn 2012 saying that "the visuals are astonishing".

Kotaku apparently found the learning curve more friendly saying "If you like the idea of multiplayer shooters, though, but are sick of the steep learning curve and instant deaths, you should definitely give War of the Roses a shot."

PC Gamer was less enthusiastic about the game, calling War of the Roses "A slight but fun third-person medieval melee game. It's definitely different, but needs more bulking out."

Good Game gave it 8 and 8.5 out of 10. "I feel like I have been waiting for this game for a long, long time. I haven't had this much medieval bashing fun since the days of Rune. It just ticks all the right boxes for me, it's community focused, rewards teamwork, there's rich strategy and leaderboards coming too".
