= Lead and Gold: Gangs of the Wild West =

2010 video game

- Cover
- Developer: Fatshark
- Publisher: Paradox Interactive
- Engine: Diesel
- Platforms: Microsoft Windows; PlayStation 3
- Release: Windows: NA: April 8, 2010; EU: May 14, 2010; PlayStation 3: EU: April 22, 2010; NA: May 4, 2010
- Genre: Third-person shooter
- Mode: Multiplayer

Lead and Gold: Gangs of the Wild West is a team-based third-person shooter multiplayer video game. It was developed by Fatshark and published by Paradox Interactive and released in 2010 for Microsoft Windows via Steam and the PlayStation 3 via the PlayStation Network. An Xbox Live Arcade version was announced, but it was cancelled.

Lead and Gold is set in the American Old West. It features four character classes and six game modes to choose from. Players work as a team to accomplish the objectives of a chosen game mode. The game received mixed reviews; it was often compared as an Old West version of Team Fortress 2.

== Gameplay ==
Lead and Gold features four unique character classes and six game modes.

Lead and Gold is set in the American Old West. It features four character classes to choose from, each having their own unique weapons, abilities, and "synergies". This "synergy" is a range-based booster that enhances the abilities of all nearby teammates. The Blaster wields a double barrel shotgun and dynamite sticks and radiates a defensive synergy effect. The Deputy wields a repeating carbine, has the ability to tag enemies for teammates, and radiate a damage increasing synergy effect. The Gunslinger carries a highly accurate revolver, has the ability to rapidly fire his revolver with reduced accuracy, and radiates a synergy effect that increases weapon accuracy. Trappers are equipped with a scoped hunting rifle, carry traps that can immobilize enemies, and radiate a critical hit synergy effect. Players can slowly regenerate health by remaining in proximity to other teammates. Additionally, any player can revive a fallen teammate.

Lead and Gold features six game modes to choose from. The first, Shootout, is a standard team deathmatch game mode. Conquest mode is similar to Unreal Tournament 2004's Onslaught mode. The objective of Conquest is to conquer waypoints in order. One team starts at their home zone and moves towards the enemy zone, while the other team advances in the other direction. Conquering a zone unlocks the next zone in the sequence. Clearing a zone of enemies and staying in the zone until your flag is raised will conquer that zone.

Powder Keg resembles another Unreal Tournament 2004 game mode, Assault. In Powder Keg, one team is trying to destroy objectives using powder kegs, while the other tries to defend these objectives. This mode is played in two rounds with each side taking a turn as attacker and defender. Gold Fever is a single player or two player cooperative game mode. The goal is to fend off endless waves of AI characters while you and your teammate attempt to obtain as many sacks of gold as possible. The game ends when both players die.

The fifth game mode, Robbery, is similar to Powder Keg, with one team the attackers and one the defenders. The attackers need to blow up a bank vault and steal three bags of gold. The defenders attempt to defend the bank and the gold. This mode is played in two rounds with each side alternating as attacker and defender. In the sixth game mode, Greed, players are to deliver as many gold sacks as possible to their team's drop zone. Once a gold sack spawns on the map, both teams fight to bring the sack to their respective areas. Once a team successfully brings the gold sack to their zone they gain a point and a new round begins.

== Development and marketing ==
Lead and Gold was revealed in August 2009, slated for release on the PC via Steam, the PlayStation Network and Xbox Live Arcade. The game is powered by the Diesel engine, which was used to power titles such as Bionic Commando Rearmed and Wanted: Weapons of Fate. The music for Lead and Gold was composed by Fathom, who created four tracks for the game. Fathom had previously worked with GRIN, the company from which FatShark was formed, on titles such as Bionic Commando and Terminator Salvation. The soundtrack was made available to the public on July 18, 2010 via iTunes.

Lead and Gold character classes were designed from American frontier archetypes.

The four character classes for Lead and Gold were patterned after American frontier archetypes. Staffon Ahlström, Visual Effects Artist for the game said "everyone has their archetypes in their mind of what [different kinds] of cowboys there [were]." "You have really distinct and iconic weapons in the Wild West" stated the game's writer Mangus Liljehdahl, adding "there's an apparent balance in the weapons that are available."

During the development, Gunnar Johnson and Mårten Stormdal of FatShark traveled to the United States to promote Lead and Gold. Johnson and Stormdal filmed the trip, in which they documented their visits to gaming media such as Game Informer and IGN and PC Gamer. Journalists played the game in groups of six via networked laptops and Xbox 360 controllers. FatShark has released multiple patches to decrease network lag, add dedicated server support, and provide other fixes and updates to the game. An additional patch containing one new map, Jacob's Bridge, and one new game type, Demolition, was released on May 20, 2010.

In December 2009, Gamereactor's Bengt Lemne mentioned stories of developers waiting long amounts of time for their titles to be published on Xbox Live Arcade, to which Lead and Gold producer Robert Bäckström responded "we really want to release it as soon as possible, [but] things might take time." On August 3, 2010 Mark Wester, CEO of the game's publisher Paradox Interactive cited issues with getting the game certified for release on Xbox Live Arcade. "It seems like we have to put it on the backburner," Wester said, further stating that the team was "not really putting any more effort into releasing on XBLA." The reason for the delay was not mentioned, merely that Paradox and Fatshark were waiting for response from Microsoft on Lead and Gold's status. This led some websites to list the game as cancelled or removed the Xbox Live Arcade listing entirely.

== Reception ==
Reception

Aggregate score
Aggregator	Score	
Aggregator	PC	PS3
Metacritic	70/100	68/100

Review scores
Publication	Score	
Publication	PC	PS3
The A.V. Club	B	N/A
Edge	6/10	N/A
Eurogamer	N/A	6/10
GamePro	N/A	3.5/5
GamesMaster	N/A	68%
GameSpot	7/10	7/10
GameZone	7.5/10	N/A
IGN	7/10	7/10
PC Format	85%	N/A
PC Gamer (UK)	83%	N/A
PC PowerPlay	3/10	N/A

Lead and Gold received "average" reviews according to the review aggregation website Metacritic. On July 25, 2010 Lead and Gold: Gangs of the Wild West reached the number one spot in sales on Steam.

The June 2010 issue of PC Gamer UK magazine was positive about the game, saying that it was "easily comparable with titles twice its price. Its core gunplay and design are more airtight than a collapsed mine." GameZone praised the simplicity of the PC version, stating that it was the game's greatest virtue. IGN enjoyed the team dynamics, particularly that players can revive other fallen comrades. IT Reviews commented that "Despite some aiming issues, this ambitious foray into online team shooting set in the golden age of outlaws has plenty of variety and well designed character classes and won't cost you a fistful of dollars." The Australian video game talk show Good Game's two reviewers gave the PC version 7/10 and 7.5/10. Kotaku stated the level designs were unique, providing plenty of choke points in maps and opportunities to flank opponents.

Edge was less enthusiastic about the PC version, saying that "there's wild west fun to be had within these simplistic charms, but it's unlikely to replace your favoured multiplayer shooter." Eurogamer, GameSpot and Kotaku complained of multiplayer lag in the game. Kotaku's Luke Plunkett said he "[couldn't] remember the last online shooter [he] played that was so crippled by it." Subsequent patches have repaired networking issues found in the original release.
