= Krater (video game) =

2012 role-playing video game

- Developer: Fatshark
- Publisher: Fatshark
- Platforms: Microsoft Windows, Mac OS X
- Release: June 12, 2012 (PC); February 25, 2013 (Mac)
- Genre: Role-playing
- Mode: Single-player

Krater is a role-playing video game for Microsoft Windows. It was released in 2012 via the Steam digital distribution platform. Fatshark developed the game following the studio's moderate success after developing Lead and Gold: Gangs of the Wild West and other titles.

On 29 May 2012 it was announced the Krater $10,000 Victor Edition, in which Victor Magnuson, the game designer, delivered the video game to the buyer personally, cook a meal and played the game.

== Gameplay ==
Krater is a squad-based real-time strategy role-playing game. The player controls a team of gas masked survivalists in a post-apocalyptic Sweden. Players venture in a post-apocalyptic world scoured by a nuclear war. Players can command up to three characters, but reserve members may be purchased.

The combat system of the game is fashioned similar to Blizzard's Diablo series. The player control's a team of three characters from a range of four different classes and their "mutated" variants. The classes are "Bruiser" which takes the role of a tank. A "Medikus" which takes the traditional role of a healer. A "Slayer" which is generally used for short range DPS, or damage dealers and a "Regulator" which is generally a longer ranged DPS. The mutated variants of these classes offer differing, yet similar skills. The player can also have a team of reserve characters. The player's team always attack together, but individual members can be reassigned to attack other targets. Each member can have up to two fixed skills and are only cool-down dependable. There is no traditional levelling system in the game and is only dependable on stat-enhancing character mods called "implants". The game also features permanent deaths of party members. Once a member dies, they must be replaced with a new recruit.

The crafting system in the game is dependable on acquiring blueprints and gathering materials for the construction of the item. Players find blueprints by either looting dungeons or purchasing from vendors.

== Reception ==
Reception

Aggregate score
Aggregator	Score
Metacritic	52/100

Review scores
Publication	Score
Destructoid	5.5/10
Electronic Gaming Monthly	3.5/10
Game Informer	6/10
GameSpot	5/10
GameSpy	2/5
IGN	5/10

Krater received mixed reviews from critics upon release. On Metacritic, the game holds a score of 52/100 based on 36 reviews, indicating "mixed or average reviews". Reviews praised the game for its unique storytelling and setting, easy learning curve, and its crafting and character development. However, reviewers also stated that the game needed improvement with balancing in combat, uninteresting quest design, and too few skills and customization.
