= List of real-time strategy video games =

This is an index of real-time strategy video games, sorted chronologically. Information regarding date of release, developer, platform, setting and notability is provided when available.

== Legend ==
Video game platforms
3DO	3DO	AMI	Amiga	APPII	Apple II
Arcade	Arcade video game	A2001	Arcadia 2001	ATRST	Atari ST, Atari Falcon
ATR	Atari 8-bit computers	BSD	Berkeley Software Distribution, OpenBSD or FreeBSD	C64	Commodore 64
CPC	Amstrad CPC	DC	Dreamcast	DOS	PC DOS / MS-DOS, Windows 3.X
DROID	Android	DS	Nintendo DS, DSiWare, iQue DS	FMT	FM Towns
GBA	Game Boy Advance, iQue GBA	GCN	GameCube	GEN	Genesis / Mega Drive
INT	Intellivision	iOS	iOS, iPhone, iPod, iPadOS, iPad, visionOS, Apple Vision Pro	LIN	Linux, SteamOS
Luna	Amazon Luna	MAC	Classic Mac OS, 2001 and before	MSX	MSX
N64	Nintendo 64, iQue Player	NES	Nintendo Entertainment System / Famicom	NS	Nintendo Switch
OSX	macOS	PC88	PC-8800 series	PC98	PC-9800 series
PCE	TurboGrafx-16 / PC Engine	PPC	Pocket PC	PS1	PlayStation 1
PS2	PlayStation 2	PS3	PlayStation 3	PS4	PlayStation 4
PS5	PlayStation 5	PSP	PlayStation Portable	Quest	Meta Quest / Oculus Quest family, including Oculus Rift
SAT	Sega Saturn	SMS	Master System	SNES	Super NES / Super Famicom / Super Comboy
TRS80	TRS-80	UNIX	Unix	WEB	Browser game
Wii	Wii, WiiWare, Wii Virtual Console	WiiU	Wii U, WiiU Virtual Console	WIN	Windows, all versions Windows 95 and up
WSC	WonderSwan Color	X1	Sharp X1	XB360	Xbox 360, Xbox 360 Live Arcade
XB	Xbox, Xbox Live Arcade	XBO	Xbox One	XBX/S	Xbox Series X/S
ZX	ZX Spectrum				

== By year ==
Year	Released
1982	5
1983	4
1984	1
1985	3
1986	1
1987	3
1988	6
1989	5
1990	3
1991	9
1992	4
1993	4
1994	7
1995	5
1996	13
1997	37
1998	46
1999	27
2000	36
2001	44
2002	27
2003	26
2004	37
2005	23
2006	29
2007	28
2008	17
2009	22
2010	17
2011	12
2012	13
2013	15
2014	11
2015	14
2016	21
2017	18
2018	13
2019	16
2020	11
2021	14
2022	11
2023	14
2024	36
2025	33
2026	?

== List of games ==
Year	Game	Developer	Setting	Platform	Notes
1982	Utopia	Don Daglow	Simulation	INT	Real-time strategy.
1982	Cosmic Conquest	Alan Sartori-Angus	Sci-fi	APPII	Real-time space strategy.
1982	Cytron Masters	Ozark Softscape	Sci-fi	ATR	Real-time strategy.
1982	Legionnaire	Chris Crawford	Historical	ATR	Real-time strategy.
1982	Ocean Battle	Emerson Radio	Naval	A2001	Real-time strategy.
1983	Bokosuka Wars	Kōji Sumii	Fantasy	X1	Strategy role-playing game Reverse tower defense Real-time strategy.
1983	Combat Leader	SSI	Military	ATR, C64	Real-time strategy.
1983	NATO Commander	MicroProse	Political	ATR, APPII, C64	Real-time strategy.
1983	Stonkers	Imagine Software	Military	ZX	Real-time strategy.
1984	The Ancient Art of War	Evryware	Historical	APPII, DOS, MAC, TRS80	Real-time tactics.
1985	Darkhorn: Realm of the Warlords	Avalon Hill	Fantasy	APPII, C64	Real-time strategy.
1985	Psi-5 Trading Company	Distinctive Software	Sci-fi	CPC, C64, ZX, APPII, DOS	Real-time strategy.
1985	Quake Minus One	Beyond Software	Sci-fi	C64	Real-time strategy.
1986	Legend	Coreland, Kyugo Trading Co., Ltd	Historical	Arcade	Side-scrolling action-strategy, Real-time game.
1987	The Ancient Art of War at Sea	Evryware	Historical	DOS	Real-time tactics.
1987	Invasion	Bulldog Software	Sci-fi	C64	Real-time strategy.
1987	Nether Earth	Argus Press Software	Sci-fi	ZX	Real-time strategy.
1988	Carrier Command	Realtime	Sci-fi	AMI, C64, CPC, ATRST, ZX	Vehicle simulation game, Real-time strategy.
1988	Energy Warrior	Binary Design	Sci-fi	C64	Scrolling shooter.
1988	Gain Ground	Sega	Historical	Arcade, SMS, GEN, PCE	Action-strategy, Real-time game.
1988	Herzog	TechnoSoft	Sci-fi	MSX, PC88	Strategy video game, Real-time game.
1988	J.R.R. Tolkien's War in Middle-earth	Melbourne House	Fantasy		Real-time tactics.
1988	Modem Wars	Ozark Softscape	Sci-fi	C64, DOS	Real-time strategy.
1989	Herzog Zwei	TechnoSoft	Sci-fi	GEN	Real-time strategy, Tactical shooter.
1989	North & South	Infogrames	Historical		
1989	Populous	Bullfrog	Fantasy		God game.
1989	Rings of Medusa	Starbyte Software	Fantasy	AMI, ATRST, C64, DOS	Real-time strategy, RPG.
1989	Wicked	Electric Dreams Software	Fantasy	AMI, ATRST, C64	Real-time strategy.
1990	Command HQ	Ozark Softscape	Historical	MAC, DOS	Grand strategy.
1990	Powermonger	Bullfrog	Fantasy		
1990	Supremacy: Your Will Be Done	Probe	Sci-fi	AMI, C64, DOS, ATRST, NES	Aka. Overlord (US).
1991	Battle Storm	Bullet-Proof Software, Inc.	Modern	NES	Action RTS with action movie stars & money system.
1991	J.R.R. Tolkien's Riders of Rohan	Beam, Papyrus	Fantasy	DOS	
1991	Just Another War in Space	Azeroth, Inc.	Sci-fi	ATRST	
1991	Lord Monarch	Nihon Falcom	Fantasy	PC98, FMT, SNES, GEN, Wii, WIN, PS1	Part of Dragon Slayer series.
1991	Mega Lo Mania	Sensible	Fantasy		First title using Tech Tree. US GEN title: Tyrants: Fight Through Time.
1991	Populous II: Trials of the Olympian Gods	Bullfrog	Fantasy		God game. Sequel to Populous.
1991	Realms	Graftgold	Fantasy	AMI, ATRST, DOS	Real-time kingdom sim, recruitment & combat.
1991	Shadow Sorcerer	U.S. Gold	Fantasy	AMI, DOS, ATRST	More strategy than RPG.
1991	Utopia: The Creation of a Nation	Celestial	Sci-fi		
1992	Dune II	Westwood	Sci-fi		Established the RTS format that would be followed for years to come (first real RTS game).
1992	Hanjuku Eiyuu - Aa Sekai Yo Hanjuku Nare	Square	Comedic fantasy	SNES, WSC	
1992	Siege	Mindcraft	Fantasy	DOS	
1992	Utopia: The New Worlds	Celestial	Sci-fi	DOS, AMI, ATRST	Add-on to Utopia: TCoaN.
1993	Cannon Fodder	Sensible	Modern War		RTS, separable troops move via way points.
1993	Metal Marines	Namco	Sci-fi	DOS, SNES	
1993	The Settlers	Blue Byte	Fantasy	AMI, DOS	City builder & RTS.
1993	Stronghold: Kingdom Simulator	Stormfront	Fantasy	DOS, FMT, PC98, WIN, LIN, OSX	
1994	Alien Legacy	Ybarra	Sci-fi	DOS	
1994	Iron Seed	Channel 7	Sci-fi	DOS	
1994	K240	Celestial	Sci-fi	AMI	Sequel to Utopia: TCoaN.
1994	Reunion	Amnesty Design	Sci-fi	AMI, DOS	Resources & colony management, but with no real-time combat.
1994	The Horde	Toys for Bob	Fantasy	3DO, DOS, SAT, FMT, PC98	Action strategy; town-builder modes.
1994	Warcraft: Orcs & Humans	Blizzard	Fantasy	DOS, MAC	Second real RTS game.
1994	Warpath	Synthetic Reality	Sci-fi	DOS	
1995	Baldies	Creative Edge Software	Sci-fi fantasy	DOS, MAC, PS1, SAT, WIN	
1995	Command & Conquer	Westwood	Sci-fi		
1995	Conqueror A.D. 1086	Software Sorcery	Historical, fantasy	DOS	Real-time modes: Kingdom sim, lite-SRPG & first-person tactics.
1995	Paranoia!	Phoenix Arts	Sci-fi	DOS	Czech & Slovak languages only. Inspired by Dune II.
1995	Warcraft II: Tides of Darkness	Blizzard	Fantasy	DOS, MAC, PS1	Sequel to Warcraft: Orcs & Humans.
1996	Blood & Magic	Tachyon	Fantasy	DOS, WIN	
1996	Command & Conquer: Red Alert	Westwood	Alternate History, Sci-fi	DOS, WIN, PS1	
1996	Dragon Force	Sega	Fantasy	SAT	Separate strategy and tactics layers.
1996	Fragile Allegiance	Gremlin	Sci-fi	DOS, WIN	4X game. Remake of K240.
1996	Genewars	Bullfrog	Sci-fi	DOS, WIN	
1996	Paranoia II	Phoenix Arts	Sci-fi	DOS	Czech sequel to Czech title, Paranoia!.
1996	Polanie	MDF	Historical	DOS, WIN	Like Warcraft.
1996	The Settlers II	Blue Byte	Fantasy	DOS, MAC, DS	City builder & RTS. Sequel to The Settlers.
1996	War Diary	Trigger Soft, HQ Team	Historical	DOS, WIN	
1996	War Wind	DreamForge	Fantasy	WIN	
1996	Z	The Bitmap Brothers	Sci-fi		
1997	7th Legion	Epic MegaGames	Sci-fi	WIN	
1997	Age of Empires	Ensemble	Historical	MAC, PPC, WIN	
1997	Armored Moon: The Next Eden	Sung Jin Multimedia	Sci-fi	WIN	
1997	Beasts and Bumpkins	Worldweaver	Fantasy	WIN	
1997	Chaos Island: The Lost World	DreamWorks Interactive	Sci-fi, Prehistoric	WIN	
1997	Command & Conquer: Sole Survivor	Westwood	Sci-fi	WIN	Spin-off of Command & Conquer.
1997	Conquest Earth	Data Design Interactive	Sci-fi	DOS, WIN	
1997	Counter Blow	CenoZoic - SKC	Sci-fi	WIN	(카운터블로우)
1997	Dark Colony	GameTek Canada, Take-Two Canada	Sci-fi	WIN	Like Command & Conquer.
1997	Dark Reign: The Future of War	Auran	Sci-fi	WIN	
1997	Dungeon Keeper	Bullfrog Productions	Fantasy	WIN	Dungeon management game.
1997	Earth 2140	Reality Pump Studios	Sci-fi		
1997	Enemy Nations	Windward	Sci-fi	WIN	
1997	Final Conflict	R.I. Soft Systems, Sound Source Interactive	Sci-fi	WIN	Real-time strategy.
1997	Imperium Galactica	Digital Reality	Sci-fi	DOS	4X game.
1997	Jurassic War	Tranquil Revolt	Fantasy, Prehistoric	DOS	
1997	KKnD	Beam	Post-apocalyptic	DOS	
1997	L.E.D. Wars, The	Larian	Sci-fi	WIN	
1997	Myth: The Fallen Lords	Bungie	Fantasy	MAC, WIN	Real-time tactics.
1997	Napoleon	Collision	Historical	WIN	
1997	NetStorm: Islands At War	Titanic	Sci-fi	WIN	
1997	Outpost 2: Divided Destiny	Dynamix	Sci-fi	WIN	Sequel to Outpost.
1997	Pax Imperia Eminent Domain	Heliotrope	Sci-fi	MAC, WIN	
1997	Rising Lands	Microïds	Fantasy	WIN	
1997	Seven Kingdoms	Enlight	Historical	WIN	
1997	Seven Years War	HQ Team	Historical	WIN	
1997	Star Command: Revolution	Metropolis	Sci-fi	DOS, WIN	Shoot 'em up mix.
1997	Stone Axe: Search for Elysium	LG Soft	Fantasy, Prehistoric	WIN	No EN language release.
1997	Svea Rike	Korkeken, Target Games	Historical	WIN	
1997	Tone Rebellion, The	The Logic Factory	Sci-fi	WIN	
1997	Total Annihilation	Cavedog	Sci-fi	MAC, WIN	
1997	Uprising: Join or Die	Cyclone Studios	Sci-fi	WIN	Hybrid FPS/RTS.
1997	Vlad Tepes Dracula	ComputerHouse GBG AB	Fantasy	WIN	
1997	War Inc.	Optik Software	Sci-fi	DOS	
1997	War Wind II: Human Onslaught	DreamForge	Fantasy	WIN	Sequel to War Wind.
1998	Alien Encounter	Cenozoic Entertainment	Sci-fi	WIN	
1998	Anno 1602	Max Design	Historical	WIN	Society Strategy.
1998	Armor Command	Ronin Entertainment	Sci-fi	WIN	
1998	ARSENAL: Taste the Power	Tactical Soft	Alternate history	DOS	Like Dune II and Command & Conquer.
1998	Battles of the Outer Rim	Macmillan	Sci-fi	WIN	Unofficial add-on to Dark Reign: The Future of War.
1998	Battlezone	Activision	Sci-fi	WIN	FPS/RTS mix.
1998	Command & Conquer: Red Alert - Retaliation	Westwood	Alternate History, Sci-fi	PS1, PS3, PSP	Port of Command & Conquer: RA and expansions.
1998	Cyberstorm 2: Corporate Wars	Dynamix	Sci-fi	WIN	Turn-based strategy with an inferior real-time option.
1998	Dominant Species	Red Storm Entertainment	Sci-fi	WIN	
1998	Dominion: Storm Over Gift 3	Ion Storm, 7th Level	Sci-fi	WIN	Sequel to mech FPS, G-Nome.
1998	Dune 2000	Intelligent, Westwood	Sci-fi	PS1, WIN	Partial remake of Dune II.
1998	Echelon	Amnesty Visual	Sci-fi	WIN	Like Command & Conquer.
1998	Extreme Tactics	Media Station, Piranha	Sci-fi	WIN	
1998	Foundation	Sadeness Software	Historical	AMI	1st version of title. Influenced by early The Settlers titles.
1998	Hesperian Wars	Pterodon	Fantasy	WIN	
1998	Husita	Phoenix Arts	Historical	DOS	Czech-language RTS styled after Warcraft II, but with Seven Kingdoms-type economy.
1998	Jeff Wayne's The War of the Worlds	Rage	Sci-fi	PS1, WIN	
1998	KKND2: Krossfire	Beam	Sci-fi	PS1, WIN	Sequel to KKnD.
1998	Knights and Merchants: The Shattered Kingdom	Joymania	Fantasy		
1998	Magic and Mayhem	Mythos	Fantasy	WIN	
1998	Metal Knight	Object Software Limited	Sci-fi	WIN	
1998	Mona²: Monarch Monarch	Nihon Falcom	Fantasy	WIN	JP spinoff to Lord Monarch.
1998	Myth II: Soulblighter	Bungie	Fantasy	MAC, WIN	Real-time tactics. Sequel to Myth: The Fallen Lords.
1998	Populous: The Beginning	Bullfrog	Fantasy	WIN, PS1	God game.
1998	Rage of Mages	Nival	Fantasy	WIN	RPG & real-time tactics.
1998	Rival Realms	Activ Pub	Fantasy	WIN	
1998	Riverworld	Cryo Interactive	Sci-fi	WIN	
1998	Robo Rumble	Metropolis Software	Futuristic	WIN, OSX	Uses money for building & buying units & parts. Aka. RoBoRumble or Reflux.
1998	Saga: Rage of the Vikings	Cryo Interactive	Fantasy	WIN	
1998	Skull Caps	Creative Edge Software	Fantasy	WIN	Sequel to Baldies.
1998	StarCraft	Blizzard	Sci-fi	MAC, WIN	
1998	Star Wars: Rebellion	Coolhand Interactive	Sci-fi	WIN	4X game.
1998	Stratosphere: Conquest of the Skies	Kodiak Interactive Software Studios	Sci-fi	WIN	
1998	The Settlers III	Blue Byte	Fantasy	WIN	City builder & RTS. Sequel to The Settlers II.
1998	Three Kingdoms: Divine Destiny	Dong Seo Interactive	Historical	WIN	
1998	Tides of War	Devil's Thumb Entertainment	Alternate history	WIN	
1998	Tribal Rage	disintegrator	Post-apocalypse	WIN	Like Mad Max film series.
1998	Uprising X	Cyclone Studios (3DO)	Sci-fi	PS1	FPS/RTS mix. PS1 port of Uprising: Join or Die.
1998	Uprising 2: Lead and Destroy	Cyclone Studios (3DO)	Sci-fi	WIN	FPS/RTS mix. Sequel to Uprising: Join or Die.
1998	Urban Assault	TerraTools	Sci-fi, post-apocalypse	WIN	Hybrid FPS/RTS.
1998	WarBreeds	Red Orb	Sci-fi/Fantasy	WIN	Has genetic engineering.
1999	Age of Empires II: The Age of Kings	Ensemble	Historical	DS, MAC, PS2, WIN	Sequel to Age of Empires.
1999	Alien Nations	Neo Software	Sci-fi	MAC, WIN	
1999	Ancient Conquest: Quest for the Golden Fleece	Megamedia Australia	Mythological	WIN	
1999	Aztec Wars	New Media Generation	Alternate history	WIN	
1999	Battlezone II: Combat Commander	Pandemic	Sci-fi	WIN	FPS/RTS mix. Sequel to Battlezone.
1999	Battle Commander: Return of Waroid	Geomind Entertainment	Sci-fi	WIN	
1999	Beatdown	Soar Software	Urban	WIN	
1999	Black Moon Chronicles	Cryo Interactive	Fantasy	WIN	Real-time tactics, TB campaign map.
1999	Command & Conquer: Tiberian Sun	Westwood	Sci-fi	WIN	Sequel to Command & Conquer.
1999	Corsairs: Conquest at Sea	Microïds	Historical	WIN	RTS, action adventure.
1999	Dungeon Keeper 2	Bullfrog Productions	Fantasy	WIN	Dungeon management game. Sequel to Dungeon Keeper.
1999	Final Demand: The Challenge	United Software Entertainment AG	Sci-fi	WIN	
1999	Final Odyssey	Joymax	Sci-fi	WIN	Like StarCraft.
1999	Homeworld	Relic	Sci-fi	LIN, OSX, WIN	First RTS "3D in 3D": RTS in space.
1999	Horde: Northern Wind	7th BitLabs	Fantasy	DOS, WIN	
1999	Lego Rock Raiders	Data Design Interactive	Sci-fi	WIN	Like Dungeon Keeper
1999	Machines	Charybdis	Sci-fi	WIN	German disc title: Machines: Wired for War. Has direct unit control action.
1999	Malvinas 2032	Sabarasa	Sci-fi	WIN	
1999	Mission: Humanity	Techland Soft	Sci-fi	WIN	Like Command & Conquer.
1999	Napalm: The Crimson Crisis	Ablaze Entertainment	Sci-fi	Amiga	Game focused on AI revolt. Original title for Amiga. Enabled creation of State of War.
1999	Seven Kingdoms II: The Fryhtan Wars	Enlight	Fantasy	WIN	Sequel to Seven Kingdoms.
1999	Space Clash: The Last Frontier	Enigma Software	Sci-fi	WIN	
1999	Svea Rike II	Korkeken, Target Games	Historical	WIN	Sequel to Svea Rike.
1999	Swarm Assault	Gate 5 Software	Nature	WIN	
1999	Tanktics	DMA Design	Sci-fi	WIN	
1999	Total Annihilation: Kingdoms	Cavedog	Fantasy	WIN	Sequel to Total Annihilation.
1999	Warzone 2100	Pumpkin	Sci-fi, Post-apocalypse	PS1, WIN, LIN, OSX	Re-released as free software under the GPL.
2000	Allegiance	Microsoft	Sci-fi	WIN	
2000	America	Related Designs	Historical	WIN	
2000	Battlezone: Rise of the Black Dogs	Activision	Sci-fi	N64	
2000	Command & Conquer: Red Alert 2	Westwood	Alternate History, Sci-fi	WIN	Sequel to Command & Conquer: RA.
2000	Cossacks: European Wars	GSC	Historical	WIN	
2000	Cultures: Discovery of Vinland	Funatics	Historical	WIN	City builder & RTS.
2000	Dark Reign 2	Pandemic	Sci-fi	WIN	Sequel to Dark Reign: The Future of War.
2000	Dogs of War: Battle On Primus IV	Silicon Dreams Studio	Sci-fi	WIN	
2000	Earth 2150	Reality Pump Studios	Sci-fi	WIN	Sequel to Earth 2140.
2000	Empire of the Ants (2000)	Microïds	Nature	WIN	1st game based on 1991 namesake novel.
2000	Exodus: The Last War	Sland	Sci-fi	AMI	Comparable to Command & Conquer titles.
2000	Foundation: Gold	Epic	Historical	AMI	Final version of 1998's Foundation. Influenced by early The Settlers titles.
2000	Ground Control	Massive Entertainment	Sci-fi	WIN	Real-time tactics.
2000	Imperium Galactica II: Alliances	Digital Reality	Sci-fi	WIN	4X game. Sequel to Imperium Galactica.
2000	Majesty: The Fantasy Kingdom Sim	Cyberlore	Fantasy		
2000	Mayday: Conflict Earth	Boris	Sci-fi	WIN	
2000	Metal Fatigue	Zono	Sci-fi	WIN	
2000	Invictus: In the Shadow of Olympus	Quicksilver Software	Mythological	WIN	RTS/RPG mix
2000	Sacrifice	Shiny	Fantasy	MAC, OSX, WIN	
2000	Starship Troopers: Terran Ascendancy	Blue Tongue Entertainment	Sci-fi	WIN	Real-time tactics.
2000	Star Trek: Armada	Activision	Sci-fi	WIN	
2000	Star Trek: New Worlds	Binary Asylum, 14 Degrees East	Sci-fi	WIN	
2000	Star Wars: Force Commander	Ronin, LucasArts	Sci-fi	WIN	
2000	Sudden Strike	Fireglow	Historical	WIN	Real-time tactics.
2000	Submarine Titans	Ellipse	Sci-fi, post-apocalypse	WIN	
2000	Thandor: The Invasion	Innonics	Sci-fi	WIN	
2000	Theocracy	Philos	Historical	WIN, LIN	One of the earliest commercial Linux RTS games.
2000	The Outforce	O3 Games	Sci-fi	WIN	
2000	Three Kingdoms II: Clash of Destiny	Dong Seo Interactive	Historical	WIN	Sequel to Three Kingdoms: Divine Destiny
2000	Three Kingdoms: Fate of the Dragon	Overmax Studios, Object Software Limited	Historical	WIN	
2000	Tzar: Burden of the Crown	Haemimont	Historical	WIN	
2000	Warlords Battlecry	SSG	Fantasy	WIN	
2001	Atrox	Joymax	Sc-Fi	WIN	StarCraft clone.
2001	Battle Realms	Liquid Entertainment	Fantasy	WIN	
2001	Black & White	Lionhead Studios	Fantasy	WIN	God Game.
2001	Colobot	EPSITEC	Sci-fi	WIN	
2001	Conflict Zone	MASA Group	Modern War	DC, WIN, PS2	
2001	Conquest: Frontier Wars	Fever Pitch	Sci-fi	WIN	
2001	Dragon Throne: Battle of Red Cliffs	Object Software Limited	Historical	WIN	
2001	Emperor: Battle for Dune	Intelligent, Westwood	Sci-fi	WIN	Sequel to Dune 2000.
2001	Empire Earth	Stainless Steel	Historical, Alternate History, Sci-fi	WIN	
2001	Far Gate	Super X Studios	Sci-fi	WIN	
2001	Giants: Citizen Kabuto	Planet Moon	Fantasy	WIN	Third-person shooter/real-time strategy hybrid.
2001	Gundam Battle Online (FR wiki)	BEC	Military science fiction	DC	Semi-real time "Map Mode" strategy & real-time "Battle Mode" tactics.
2001	Horde: The Citadel	7th BitLabs	Fantasy	WIN	Sequel to Horde: Northern Wind.
2001	Hostile Waters: Antaeus Rising	Rage	Sci-fi	WIN	
2001	Hundred Swords	Smilebit	Fantasy	DC	
2001	Kingdom Under Fire: A War of Heroes	Phantagram	Fantasy	WIN	
2001	Kohan: Immortal Sovereigns	TimeGate	Fantasy	LIN, WIN	
2001	Magic & Mayhem: The Art of Magic	Charybdis, Climax	Fantasy	WIN	Prequel to Magic and Mayhem. RPG hybrid.
2001	Mech Platoon	Kotobuki	Sci-fi	GBA	
2001	Myth III: The Wolf Age	MumboJumbo	Fantasy	MAC, WIN	Real-time tactics. Prequel to Myth and Myth II.
2001	Mythical Warriors: Battle for Eastland	Outerbound Games	Fantasy	WIN	
2001	Original War	Altar Games	Sci-fi	WIN	
2001	Outlive	Continuum	Sci-fi	WIN	
2001	Pikmin	Nintendo	Sci-fi	GCN, Wii, WiiU, NS	
2001	Persian Wars	Cryo Interactive	Fantasy	WIN	
2001	Primitive Wars	Wizard Soft Ltd.	Fantasy, Prehistoric	WIN	
2001	Real War	Rival Interactive, Semi Logic Entertainments	Modern War	WIN	Made from 2000 original version for US military.
2001	Scorched 3D	Gavin Camp	History	WIN, LIN, OSX, UNIX	TB artillery sim; minor RTS. Sequel to Scorched Earth.
2001	Shattered Galaxy	KRU Interactive\Nexon Inc.	Sci-fi	WIN	Massively multiplayer real-time strategy.
2001	Star Trek: Armada II	Mad Doc Software	Sci-fi	WIN	Sequel to Star Trek: Armada.
2001	Star Wars: Galactic Battlegrounds	LucasArts	Sci-fi	MAC, WIN	
2001	State of War	Cypron Studios	Sci-fi	WIN	
2001	Stronghold	Firefly	Historical	OSX, WIN	RTS & city builder.
2001	S.W.I.N.E.	StormRegion	Fantasy	WIN	Real-time tactics.
2001	The Nations	Neo Software	Fantasy	WIN	Sequel to Alien Nations.
2001	The Settlers IV	Blue Byte	Fantasy	WIN, iOS, DROID	City builder & RTS. Sequel to The Settlers III. Also on few old mobiles.
2001	Vital Device: Entrapped by the Queen	Cenozoic Entertainment	Sci-fi	WIN	
2001	World War III: Black Gold	Reality Pump	Modern War	WIN	
2001	Z: Steel Soldiers	The Bitmap Brothers	Sci-fi	WIN	Sequel to Z (video game).
2002	Age of Mythology	Ensemble	Mythology	OSX, WIN	
2002	American Conquest	GSC	Historical	WIN	
2002	Anno 1503	Max Design	Historical	WIN	Society Strategy. Sequel to Anno 1602.
2002	Army Men: RTS	Pandemic	Sci-fi	PS2, WIN, GCN	
2002	ARSENAL Extended Power	Tactical Soft	Alternate history	WIN	Enhanced patch of A.R.S.E.N.A.L Taste the Power.
2002	Celtic Kings: Rage of War	Haemimont	Historical	WIN	
2002	Cultures 2: The Gates of Asgard	Funatics	Fantasy	WIN	City builder & RTS. Sequel to Cultures: Discovery of Vinland.
2002	Dark Planet: Battle for Natrolis	Edgies	Sci-fi	WIN	
2002	Golem	Longsoft	Post-apocalyptic	WIN	
2002	The Gladiators: Galactic Circus Games	Eugen Systems	Sci-fi	WIN	Real-time tactics.
2002	Haegemonia: Legions of Iron	Digital Reality	Sci-fi	WIN	
2002	Micro Commandos	Monte Cristo	Sci-fi	WIN	
2002	Project Earth: Starmageddon	Lemon Interactive	Sci-fi	WIN	
2002	Sangokushi Battlefield	Koei	Historical	WIN	
2002	Soldiers of Anarchy	Silver Style Entertainment	Post-apocalyptic	WIN	Real-time tactics.
2002	Stronghold: Crusader	Firefly	Historical	WIN	
2002	Sudden Strike 2	Fireglow	Historical	WIN	Real-time tactics. Sequel to Sudden Strike.
2002	Swarm Rampage	Gate 5 Software	Nature	WIN	Sequel to Swarm Assault.
2002	Treasure Planet: Battle at Procyon	Barking Dog Studios	Sci-Fi	WIN	Set five years after events of Disney film Treasure Planet.
2002	Warcraft III: Reign of Chaos	Blizzard	Fantasy	MAC, OSX, WIN	First full 3D in Warcraft series.
2002	War and Peace: 1796–1815	Microids	Historical	WIN	
2002	Warlords Battlecry II	SSG	Fantasy	WIN	Sequel to Warlords Battlecry.
2002	Warrior Kings	Black Cactus, Zonic	Fantasy	WIN, MAC	
2003	Aliens Versus Predator: Extinction	Zono	Sci-Fi	PS2, XB	
2003	Battle Mages	Targem Games	Fantasy	WIN	
2003	Blitzkrieg	Nival	Historical	WIN	Real-time tactics.
2003	Command & Conquer: Generals	EA	Modern War	WIN, MAC	
2003	Empires: Dawn of the Modern World	Stainless Steel	Historical	WIN	
2003	Highland Warriors	Soft	Historical	WIN	
2003	Homeworld 2	Relic	Sci-fi	OSX, WIN	Sequel to Homeworld.
2003	Impossible Creatures	Relic	Sci-fi	WIN	
2003	Jang Bogo, The Lord of the Sea	HQ Team	Fantasy	WIN	Warcraft III clone.
2003	Lords of Everquest	Rapid Eye	Fantasy	WIN	
2003	Magic Chronicle	CyberPlanet Interactive	Fantasy	WIN	Thai-only release with EN language.
2003	Nemesis of the Roman Empire	Haemimont	Historical	WIN	Sequel to Celtic Kings: Rage of War.
2003	No Man's Land	Related Designs	Historical	WIN	
2003	Once Upon a Knight	Reality Pump Studios	Fantasy	WIN, OSX, LIN	Sequel to Polanie. Aka. KnightShift (Europe).
2003	Praetorians	Pyro Studios	Historical	WIN	Real-time tactics.
2003	Rise of Nations	Big Huge	Historical	OSX, WIN	
2003	Savage: The Battle for Newerth	S2	Fantasy	LIN, OSX, WIN	
2003	Space Colony	Firefly	Sci-fi	OSX, WIN	
2003	The Entente: Battlefields WW1	Lesta Studio	Historical	WIN	
2003	The History Channel: Crusades – Quest for Power	Zono	Historical	WIN	
2003	The Legend: Kings Legacy II	Fenix Team	Fantasy	WIN	
2003	The Lord of the Rings: War of the Ring	Liquid	Fantasy	WIN	
2003	Warrior Kings: Battles	Black Cactus	Fantasy	WIN, MAC	Sequel to Warrior Kings.
2004	Against Rome	Independent Arts Software GmbH	Historical	WIN	
2004	Alexander	GSC	Historical	WIN	
2004	Arena Wars	exDream	Sci-fi	WIN	
2004	Armies of Exigo	Black Hole	Fantasy	WIN	
2004	Axis & Allies	TimeGate	Historical	WIN	Based loosely on the Axis & Allies strategy board game series. Mixes grand TBS & local RTS.
2004	Battle for Troy	Zono	Mythological	WIN	
2004	Besieger	Primal Software	Fantasy	WIN	
2004	Castle Strike	Related Designs	Historical	WIN	
2004	D-Day	Digital Reality	Historical	WIN	Real-time tactics.
2004	Desert Rats vs Afrika Korps	Digital Reality	Historical	WIN	Real-time tactics.
2004	Evil Genius	Elixir	Sci-fi	WIN	
2004	Gangland	MediaMobsters	Contemporary	WIN	
2004	Glest	Glest Team	Fantasy	LIN, WIN	
2004	Ground Control II: Operation Exodus	Massive Entertainment	Sci-fi	WIN	Real-time tactics. Sequel to Ground Control.
2004	I of the Dragon	Primal	Fantasy	WIN	
2004	Imperivm: Great Battles of Rome	Haemimont	Historical	WIN	Sequel to Nemesis of the Roman Empire.
2004	Knights of Honor	Black Sea	Historical	WIN	Real-time grand strategy.
2004	Kohan II: Kings of War	TimeGate	Fantasy	WIN	Sequel to Kogan: IS.
2004	Medieval Conquest	Cat Daddy Games	Fantasy	WIN	
2004	Nexus: The Jupiter Incident	Mithis Entertainment	Sci-fi	WIN	Real-time tactics.
2004	Perimeter	K-D Lab	Sci-fi	WIN	
2004	Pikmin 2	Nintendo	Sci-fi	GCN, Wii, WiiU, NS	Sequel to Pikmin.
2004	Portugal 1111: A Conquista de Soure	Ciberbit	Historical	WIN	
2004	Soldiers: Heroes of World War II	Best Way	Historical	WIN	Real-time tactics.
2004	SpellForce: The Order of Dawn	Phenomic	Fantasy	WIN	First HBRTS.
2004	Spring project	Swedish Yankspankers	Sci-fi	LIN, WIN	A game engine, not a game.
2004	Strategy 3: The Dark Legions	Mascot Entertainment	Fantasy	WIN	
2004	The History Channel: Alamo – Fight for Independence	Zono	Historical	WIN	
2004	The Lord of the Rings: The Battle for Middle-earth	EA	Fantasy	WIN	
2004	Warhammer 40,000: Dawn of War	Relic	Sci-fi, Fantasy	WIN	
2004	Warlords Battlecry III	Infinite	Fantasy	WIN	Sequel to Warlords Battlecry II.
2004	Wars and Warriors: Joan of Arc	Enlight	Historical	WIN	
2004	War Times	Legend Studios	Historical	WIN	
2005	Act of War: Direct Action	Eugen	Contemporary, Sci-fi	WIN	Real-time tactics.
2005	Age of Empires III	Ensemble	Historical	OSX, WIN	Sequel to Age of Empires II.
2005	Black & White 2	Lionhead Studios	Fantasy	WIN	God Game. Sequel to Black & White.
2005	Blitzkrieg 2	Nival	Historical	WIN	Real-time tactics. Sequel to Blitzkrieg.
2005	Cossacks II: Napoleonic Wars	GSC	Historical	WIN	Sequel to Cossacks: EW.
2005	Darwinia	Introversion	Sci-fi		
2005	Desert Law	Arise	Sci-fi	WIN	Real-time tactics.
2005	Dungeons & Dragons: Dragonshard	Liquid	Fantasy	WIN	
2005	Earth 2160	Reality Pump	Sci-fi	WIN	Sequel to Earth 2150.
2005	Empire Earth II	Mad Doc Software	Historical, Alternate History, Sci-fi	WIN	Sequel to Empire Earth.
2005	Genius: Biology	Radon Labs	Contemporary	WIN	Educational RTS about renaturation & biology.
2005	Great Invasions	Philippe Thibaut and Luca Cammisa	Historical	WIN	
2005	Legion Arena	Slitherine Strategies	Historical	WIN, OSX	Real-time tactics sequel to Legion.
2005	Quraish	Afkar media Ltd.	Historical	WIN	
2005	Rising Kingdoms	Haemimont	Fantasy	WIN	
2005	Stronghold 2	Firefly	Historical	WIN	Sequel to Stronghold.
2005	Supreme Ruler 2010	BattleGoat	Sci-fi	WIN	
2005	The Settlers: Heritage of Kings	Blue Byte	Fantasy	WIN	City builder & RTS. Sequel to The Settlers IV.
2005	Trash	Inhuman Games	Sci-fi	WIN	
2005	Tribal Trouble	Oddlabs	Historical, Fantasy	WIN, LIN, OSX	
2006	Ancient Wars: Sparta	World Forge	Historical	WIN	
2006	Anno 1701	Related Designs	Historical	WIN	Society Strategy. Sequel to Anno 1503.
2006	Company of Heroes	Relic	Historical	WIN	
2006	DEFCON: Everybody Dies	Introversion	Sci-fi		
2006	Faces of War	Best Way	Historical	WIN	Real-time tactics.
2006	Heroes of Annihilated Empires	GSC	Fantasy	WIN	
2006	Left Behind: Eternal Forces	Left Behind Games	Sci-fi	WIN	
2006	Lord of the Rings: The Battle for Middle-earth II, The	EA	Fantasy	WIN, XB360	Sequel to The Lord of the Rings: The Battle for Middle-earth.
2006	LostMagic	Taito, Garakuta	Fantasy	DS	
2006	Magnant	Mohydine	Sci-fi	WIN	
2006	ParaWorld	SEK	Sci-fi, Prehistoric	WIN	
2006	Rise and Fall: Civilizations at War	Stainless Steel	Historical	WIN	
2006	Rise of Nations: Rise of Legends	Big Huge	Fantasy	WIN	Sequel to Rise of Nations.
2006	Smiley Commandos	Flying Iron, James Software	Sci-fi	WIN	
2006	SpellForce 2: Shadow Wars	Phenomic	Fantasy	WIN	Sequel to SpellForce: The Order of Dawn.
2006	Star Wars: Empire at War	Petroglyph	Sci-fi	OSX, WIN	
2006	Stronghold Legends	Firefly	Fantasy	WIN	
2006	The Settlers II (10th Anniversary)	Blue Byte	Fantasy	WIN	City builder & RTS. Remake of The Settlers II.
2006	Vikings	Saturn Plus	Fantasy	WIN	(Викинги)
2006	Warhammer: Mark of Chaos	Black Hole Entertainment	Sci-fi, Fantasy	WIN, XB360	Real-time tactics.
2006	Ys Strategy	Marvelous	Fantasy	DS	
2007	Battlestations: Midway	Eidos Hungary	Historical	XB360, WIN, OSX	Real-time tactics.
2007	Bos Wars	Stratagus team	Sci-fi	WIN, LIN, OSX	Cross-platform, free software RTS game.
2007	Command & Conquer 3: Tiberium Wars	EA	Sci-fi	OSX, WIN, XB360	Sequel to Command & Conquer: TS.
2007	Empire Earth III	Mad Doc Software	Historical, Sci-fi	WIN	Sequel to Empire Earth II.
2007	Genesis Rising: The Universal Crusade	Metamorf	Sci-fi	WIN	
2007	GrimGrimoire	Vanillaware	Fantasy	PS2	
2007	Heroes of Mana	Brownie Brown	Fantasy	DS	
2007	Left Behind: Tribulation Forces	Left Behind Games	Sci-fi	WIN	Sequel to Left Behind: EF.
2007	Machines at War	Isotope 244	Sci-fi	WIN, OSX	
2007	Maelstrom	KD Vision	Sci-fi	WIN	
2007	The Settlers: Rise of an Empire	Blue Byte	Fantasy	WIN	City builder & RTS. Sequel to The Settlers: Heritage of Kings.
2007	Sombras de Guera: La Guerra Civil Española	Legend Studios	Historical, Alternate History	WIN	ES language only.
2007	State of War 2: Arcon	Cypron Studios	Sci-fi	WIN	Sequel to State of War.
2007	Stranger	Fireglow Games	Fantasy	WIN	
2007	Sudden Strike 3: Arms for Victory	Fireglow	Historical	WIN	Real-time tactics. Sequel to Sudden Strike 2.
2007	SunAge	Vertex4	Sci-fi	WIN	
2007	Supreme Commander	Gas Powered	Sci-fi	WIN, XB360	
2007	Theatre of War	1C	Historical	WIN	Real-time tactics.
2007	Universe at War: Earth Assault	Petroglyph	Sci-fi	WIN, XB360	
2007	War Front: Turning Point	Digital Reality	Sci-fi	WIN	
2007	World in Conflict	Massive	Alternate history	PS3, WIN, XB360	Real-time tactics.
2008	Age of Booty	Certain Affinity	Historical		
2008	Aggression: Reign Over Europe	Lesta Studio	Historical	WIN	
2008	Command & Conquer: Red Alert 3	EA	Alternate History, Sci-fi	WIN, XB360, PS3	Sequel to Command & Conquer: RA2.
2008	Harvest: Massive Encounter	Oxeye Game Studio	Sci-fi	WIN	Tower defense RTS.
2008	Multiwinia	Introversion	Sci-fi		Sequel to Darwinia.
2008	Perimeter 2: New Earth	KDV Games	Sci-fi	WIN	Sequel to Perimeter.
2008	Populous DS	Genki	Fantasy	DS	
2008	Priority: Survive	Distortum	Sci-fi	WIN	
2008	Seven Kingdoms: Conquest	Enlight Software	Fantasy	WIN	Sequel to Seven Kingdoms II: The Fryhtan Wars.
2008	Shattered Suns	Clear Crown	Sci-fi	WIN	
2008	Sins of a Solar Empire	Ironclad	Sci-fi	WIN	4X RTS.
2008	Supreme Ruler 2020	BattleGoat	Sci-fi	WIN	Sequel to Supreme Ruler 2010.
2008	The Golden Horde	World Forge	Historical	WIN	
2008	Tom Clancy's EndWar	Ubisoft	Modern	WIN, PS3, XB360	Real-time tactics.
2008	WorldShift	Black Sea	Sci-fi	WIN	
2008	Command and Destroy	Cypron Studios	Sci-fi	DS	Real-time strategy
2009	Age of Alexander	World Forge	Historical	WIN	
2009	AI War: Fleet Command	Arcen Games	Sci-fi	WIN	Real-time grand strategy.
2009	Anno 1404	Related Designs	Historical	WIN	Society Strategy. Sequel to Anno 1701.
2009	BattleForge	EA Phenomic	Fantasy	WIN	
2009	Battlestations: Pacific	Eidos Hungary	Historical	XB360, WIN, OSX	Real-time tactics. Sequel to Battlestations: Midway.
2009	BC Kings	Mascot Entertainment	Prehistoric	WIN	Warcraft III clone.
2009	Creeper World	Knuckle Cracker	Sci-fi	WIN, OSX	Tower defense RTS.
2009	Globulation 2	Globulation 2 Team	Fantasy		
2009	Halo Wars	Ensemble	Sci-fi	XB360, XBO, WIN	Has a 2017 remaster: "Halo Wars: Definitive Edition".
2009	Majesty 2: The Fantasy Kingdom Sim	1C:Ino-Co	Fantasy	WIN	Sequel to Majesty: The Fantasy Kingdom Sim.
2009	Men of War	Best Way	Historical	WIN	Real-time tactics.
2009	Order of War	Wargaming	Historical	WIN	Real-time tactics.
2009	Spring:1944	Free Software community	Historical	LIN, WIN	
2009	Stalin vs. Martians	Black Wing Foundation, Dreamlore, N-Game	Fantasy	WIN	
2009	Stormrise	Creative Assembly	Sci-fi	WIN	Real-time tactics.
2009	Supremacy 1914	Bytro Labs	Historical	WIN	Grand strategy.
2009	Swords & Soldiers	Ronimo Games	Fantasy, Alternate history	Wii	Side-scroller.
2009	Warhammer 40,000: Dawn of War II	Relic	Sci-fi, Fantasy	WIN, LIN, OSX	Sequel to Warhammer 40,000: DoW.
2010	0 A.D.	Wildfire Games	Historical	WIN, MAC, LIN	
2010	Command & Conquer 4: Tiberian Twilight	EA	Sci-fi	WIN	Sequel to Command & Conquer 3: TW.
2010	ControlCraft 1	Elite Games Ltd	Fantasy	WEB, iOS, DROID	Fast, sidescrolling RTS. Late Android port in 2016.
2010	Hegemony: Philip of Macedon	Longbow Games	Historical	WIN	Prequel to Hegemony Gold: Wars of Ancient Greece.
2010	Land Air Sea Warfare	Isotope 244	Sci-fi	WIN, OSX, iOS, DROID	Sequel to Machines at War.
2010	Left Behind 3: Rise of the Antichrist	Left Behind Games	Futuristic	WIN	Sequel to Left Behind: TF.
2010	MegaGlest	Free Software community	Fantasy	LIN, OSX, WIN	Fork and continuation of Glest.
2010	OpenRA	Free Software community	Sci-fi	WIN, OSX, LIN	Game engine recreation of Command & Conquer: Red Alert.
2010	Paper Wars: Cannon Fodder	iFun4all	Fantasy	PSP, iOS, Wii, NS	Tower defense.
2010	R.U.S.E	Eugen Systems	Historic	OSX, WIN, PS3, XB360	Real-time tactics.
2010	StarCraft II: Wings of Liberty	Blizzard	Sci-fi	OSX, WIN	First full 3D in StarCraft series, and the beginning of the StarCraft II series.
2010	Supreme Commander 2	Gas Powered	Sci-fi	OSX, WIN, XB360	Sequel to Supreme Commander.
2010	The Settlers 7: Paths to a Kingdom	Blue Byte	Fantasy	OSX, WIN	City builder & RTS. Sequel to The Settlers: Rise of an Empire.
2010	Zero-K	Free Software community	Sci-fi	LIN, WIN	
2011	A Game of Thrones: Genesis	Cyanide	Fantasy	WIN	
2011	Achron	Hazardous Software	Sci-fi	WIN	'4D' RTS with Time Travel story and mechanics.
2011	Anno 2070	Related Designs, Blue Byte	Sci-fi	WIN	Society Strategy. Sequel to Anno 1404.
2011	APOX	BlueGiant Interactive	Sci-fi	WIN	
2011	Creeper World 2: Redemption	Knuckle Cracker	Sci-fi	WIN, OSX	Sequel to Creeper World.
2011	Defenders of Ardania	Most Wanted Entertainment	Fantasy		hybrid tower defense and real-time strategy video game.
2011	Left Behind: World At War	Inspired Media Entertainment	Futuristic	WIN	Sequel to Left Behind 3.
2011	Men of War: Assault Squad	Digitalmindsoft	Historical	WIN	Real-time tactics.
2011	Pirates of Black Cove	Nitro Games	Historical	WIN	
2011	Rusted Warfare - RTS	Corroding Games	Sci-fi	DROID, WIN, LIN, OSX, iOS	Android name: Rusted Warfare - RTS Strategy.
2011	Stronghold 3	Firefly Studios	Historical	WIN, LIN, OSX	Sequel to Stronghold 2.
2012	Arena Wars 2	exDream	Sci-fi	WIN	Sequel to Arena Wars.
2012	Carrier Command: Gaea Mission	Bohemia Interactive	Sci-fi	WIN	Real-time tactics with vehicle simulation.
2012	ControlCraft 2	Elite Games Ltd	Sci-fi	iOS, DROID, WEB, WIN, OSX	Sequel to ControlCraft. Better than Galcon series, Mushroom Wars & Planets Under Attack.
2012	Gemini Wars	Camel101	Sci-fi	WIN, OSX	
2012	Machines at War 3	Isotope 244	Sci-fi	WIN, OSX	Sequel to Land Air Sea Warfare.
2012	Naval War: Arctic Circle	Turbo Tape Games	Contemporary	WIN	
2012	Oil Rush	UNIGINE Company	Sci-fi	WIN	Tower defense elements.
2012	Star Prospector	Cryptstone Games	Sci-fi	WIN	RTS with RPG elements.
2012	Stronghold: HD	Firefly	Historical	WIN	Modest enhancement of Stronghold (2001).
2012	Wargame: European Escalation	Eugen Systems	Historical, Alternate History	WIN	Real-time tactics.
2013	Age of Empires II: HD Edition	Hidden Path Entertainment	Historical	WIN	Modest enhancement of Age of Empires II: TAoK and The Conquerors expansion.
2013	Battle of the Sands	HeroicFantasyGames.com	Sci-fi	WIN, OSX, LIN	Inspired by Dune II.
2013	Citadels	Games Distillery	History, Fantasy	WIN	
2013	Command: Modern Air Naval Operations	Matrix Games	Modern War, Alternate History	WIN	Map only, Earth-wide, Real time all-out-warfare strategy sim, Scenario editor.
2013	Company of Heroes 2	Relic	Historical	WIN	Sequel to Company of Heroes.
2013	ControlCraft 3	Elite Games Ltd	Sci-fi	iOS, DROID, WEB, WIN, OSX	Sequel to ControlCraft 2.
2013	Creeper World 3: Arc Eternal	Knuckle Cracker	Sci-fi	WIN, OSX, LIN	Sequel to Creeper World 2: Redemption.
2013	Divinity: Dragon Commander	Larian Studios	Sci-fi, Fantasy	WIN	Features a hybrid of gameplay styles.
2013	LittleWarGame	jbs, LWG Dev Team	Fantasy	WEB	Top-down 2D game.
2013	Pikmin 3	Nintendo	Sci-fi	WiiU	Sequel to Pikmin 2.
2013	Timelines: Assault on America	4Flash Interactive	Alternate History	WIN, MAC, LIN	
2013	War Of The Zombie: Real-Time & Turn-Based Strategy Simulation	Jacques Deul, Van der Veer Games	Post-apocalypse	iOS, DROID, WIN, OSX	Top down turn-based sim, RTS. iOS in 2013, Android in 2014; PC in 2018.
2013	Wargame: AirLand Battle	Eugen Systems	Historical, Alternate History	WIN	Real-time tactics. Sequel to Wargame: European Escalation.
2014	Age of Mythology: Extended Edition	SkyBox Labs	Mythology	OSX, WIN	Modest enhancement of Age of Mythology and The Titans expansion.
2014	Ancient Space	CreativeForge Games	Sci-fi	WIN, OSX	
2014	Evolution RTS	Free Software community	Sci-fi	LIN, WIN	
2014	Hegemony Rome: The Rise of Caesar	Longbow Games	Historical	WIN	Sequel to Hegemony Gold: Wars of Ancient Greece.
2014	Infested Planet	Rocket Bear Games	Sci-fi	WIN, OSX	Real-time strategy, tower defense.
2014	Men of War: Assault Squad 2	Digitalmindsoft	Historical	WIN	Real-time tactics. Sequel to Men of War: Assault Squad.
2014	Meridian: New World	Elder Games	Sci-fi	WIN	
2014	Planetary Annihilation	Uber Entertainment	Sci-fi	WIN, OSX, LIN	Spiritual successor to Total Annihilation.
2014	Stronghold Crusader II	Firefly Studios	Historical	WIN	Sequel to Stronghold Crusader.
2014	Ultimate General: Gettysburg	Game-Labs	Historical	WIN	Real-time tactics.
2014	Wargame: Red Dragon	Eugen Systems	Historical, Alternate History	WIN	Real-time tactics. Sequel to Wargame: AirLand Battle.
2015	Act of Aggression	Eugen Systems	Contemporary, Sci-fi	WIN	Real-time tactics. Sequel to Act of War: Direct Action.
2015	Age of Empires: World Domination	KLab Inc.	Historical	iOS, DROID	F2P title. Delisted 2016.
2015	Caveman Craig	Parabox	Prehistoric	WIN	2D side-scroller RTS
2015	Etherium	Tindalos Interactive	Sci-fi	WIN	
2015	Executive Assault	Hesketh Studios	Sci-fi	WIN	FPS/RTS Hybrid.
2015	Grey Goo	Petroglyph Games	Sci-fi	WIN	
2015	Hegemony III: Clash of the Ancients	Longbow Games	Historical	WIN	Sequel to Hegemony Rome: The Rise of Caesar.
2015	Homeworld Remastered Collection	Gearbox Software	Sci-fi	WIN	Remaster of Homeworld and Homeworld 2.
2015	Nightside	Omnidream Creations	Sci-fi	WIN, LIN	
2015	Swords & Soldiers II: Shawarmageddon	Ronimo Games	Fantasy, Alternate history	WiiU, WIN, PS4, NS	Sequel to Swords & Soldiers.
2015	War for the Overworld	Brightrock Games	Fantasy	WIN, OSX, LIN	Dungeon management game.
2016	8-Bit Armies	Petroglyph Games	Modern, Sci-fi	WIN, PS4, XBO	Blocky voxel graphics.
2016	8-Bit Hordes	Petroglyph Games	Fantasy	WIN, PS4, XBO	Blocky voxel graphics.
2016	8-Bit Invaders	Petroglyph Games	Sci-fi	WIN, PS4, XBO	Blocky voxel graphics.
2016	Anno 2205	Blue Byte	Sci-fi	WIN	Society Strategy. Sequel to Anno 2070.
2016	Ashes of the Singularity	Oxide Games, Stardock	Sci-fi	WIN	
2016	Battlefleet Gothic: Armada	Tindalos Interactive	Sci-fi	WIN	Real-time tactics.
2016	Castle Battles	Light Arc Studio	Fantasy	WIN, OSX, iOS, DROID	Simple 2D, hex-based, amoeba-style title with candy artwork. Borrows from Galcon Fusion, Mushroom Wars, Planets Under Attack & Control Craft 2.
2016	Cossacks 3	GSC Game World	Historical	WIN, OSX, LIN	Sequel to Cossacks 2.
2016	Flesh Eaters: Retro Zombie Survival	16 Bit Nights	Horror	WIN	Survival RTS.
2016	Homeworld: Deserts of Kharak	Blackbird Interactive	Sci-fi	WIN	
2016	Kingdom Wars 2: Battles	Reverie World Studios	Fantasy	WIN	Sequel to Dawn of Fantasy.
2016	Meridian: Squad 22	Elder Games	Sci-fi	WIN	Sequel to Meridian: New World.
2016	Offworld Trading Company	Mohawk Games	Sci-fi	WIN, OSX	Economic strategy.
2016	reconquest	StormCube Games	Sci-fi	WIN	
2017	Age of Empires Online: Celeste Fan Project	Project Celeste Development Team	History	WIN, LIN	Enhancement of AoE Online.
2017	Beyond All Reason	Free Software community	Sci-fi	LIN, WIN	
2017	Blitzkrieg 3	Nival	Historical	WIN, OSX, LIN	Real-time tactics. Sequel to Blitzkrieg 2.
2017	Command: Chains of War	Matrix Games	Modern War, Alternate history	WIN	Map only, Earth-wide, RTS, all-out-warfare sim, Scenario editor.
2017	Forts	Earthwork Games	Sci-fi	WIN	2D physics. Like Crush the Castle; Worms.
2017	Halo Wars 2	The Creative Assembly, 343 Industries	Sci-fi	WIN, XBO	Sequel to Halo Wars.
2017	HYPERNOVA: Escape from Hadea	ActaLogic	Sci-fi	WIN, LIN, OSX	Big tower defense mix.
2017	Iron Marines	Ironhide Game Studio	Sci-fi	iOS, DROID, WIN, LIN, OSX	Casual title with cartoon art.
2017	Planet X2	The 8-bit Guy	Sci-fi	C64, WIN, OSX	Very retro 1980s C64-style pixels.
2017	SpellForce 3	THQ Nordic	Fantasy	WIN, XBO, XBX/S, PS4, PS5	Sequel to SpellForce 2: Shadow Wars.
2017	StarCraft: Remastered	Blizzard	Sci-fi	WIN	Remaster of StarCraft & SC: Brood War.
2017	Steel Division: Normandy 44	Eugen Systems	Historical	WIN	Real-time tactics.
2017	Sudden Strike 4	Kite Games	Historical	WIN	Real-time tactics. Sequel to Sudden Strike 3: AfV.
2017	Syrian Warfare	Cats Who Play	Modern war	WIN	Real-time tactics.
2017	Tooth and Tail	Pocketwatch Games	Fantasy	WIN, LIN, OSX, PS4	
2017	Ultimate General: Civil War	Game-Labs	Historical	WIN	Real-time tactics; new TBS mode. Sequel to UG: Gettysburg.
2017	Warhammer 40,000: Dawn of War III	Relic	Sci-fi	WIN, LIN, OSX	Sequel to Warhammer 40,000: DoW.
2018	Rise of Kingdoms.	Neo Generation Rise of	Satire	WIN	A Meta Game Jam entry mocking the APM idea.
2018	Age of Empires: Definitive Edition	Forgotten Empires, Tantalus Media	Historical	WIN	Remaster of Age of Empires.
2018	Ancestors Legacy	Destructive Creations	Historical	WIN	
2018	Call to Arms	Digitalmindsoft	Contemporary	WIN	Real-time tactics.
2018	Empires Apart	DESTINYbit	Historical	WIN	
2018	Forged Battalion	Petroglyph	Sci-fi	WIN	
2018	Frostpunk	11 Bit Studios	Sci-fi	WIN	Survival strategy.
2018	Galactic Frontline	NetEase Games	Sci-fi	iOS, DROID	Online title. Delisted after 2019.
2018	Judgment: Apocalypse Survival Simulation	Suncrash	Modern, Post-Apocalyptic	WIN	Base management, survival.
2018	Loria	Loria	Fantasy	WIN, OSX, LIN	Warcraft 2-3 homage.
2018	Northgard	Shiro Games	Fantasy	WIN	
2018	Planet X3	The 8-bit Guy	Sci-fi	DOS, WIN, OSX	Sequel of Planet X2 in 1990s MS-DOS-style pixels.
2018	The Settlers: History Collection	Blue Byte	Fantasy	WIN	Enhanced gold versions of 1st 7 The Settlers titles.
2019	Age of Empires II: Definitive Edition	Xbox Games Studios	Historical	WIN, PS5, XBO, XBX/S	Remaster of Age of Empires II.
2019	AI War 2	Arcen Games	Sci-fi	WIN	Sequel to AI War: Fleet Command.
2019	Anno 1800	Blue Byte	Historical	WIN	Society Strategy. Sequel to Anno 2205.
2019	BANNERMEN	Pathos Interactive	Fantasy	WIN	Low fantasy.
2019	Battlefleet Gothic: Armada 2	Tindalos Interactive	Sci-fi	WIN	Real-time tactics. Sequel to Battlefleet Gothic: Armada.
2019	Conan Unconquered	Petroglyph Games	Fantasy	WIN	Survival strategy.
2019 (EA)	It Stares Back	Light Arc Studio	Dark fantasy	WIN	Darker sequel to Castle Battles with RPG elements. Similar to Eufloria. *Dev updates only in Discord.
2019	Medieval Kingdom Wars	Reverie World Studios	Historical	WIN	Sequel to Kingdom Wars 2: Battles. Real-time grand strategy.
2019	Million Lords	Million Victories	Fantasy	DROID, iOS	RTS game on mobile.
2019	Re-Legion	Ice Code Games	Sci-fi	WIN	Cyberpunk RTS.
2019	Steel Division 2	Eugen Systems	Historical	WIN	Real-time tactics. Sequel to Steel Division: Normandy 44.
2019	Taste of Power	OneOcean LLC	Alternate medieval history	WIN	
2019	They Are Billions	Numantian Games	Sci-fi	WIN, PS4, XBO	Survival strategy.
2019	Warparty	Warcave, Crazy Monkey Studios	Fantasy, Prehistoric	WIN	PC name: War Party.
2019	War Selection	Glyph Worlds	Historical	WIN	
2020	A Year of Rain	Daedalic Entertainment	Fantasy	WIN	Like Warcraft III.
2020	Age of Empires III: Definitive Edition	Xbox Games Studios	Historical	WIN	Remaster of Age of Empires III.
2020	Beetle Uprising	Iocane Games	Nature	WIN	Has genetic engineering.
2020	Command & Conquer: Remastered Collection	Petroglyph Games	Alternate History, Sci-fi	WIN	Remaster of Tiberian Dawn and Red Alert.
2020	Creeper World 4	Knuckle Cracker	Sci-fi	WIN	Sequel to Creeper World 3: Arc Eternal, & 1st 3D game in series.
2020	Iron Harvest	King Art Games	Sci-fi	WIN, PS5, XBX/S	1920+ alt. history.
2020	Radio General	Foolish Mortals	Historical	WIN, OSX, LIN	Real-time strategy.
2020	Star Maidens Chronicle: Definitive Edition	PROJECT YNP	Fantasy	WIN	
2020	War Room	Binge Gaming OU, Wastelands Interactive	Modern	WIN	
2020	Warcraft III: Reforged	Blizzard	Fantasy	WIN	Remastered 3D graphics.
2021	Age of Empires IV	Relic Entertainment	Historical	WIN, XBO, XBX/S	Sequel to Age of Empires III.
2021	Ancestors Legacy: Vikings	GameClub	Historical	iOS	First port of Ancestors Legacy with only Viking portion.
2021	Andalia	Joel St.	Fantasy	WIN	
2021	BlackChain	Borington	Futuristic	WIN	Heavily inspired by StarCraft II.
2021	Carrier Command 2	Geometa	Sci-fi	WIN, MAC	Vehicle sim. Sequel to Carrier Command.
2021	Evil Genius 2: World Domination	Rebellion Developments	Spy	WIN, XBO, XBX/S, PS4, PS5	Sequel to Evil Genius.
2021	Eximius: Seize the Frontline	Ammobox Studios	Sci-fi	WIN	FPS/RTS hybrid.
2021	Five Nations	Silver Forge Studios	Sci-fi	WIN	Inspired by classic 2D RTS games.
2021	Island Crusaders	Keaton Applebaum	Fantasy	WIN	Like Bad North. Polygonal GFX.
2021	Kingdom Wars 4	Reverie World Studios	Historical	WIN	Sequel to Medieval Kingdom Wars.
2021	Lambda Wars	Vortal Storm	Post-apocalypse	WIN	MP-focused Alien Swarm mod in Half-Life 2 universe. 2014 beta release.
2021 (EA)	Stellar Warfare	Tense Games	Sci-fi	WIN	Base building, ship editing, mining. Inspired by classic RTS games.
2021	Stronghold: Warlords	Firefly Studios	Historical	WIN, OSX	
2021	Widelands	Widelands Development Team	History	WIN, LIN, OSX, AMI, BSD	Slower RTS like first 2 The Settlers titles.
2022	Age of Jura	Mystic ERA games	Fantasy	WIN	
2022 (EA)	Ancient Wars: Sparta Definitive Edition	Jotasoft Studios	Historical	WIN	Additive remaster of Ancient Wars: Sparta.
2022	Chromosome Evil	16 Bit Nights	Horror	WIN	Sequel to Flesh Eaters: Retro Zombie Survival. Turn-based management, action RTS.
2022	Crossfire: Legion	Blackbird Interactive	Sci-fi	WIN	
2022	GrimGrimoire OnceMore	Vanillaware	Fantasy	PS4, NS, PS5	Remaster of GrimGrimoire.
2022	Iron Marines Invasion	Ironhide Game Studio	Sci-fi	DROID, iOS, WIN	Sequel to Iron Marines.
2022	Knights of Honor II: Sovereign	Black Sea Games	Historical	WIN	Sequel to Knights of Honor.
2022	Line War	Studio Centurion	Sci-fi	WIN, MAC	RTS with 4X elements.
2022	Starship Troopers: Terran Command	The Artistocrats	Sci-fi	WIN	
2022	Warpips	Skirmish Mode Games	Contemporary	WIN, NS, XBO, XBX/S, PS4, PS5	
2023	Age of Cores	Clicker Industries, Tomas Zachar	Sci-fi	WEB	Top-down, 2D, roguelike RTS & RPG.
2023	Company of Heroes 3	Relic	Historical	WIN, PS5, XBX/S	Sequel to Company of Heroes 2.
2023	Drevepsina	yiotro	Abstract	DROID, iOS, WIN	Minimalist, 2D, top-down GFX.
2023	Dune: Spice Wars	Shiro Games	Sci-fi	WIN, XBX/S	RTS with 4X elements.
2023	Emergency	Sixteen Tons Entertainment	Modern	WIN	Spinoff in 16 Tons' Emergency video game series. F2P RTS depicting different emergency services.
2023	Executive Assault 2	Hesketh Studios	Sci-fi	WIN, OSX	FPS/RTS Hybrid. Sequel to Executive Assault.
2023	Gord	Covenant.dev	Mythology	WIN, PS5, XBX/S	Adventure, survival RTS.
2023	Minecraft Legends	Blackbird Interactive, Mojang Studios	Fantasy	WIN, PS4, XBO, NS, PS5, XBX/S	Strategy-action hybrid spinoff of Minecraft.
2023	Pikmin 4	Nintendo	Sci-fi	NS	Sequel to Pikmin 3.
2023	Stronghold: Definitive Edition	Firefly	Historical	WIN	Remaster of Stronghold with new enhancements, content & features.
2023	The Great War: Western Front	Petroglyph Games	Historical	WIN	
2023	The Settlers: New Allies	Blue Byte	Historical	WIN, XBO, XBX/S, PS4, PS5, NS, Luna	City builder & RTS. Sequel to The Settlers 7: Paths to a Kingdom.
2023	Warhammer Age of Sigmar: Realms of Ruin	Frontier Developments	Fantasy	WIN, PS5, XBX/S	
2023	Warpaws	Slipgate Ironworks	Sci-fi	WIN, PS5, XBX/S, NS	
2024	2089 - Space Divided	CoastGames	Sci-fi	WIN	
2024	9-Bit Armies: A Bit Too Far	Petroglyph Games	Modern	WIN	Bigger sequel to 8-Bit Armies.
2024	Age of Empires Mobile	World's Edge, TiMi Studio Group	Historical	iOS, DROID	F2P title.
2024	Age of Goblins	Bruno Valla	Fantasy	WIN	Simplified RTS with 2D cartoon GFX.
2024	Age of Mythology: Retold	World's Edge, Forgotten Empires, Tantalus Media, CaptureAge, Virtuos Games	Mythology	WIN, XBX/S, PS5	Huge remake of Age of Mythology with Age of Empires III: DE engine.
2024 (EA)	Ancient Wars: Medieval Crusades	Jotasoft Studios	Historical	WIN	Sequel to Ancient Wars: Sparta Definitive Edition.
2024	Battle for Vera	Matic	Sci-fi	WIN	Basic pixels. Like Dune II and Command & Conquer.
2024	Beneath the Mountain	Omnis Rector Studios	Fantasy	WIN	City-builder mix.
2024	Chromosome Evil 2	16 Bit Nights	Horror	WIN	Sequel to Chromosome Evil.
2024	Creeper World IXE	Knuckle Cracker	Sci-fi	WIN	Sequel to Creeper World 4. Returned to 2D pixels.
2024	Diplomacy is Not an Option	Door 407	Historical, fantasy	WIN	Survival strategy.
2024	Empire of the Ants (2024)	Tower Five	Nature	WIN, XBX/S, PS5	2nd game based on 1991 namesake novel.
2024	Empires of the Undergrowth	Slug Disco	Nature	WIN, OSX, LIN	Colony sim & RTS.
2024	Fair and Square	Octopus Engine	Fantasy	WIN, LIN	Basic retro pixels.
2024 (EA)	From Glory To Goo	Stratagem Blue	Sci-fi	WIN	Survival RTS.
2024 (EA)	Godsworn	Thunderoak Interactive	Fantasy	WIN	Mythological Real-time Strategy.
2024	Homeworld 3	Blackbird Interactive	Sci-fi	WIN	Sequel to Homeworld 2.
2024	Homeworld: Vast Reaches	FarBridge	Sci-fi	Quest, WIN	VR title.
2024 (EA)	Industrial Annihilation	Galactic Annihilation	Sci-fi	WIN	Factory builder mix. Sequel to Planetary Annihilation.
2024	Manor Lords	Slavic Magic	Historical	WIN, XBO, XBX/S	City-building & real-time tactics.
2024	Men of War II	Best Way	Historical	WIN, LIN	Real-time tactics. Sequel to Men of War.
2024	Nuke Them All	GameEraStudios	Sci-fi	WIN	Cartoony RTS inspired by classic titles: Z, KKnD and C&C: Red Alert 2; and modern titles: C&C: Generals, Company of Heroes and They Are Billions.
2024	Operation: Polygon Storm	Toxic Studio	Modern	WIN, NS, XBO, XBX/S, PS4, PS5	Simple, mini RTS & auto battler.
2024	Renaissance Kingdom Wars	Reverie World Studios	Historical	WIN	5th main title in Kingdom Wars series. Real-time grand strategy.
2024	Rise Eterna War	Makee, Beast Games	Fantasy	WIN, NS, XBO, XBX/S, PS4, PS5	Deck builder; side-view, mini RTS. Prequel to turn-based SRPG, Rise Eterna.
2024	Shrot	Spytihněv	Sci-fi	WIN	WW sequel to Czech RTS, Paranoia!.
2024	Sins of a Solar Empire II	Ironclad Games	Sci-fi	WIN	Sequel to Sins of a Solar Empire.
2024	Stardust Exile	Apseren	Sci-fi	WIN, LIN	Many modes set in galaxy.
2024	Terminator: Dark Fate - Defiance	Slitherine Ltd.	Sci-fi, Post-apocalypse	WIN	
2024	TFC: The Fertile Crescent	Wield Interactive	Historical	WIN, LIN, OSX	Like Age of Empires.
2024	To the Stars	Stellar Cartography Interactive	Sci-fi	WIN, OSX	2D side-view roguelike. More complex than Galcon.
2024	Toy Tactics	Kraken Empire	Fantasy	WIN	Uses drawing to move units.
2024	Ultimate General: American Revolution	Game-Labs	Historical	WIN	Grand strategy upgrade from prior UG titles.
2024	Warcraft Remastered Battle Chest	Blizzard	Fantasy	WIN, OSX	Has remasters of 1st 3 main Warcraft titles.
2024	WARNO	Eugen Systems	Historical, Alternate History	WIN	TBS, real-time tactics. Spiritual successor to the Wargame series.
2024 (EA)	White Sands	Binge Gaming OU	Post-apocalypse	WIN	
2025	Age of Darkness: Final Stand	PlaySide	Fantasy	WIN	Survival strategy.
2025	Age of Respair	Respair Games	History	WIN	Like Stronghold 2.
2025 (EA)	Ascendance	Torchdrive Industries	Sci-fi	WIN	Real-time grand strategy.
2025 (EA)	Battlefall: State of Conflict	Kyoto Video Game Concern	Sci-fi, Post-apocalypse	WIN	Inspired by C&C 2: Tiberian Sun and C&C: Red Alert 2.
2025	Bread & Bravery	Ennoble Studios	Historical	WIN	Settlement builder, castle sim mix.
2025	Cataclismo	Digital Sun	Dark Fantasy, Alternate History	WIN	Survival RTS & tower defense mix.
2025	Corsairs: Battle of the Caribbean	Fishing Cactus	Historical	WIN, NS, XBO, PS4, PS5, XBX/S	Reboot of Corsairs: Conquest at Sea.
2025 (EA)	Counter Clash	Bjenssen	Fantasy	WIN	2D cartoon.
2025	D.O.T. Defence	Rattleaxe Games	Parody	WIN, LIN, NS	Short tower defence mix.
2025	Drone Sector	Icosphere	Futuristic	WIN	Vehicular combat mix.
2025 (EA)	Dying Breed	Sarnayer	Post-apocalyptic	WIN	
2025	Eyes of War	Good Mood Games	Historical	WIN, LIN	Action RTS.
2025	Falling Frontier	Stutter Fox Studios	Sci-fi	WIN	Real-time grand strategy in local space.
2025	Flow of War	Rongcon Games	Fantasy	WIN	Like early Warcraft's. Has auto-micro.
2025	Fragile Existence	Fragile Continuum	Futuristic	WIN	4X mix.
2025	IDUN - Frontline Survival	IDUN Interactive	Sci-fi	WIN, LIN, OSX	Defense mix.
2025 (EA)	Moduwar	Biohex Studios	Sci-fi	WIN, LIN, OSX	Biological adaptation RTS.
2025	Noble's Life: Kingdom Reborn	Gentle Griffons	Historical	WIN	First-person medieval sim.
2025	Paper Battlefield	Bros Ogon's	Modern War	WIN, LIN, OSX	Sketch maps.
2025	Ratten Reich	Metall Adler Studio	Fantasy	WIN	
2025	Realms of Madness	Robin van der Horst	Fantasy	WIN	Side-view 2D.
2025	Resident Evil: Survival Unit	Aniplex, JOYCITY	Post-apocalypse	iOS, DROID	1st Resident Evil RTS.
2025	Repterra	Chute Apps	Sci-fi	WIN, LIN, OSX	Survival RTS. Has genetic engineering.
2025	Small Kingdoms	Bad Logic Studios	Fantasy	WIN	Real-time grand strategy. Made on Medieval Kingdom Wars' engine.
2025	StarSim: BattleZone	Viktor Martynovsky	Sci-fi	WIN	
2025	Stormgate	Frost Giant Studios	Sci-fi/Fantasy	WIN	Made by ex-Blizzard vets.
2025	Stronghold Crusader: Definitive Edition	Firefly Studios	Historical	WIN	Big, additive remaster of Stronghold: Crusader.
2025	Tactical Warfare	Mizrab	Sci-fi	WIN, LIN, OSX	
2025	Tempest Rising	Slipgate Ironworks	Alternate history, Sci-fi	WIN	Inspired by Command & Conquer.
2025	The Touhou Empires	Neetpia	Fantasy	WIN	Dōjin game. Part of Touhou Project series.
2025	Tinycraft	Zhuojiu Games	Fantasy	WIN	Top-down 2D, roguelite.
2025	Warfactory	Almost Games, Terricon Games	Sci-fi	WIN	Factory builder mix.
2025	Warhammer 40,000: Dawn of War – Definitive Edition	Relic Entertainment	Sci-fi	WIN	Light remaster of Warhammer 40,000: DoW & expansions.
2026 (EA)	Dinolords	Northplay ApS	Alternate history	WIN, OSX	
2026	Game of Thrones: War for Westeros	PlaySide	Fantasy	WIN	Set in Game of Thrones show.
2026 (EA)	Heart of Muriet	Microtale, Cratr.games	Fantasy	WIN	Chonky voxels. Inspired by 8+ classics.
2026	Knights Province	Krom Stern	Historical	WIN	Economic focus.
2026 (EA)	Liquidation	Divio	Fantasy, Sci-fi	WIN	Like Warcraft III; Warhammer 40K: DoW.
2026 (EA)	Stronghold 4	Firefly Studios	Historical	WIN	Prequel to Stronghold.
2026	The Last General	Wakety LLC	Modern	WIN, OSX	Like WARNO.
2026 (EA)	ZeroSpace	Starlance Studios, Ironward	Sci-fi	WIN	Real-time grand strategy. Made by StarCraft II pro players.
TBA	Agony: Lords of Hell	Madmind Studio	Fantasy	WIN	
TBA	D.O.R.F. Real-Time Strategic Conflict	DORFteam	Sci-fi	WIN	Made on OpenRA engine that rebuilds early Command & Conquer titles.
TBA	Dust Front RTS	RtsDimon	Post-apocalyptic	WIN	
TBA	Global Conflagration	CTLN7, Neok	Modern war	WIN	
TBA	IMMORTAL: Gates of Pyre	Sunspear Games	Sci-fi, Fantasy	WIN	
TBA	Mythos: Build & Survive	Madnetic Games	Mythology	WIN	
TBA	Sanctuary: Shattered Sun	Enhearten Media	Sci-fi	WIN	

== List of expansions ==
Notes:

- This list is only for big or major expansions. No small or tiny DLC.
- Please don't add "real-time tactics" based expansions to a full, standalone real-time tactics title here. Add them in the RTT list.

Year	Expansion	Developer	Setting	Platform	Notes
1996	Command & Conquer: The Covert Operations	Westwood	Alternate History, Sci-fi	DOS, WIN	Expansion to Command & Conquer.
1996	Warcraft II: Beyond the Dark Portal	Blizzard	Fantasy		Expansion to Warcraft II: ToD.
1997	Command & Conquer: Red Alert - Counterstrike	Westwood	Alternate History, Sci-fi	DOS, WIN	1st expansion to Command & Conquer: RA.
1997	Command & Conquer: Red Alert - The Aftermath	Westwood	Alternate History, Sci-fi	DOS, WIN	2nd expansion to Command & Conquer: RA.
1998	Battle Grounds	Ubisoft, Macmillan	Sci-fi	WIN	1st official expansion for Battlezone.
1998	Dark Colony: The Council Wars	Take-Two Interactive Software	Sci-fi	WIN	Expansion to Dark Colony.
1998	StarCraft: Brood War	Blizzard	Sci-fi	MAC, WIN	Expansion to StarCraft.
1998	The Red Odyssey	Team Evolve	Sci-fi	WIN	2nd official expansion for Battlezone.
1998	Total Annihilation: Battle Tactics	Cavedog	Sci-fi	WIN	Expansion to Total Annihilation.
1998	Total Annihilation: The Core Contingency	Cavedog	Sci-fi	MAC, WIN	Expansion to Total Annihilation.
1999	Corsairs: The New Conquerors	Microïds	Historical	WIN	Expansion to Corsairs: CaS.
2000	Age of Empires II: The Conquerors	Ensemble	Historical	MAC, WIN	Expansion to Age of Empires II: The Age of Kings.
2000	Earth 2150: The Moon Project	Reality Pump Studios	Sci-fi	WIN	Expansion to Earth 2150.
2000	Homeworld: Cataclysm	Barking Dog	Sci-fi	WIN	Expansion to Homeworld.
2001	Command & Conquer: Red Alert 2 - Yuri's Revenge	Westwood	Alternate History, Sci-fi	WIN	Expansion to Command & Conquer: Red Alert 2.
2001	Cossacks: The Art of War	GSC	Historical	WIN	1st SA expansion to Cossacks: EW.
2001	Knights and Merchants: The Peasants Rebellion	Joymania	Fantasy	WIN	SA expansion to Knights and Merchants: TSK.
2001	Kohan: Ahriman's Gift	TimeGate	Fantasy	WIN	Expansion to Kogan: IS.
2002	Battle Realms: Winter of the Wolf	Liquid Entertainment	Fantasy	WIN	Expansion to Battle Realms.
2002	Cossacks: Back to War	GSC	Historical	WIN	2nd SA expansion to Cossacks: EW.
2002	Earth 2150: Lost Souls	Reality Pump Studios	Sci-fi	WIN	Expansion to Earth 2150.
2002	Empire Earth: The Art of Conquest	Mad Doc Software	Historical, Alternate History, Sci-fi	WIN	Expansion to Empire Earth.
2002	Real War: Rogue States	Rival Interactive, Semi Logic Entertainments	Modern War	WIN	Standalone expansion to Real War.
2003	Age of Mythology: The Titans	Ensemble	Mythology	WIN	Expansion to Age of Mythology.
2003	American Conquest: Fight Back	GSC	Historical	WIN	1st SA expansion to American Conquest.
2003	Command & Conquer: Generals – Zero Hour	EA	Modern War	WIN, MAC	Expansion to Command & Conquer: Generals.
2003	Warcraft III: The Frozen Throne	Blizzard	Fantasy		Expansion to Warcraft III: RoC.
2004	Battle Mages: Sign of Darkness	Targem Games	Fantasy	WIN	Stand-alone expansion to Battle Mages.
2004	Rise of Nations: Thrones and Patriots	Big Huge	Historical	OSX, WIN	Expansion to Rise of Nations.
2004	SpellForce: Breath of Winter	Phenomic	Fantasy	WIN	1st expansion to SpellForce: The Order of Dawn
2004	SpellForce: Shadow of the Phoenix	Phenomic	Fantasy	WIN	2nd expansion to SpellForce: The Order of Dawn
2005	Perimeter: Emperor's Testament	K-D Lab	Sci-fi	WIN	Stand-alone expansion to Perimeter.
2005	Warhammer 40,000: Dawn of War: Winter Assault	Relic	Sci-fi, Fantasy	WIN	Expansion to Warhammer 40,000: Dawn of War.
2006	Act of War: High Treason	Eugen	Contemporary, Sci-fi	WIN	Real-time tactics. Expansion to Act of War: Direct Action.
2006	Age of Empires III: The War Chiefs	Ensemble	Historical	OSX, WIN	Expansion to Age of Empires III.
2006	American Conquest: Divided Nation	GSC, Revolution of Strategy	Historical	WIN	2nd SA expansion to American Conquest.
2006	Cossacks II: Battle for Europe	GSC	Historical	WIN	SA expansion to Cossacks II: NW.
2006	Empire Earth II: The Art of Supremacy	Mad Doc Software	Historical, Alternate History, Sci-fi	WIN	Expansion to Empire Earth II.
2006	Legion Arena: Cult of Mithras	Slitherine Strategies	Historical	WIN, OSX	Expansion to Legion Arena.
2006	Lord of the Rings: The Battle for Middle-earth II: The Rise of the Witch-king, The	EA	Fantasy	WIN	Expansion to The Lord of the Rings: The Battle for Middle-earth II.
2006	Star Wars: Empire at War: Forces of Corruption	Petroglyph	Sci-fi	WIN	Expansion to Star Wars: Empire at War.
2006	Warhammer 40,000: Dawn of War: Dark Crusade	Relic	Sci-fi, Fantasy	WIN	1st SA expansion to Warhammer 40,000: DoW.
2007	Age of Empires III: The Asian Dynasties	Ensemble	Historical	WIN	Expansion to Age of Empires III.
2007	Company of Heroes: Opposing Fronts	Relic	Historical	WIN	Expansion to Company of Heroes.
2007	Fate of Hellas	World Forge	Historical	WIN	Stand-alone expansion pack to Ancient Wars: Sparta.
2007	SpellForce 2: Dragon Storm	Phenomic	Fantasy	WIN	1st expansion to SpellForce 2: Shadow Wars.
2007	Supreme Commander: Forged Alliance	Gas Powered	Sci-fi	WIN	Expansion to Supreme Commander.
2008	Command & Conquer 3: Kane's Wrath	EA	Sci-fi	WIN, XB360	Expansion to Command & Conquer 3: TW.
2008	Sombras de Guerra: Objetivo España	Legend Studios SL	Historical, Alternate History	WIN	SA expansion to Sombras de Guera: La Guerra Civil Española.
2008	Warhammer 40,000: Dawn of War: Soulstorm	Relic	Sci-fi, Fantasy	WIN	2nd SA expansion to Warhammer 40,000: DoW.
2009	Command & Conquer: Red Alert 3 – Uprising	EA	Alternate History, Sci-fi	WIN	SA expansion to Command & Conquer: RA3.
2009	Company of Heroes: Tales of Valor	Relic	Historical	WIN	Expansion to Company of Heroes.
2009	World in Conflict: Soviet Assault	Massive	Alternate history	PS3, WIN, XB360	Expansion to World in Conflict.
2010	Sins of a Solar Empire: Trinity	Ironclad	Sci-fi	WIN	Combo of Sins of a Solar Empire & 1st 2 expansions.
2010	Warhammer 40,000: Dawn of War II – Chaos Rising	Relic	Sci-fi, Fantasy	WIN, LIN, OSX	Expansion to Warhammer 40,000: Dawn of War II.
2011	Warhammer 40,000: Dawn of War II – Retribution	Relic	Sci-fi, Fantasy	WIN, LIN, OSX	2nd expansion to Warhammer 40,000: Dawn of War II.
2012	Hegemony Gold: Wars of Ancient Greece	Longbow Games	Historical	WIN	Expansion of Hegemony: Philip of Macedon.
2012	Sins of a Solar Empire: Rebellion	Ironclad	Sci-fi	WIN	First stand-alone expansion to Sins of a Solar Empire.
2012	SpellForce 2: Faith in Destiny	Trine Games	Fantasy	WIN	2nd expansion to SpellForce 2: Shadow Wars.
2013	Age of Empires II HD: The Forgotten	SkyBox Labs, Forgotten Empires	Historical	WIN	1st expansion to Age of Empires II: HD Edition
2013	StarCraft II: Heart of the Swarm	Blizzard	Sci-fi	OSX, WIN	First StarCraft II expansion.
2015	Age of Empires II HD: The African Kingdoms	SkyBox Labs, Forgotten Empires	Historical	WIN	2nd expansion to Age of Empires II: HD Edition
2015	Planetary Annihilation: Titans	Uber Entertainment	Sci-fi	WIN, OSX, LIN	Planetary Annihilation standalone expansion.
2015	StarCraft II: Legacy of the Void	Blizzard	Sci-fi	OSX, WIN	Second StarCraft II expansion.
2016	Age of Empires II HD: Rise of the Rajas	SkyBox Labs, Forgotten Empires	Historical	WIN	3rd expansion to Age of Empires II: HD Edition
2016	Age of Mythology: Tale of the Dragon	Forgotten Empires, SkyBox Labs	Mythology	OSX, WIN	Expansion to Age of Mythology: Extended Edition
2016	Ashes of the Singularity: Escalation	Oxide Games, Stardock	Sci-fi	WIN	Stand-alone expansion to Ashes of the Singularity.
2017	Cossacks 3: Guardians of the Highlands	GSC	Historical	WIN	Expansion to Cossacks 3.
2019	SpellForce 3: Soul Harvest	THQ Nordic	Fantasy	WIN	Standalone expansion to Spellforce 3.
2020	SpellForce 3: Fallen God	THQ Nordic	Fantasy	WIN	Standalone expansion to Spellforce 3.
2021	Call to Arms - Gates of Hell: Ostfront	Digitalmindsoft	Historical	WIN	Real-time tactics. SA expansion to Call to Arms.

== Cancelled games ==
Only cancelled, abandoned, and some delisted titles, with significant work done, are shown here.

Year	Game	Developer	Setting	Platform	Notes
1993	Hard Vacuum	Daniel Cook, Hard Vacuum Team	Sci-fi	WIN, LIN, OSX	Has a 2021 OpenRA remake.
1998	Armor	Bungie	Sci-fi	XB, WIN, OSX, XB360	Changed to 3rd-person shooter, then FPS as Halo: CE.
2002	Chaos	Trigger Soft	Fantasy	WIN	Korean RTS, had pre-release beta CD and high level of completeness.
2007	Inkawar	Luis Grimaldo	Historical	WIN	
2010	SpaceZero	MRevenga	Sci-fi	LIN, BSD	Sidescrolling 2D RTS. Alpha dropped after 2013.
2013	Command & Conquer: Generals 2	Victory Games	Sci-fi	WIN	Cancelled in late 2013.
2022	NeuroSlicers	Dream Harvest	Sci-fi	WIN	Canned late 2022.
2025	Battle Aces	Uncapped Games	Sci-fi	WIN	Mini RTS by ex-Blizzard, Blackbird & Relic devs.

== See also ==
- Lists of video games
- Strategy video game
