= CW3 =

CW3 or CW-3 may refer to:

- CW3, a postcode district in the CW postcode area in Cheshire, England
- CW-3 or Chief Warrant Officer 3, a United States military rank
- CW-3 Duckling, a two-seat amphibian flying-boat
- KDLH, a TV station in Duluth, Minnesota and Superior, Wisconsin affiliated with The CW
- Creeper World 3, the third installment in the Creeper World series
