= Imperivm: Great Battles of Rome =

2004 real-time strategy video game

Imperivm: The Great Battles of Rome
- Developer: Haemimont Games
- Publisher: FX Interactive
- Platform: Windows
- Release: ESP: December 21, 2004
- Genres: Real-time strategy, real-time tactics
- Mode: Single-player

Imperivm: Great Battles of Rome (also known as Imperivm III: Great Battles of Rome, Imperivm RTC: Great Battles of Rome, or Imperium GBR) is a 2004 real-time strategy video game for Microsoft Windows. It is a sequel to the RTS/RPGs Celtic Kings: Rage of War and Imperivm II: The Punic Wars. The game, released in 2004, was developed by Haemimont Games together with FX Interactive. It was re-released on Steam on August 16, 2021.

The game contains various civilizations to choose from, including Rome (Imperial and Republican), Egypt, Germania, Britannia, Iberia, Gaul, and Carthage. It also has a more elaborate hero system than its predecessors.

== Gameplay ==
Gameplay screenshot.

The game focuses on tactics, troop mobility and terrain topography rather than sheer strength of numbers for winning battles. Though resources are important, there is less relevance in gathering them than in other real-time battle games. Instead of sending an army of servants to mine, lumber, collect food or gather any other kind of resources these are generated at a constant rate directly proportional to the inhabitants of a population center.

There are 3 player modes to choose from:

- Conquest: The battles involved on this game are focused on raising an empire by conquering all the known ancient world, and the user can choose any of the available civilizations to do so.
- Rome's Greatest Battles: A good amount of effort has been dedicated to historical accuracy; not only on the graphics but on the story line of this pre-built scenarios on which the player can live Rome's defining moments, from The Battle of Zama which marked the final and decisive end of the Second Punic War to the rebellion of Marcus Antonius and Cleopatra.
- Custom Game: These feature is always present in modern-day real time tactic and strategy games, it can be used to practice against computer opponents on custom made scenarios or to go on-line and battle against other human players.

=== Civilizations ===
There are different civilizations to choose from, each with unique weakness and strengths: Egypt, Carthage, Republican Rome, Imperial Rome, Gallia, Germania, Hispania and Britannia.

=== Battles ===
Imperivm: Great Battles of Rome revives the battles which made Ancient Rome one of the great empire of the world, such as the Siege of Numantia, August victory against Mark Antony and Cleopatra in Egypt, Marcus Aurelius campaign against the Germans in the north of the Rhin river, Viriathus uprising in the West Iberian Peninsula and the Siege of Alesia led by Julius Caesar.

A special kind of unit called hero, which has become standard on real-time strategy and real-time tactic games, is used to group the different classes of soldiers under one command.

As a soldier builds up on experience he becomes more effective in combat.

By assaulting keeps a civilization can also gain access to loot like extra food or gold.

==== Heroes ====
Unlike normal military units, heroes are generally stronger and more valuable in battle. Their main strength lies in the ability to attach a group of up to 50 units, which from then on would follow their commands. When attached, the units receive part of the hero's experience as a bonus to their own. In addition, heroes arrange armies in specific formations that provide their units with an additional bonus when executing the stand ground command. Unlike units each hero has five skills that are unique to them and their civilization. These improve not only their individual combat abilities but also that of their army. Some of them are beneficial to the hero and the units attached to the hero. Other skills are beneficial to the units or help during battles.

==== Formations ====
There are four kind of formations in the game: Square, Block, Line and Center Cavalry. Each gives different bonus. Usually the maximum number of units on an army is limited to 50 but in the case of Republican Rome this cap can be pushed up to 70.

Also, different formations favors mixes on soldiers classes quantities. For example, choosing a line formation would benefit an army composed of a majority of ranged attackers.

By grouping two or more Generals the size of an army can be effectively increased. Orders can be issued simultaneously to each General who in turn would relay them to their troops. Conveniently once that the positions of the joined armies have been set, the computer will make the best effort to keep the defined distance between groups.

This feature gives more possibilities since this allows specialization of groups. Each can choose the more convenient formation, for instance, two armies, one composed only from ranged attackers and the other of a good mix of melee troops, can choose line and block respectively.

As a unit gets to see more action his skill level increases; every unit has a level to reflect this, thus it is possible to get a favorable outcome when facing a numerically superior enemy with battle hardened troops, the most appropriate formation and some maneuvering.

=== Buildings and population centers ===
There are several classes of populations centers.

==== Villages ====
These population centers produce food at a constant rate. Each one has a population limit and current living people, depending on the completeness of population the production rate decreases or increases, and the people can also be transferred to keeps or fortresses. Campaigning Troops can be supplied from these places, but is much more useful to use scorched earth tactics to avoid defending a counterattack if the village is at the end of the supply lines.

==== Walled City ====
The main establishment where the player recruits troops, make most of the basic training for them and upgrade certain abilities. Every walled city has a tavern, a coliseum, a blacksmith, a temple for the gods and a certain class of town center. What varies, according to the civilization, is what can be obtained on those buildings.

==== Keeps ====
These are smaller than the walled city but play an important role by gathering resources as extra money or soldiers. Among them are Gold Keep, Trading Keep and Training Keep.

The most obvious uses are as a forward base and defense point, keeps (no matter what class of keep) will attack any hostile nation party within certain range, but only when they have at least one occupant, the rate of fire can be increased by garrisoning more soldiers at the building but a line of supply must be established in order to keep alive the troops inside the fortification.

- Gold Keep: Gold keeps can be used to increase the gold income for a particular civilization. When a building of this class has 2000 gold coins, it will generate more money, and the player in possession of the keep can sent the surplus money to his walled city to aid in his war effort. By keeping an average population above 85% in the walled city and one Gold Keep a player can support two medium-sized armies to aid in the expansion of his empire.
- Trading Keep: These buildings are also useful to earn an extra income by means of selling food sent from a near village or walled city; the profits can be sent either to the walled city or be invested on a Gold Keep.
- Training Keep: These buildings are useful to raise the skill level of regular troops, generals or mercenaries. By storing food inside the building troops garrisoned inside will increase their level, though just to a certain level cap.
- Recruit Keep: In this building peasants are slowly turned into Level 1 Mace Warriors; these troops in turn can be sent to the training keep to raise their level. Food is also required for this transformation.

==== Ruins ====
These are used to increase the power of priest by performing rituals or they can contain powerful magic items that increase wielder's stats.

== Liga Imperivm ==
Liga Imperivm is the online version of the game where players can chat and fight one against others. There are different ranks, and from lowest to highest punctuation, it is formed by slave, liberto, plebeian, patrician, decurion, centurion, praefectus, tribune, legatus, aedile, priest, magistrate, senator, censor, quaestor, praetor, consul, proconsul, governor and emperor.

In 2005, it organized the first Liga Imperivm championship, where players faced in a 1vs1 or 2vs2 duel. The winner got a trophy and €5000.

== Reception ==
Great Battles of Rome received a "Double Platinum" award from the Asociación Española de Distribuidores y Editores de Software de Entretenimiento (aDeSe), for more than 160,000 sales in Spain during its first 12 months. By 2006 the game sold more than 1 million copies and became a Platinum title.

== The Great Battles of Rome Imperivm HD Edition ==
In 2018 a group of developers, supported by FX, begun to work on a beta version of the game, which is currently available through the platform Steam. The new game is known within its largest community of active gamers as Imperivm III HD. A series of constant updates allows the game to feature: improved graphics (HD), new decorative and functional elements of maps, bugs and lag removal, balance of troops, new buildings, new unites, auto-update, and new language available (English).

== Imperivm GBR: Greek Civilization MOD ==
In 2016 the Italian team RattlesMake released a fanmade expansion pack called Greek Civilization MOD, including all the changes from the Steam version (until patch 1.54) and the introduction of a new playable civilization: the Greeks. Version 1.0 was released in September 2017, and version 2.0 with additional features was released in February 2023. In September 2020 the team received a Cease and Desist letter from FX Interactive for copyright infringement, pressuring the team to immediately halt development and take down the project from mod hosting websites. Since 2022 however, the Mediterranevm Team has taken over the project and re-released the mod without copyrighted assets, further developing and releasing new updates and features.
