= Three Kingdoms: Fate of the Dragon =

2000 video game

- Developers: Overmax Studios, Object Software Limited
- Publisher: Eidos Interactive
- Platform: Microsoft Windows
- Release: CHN: December 21, 2000; EU: March 9, 2001; NA: March 13, 2001
- Genre: Real-time strategy
- Modes: Single player, multiplayer

Three Kingdoms: Fate of the Dragon (or simply Fate of the Dragon for short in the U.S. version) is a video game developed by Overmax Studios in 2000 for the PC. It is based on the historical background of the epic 14th century novel Romance of the Three Kingdoms by Luo Guanzhong. As one of the three Warlords of the Kingdoms, in 184 AD China, the player must build their own kingdom, develop new technologies and create mighty armies to conquer the other Warlords and ultimately take control of the Three Kingdoms and reunify China. Fate of the Dragon is a real-time strategy game very similar in format to that of the Age of Empires series, developed by Ensemble Studios, in which the user takes on the role of a character, namely Liu Bei, Sun Quan and Cao Cao from one of the Three Kingdoms and controls their kingdom through such means as pointing and clicking on certain parts of the map to decide what to do. The player is tasked with collecting various resources and building a standing army in order to protect their borders and defeat the other kingdoms in the game.

== Reception ==
Reception

Aggregate score
Aggregator	Score
Metacritic	71/100

Review scores
Publication	Score
AllGame	3/5
Computer Games Magazine	2/5
Computer Gaming World	2.5/5
Edge	6/10
EP Daily	8.5/10
Game Informer	6/10
GameSpot	7.4/10
GameSpy	88%
GameZone	8/10
IGN	8/10
Next Generation	3/5
PC Gamer (US)	59%

The game received "average" reviews according to the review aggregation website Metacritic. Lee Cummings of NextGen said of the game, "If you're a veteran RTS gamer looking for something new, this is certainly worth a look."

== See also ==
- Dynasty Warriors
- Romance of the Three Kingdoms
- Dragon Throne: Battle of Red Cliffs
- Metal Knight
