= Ancestors Legacy =

2018 video game

- Steam banner
- Developer: Destructive Creations
- Publishers: 1C Company (PC, XBO); Destructive Creations (PS4, NS)
- Director: Oskar Maleszko
- Composers: Adam Skorupa; Krzysztof Wierzynkiewicz
- Engine: Unreal Engine 4
- Platforms: Microsoft Windows; Xbox One; PlayStation 4 Nintendo Switch macOS
- Release: Microsoft Windows; May 22, 2018; PlayStation 4, Xbox One; August 13, 2019; Nintendo Switch; June 11, 2020; macOS; May 19, 2026
- Genre: Real-time strategy
- Modes: Single-player, multiplayer

Ancestors Legacy is a real-time strategy video game developed by Polish studio Destructive Creations and published by 1C Company. It was released on Microsoft Windows on May 22, 2018, Xbox One and PlayStation 4 on August 13, 2019, Nintendo Switch on June 11, 2020and macOS was released through Steam & App Store on May 19, 2026

== Gameplay ==
Ancestors Legacy offers two game modes: a single-player campaign scenario or a multiplayer game, in which the player can choose to play one of four civilizations: Vikings, Anglo-Saxons, Teutons, or Slavs (the Saladin's Conquest DLC adds a fifth civilization, the Saracens). The game features a day/night cycle which changes the way factions play.

=== Single-player ===
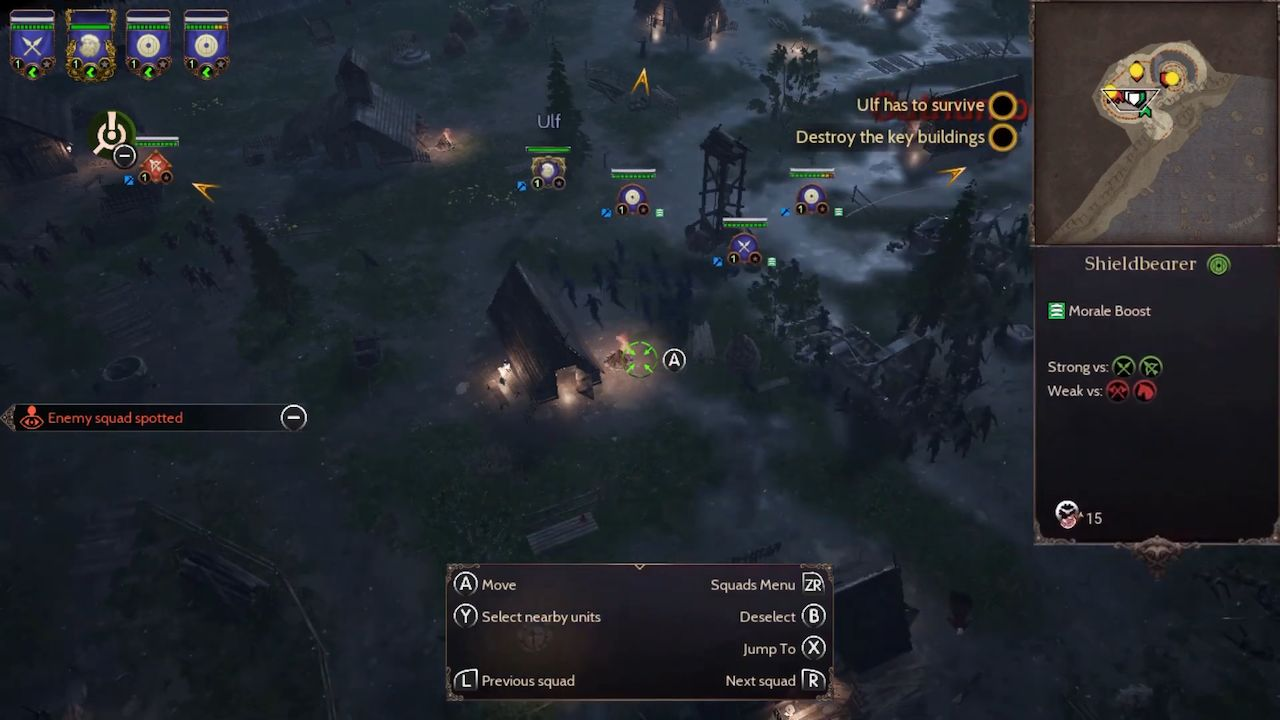
Gameplay screenshot

The game features one or two campaign scenarios for each civilization. The Anglo-Saxon campaign features the likes of Edward the Confessor, William the Conqueror and the Earl of Huntingdon. For the Vikings campaign the game is set in 793 and is divided into two parts. The first part is set during the raid of Lindisfarne's monastery, an event which is sometimes considered the beginning of the Viking Age and which serves as a tutorial. Once the tutorial is completed the other campaigns become available. The second part is set in 892 and is dedicated to Rurik, a Varangian chieftain during the Ladoga campaign. The Slavs and Teutons have one campaign each. During the campaigns, the AI is a better player as it is able to replace losses and send large armies to your base.

=== Multiplayer ===
The multiplayer aspect of the game provides Domination and Annihilation modes, during which a player can have as many as 10 squads. Multiplayer battles can take place on any of 15 maps, prepared for 2, 4 or 6 players (1v1, 2v2 or 3v3).

== Development ==
Ancestors Legacy's development was announced on May 10, 2017. It entered open beta on February 5, 2018. A single player preview beta build was released during Gamescom on September 3, 2017. Initially, the Xbox One and Windows versions were supposed to come out on the same day (May 22), but the Xbox and PlayStation 4 versions were released on August 13, 2019. It was released for Nintendo Switch on June 11, 2020. Publisher GameClub ported Ancestors Legacy to iOS devices under the title Ancestors Legacy: Vikings on March 9, 2021. It includes just the Vikings portion of the original PC version.

=== Updates ===
In September 2018, Destructive Creations added a second Slav campaign where the player can lead Bolesław I the Brave of Poland and his son Mieszko II.

In December 2018, Destructive Creations announced the release of a free-to-download campaign called Ancestors Legacy: History of the Teutonic Order. The campaign, which is made out of five story missions, is divided in two parts. The first part will tell the story of Herkus Monte and his rebellion against the Teutonic Order during the Great Prussian Uprising. The second part of the campaign is dedicated to the Commander of the Teutonic Order Konrad von Thierberg and the siege of rebel bastion, the Lidzbark (Lautenburg) Castle. All of the new content is set in the 13th century.

In May 2019, Destructive Creations released a paid DLC titled Ancestors Legacy: Saladin's Conquest. The DLC contains a new nation of Saracens and mainly a brand new campaign, but this time Ancestors Legacy leaves the European soil and tells a completely different story from the perspective of Saladin, the first sultan of Egypt and Syria. It contains five new missions, 3 new multiplayer maps and new achievements.

== Reception ==
Reception

Aggregate score
Aggregator	Score
Metacritic	77%

Review score
Publication	Score
IGN	7.7/10

Ancestors Legacy received generall positive reviews, holding a score of 77% on Metacritic.

IGN had said that despite some historical inaccuracies and some tactical issues, the game was traditional in the RTS form. Lennart Bachmann of Big Boss Battle criticized its troop and terrain variety as well as mundane base construction, but recommended the game itself.
