= Nemesis of the Roman Empire =

2003 video game

- Developer: Haemimont Games
- Publishers: Enlight Software; FX Interactive
- Platform: Microsoft Windows
- Release: SP: November 27, 2003; NA: March 26, 2004; EU: 2004
- Genres: Real-time strategy, role-playing
- Mode: Single-player

Nemesis of the Roman Empire (Bulgarian: Картаген) is a real-time strategy role-playing video game developed by Haemimont Games and published by Enlight Software. The sequel to Celtic Kings: Rage of War, the game is set in the Punic Wars and allows the player to take control of one of four nations, as well as Hannibal the Great.

In Spain the game was released on November 27, 2003 under the title Imperivm II: Conquest of Hispania, and in Italy as Imperivm II: The Punic Wars, by the publisher FX Interactive.

== Gameplay ==
Nemesis of the Roman Empire is a real-time strategy role-playing game. Set during the Punic Wars, the player can take control of one of four nations: the Romans, the Gauls, the Carthaginians, and the Iberians.

Seeing the power and influence of Carthage, Roman legions were sent to Africa with orders to attack the rival city of Carthage, led by its general Hannibal.

== Development ==
Nemesis of the Roman Empire was developed by Haemimont Games, and was released in November 2003 in Spain. The game is a sequel to Celtic Kings: Rage of War, originally titled Celtic Kings: The Punic Wars. Enlight Software published and distributed the game in North America in March 2004.

== Reception ==
Reception

Aggregate score
Aggregator	Score
Metacritic	74/100

Review scores
Publication	Score
Computer Games Magazine	2.5/5
Computer Gaming World	2.5/5
Game Informer	7.75/10
GameSpot	8/10
GameSpy	4.5/5
GameZone	8/10
IGN	8/10
PC Gamer (US)	68%
PC Zone	64%

Nemesis of the Roman Empire received "average" reviews according to the review aggregation website Metacritic. The game earned "Platinum" award from the Asociación Española de Distribuidores y Editores de Software de Entretenimiento (aDeSe), for more than 80,000 sales in Spain during its first 12 months. It ultimately sold above 250,000 units in Spain.
