= War Diary (video game) =

War Diary Choongmoogong I 워 다이어리, 충무공전 I
- European cover art
- Developer(s): Trigger Soft; HQ Team
- Publisher(s): Orange Soft; The Game Factory; CDV Software
- Designer(s): Tae Gon Kim; Moon-Kue Kim; Mu-sik Jung
- Engine: Custom
- Platform(s): MS-DOS, Windows
- Release: NA/KR: 1997; EU/JP: 1998
- Genre(s): Real-time strategy
- Mode(s): Single-player

Choongmoogong (Korean: 충무공전 : 난중일기편, 亂中日記편) (retitled War Diary in Europe and the US) was the second video game released in 1996 by Trigger Soft Corporation (Korean:(주)트리거소프트), developed in cooperation with independent developer HQ Team led by Tae Gon Kim. It is based upon Yi Sun-shin's War Diary, Nanjung Ilgi. War Diary was one of the first real-time strategy games based upon Korea's military history.

== Plot ==
War Diary is a real-time strategy game based on actual events that took place toward the end of the 16th century. Toyotomi Hideyoshi, through conquest, had united Japan for the first time. A brilliant strategist, his appetite for power was not satisfied; next, Hideyoshi requested that Korea allow passage of his troops on their way to invade China. Korea refused, and in 1592 Hideyoshi landed between 150,000 and 200,000 troops on Korean shores. The Japanese possessed a weapon the Koreans had not encountered before: arquebuses (Japanese: Teppō 鉄砲 Lit."Iron cannon") . The Japanese advanced quickly, seizing the capital of Seoul within two weeks. And it is into this scenario that the player comes in as a Korean general, to crush this invading army in a series of campaigns.

== Gameplay ==
There are a number of actions which are necessary to take in order for the player to succeed at War Diary.
First, the player must build and manage military bases (excepting stage 11), which consist of a variety of structures. A Barracks (Korean:훈련도감) will allow the player to create Peasant (Korean:농부) and Fighter (Korean:병졸) units, and will also permit him to arm his troops with any weapons that are currently available. The Arms Works (Korean:무기제작소) lets the player create weapons for his armies, up to a maximum of six different sword, arrow (Korean:목궁), powerful cannons and ballista (Korean:화차) types. A Shipyard (Korean:조선소) will produce Transport Rafts (Korean:판옥선) and Battleships (Korean:거북선), and a Temple (Korean:절) creates Priests (Korean:승병) that are equipped with magical powers. A Blacksmith will produce units of iron, and a Guard Tower (Korean:망루) will fire arrows and projectiles at invading enemy troops. Other structures such as a Tool Works (Korean:도구제작소), Heavy Arms Works (Korean:중기제작소) and Stables (Korean:가축우리) are also available to create other types of offensive and/or defensive weaponry.

Second, the player must obtain resources in order to be able to build the structures mentioned above. Each structure has a cost in terms of money (Korean:돈), trees (Korean:나무,목재) and iron (Korean:철). Iron can be produced with a Blacksmith, trees can be felled by Peasants, and money is raised by selling other resources. Food (Korean:식량) is another resource which must either be cropped from farmland (Korean:농지) or purchased in trade.

Third, manpower must be created in the form of Peasants and Troops. Peasants are the player's workforce, and are used to harvest the crops, chop down trees, and smelt the iron on a Blacksmith. Troops are created to be the player's fighting force, and the basic troop can be armed with previously built weaponry to increase the damage that troop unit can inflict upon the enemy. Eventually, a defensive shield, health-repairing ginseng (Korean:인삼), speed-increasing Suhwaja walking boots (Korean:수화자) and a dagger (Korean:비수) which increases offensive and defensive capabilities can be created, and the player's Troops can be armed with these items to alter the unit's original capabilities.

Gameplay is accomplished by waging a campaign which is broken up into 12 different stages. Each stage has its own goals which must be accomplished in order for the player to advance to the next stage. There are new items available to be built in each stage, and the goals and new items for each stage are described in the manual as well as printed on the screen when the player begins the stage.

In addition to managing the troops, military bases and resources, the weather and time of day are additional elements to be considered. A weather vane is displayed on the main game screen, indicating the wind direction. Rain and thunderstorms can also affect the player's troops. A clock is also displayed which will help the player to determine the time of day, as it may be more advantageous to launch a nighttime raid as opposed to engaging in a full-frontal attack in daytime hours.

== Stages ==
Made by Tae Gon Kim, the first eight levels stages take places during the Japanese invasions of Korea (Korean: 임진왜란)

- Stage 1 is related to the fictive battle of Mungyeong Saejae and takes place on 7 June 1592
- Stage 2 takes place in Ganghwa Island on 9 June 1592.
- Stage 3 takes place in Hwa Island near Hansan Island between 16 and 27 June 1592.
- Stage 4 takes place in Jinju Castle between 7–13 November 1592 and is related to the Siege of Jinju
- Stage 5 takes place near Hanyang (modern-day Seoul) on 27 February 1593 and is possibly related to the Battle of Byeokjegwan
- Stage 6 takes place in Hanyang suburbs on 19 May 1593.
- Stage 7 takes place in 1594 and is possibly related to the second battle of Danghangpo.
- Stage 8 takes place on 27 August 1597 and is possibly related to the Battle of Chilcheollyang

The last four levels are related to Japanese invasion of Korea because both Hideyoshi and Admiral Lee were dead in 1598.

== Legacy ==
War Diary led to a direct sequel: Trigger Soft Corporation released a semi-remake for Windows 95/98 in 1999 as War Diary II (Korean: 충무공전 II : 난세 영웅전). HQ Team started its own series around the Hideyoshi invasions, called Seven Years' War (Korean title: Imjinnok 임진록)
