= Curtiss-Wright CW-3 Duckling =

CW-3 Duckling

General information
- Type: Two-seat amphibious flying-boat
- Manufacturer: Curtiss-Wright
- Number built: 3

History
- First flight: 1931
- Developed from: CW-1 Junior

The Curtiss-Wright CW-3 Duckling (sometimes called the Teal) was an American two-seat amphibious flying-boat developed by Curtiss-Wright from the CW-1 Junior.

== Development ==
The Duckling was a modification of the CW-1 Junior. The fuselage had a plywood V-shaped underside added and the addition of strut-mounted pontoons. The engine was mounted above the wing driving a pusher propeller. Only three aircraft were built, all powered by different engines. The type was not developed due to lack of funds.

== Variants ==
CW-3
Prototype powered by a 90hp (67kW) Velie M-5 radial engine, one built.
CW-3L
Variant powered by a 90hp (67kW) Lambert radial engine, one built.
CW-3W
Variant powered by a 90hp (67kW) Warner Scarab radial engine, one built.

== Specifications (CL-3W) ==
Data from

General characteristics

- Crew: two
- Length: 21 ft 3 in (6.48 m)
- Wingspan: 39 ft 6 in (12.04 m)
- Powerplant: 1 × Warner Scarab radial piston engine, 90 hp (67 kW)

== See also ==
Related lists

- List of flying boats and floatplanes
