= Mazes of Fate =

2006 video game

- Developer: Sabarasa
- Publishers: NA: O~3 Entertainment (GBA) Graffiti Entertainment (DS); EU: Neko Entertainment
- Designer: Javier Otaegui
- Platforms: Game Boy Advance; Nintendo DS
- Release: Game Boy Advance: NA: December 12, 2006; Nintendo DS: EU: July 25, 2008; NA: September 9, 2008
- Genre: Role-playing
- Mode: Single-player

Mazes of Fate is a first-person role-playing video game developed by Argentinian studio Sabarasa and published by Graffiti Entertainment for the Game Boy Advance and the Nintendo DS. The Game Boy Advance version was released in North America on December 12, 2006.

A reconversion, titled Mazes of Fate DS, was released for the Nintendo DS on July 25, 2008, in Europe and on September 9, 2008, in North America. It improved on the original by fixing bugs present in the original, introducing a 3D engine in dungeons as a replacement of fake-3D, adding new secret areas in dungeons, and including new dungeon maps. A major bug in the DS port removed the challenge of combat by making nearly all enemies killable before they can approach the player and start counterattacking.

The game's Game Boy Advance release received mixed-to-positive reviews, whilst the DS re-release was looked upon more unfavourably.

== Plot ==
The dark fantasy world where the story is set is soon to be facing divine punishment. The ancient gods, disgusted by humanity's pride, intend to wipe mankind out and replace it with a new, more submissive race of goatmen, but this plan is not unavoidable. One party of adventurers take it upon themselves to fight back "against overwhelming odds" so that humanity is not sentenced to a fate "that may be worse than death."

Traveling with the protagonist are potentially six allies, who gradually get recruited, or ask to join the adventurers.

== Gameplay ==
Mazes of Fate is a real-time first-person role-playing game in which the player takes controls of up to three characters. It bears similarities to older games in its genre, including Eye of the Beholder. When the player starts the game, he or she can either choose from three different pre-generated characters - a Warrior, a Rogue, and a Mage - or create a custom character. The Warrior's abilities are tilted towards power, the Rogue's abilities are tilted towards speed and thief-related abilities, and the Mage's abilities are tilted towards magic and spells. In the DS version of the game, the number of pre-generated characters player may choose from is increased to seven. In addition to the original three characters, he or she can also play as a Priest, an Assassin (an agile warrior using mostly daggers and knives), a Valkyrie (a different type of warrior specializing in two-handed and ranged weapons), or as an alternative type of Warrior specializing in two-handed weapons.
The game has three different types of areas the player can explore - dungeons, the overworld, and civilized locations such as towns and villages. The dungeons are the primary area where battles are fought, the overworld is a hub which leads to dungeons and civilized locations, and civilized locations often act to advance the story and purchase and sell items.

== Development ==
Mazes of Fate was developed by Argentinean developer Sabarasa for the Game Boy Advance and directed by Javier Otaegui. The development team consisted of approximately 15 people as well as some external workers assisting. Development began in 2003, taking approximately 2 1/2 years to finish. The GBA was chosen for Mazes of Fate because of it being comparatively easier to make games on. Otaegui took inspiration from multiple role-playing games, including Chrono Trigger, Fallout, and Eye of the Beholder. The visual design of the game is a combination of Japanese anime and South American art styles. He stated that the choice of making a first-person role-playing game on the GBA was due to a lack of quality attempts on the platform. The developer experienced issues during development due to them being relatively new to game development and their region's lack of console game development history. The game's publisher, Graffiti Entertainment, assisted in development.

== Reception ==
Reception

Aggregate score
Aggregator	Score	
Aggregator	DS	GBA
Metacritic	49/100	65/100

Review scores
Publication	Score	
Publication	DS	GBA
GameSpot	N/A	6.6/10
GameZone	N/A	7.8/10
IGN	4/10	6.5/10
Nintendo World Report	N/A	6.5/10

The Game Boy Advance version received "mixed" reviews, earning an average score of 65 out of 100, while the DS version received "generally unfavorable reviews", earning a score of 49 out of 100 according to video game review aggregator Metacritic.

Reviewing the Game Boy Advance version for IGN, Jack Devries called it "the very definition of old school", praising its "engrossing", yet "hard to follow" story and the variety and scale of content, though noted the visuals as "dated" and criticized the audio as having "some of the worst sound effects on the system", giving the game a 6.5 out of 10.

The DS version received generally lower scores; for IGN, Devries also reviewed its port, criticizing the game heavily for its AI being so much worse that "the game lost all of its challenge", panning the updated graphics, and ultimately stated that the developers "butchered their own game and completely ruined it", giving the game a 4 out of 10.
