= Corsairs: Conquest at Sea =

1999 video game

- Developer: Microïds
- Publisher: Microïds
- Platform: Microsoft Windows
- Release: EU: 1999; NA: April 30, 1999
- Genre: Strategy
- Mode: Single player

Corsairs: Conquest at Sea is a 1999 strategy/action/adventure game for the PC, developed and published by Microïds (known for Syberia and its continuation Syberia II). The game is a simulation of the life of a privateer employed by either England, France, the Netherlands or Spain in, most likely, the 17th century. The player can take part in either the campaign, which consists of several scenarios with a specific goal, or adventure mode, where the goal is simply to capture all the ports on the map for their nation.

== Reception ==
Reception

Aggregate score
Aggregator	Score
GameRankings	59%

Review scores
Publication	Score
AllGame	3.5/5
Computer Games Strategy Plus	3.5/5
Computer Gaming World	2/5
EP Daily	5/10
GameSpot	5.9/10
Jeuxvideo.com	17/20
Next Generation	1/5
PC Accelerator	4/10
PC Gamer (US)	82%
PC Zone	59%

Corsairs generally received mixed reviews according to the review aggregation website GameRankings. It was often deemed as being buggy and having outdated sound and graphics, but praised for having a decent storyline and being creative. Adam Pavlacka of NextGen said of the game, "If a little more work had gone into polishing the gameplay, this could have been a real gem. As it is, it's a lump of coal."
