= Arena Wars =

2004 video game

- Developer: exDream
- Publishers: Ascaron Entertainment, Tri Synergy
- Platform: Microsoft Windows
- Release: GER: July 16, 2004; UK: September 10, 2004; NA: September 21, 2004; FRA: October 8, 2004
- Genres: Action, real-time strategy

Arena Wars is an action and real-time strategy game released by Tri Synergy and Ascaron Entertainment in 2004.

== Gameplay ==
The game is notable for combining strategy and shooter elements in gameplay. The limited unit choices (6) and specials (one for each unit) make the game extremely balanced. There are no resources needed to build units, as every player has exactly 1000 credits. Building units uses credits, but a player that loses a unit regains the money instantly and can rebuild it (or another unit), penalized only by the time taken to rebuild. Players also do not construct buildings, but use buildings located at fixed positions on the map. Players win the game by completing one of three objectives, depending on the game type:

- Capture the Flag - stealing the flag from an opposing base
- Bombing Run - carrying a bomb into an opposing base
- Double Domination - controlling "domination zones" for a period of time

As opposing players have equal options, high-level strategy, fast decision making, and precise micromanagement are key factors for success.

== Development ==
Arena Wars was the first commercial game to utilize the .NET Framework; however, it used a managed OpenGL wrapper rather than the XNA Framework/Direct3D API.

== Remake ==
Arena Wars Reloaded, developed br exDream and published by Ascaron Entertainment, was released on June 22, 2007 for PC and combines elements of real-time strategy and action elements, like its predecessor. The game carries many of the original overall game structure with improvements in graphics and a more stable game engine.

== Reception ==
Reception

Aggregate score
| Aggregator | Score |
|---|---|
| Metacritic | 77/100 |

Review scores
| Publication | Score |
|---|---|
| 1Up.com | B |
| Computer Gaming World | 4/5 |
| GamesMaster | 58% |
| GameSpot | 7.5/10 |
| GameSpy | 3.5/5 |
| GameZone | 8.4/10 |
| Jeuxvideo.com | 14/20 |
| PC Format | 78% |
| PC Gamer (US) | 76% |
| PC Zone | 68% |

The game received "generally favorable reviews" according to the review aggregation website Metacritic.
