= Iron Marines =

2017 video game

- Developer: Ironhide Game Studio
- Platforms: Windows; Linux; OSX; iOS; Android
- Release: Android, iOS; September 14, 2017; Windows, Linux, macOS; May 16, 2019; Apple Arcade; April 10, 2023
- Genre: Real-time strategy
- Mode: Single-player

Iron Marines is a 2017 real-time strategy video game developed by Ironhide Game Studio. It was released on September 14, 2017, for iOS and Android, and for Windows, Linux and mac OS X via Steam on May 16, 2019. In the game, players act as the commander of the Iron Marines, a military group tasked with saving a space colony from extraterrestrial invaders. To fight off the invaders, the player is given control of a powerful "hero" unit which they must use to complete a variety of missions. In addition to the hero unit, the player is given control of a number of other units such as mechs and soldiers. The game was well received by critics on release.

== Gameplay ==
Iron Marines is a real-time strategy (RTS) video game that takes inspiration from StarCraft. In the game, players act as the commander of the Iron Marines, a military group tasked with saving a space colony from extraterrestrial invaders. To fight off the invaders, the player is given control of a powerful hero unit that features its own distinct abilities in combat and can be leveled up. The player is also given control of a number of different troops such as mechs, soldiers, and aliens. Levels involve a number of objectives, such as defending military bases from attack, and searching for and destroying enemy armies. The player constantly gains resources throughout combat, which they can use to recruit more troops and build powerful defensive buildings at set points around the level.

== Reception ==
Reception

Aggregate score
Aggregator	Score
Metacritic	iOS: 90/100

Review scores
Publication	Score
IGN	NR
Pocket Gamer	4.5/5

According to the review aggregate website Metacritic, Iron Marines received "universal acclaim" for its iOS version. Pocket Gamer found the game to be a competent RTS game for mobile devices that felt reminiscient of tower defense games. The reviewer said that Iron Marines did not have the complexity of other games in the genre, but kept the basic concept and managed to include several distinct twists. Gamezebo liked the game's interface and said that it would become challenging very quickly. The reviewer called the graphics and soundtrack familiar to Ironhide Game Studio's earlier games, saying that the graphics helped keep the game from feeling dark and bleak.
