= Just Another War in Space =

1991 video game

- Publisher: Azeroth Publishing
- Programmer: Bob Parkin
- Platform: Atari ST
- Release: 1991
- Genre: Computer wargame

Just Another War in Space is a 1991 computer wargame published by Azeroth Publishing for the Atari ST. It was written by Bob Parkin.

== Gameplay ==
Just Another War in Space is a one-player strategic tactical game of space combat, in which the player can either ally with the Empire or the Federation.

== Reception ==
Hosea Battles, Jr. reviewed the game for Computer Gaming World, and stated that "this is an excellent tactical level combat game with a few strategic decisions (sort of an "opposite twin brother" to Star Control). It will appeal to those who like strategic wargaming with plenty of on-screen action."

Greg Knauss for STart said that "With a GEM front-end, I would easily recommend it to anyone looking for detailed space combat, but as it is, only the dedicated are likely to want to take the time."
