= Battle Storm =

1991 video game

- Developer: Bullet Proof Software
- Publisher: Yonezawa PR21
- Designers: Akira Kobayahi; Hans Janssen; Takahiro Koseki
- Composers: Haruko Suzuki, Hiroshi Suzuki
- Platform: Family Computer
- Release: JP: December 21, 1991
- Genres: Action; Strategy
- Modes: Single-player; Multiplayer

Battle Storm (バトルストーム; "Battle Storm") is a Family Computer video game that was published by Yonezawa PR21 and released on December 21, 1991. An unofficial English translation patch for Battle Storm was released on October 23, 2015.

== Gameplay ==

The game allows players to do combat strategies with tanks, airplanes, military bases, and non-nuclear missiles. These advanced weapons allow players to stage a fictional World War III and to simulate modern warfare.

Players can assume the persona of various Hollywood action film stars like Sylvester Stallone (シルヴェスター・スタローン), Chuck Norris (チャックノリス), Eddie Murphy (エディマーフィー), Bruce Lee (ブルースリー), and Arnold Schwarzenegger (アーノルドシュワルツェネッガー). Stages include a jungle, forest, swamp, and urban terrain.

The player chooses a tank, and then must decide either to move a unit or destroy the enemy on sight. Destroyed units can be rebuilt for money and the first person to run out of cash loses the war. Both players are granted more than $250 million of virtual game currency to spend on military weapons to fire at each other.
