= Infested Planet =

2014 video game

- Steam header
- Developer: Rocket Bear Games
- Publisher: Rocket Bear Games
- Designer: Alex Vostrov
- Programmer: Alex Vostrov
- Composers: Jim Rota; Roman Zakharov; Mark Wiebe
- Platforms: Windows; OS X
- Release: March 6, 2014
- Genre: Real-time strategy
- Mode: Single-player

Infested Planet is a real-time strategy video game developed and published by Rocket Bear Games.

== Gameplay ==
Players control a group of four mercenaries. They are tasked with clearing tens of thousands of hostile insectoid creatures from an alien planet. These enemies randomly gain different special abilities, which forces players to adapt. To counter this, players can re-outfit their characters at will. On the highest difficulty levels and the endgame level, enemies dynamically adapt to the player's strategies, so if players frequently use flame throwers, new enemies with longer-range attacks or knockback effects may appear. To defend land that they've captured, players can set automated defenses, which introduce a tower defense mechanic.

== Development ==
Alex Vostrov made Infested Planet mostly by himself. Vostrov was inspired by Red Alert 2 and his frustrations with other real-time strategy games, which he found were often easily won by patiently out-building the computer players. Vostrov wanted to design a game where opponents would rush the player. Infested Planet is Vostrov's first release after he became a full-time game developer. It left early access on March 6, 2014.

== Reception ==
Reception

Aggregate score
Aggregator	Score
Metacritic	75/100

Review scores
Publication	Score
GameSpot	8/10
PCGamesN	7/10

Infested Planet received positive reviews on Metacritic. Graham Smith of Rock Paper Shotgun described it as a Starship Troopers-inspired video game that successfully mimics the film. He said the gameplay is a "mash-up of shooter and RTS" that can satisfy fans of both genres, but he found the game's relentlessness frustrating. GameSpot's reviewer, Nathan Meunier, wrote that the game's "well-balanced and absorbing gameplay" overcomes the stereotypical plot. He said that it is "brutally tough at moments but always fair". At PCGamesN, Julian Benson called Infested Planet "the most subversive game of 2014", introducing constant stalemates and challenges that need to be overcome in different ways.
