= Real War =

2001 video game

- Developers: Rival Interactive, Semi Logic Entertainments
- Publisher: Simon & Schuster Interactive
- Platform: Microsoft Windows
- Release: August 2001

Real War is a 2001 real-time strategy video game and series of the same name developed by Rival Interactive and published by Simon & Schuster Interactive.

In-game briefing voices were provided by R. Lee Ermey.

== Gameplay ==
Real War is a real-time strategy game. The player controls either the United States or the fictional Independent Liberation Army terrorist group. In each game of Real War, players start with a headquarters building, then construct buildings such as power generators and command centers to produce units. Infantry forces, tanks, aircraft including planes, helicopters, and stealth bombers, and naval units including carriers, destroyers, and submarines can be built, though all are identified by those generic names. Victory conditions vary by game mode, being last-man standing in multiplayer skirmish modes, but varied in the single-player campaigns.

Unlike other real-time strategy games, Real War minimizes economic micromanagement, as the player automatically gains supplies that are used to build units. In addition, it focuses on a combined arms approach by limiting the number of units of certain types players can produce.

== Development ==
Real War had its origins in Joint Forces Employment, a game that was developed by OC Incorporated for the United States military, and used for training across several United States military academies. Joint Forces Employment was released on May 17, 2000 exclusively for the United States military, and was, apart from differences in interface and unit statistics for balancing, virtually identical to the Real War games eventually released for the civilian market.

Real War was announced in January 2001. It was developed by Rival Interactive, a company based in Alexandria, Virginia; and Semi Logic Entertainments, a company based in California. Rival Interactive partnered with OC Incorporated to develop Real War.

== Reception ==
Reception

Aggregate score
Aggregator	Score
Metacritic	48/100

Review scores
Publication	Score
IGN	4.8/10
GameSpy	54%
GameZone	7/10
Computer Gaming World	2/5
Computer Games Magazine	2/5

The game holds a rating of 48 of 100 on review aggregator Metacritic.

GameSpy gave the game a score of 54% out of 100, stating "Real War is a dud of an RTS, with a few minor strengths buried under a mountain of problems".

The game sold 300,000 copies. In Spain, the 2001 Real War game received a "Gold" prize from the Asociación Española de Distribuidores y Editores de Software de Entretenimiento, for 40,000 sales in the country during its first year.

== Sequel ==
A sequel, Real War: Rogue States, was published in 2002.
