= Paranoia (video game) =

Czech conquest science fiction video game

Paranoia!
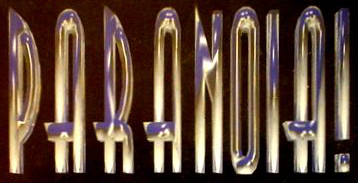
- Box cover logo
- Developer(s): Phoenix Arts
- Publisher(s): Vision; MEC
- Platform(s): MS-DOS
- Release: NA: September 1995
- Genre(s): Real-time strategy
- Mode(s): Single-player, multiplayer

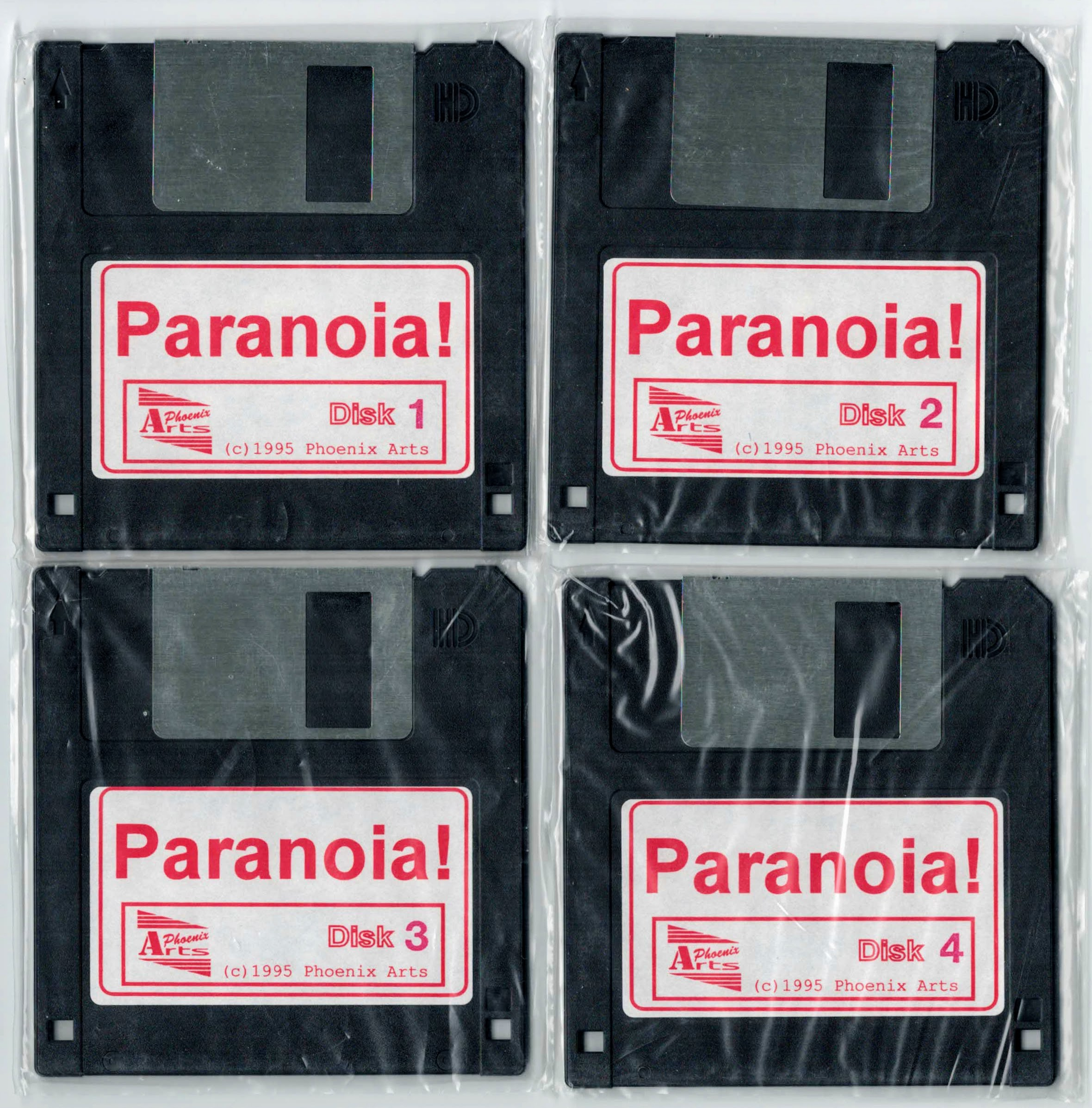
Original diskettes

Paranoia! (or Paranoia) is a Czech conquest science fiction video game and a clone of Dune II. It was developed by Phoenix Arts in 1995 and distributed by Vision and later by MEC. It is the first Czech RTS. A sequel, Paranoia II, was released the following year.

== Plot ==
The game's story is set in 2673 in the Beretta solar system on the planet Paranoia, where the Aponid war has continued for four years. The war began over one of the barren planet's few plants, the hopsinka, which has special powers. The player commands the Terrans, the native population, and strives to reclaim their territories.

== Development ==
Paranoia was conceived as a project by Radek Ševčík. Ševčík wanted to make a better clone of Dune II as he didn't like some aspects of the game. Ševčík joined the Phoenix Arts team and started to work on the game. It was originally intended to be a freeware project, but as the costs rose, the developers decided to release Paranoia as a commercial product. Paranoia was finished in February 1995, but developers decided to delay the release because they weren't satisfied with the game yet and continued to add new functions through the rest of development. The game was released in September 1995 after one year of development. Phoenix Arts released Paranoia II in 1996.

== Legacy ==
=== Shrot ===
After releasing the retro shooter, Hrot, developer Spytihněv built and released a new real-time strategy game called Shrot on June 20, 2024. It is a tribute to an old, 1995 Czech RTS called Paranoia!, and mimics the retro 2D visual appearance of that game and its inspiration, Dune II. But it is more action packed.

==== Story ====
The game's plot is about the discovery of a virgin planet called Scheeza, which has the valuable resource, wild hops. However, three rival space factions rushed to compete for the resource on the planet.

==== Gameplay ====
The game produces procedurally generated battles for the player; and includes base building, hop mining, local networking, and localisations in English and Czech. All three story-based factions are playable.
