= Dragon Throne: Battle of Red Cliffs =

2002 real-time strategy video game

- Developer(s): Object Software Limited
- Publisher(s): Strategy First
- Platform(s): Microsoft Windows
- Release: March 26, 2002
- Genre(s): Real-time strategy
- Mode(s): Single-player, multiplayer

Dragon Throne: Battle of Red Cliffs is a real-time strategy (RTS) video game developed by Object Software Limited (formerly known as Overmax Studios) in 2002 for the PC. It is based on the historical background of the epic 14th century novel Romance of the Three Kingdoms by Luo Guanzhong and the famous Battle of Red Cliffs (Battle of Chibi).

== See also ==
- Three Kingdoms: Fate of the Dragon
