= They Are Billions =

- Developer: Numantian Games
- Publishers: Numantian Games; BlitWorks (PS4, XONE)
- Platforms: Microsoft Windows; PlayStation 4 Xbox One; Nintendo Switch
- Release: December 13, 2017 (Steam Early Access); June 18, 2019 (full release); July 1, 2019 (PS4, XONE)
- Genres: Real-time strategy, survival
- Mode: Single-player

They Are Billions is a post-apocalyptic steampunk real-time strategy survival video game developed and published by Numantian Games. Available on Microsoft Windows, it was released onto Steam's Early Access program with a survival mode in December 2017. The game was released with a campaign titled "New Empire" on June 18, 2019. PlayStation 4 and Xbox One versions were published by BlitWorks on July 1, 2019.

== Gameplay ==
They Are Billions pits the player in a randomly generated steampunk themed, zombie-infested world. The player's goal is to build a base to protect themselves, by planning the layout and defenses, exploring the map, collecting resources and expanding while fighting the local zombie population at the same time. Infected villages, called Villages of Doom, can be pillaged for resources, although a backlash of zombie swarms can result. There are eight resources that the player must manage: gold, food, workers, wood, stone, iron, oil, and energy. Structures and units, many of different variations and following a tech-tree, will require different materials to be made. Zombies will attack the player's base at random intervals in small numbers, and larger hordes will appear at set times over the course of gameplay, culminating in a very large "final horde". The player must keep zombies from breaching base defenses and infecting non-defensive structures, especially in tight or overdeveloped areas where a domino effect outbreak can occur. Much like the player has access to different unit types, zombie types are also varied, ranging between slow, decrepit ones, extremely fast zombies called "Harpies", highly-resistant ones known as "Chubbies" and others, including a massive "Infected Giant" that has high health, speed, and damage that is also highlighted on a minimap, requiring the player to not only have a strong defensive perimeter (with walls, turrets, towers and traps), but also adapt tactics accordingly. While it is a real-time strategy game, players can pause at any time in order to plan future actions and give simultaneous orders.

== Plot ==
In late 22nd century North America, a world-wide rabies-like pandemic caused by a mutated strain of rabies called Rabies Z has triggered a zombie apocalypse, especially in the world's megacities. While initially the survivors attempted to establish villages and even fortresses to stave off the zombie hordes, eventually these fall with their technology failing them. However, a few thousand humans survive, united under the leadership of General-turned-Emperor Quintus Crane, and build and shelter themselves in Empire City, built within a crater that the zombies cannot reach. The apocalypse, on the other hand, has caused a severe technological regression.

The campaign begins 13 years after Crane announced his intent to expand beyond the crater and create a new human empire. The player is a colony administrator and military commander under Crane, who aspires to conquer new territory and build well-managed fortified colonies, all connected by a railway network. Across the campaign, which extends from the northern Western Seaboard to the fallen megacity of Mega York (former New York City), the player builds a personal army composed of mercenaries, renegades, and convicted criminals to handle the zombie swarms.

Meanwhile, with the aid of one of two special operatives, Caelus and Calliope, the player recovers lost technology to restore technological advancement back to pre-apocalypse time and gradually learns about the origins of the infection. The virus was the byproduct of an attempt by the world's leading scientists to use recycled meat from deceased people in an attempt to stave off an ever-increasing feeding crisis brought by overpopulation. The resulting infection - which also provoked mutations such as never-ending adrenal surges and overgrowth - and irresponsible worldwide distribution resulted in a pandemic that the world's governments failed to control. An experimental vaccine to cure the virus, V9, resulted in the creation of a special zombie type called Harpies. Abandoning any attempt to find the cure, scientists turned to create bio-engineered soldiers called Mutants armed with sharpened claws to fight off the zombie hordes. The campaign ends in Mega York with the player conquering the collapsed Statue of Liberty - now named the Goddess of Destiny - earning Crane's respect and securing the Empire's dominance across North America. Crane then reminds the Player that there will be more conquests in the future.

== Development ==
They Are Billions was announced by Numantian Games on May 30, 2017. It was released on December 13, 2017 on Steam's Early Access program with survival mode. The game quickly rose to the top selling charts on both Steam and the Humble Bundle storefront.

== Reception ==
Reception

Aggregate score
Aggregator	Score
Metacritic	PC: 77/100; PS4: 72/100; XONE: 73/100

The PC version of They Are Billions has 77/100 on Metacritic. David Wildgoose, writing for Gamessport, referred to the game as "[...] a tight and compelling strategy game".

=== Sales ===
The PlayStation 4 version of They Are Billions was the twentieth bestselling retail game during its first week of release in Japan, with 3,046 copies being sold.

=== Awards ===
The game was nominated for "Best Spanish Development" at the 2019 Titanium Awards.
