= Rise Eterna =

- Developer(s): Makee
- Publisher(s): Forever Entertainment
- Platform(s): Nintendo Switch, Windows, PlayStation 4, Xbox One
- Release: Nintendo Switch; May 13, 2021; Windows; June 9, 2021; PlayStation 4; PAL: August 5, 2021; NA: August 6, 2021; Xbox One; August 20, 2021
- Genre(s): Tactical role-playing
- Mode(s): Single-player

Rise Eterna is a tactical role-playing game developed by Makee and published by Forever Entertainment. It released in May 2021 for the Nintendo Switch, and later in the year for PlayStation 4, Xbox One, and Windows platforms.

== Gameplay ==
Rise Eterna is an indie video game that plays similarly to the Fire Emblem series of video games. The game plays as a tactical role playing game, where player move a team of characters across a grid-based environment to engage in turn-based battles. Unlike most games of the genre, characters do not earn experience points or level up in the traditional sense; instead, every time a character survives a battle, they earn a skill point, which can be used to unlock new abilities or higher stats. Defeated characters are forced off the battlefield, but no permadeath exists - they are available to fight in future levels. While the end goal is often to maneuver troops across the playing field to battle and eliminate all opposing troops, alternate goals, such as defeating or defending certain characters, or traversing characters to a certain part of the map without being defeated, arise as well. Unlike most games of the genre, there are no weapons or equipment to alter character stats; only items and stones that give temporary or permanent stat changes are available for use.

== Story ==
The game follows the protagonist Lua, a woman driven from her home after its destruction by bandits. In the past, she had previously been told to search out a man named Seevan if she were ever in trouble. After searching for, and finding, him with alongside her partner Natheal, she embarks on a journey to find her four sisters to find answers for questions regarding her past. Up to fourteen characters join in on the journey, some dependent on the actions of the player over the course of the game.

== Development and release ==
Developer Makee is based in France and Japan. The game was first released on May 13, 2021. The Windows PC version, released through Steam and GOG.com a month later on June 9, featured identical content and performance from its console counterparts. PlayStation 4 and Xbox One versions followed on August 6 and August 20, respectively. A physical edition of the Switch version was released months after its digital release; in addition to the game, it included an abridged version of the game's soundtrack, an art book, and a 3D diorama of a battle scene from the game.

== Reception ==
Rise Eterna generally garnered a mixed reception. Critics generally saw it as a moderately good, but flawed, effort at emulating Fire Emblem games. It was described as technically proficient without glitches or performances issues, and fluid character animations, but some of the character art was seen as generic. Views on the game's story were mixed, ranging from "engaging" to "serviceable" to "shallow". A common criticism was the game's overly large environments made traversing the game's map too long, and an overall lack of challenge or difficulty.

== Rise Eterna War ==
Rise Eterna War is a prequel to Rise Eterna and a combination of side-scrolling, minuscule real-time strategy and deck-builder. It was released for Microsoft Windows, Nintendo Switch, Xbox One, PlayStation 4, Xbox Series X/S, and PlayStation 5 on August 22, 2024. It was developed by Beast Games & Makee Games; and published by Forever Entertainment.

The game's story is set 10 years before events of Rise Eterna.
