= Creeper World =

2009 video game

- Developer: Knuckle Cracker
- Engine: Adobe AIR (CW, CW2); Adobe Flash Player (Browser CW); Unity (CW3, CW4)
- Platforms: Mac OS X, Windows, Linux
- Release: July 27, 2009
- Genres: Tower defense, Real-time strategy
- Mode: Single-player

Creeper World is a tower defense real-time strategy video game developed by Knuckle Cracker. The player must survive the onslaught of the titular blue "creeper" mass, which rises up on the playing field and attempts to destroy the base of operations, Odin City.

Two expansions were subsequently released. The first, Creeper World: Evermore, features randomly generated new maps that are generated daily. The second, Creeper World: User Space, features new graphics and a selection of 14 maps created by fans and collected by the original creators.

== Gameplay ==
Creeper World is a mix of real-time strategy and tower defense, where there is only one enemy and it can only be repelled rather than destroyed. The player must hold back a bluish-purple mass called the "Creeper", which has already destroyed most of humanity and is now attacking Odin City, humanity's last bastion. This is done by placing towers onto the battlefield which shoot at the Creeper. The main goal of the game is to connect the player's base to energy totems through the use of energy collectors and relays; doing so opens a jump gate which allows Odin City to teleport to a new planet and attempt to escape the Creeper again.

Units to attack the creeper are created in Odin City. In order to power their weapons, energy must be gathered by Collectors, which are placed by the player. These Collectors require space in order to harvest energy and must be connected to the city's network. Should a Collector become isolated by the Creeper it becomes inactive and must be joined to the rest of the network in order to continue providing energy. Additionally, the player must monitor energy production and consumption. If more energy is consumed than gained, weapons won't be able to be recharged as quickly. The game's landscapes have different elevations; the Creeper can quickly spread across low-lying areas but must gather before rising to higher ground, like a liquid. Here the player can create choke-points to try and prevent its spread. Blaster units can attack the Creeper if they have line-of-sight contact but cannot attack higher elevations, while mortars can throw bombs into denser regions of Creeper and attack higher elevations. In later missions, the player is able to collect nodes to allow them to update their systems. Six different upgrades are available. Three of these upgrades improve energy usage, while the other three improve weapon ability.

== Sequels ==
=== Creeper World 2: Redemption ===
The second game in the series, Creeper World 2: Redemption was released on May 16, 2011. It features new weapons, and a different angle of view, drastically changing the gameplay. Creeper World 2: Redemption has a cross-section view rather than a top-down perspective. This game also introduces the ability to destroy Creeper generators through the use of nullifiers, which is the main objective of most missions. The energy system also received an overhaul, with collectors removed in favor of reactors producing a fixed amount of energy. Packets of energy used to build structures and power weapons fly as opposed to needing connections. The Liberation Ship comes with a 12.5 packet range. However, you would need beacons to expand the range of your packets. Also, packets get destroyed when they come in contact with creeper. Also introduced is an upgrade system of technologies to make units more effective. New weapons, pickups and a ground digging mechanic fill out the rest of the new features. A new way to kill creeper was introduced called anti-creeper, you would use the ore rig unit to mine the ore deposits out of the ground and then build a unit called maker which makes anti-creeper. When one unit of anti-creeper comes in contact with one unit of creeper they both get annihilated leaving nothing in its place. A new enemy is introduced known as drones that can destroy your structures in one hit most of the time. Spores are still here in the form of phantoms, which target a building at random and proceed to pass through everything before transforming into liquid creeper at the destination. SAMs have been replaced by Phantom Coils.

=== Creeper World 3: Arc Eternal ===
The third game, Creeper World 3: Arc Eternal was released on October 4, 2013. Creeper World 3: Arc Eternal has more in common with the first Creeper World than the second. It returns to a top-down perspective with collectors requiring space to generate energy and connections to a command node to operate. Taken from the second game however, is the ability to destroy Creeper emitters, the ability to deploy anticreeper (via sprayers and bombers) and the technology upgrade system (though it functions differently). The goal of most Arc Eternal missions is to destroy all emitters and other creeper devices. Odin City has also been replaced with Command Nodes, of which three are available, allowing the player to take on a multiple front assault. A new feature in this game is the ability to terraform, raising and lowering the elevation of the ground with use of a terraform processing node (TERP). The scale of maps has also been bolstered, allowing for massive battles and necessitating a zoom mechanic. New aircraft are also introduced into this game allowing for energy transfer and air strikes, as well as massive siege weapons in the form of artillery and space battlecruisers.

On May 22, 2014, a browser-based minigame was released, Creeper World 3: Abraxis it consists of 12 new prequel missions, running on the Unity browser plug-in.

=== Creeper World 4 ===
Creeper World 4, the fourth game of the series had development started somewhere in 2017 and released in December 2020. This time the game is in a three dimensional perspective. Odin City is switched out for the Rift Lab, but still has an identical function.

=== Creeper World IXE ===
Creeper World IXE received a demo on May 29, 2024. The full game released on December 12, 2024. It introduces falling sand game mechanics.

== Reception ==
Reviewers stated that the original game has simplistic graphics, but praised Creeper World's gameplay. IGN's editor named it their Indie Pick of the Week, stating "Creeper World may not be much to look at, but it's got it where it counts in the gameplay department." Rock, Paper, Shotgun's Kieron Gillen stated that "Creeper World is the most apocalyptic game I've played in ages". Also Sin Vega in Rock, Paper, Shotgun said that "Creeper World 3 has the best monster of any game". Big Download's reviewer called Creeper World's graphics "ridiculously simple" but added "..that works in its favor -- their iconic nature makes for immediate identification..", allowing the player to see the whole battlefield as though it was a diagram.
