= Metal Knight =

1998 video game

铁甲风暴
- Metal Knight
- Developer: Object Software Limited
- Publishers: Object Software Limited; T-time Technology
- Platform: Microsoft Windows
- Release: (China) 1998 (Taiwan) 1998 (United States) 1999 (Italy) 1999
- Genre: Real-time strategy
- Modes: Single-player, multiplayer

Metal Knight (Chinese: 铁甲风暴; lit. 'Ironclad Storm') is a real-time strategy video game released in 1998, developed by Object Software Limited and published in mainland China by Object Software and in Taiwan by T-time Technology Co., Ltd. In 1999 the English version was published by Microforum in the United States and Italy. The game supports eight online players. The game sold over 300,000 copies and received high ratings from game magazines such as Popsoft and Play. It was followed by an expansion named Dark Front.
