= Celtic Kings: Rage of War =

2002 video game

Celtic Kings: Rage of War Imperivm
- European cover art
- Developer: Haemimont Games
- Publishers: NA: Strategy First (Note: Distributed by Red Ant Enterprises in Australia.); FRA: Wanadoo Edition
- Platform: Microsoft Windows
- Release: AU: August 19, 2002; NA: August 29, 2002; FRA: October 2, 2002
- Genres: Real-time strategy, role-playing
- Modes: Single-player, multiplayer

Celtic Kings: Rage of War is a game developed by Haemimont Games. It is set during the conquest of Gaul by Julius Caesar.

In Italy and Spain, the game is titled as Imperivm: La guerra gallica and Imperivm: La Guerra de las Galias. The game was re-released on digital storefronts via GOG on May 28, 2009, and Steam on September 5, 2019.

== Overview ==
Celtic Kings takes place in ancient Roman times, during the years that Julius Caesar was the military leader of the Roman Empire. There are three main modes: Adventure, single player (a classic real time strategy Skirmish mode), and multiplayer. Adventure mode includes a tutorial and the main story. In both campaigns, players control a hero named Larax. In the main story, he loses his wife in a Teutonic raid. In grief, he swears vengeance, and gives his body and soul to Kathubodua, the Goddess of War, to enable him to achieve his revenge.

== Genre ==
This game uses both role-playing and real-time strategy (RTS) elements. Units are controlled in a standard RTS fashion. Most units have the ability to gain levels. This is done either through fighting, training (to a certain limit, usually level 12), or, in the case of the priest/druid, learning from units with more experience (levels). In adventure mode, the player will constantly move between maps, which are all greatly varying in landscape and objectives. For dialogue, it is in the form of text, where the player has a choice of what to say.

== Gameplay ==
There are two main factions, the Romans and the Gauls. These two factions are diverse from each other, in terms of gameplay. Their units are different, with the superior Roman technology, while the Gauls depend on their numbers. There is a third, non-playable faction, the Teutons, a nomadic people who live in tents throughout the map. If non-allied units get too close to the tent, the Teutons will engage them in combat. These tents can be captured by killing all the Teutons within proximity of the tent.

There are two main resources in gameplay: food and gold. Food is mainly produced from villages or can sometimes be bought or captured. Food is an important resource for healing units and keeping them alive, since without it they can starve and lose health. Gold comes mainly from taxing the people of the cities, though it can also be captured, borrowed (with a significant interest rate), or earned with food trade or investments. It is used to produce and upgrade units. Unlike a traditional RTS, the player's resources are not "global". Mules and supply ships are used to transport resources between cities or supply an army on the march.

Structures cannot be constructed, and neither can they be destroyed. They can only be damaged or captured. This is much easier with a catapult, an immobile artillery unit built by up to ten military units to demolish enemy defenses and damage the units inside. This job is also possible with archers, but takes many of them to be effective. All structures have a loyalty rating, which gradually decreases if enemy military units are ordered to capture it, with too little allied units nearby to keep it. If the rating reaches zero, the structure surrenders to the conqueror's side.

There are hero units in the game, which are considerably more powerful than normal units. Heroes can attach units to themselves, giving them the ability to march in formation. The hero's experience is shared between the units under his/her command, making them stronger. Heroes can also recover artifacts from various temples located throughout the map, giving them special, albeit limited abilities such as healing friendly units and increased prowess in battle.

== Reception ==
Reception

Review scores
Publication	Score
Computer Gaming World	4.5/5
Game Informer	7 out of 10
PC Gamer (US)	78%
PC Zone	70/100

Celtic Kings became a hit in Spain, with sales above 100,000 units in the region by 2003. By 2006, it sold over 1 million copies in Spain, Italy and Latin America alone.

The game was well received by critics. IGN gave the game a rating of 8.2/10, GameSpot gave it a rating of 8.4/10, while Gamespy rated the game a 4.5/5. Gone Gold gave the game a score of 87/100, and Games Domain gave 4.5/5. The game was praised for its success in mixing the elements of RTS and RPG. Some criticisms include the somewhat overblown soundtrack and the voice acting.

ELiTeD scored the game 85 of 100, while ActionTrip scored it 83 of 100.
