= Against the Storm =

Against the Storm can refer to:

- Against the Storm (video game), 2023 city-building video game
- Against the Storm (radio program), intermittently from to 1939 to 1952
