= Hooded Horse =

Video game publisher

- Industry: Video games
- Founded: 2019
- Headquarters: Dallas, Texas, US
- Key people: Tim Bender (CEO); Snow Rui (CFO)
- Number of employees: 12 (2023)
- Website: hoodedhorse.com

Hooded Horse is an American video game publisher founded in 2019. Based in Dallas, Texas, the company is most known for publishing tactical and strategic games such as Against the Storm, Old World, Manor Lords, and 9 Kings.

== History ==
The company was founded in 2019. The company specializes in publishing tactical and strategic games with elements commonly seen in role-playing games. As a publisher, Hooded Horse will allocate a budget of at least $100,000 for localization and marketing for each project, and developers can retain 65% of all revenues generated following a game's release. Early games published by Hooded Horse include Terra Invicta, a grand strategy game from Pavonis Interactive, the studio behind the Long War mods for modern XCOM games, and Workers & Resources: Soviet Republic from 3Division. It then signed with Mohawk Games for the development of Old World, after the original publisher Starbreeze Studios abandoned the project as it encountered financial difficulties.

By 2023, the publisher had a total of 12 employees, and had published 20 games, most of which were released through Steam's early access program. Against the Storm was released in late 2023 to critical acclaim, and had sold over 1 million copies by March 2024. The company is set to publish Manor Lords (released through early access in April 2024), and Nova Roma from Lion Shield, the developer behind Kingdoms and Castles, among others. In June 2026, Beyond All Reason developers signs publishing deal with Hooded Horse to release their game on Steam.

== Games released ==
Year	Title	Developer(s)	Platform(s)
2022	Nebulous: Fleet Command (early access)	Eridanus Industries	Windows
2022	Old World	Mohawk Games	Windows
2022	Clanfolk (early access)	MinMax Games	Windows
2023	Against the Storm	Eremite Games	Windows, PlayStation 4, PlayStation 5, Xbox One, Xbox Series X/S
2024	Sons of Valhalla	Pixel Chest	Windows
2024	Manor Lords (early access)	Slavic Magic	Windows, Xbox One, Xbox Series X/S
2024	Empires of the Undergrowth	Slug Disco	Windows
2024	Workers & Resources: Soviet Republic	3Division	Windows
2024	Norland (early access)	Long Jaunt	Windows
2024	Breachway (early access)	Edgeflow Studio	Windows
2024	Shadow Gambit: The Cursed Crew (Note: Acquired publishing rights in December 2024)	Mimimi Games	Windows, PlayStation 5, Xbox Series X/S
2025	Cataclismo	Digital Sun	Windows
2025	Blacksmith Master (early access)	Untitled Studio	Windows, Mac
2025	9 Kings (early access)	Sad Socket	Windows, Mac
2025	Every Day We Fight (early access)	Signal Space Lab	Windows
2025	He is Coming (early access)	Chronocle	Windows
2025	Whiskerwood (early access)	Minakata Dynamics	Windows
2025	Super Fantasy Kingdom (early access)	Super Fantasy Games	Windows
2025	Battle Brothers (Note: Acquired publishing rights in December 2025)	Overhype Studios	Windows
2025	Darkwood	Acid Wizard Studio	Windows
2026	Terra Invicta	Pavonis Interactive	Windows
2026	MENACE (early access)	Overhype Studios	Windows
2026	Heart of the Machine	Arcen Games	Windows, Mac
2026	Nova Roma (early access)	Lion Shield	Windows, Mac
2026	Xenonauts 2	Goldhawk Interactive	Windows
2026	Heroes of Might and Magic: Olden Era (early access) (Note: Co-published by Ubisoft)	Unfrozen	Windows
2026	Endless Legend 2	Amplitude Studios	Windows, PlayStation 5, Xbox Series X/S
2026	Fogpiercer	Mad Cookies Studio	Windows, Mac, Linux
2026	Corsair Cove	Limbic Entertainment	Windows
2026	Sandustry (early access)	Lantto Games	Windows, Mac, Linux
2026	Beyond These Stars	Balancing Monkey Games	Windows
2027
2027	Bosslords	RocketMoose Studios	Windows
2027	Drill Keeper	ShoulderByte	Windows, Linux
2027	BELTFED	Hello World Studios	Windows, Mac, Linux
2027	Espiocracy	Ex Vivo Studios	Windows, Mac, Linux
2027	Fragile Existence	Fragile Continuum	Windows
2027	Gilded Destiny	Aquila Interactive	Windows
2027	Mars Tactics	Takibi Games	Windows
2027	Vaunted	Lost Lake Games	Windows
TBA
TBA	Darkwood 2	Ice-Pick Lodge	Windows, Xbox Series X/S
TBA	Falling Frontier	Stutter Fox Studios	Windows
TBA	C-Beams	Distant Light Games	Windows
TBA	Beyond All Reason		Windows, Linux
TBA	Substructure	Dubious Design	Windows
TBA	Rogue Carrier	Wild Fields	Windows
