= Andre Young (disambiguation) =

Andre Young (born 1965), better known as Dr. Dre, is an American rapper.

Andre Young may also refer to:

- Andre Young (American football) (born 1953), American football player
- Andre Young (basketball) (born 1990), American basketball player
- André Young (YouTuber) (born 1994), Brazilian YouTuber
