= Battle Brothers =

2017 video game

- Developer: Overhype Studios
- Publishers: Overhype Studios; Hooded Horse (Windows)
- Platforms: Windows, Switch, PlayStation 4, PlayStation 5, Xbox One, Xbox Series X and S
- Release: WW: March 24, 2017 (Windows); WW: March 11, 2021 (Switch); WW: January 13, 2022 (other consoles)
- Genre: Tactical role-playing
- Mode: Single-player

Battle Brothers is a tactical role-playing game developed by Overhype Studios. It was released by Overhype on the PC in 2017, and console versions were released in 2021 and 2022. In 2025, Hooded Horse acquired the publishing rights for the Windows version of the game.

== Gameplay ==
Players establish a mercenary company in a fantasy world inspired by medieval Germany and take contracts. Early game recruits are frequently drunks, criminals, and people who have crippled limbs, as they are the best the player can afford. Characters can become crippled during combat, both physically and emotionally. In the late game, additional challenges appear in the form of major crises. The game's difficulty, including the initial crisis, is configurable. The game features permadeath and can optionally prohibit save scumming.

== Development ==
The Windows version of Battle Brothers left early access on March 24, 2017. It was released for the Switch on March 11, 2021. PlayStation 4 and 5, Xbox One, and Xbox Series X and S versions were released on January 13, 2022. Downloadable content, some of it free, has continued to be published through 2022, and the game supports mods through third-party websites, such as Nexus Mods. On December 2, 2025, American publisher Hooded Horse announced that it had acquired the publishing rights for the PC version of Battle Brothers, although the deal would not affect the game's console versions.

== Reception ==
Reception

Aggregate score
Aggregator	Score		
Aggregator	NS	PC	PS4
Metacritic	74/100	80/100	71/100

Review scores
Publication	Score		
Publication	NS	PC	PS4
Nintendo World Report	8.5/10		
PC Gamer (US)		84/100	
PCGamesN		8/10	
RPGamer			3/5
RPGFan		82/100	
Digitally Downloaded	3.5/5		

Although he criticized the game's lack of a useful tutorial and poor inventory management, Ian Birnbaum wrote in this review for PC Gamer, "Battle Brothers takes a formula I love and twists it to fit a wide-open medieval setting." RPGFan reviewer Bob Richardson wrote that the PC version "demands your time, but grants rewards with a thrilling and earthy experience". PCGamesN included it in their list of best turn-based strategy games for the PC. Commenting on the game's punishing difficulty, Joel A. DeWitte of Nintendo World Report said, "It's a world I want to dive into again and again, even if I know this incarnation will be just as taxing." Jon Jansen of RPGamer praised the game's combat system but said the user interface was poorly designed for consoles. Digitally Downloaded's reviewer, Matt S., called the Switch version's tutorial incompetent and said it would cause many potential fans to give up on the game. However, he said, "Once you get the hang of Battle Brothers, though, it's very difficult to put it down."
