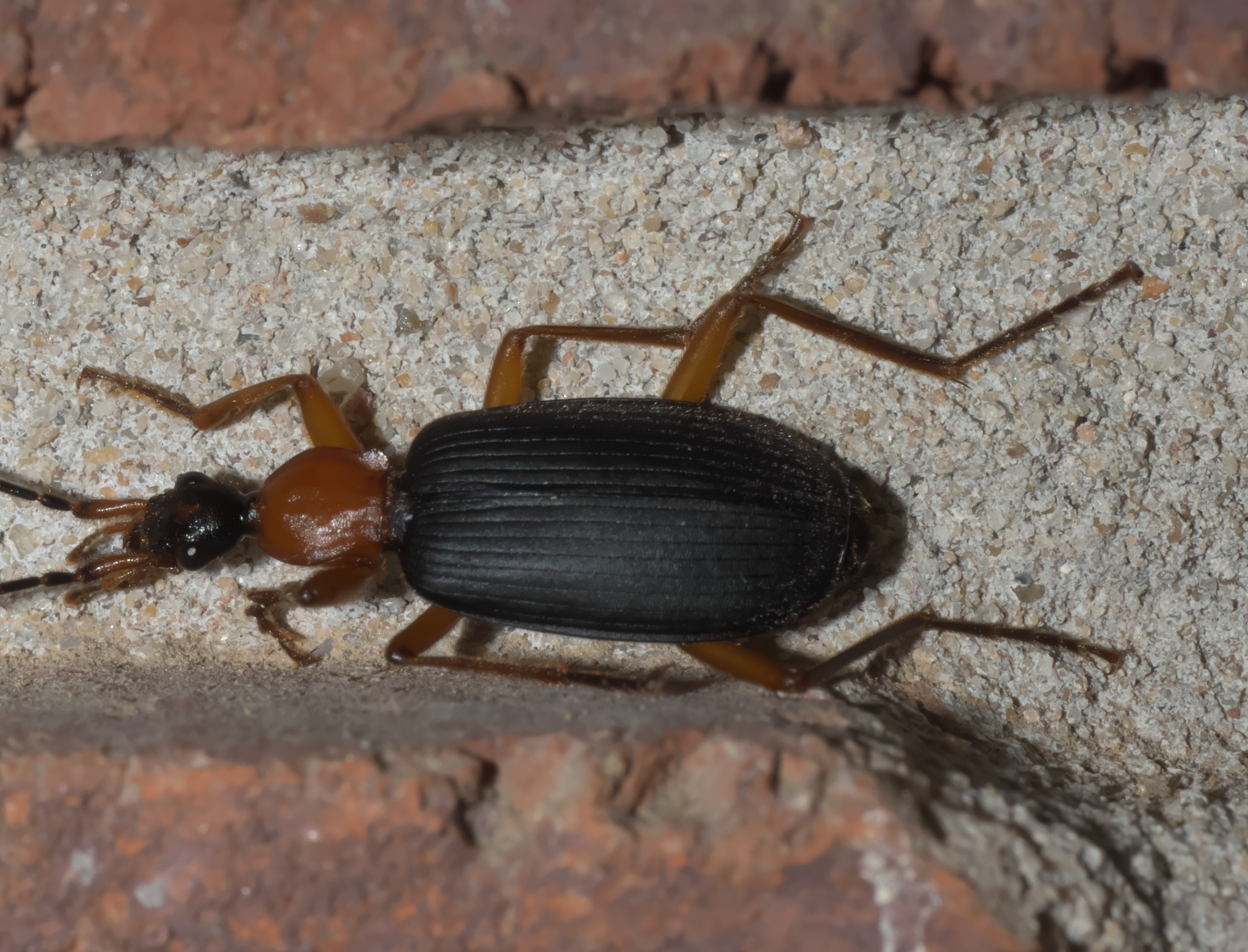

Scientific classification
- Kingdom: Animalia
- Phylum: Arthropoda
- Class: Insecta
- Order: Coleoptera
- Suborder: Adephaga
- Family: Carabidae
- Genus: Galerita
- Species: G. janus

Binomial name
- Galerita janus (Fabricius, 1792)

Synonyms
- Galerita angusticeps Casey, 1920

= Galerita janus =

Species of beetle

Galerita janus is a species of ground beetle in the family Carabidae. It is found in North America.
