= Sandustry =

- Developer: Lantto Games
- Publisher: Hooded Horse
- Platforms: Linux; macOS; Windows
- Release: August 13, 2026 (early access)
- Genres: Simulation; Sandbox
- Mode: Single-player

Sandustry is a crafting and automation sandbox video game developed by Swedish solo developer Lantto Games and published by Hooded Horse. It was made available via Steam early access on August 13, 2026 for Windows, MacOS, and Linux. The game features a procedurally generated open world, terrain destruction, particle physics, and factory design. It uses a two-dimensional pixel art style. The starting objective is to mine for gold and explore the fictional planet PX-47, discovering the remnants of an extinct civilization in the process. The game's available mechanisms grow in number and complexity as the player advances through the skill tree. It was met with positive reviews after launching in early access.

== Gameplay ==
The player controls a small alien creature that can fly using a form of jet propulsion. The ability to hover and pass through player-built structures can be unlocked early on, a feature that Rock Paper Shotgun described as making the player avatar a "glorified cursor".

The initial goal of the game is to collect gold. This is accomplished by building machines using blocks that can be freely placed, moved, and destroyed for no cost. The player is able to use conveyor belts and vertical "launcher" blocks to move sand and other materials around. There are a variety of available methods for extracting gold; initially, sand is soaked in water and then passed through a shaker block, which separates the sand into gold and residue, in a process resembling gold panning. Gold can be captured and transferred to collector zones placed by the player, while the residue can later be burned and compacted into gold using the kinetic press block.

As the player progresses through the game's preset goals, they can use gold to unlock further blocks and upgrades in the skill tree. The first goal is to process a certain amount of wet sand to unlock the second tier in the skill tree. New goals unlock further tiers that contain more upgrades, presenting new mechanisms and increased complexity. The player can explore underground cave systems to find resources and strata, or layers of sediment, rock, and soil that can be mined. There are also randomly placed underground structures.

== Plot ==
The game opens with a short mission brief that establishes that the unnamed player character, an alien life form, is assigned by overseer Archon Pri to build a gold factory on the fictional planet PX-47, which shows signs of an extinct civilization. Upon accepting the mission, the player is contacted by Flight Officer Zoe, a green cat wearing sunglasses, who serves as the game's tutorial non-player character (NPC), introducing the game's core concepts and controls, as well as giving basic advice on construction and gold extraction. Shortly after being introduced to Zoe, the player is given a prompt to launch to the surface in an orbital drop pod to begin the tutorial.

== Design ==
Sandustry is two-dimensional and uses a pixel art style, with each pixel representing the game's smallest unit of a given resource. The pixels for free-moving objects like sand and gold have particle physics, while liquids have flow mechanics and thermal properties such as boiling and freezing. The game features a procedurally generated open world that uses a modifiable random seed to influence the generation process. Terrain can be freely destroyed by the player after having unlocked the necessary tools, gating exploration into some biomes behind upgrades. There are multiple biomes that can be explored, including the starting grassy area and a desert.

== Reception ==
Sandustry had sold over 100,000 copies by August 20, 2026, with early Steam reviews and press coverage being positive. The game had 97% positive reviews on steam after launching in early access and was rated as "overwhelmingly positive". Rock Paper Shotgun called it "satisfying", while noting that there is a learning curve and success requires planning and experimentation. Kotaku's John Walker called the game "brainfully compelling". The two-dimensional format and terrain-destruction features have been compared to the 2011 sandbox video game Terraria.
