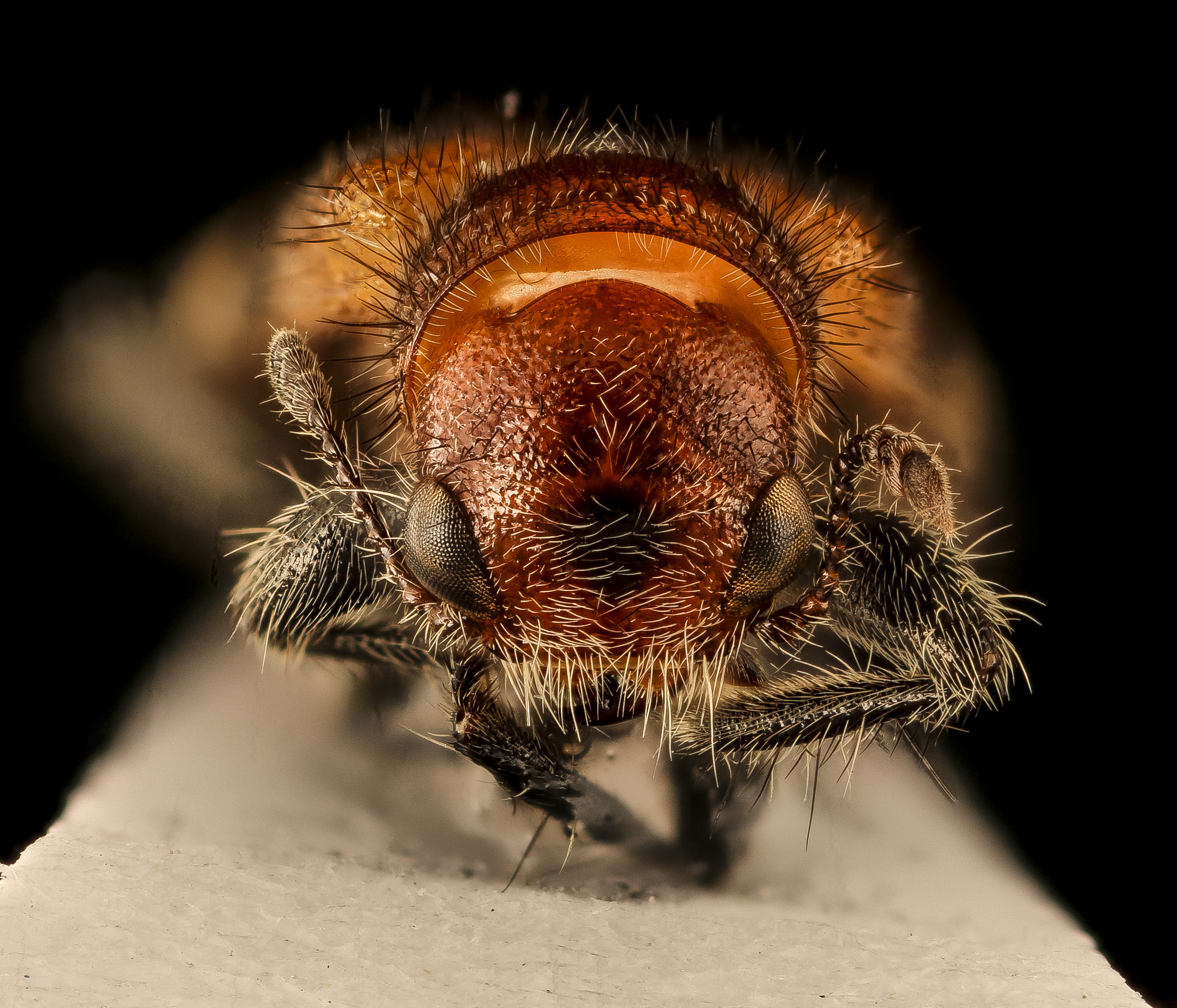

Scientific classification
- Domain: Eukaryota
- Kingdom: Animalia
- Phylum: Arthropoda
- Class: Insecta
- Order: Coleoptera
- Suborder: Polyphaga
- Infraorder: Cucujiformia
- Family: Cleridae
- Genus: Enoclerus
- Species: E. nigripes

Binomial name
- Enoclerus nigripes (Say, 1823)

= Enoclerus nigripes =

Species of beetle

Enoclerus nigripes is a species of checkered beetle in the family Cleridae. It is found in Central America and North America.

== Subspecies ==
These two subspecies belong to the species Enoclerus nigripes:

- Enoclerus nigripes nigripes (Say, 1823)
- Enoclerus nigripes rufiventris (Spinola, 1844) (redbellied clerid)
