= Enoclerus laetus =

Scientific classification
- Domain: Eukaryota
- Kingdom: Animalia
- Phylum: Arthropoda
- Class: Insecta
- Order: Coleoptera
- Suborder: Polyphaga
- Infraorder: Cucujiformia
- Family: Cleridae
- Genus: Enoclerus
- Species: E. laetus

Binomial name
- Enoclerus laetus (Klug, 1842)

Species of beetle

Enoclerus laetus is a species of checkered beetle in the family Cleridae. It is found in Central America and North America.

== Subspecies ==
These five subspecies belong to the species Enoclerus laetus:

- Enoclerus laetus abruptus (LeConte, 1858)
- Enoclerus laetus chapini Wolcott, 1922
- Enoclerus laetus intergivus Barr, 1976
- Enoclerus laetus laetus (Klug, 1842)
- Enoclerus laetus nexus Barr, 1976
