= Enoclerus coccineus =

Scientific classification
- Domain: Eukaryota
- Kingdom: Animalia
- Phylum: Arthropoda
- Class: Insecta
- Order: Coleoptera
- Suborder: Polyphaga
- Infraorder: Cucujiformia
- Family: Cleridae
- Genus: Enoclerus
- Species: E. coccineus

Binomial name
- Enoclerus coccineus (Schenkling, 1906)

Species of beetle

Enoclerus coccineus is a species of checkered beetle in the family Cleridae. It is found in Central America and North America.

== Subspecies ==
- Enoclerus coccineus coccineus (Schenkling, 1906)
- Enoclerus coccineus desertus Barr, 1976
