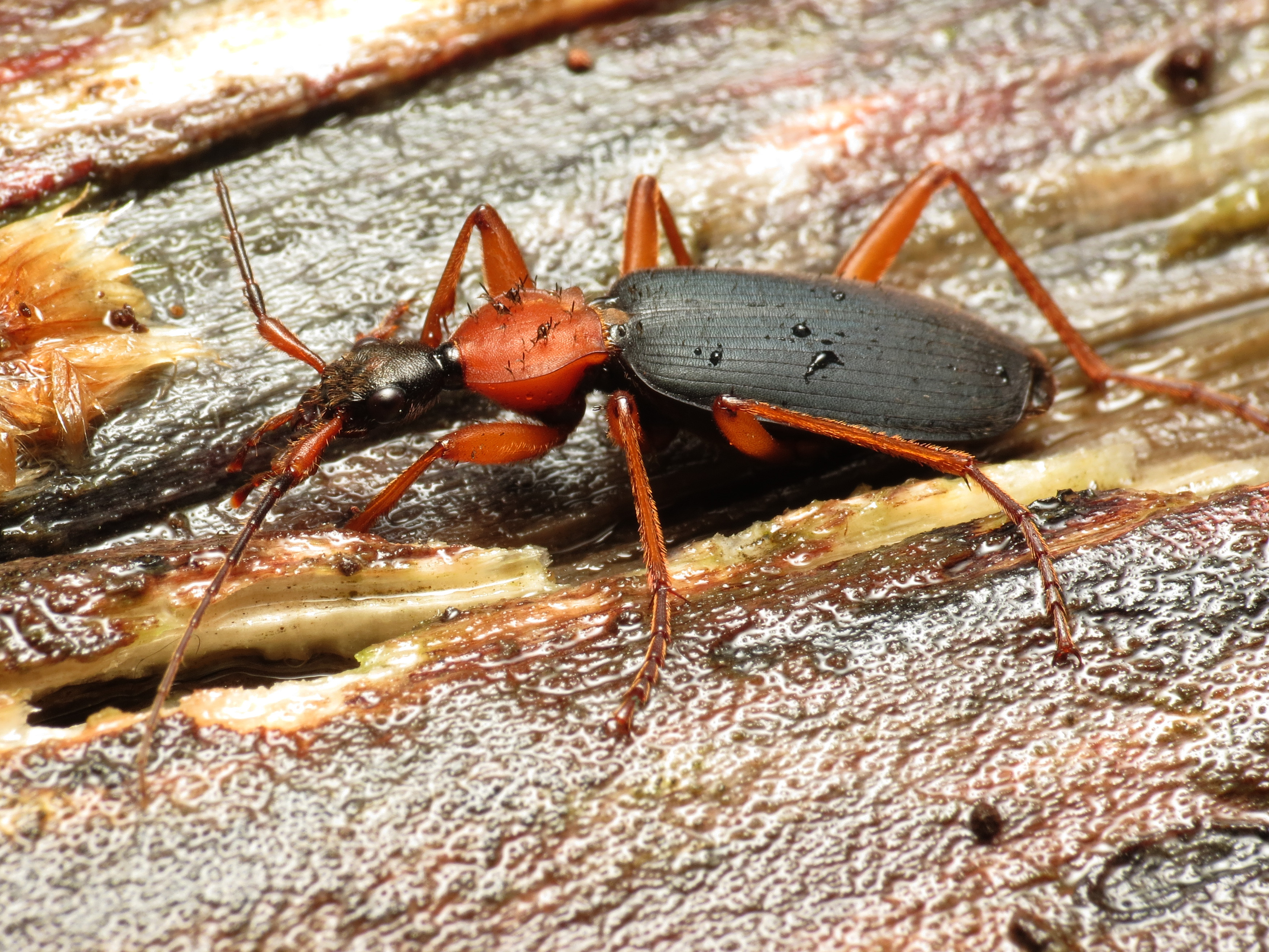
- Galerita lecontei. Rock Creek Park, Washington, DC, USA

Scientific classification
- Kingdom: Animalia
- Phylum: Arthropoda
- Clade: Pancrustacea
- Class: Insecta
- Order: Coleoptera
- Suborder: Adephaga
- Family: Carabidae
- Genus: Galerita
- Species: G. lecontei

Binomial name
- Galerita lecontei Dejean, 1831

= Galerita lecontei =

Species of beetle

Galerita lecontei, the false bombardier beetle, is a species of ground beetle in the family Carabidae. It is found in the Caribbean Sea, Central America, North America, and the Caribbean. They are primarily characterized by their dark coloration, rapid movement, lifespan longevity, and nocturnal hunting behavior. Their elytra, which are the hardened forewings provide protection for their hind wings and exhibit a glossy texture. Many species within this family can secrete harmful chemicals as a defense mechanism against predators. Furthermore, this species has evolved various predator deterrents, often in the form of dischargeable glands near their abdominal area, a common feature across several beetle families, including Carabidae, Dytiscidae, and Gyrinidae.

== Description ==
The False Bombardier Beetle ranges from 14.9 to 20.0 mm long and is bodily and bilaterally symmetric. These beetles are mostly black, with a red/orange color displayed on their thorax and legs. They are known for having a unique defense mechanism, which consists of spraying out fluid from an abdominal gland when threatened. This mechanism serves to ward off predators and keep the beetle safe.

== Geographic range ==
The False Bombardier Beetle is mainly located in the Caribbean, Middle America, and North America, with its origins in the continental US and Native Mexico. Sightings of this beetle have been recorded heavily in the eastern and western regions of the United States, with high concentrations in California, Florida, and North Carolina. Other subspecies of this beetle have been seen in Mesoamerica and the West Indies.

A recent study published in 2023 collected beetles in Sialkot, (a main district in the province of Punjab), Pakistan. These beetles were collected from the summer of 2020 to 2021, over the course of 11 months. The subspecies Galerita lecontei veracruz was discovered in this search, being the first sighting of these beetles in Pakistan.

== Habitat ==
Bombardier beetles live in a wide range of environments and choose to live in a place that contains enough moisture to lay eggs. These locations can consist of temperate zone woodlands or grasslands, often marked by moist micro-environments such as under logs and in leaf litter piles where they can hide under.

== Physical feeding features ==
In ground beetles, there are multiple feeding methods that exist, such as fluid or semi-fluid feeding. The False Bombardier beetle employs a semi-fluid model, ingesting mainly fluids and semi-fluids with fragments, such as arthropod fragments. These methods can be influenced by physical features, such as body structure, bone length, and other causes like habitat or environment that affect feeding habits and patterns.

Different forces can affect the length of a beetle's body, such as the speed of running, or pushing and pulling forces that can horizontally extend the length of the beetle. Bone length, such as the pro-femoral, meso-femoral, meta-femoral, and tibial lengths also correlate with the length of the body in a beetle. Galerita lecontei have long femora and long tibiae. They appear to have longer bones in comparison with the Scarites subterraneus beetle, another species of ground beetle with very short femora and tibiae. These different physical attributes can affect the locomotion and physical fitness of the ground beetles. Scarites subterraneus tend to be slow at running but have strong pushing abilities. This is in contrast to the Galerita Lecontei, who show weak pushing abilities.

Additionally, different body forms, such as narrow and wide or flatter and curvier, can affect the livelihood and habits of a ground beetle. The prothorax of the Galerita lecontei, or the anterior segment of the thorax, is shallow and narrow, possibly giving the beetle an advantage while hunting, allowing for improved maneuverability or enhanced speed. The Scarites subterraneus has a body designed for the reduction of friction while moving and easing burrowing and movement into confined spaces. The body of this beetle is more or less cylindrical, and the hind, rear side of the body is more narrow and flat.

== Feeding habits ==
Although there is no information on the specific feeding patterns of G. lecontei, the family Carabidae, or ground beetles, they have a range of diets, that are both herbivorous and carnivorous. These beetles hunt smaller insects typically at night, and then aggregate together in dark and damp locations during the day. A 1940 study examined the eating behaviors of different ground beetles in response to various foods, such as crickets, stink bugs, nymphs, ants, spiders, as well as larva. It was determined that carabid beetles have little food selectivity and will eat any form of food that can be penetrated. However, the beetles do have a preference towards larva, in what is believed to be a preference towards the soft bodies, which are easy to eat and capture.

== Reproduction and life cycle ==
Ground beetles tend to lay eggs in places that are safe from predators while also being in close vicinity of a food source. A few examples of places like this could be underground tunnels or cracks in wood that also have living organisms that can be used as a food source. The life cycle is as such: the egg hatches and then enters the larval stage. In the larval stage, the beetle occasionally molts while receiving sustenance from food sources. Once it sheds its skin for the final time, it metamorphoses and becomes a pupa. This stage marks the stage at which the juvenile beetle most closely resembles the adult that it will soon be. When the pupal stage is over, the pupa's skin will shed, and the pupa is now an adult bombardier beetle. The life span of ground beetles is around several weeks, and during this time, they will have the chance to mate and pass on their genes through reproduction.

== Defensive protection ==
A notable feature of the False Bombardier beetle is their competitive defensive system to obtain resources and survive. The Galerita lecontei has a "pair of abdominal defensive glands" that secrete a solution that can be sprayed at competitors as a form of assault. This solution consists of formic acid (80% of its composition), acetic acid, and lipophilic components, or long-chain hydrocarbons and esters.

=== Anatomy of gland ===
There are two glands in the beetle, which are positioned adjacently in the abdominal cavity, and covered by other internal body parts like the fat, gut, and reproductive organs. An individual gland contains 4 components. It contains a dense collection of secretory cells, which can be drained through the efferent duct, a significant coiled structure which is resistant to compression. There is also a kidney-shaped storage sac, which are enveloped by compressor muscles, and an ejaculatory duct positioned with an opening near the abdominal tip, through which secretion can be discharged.

=== Discharge of spray ===
When testing the direction and quality of the spraying of this fluid, researchers attempted to trigger beetles by pinching their appendages. The response to this was an accurately aimed release of fluid, possibly guided by the downward movement of the abdominal tip. The fluid ejection was also carried out unilaterally, as the spray would occur on the same side of the triggered appendage. The ejection of fluid sprayed like a jet-like stream. It also oscillated during its course, eventually hitting the stimulated beetle leg.

=== Content of fluid ===
The composition of the fluid sprayed by the beetle is important in understanding the reason for ejection. Different fluid compositions can serve different purposes, acting as a response to various threats. Additionally, the amount of fluid excreted can differ from beetle to beetle, based on factors like size and availability of fluid. The change in the amount of fluid ejected could also be due to simple sample issues, as it has been seen in research studies that the quantity of spray decreases with successive spraying incidents.

On average, the content of the gland fluid is about 80% formic acid, or 4.56 mg per beetle. G. lecontei release about 0.8 mg of fluid with every ejaculation, containing about 0.7 mg of formic acid. Thus, the gland content is depleted in about 6.5 sprays.

Other species in the Carabidae family also use the defense mechanism of pygidial gland secretion. Research performed in 2010 observed the secretion habits of beetles in the Platynini and Sphodrini tribes of ground beetles, attempting to analyze the correlation between sex or size of the beetle, and the ejection of the spray. It was shown that within species there is no correlation between the output of spray and the sex of the beetle, or between the output of spray and the size of the beetle. This can be explained by the fact that males and females elicit similar defensive responses to the similar predators they encounter. Across species, however, there is a relationship between spray output and body size, because of the varying body sizes across different beetles.

=== Effect on ants ===
Although specific amounts of fluid spray containing formic acid or hydrocarbons can be lethal to ants, the average spray events from beetles were found to be much smaller than the quantity needed to actually kill an ant. Typically, the quantity of formic acid in a fluid composition was relatively equivalent to the amount produced by one to a few ants, but the hydrocarbon makeup was about "10 times the total gland content in one ant." When spraying ants with this fluid, carabid beetles tend not to work together to create a cooperative defense, as they tend to be more antisocial in their behavior. Although an individual who exhausts their supply of fluid would be able to kill an ant, they tend not to do so, as soliciting only a little bit of fluid as an alarm signal is sufficient to act against an ant.

== Conservation status ==
The Galerita lecontei has no special status on the IUCN, nor does literature exist about its possible threat of endangerment or extinction. This beetle is widely spread across North America.

== Subspecies ==
These four subspecies belong to the species Galerita lecontei:

- Galerita lecontei bicoloripes (Reichardt, 1967)
- Galerita lecontei lecontei Dejean, 1831
- Galerita lecontei tenebricosa Klug, 1834
- Galerita lecontei veracrucis Ball & Nimmo, 1983
