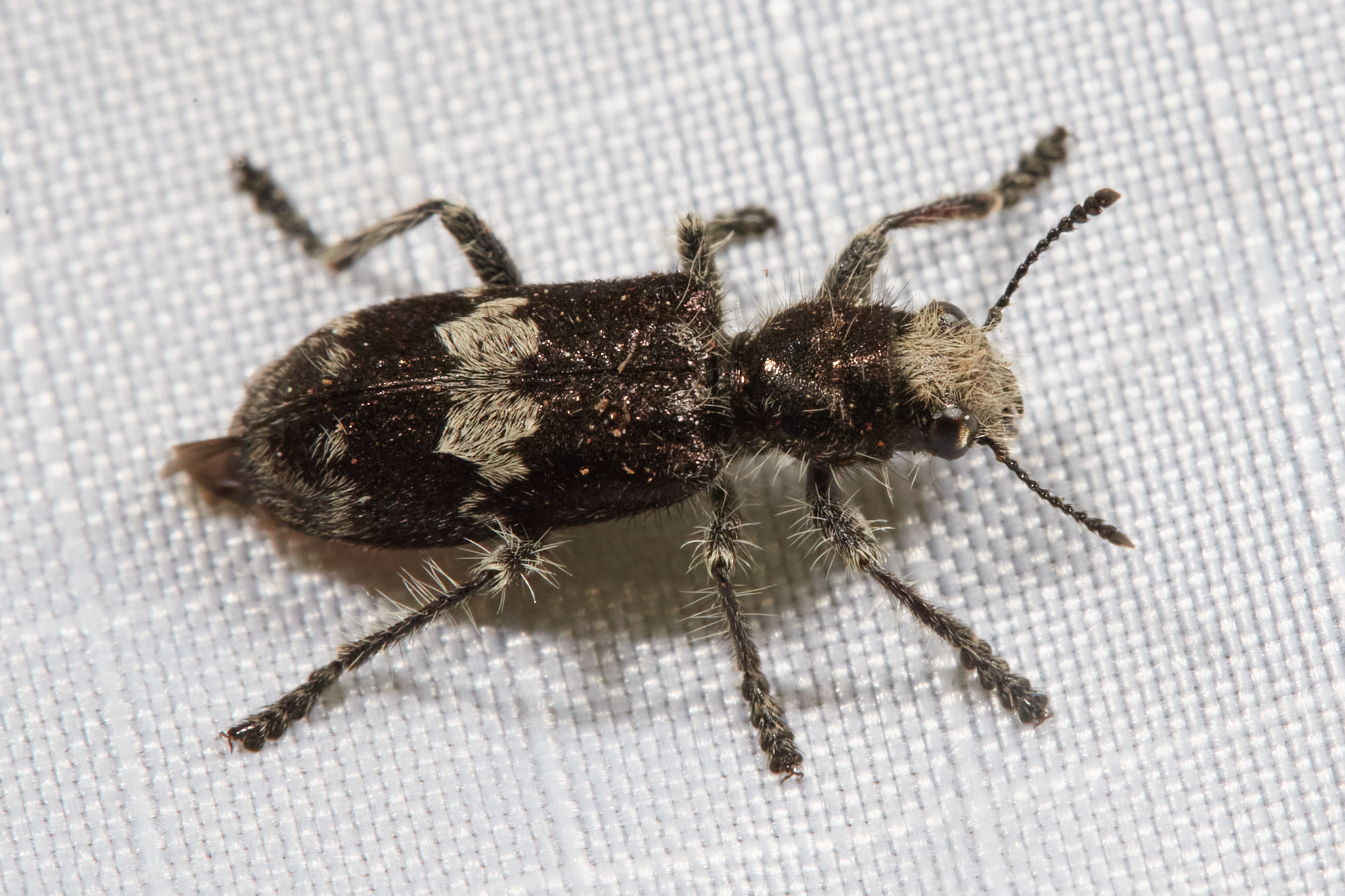

Scientific classification
- Kingdom: Animalia
- Phylum: Arthropoda
- Clade: Pancrustacea
- Class: Insecta
- Order: Coleoptera
- Suborder: Polyphaga
- Infraorder: Cucujiformia
- Family: Cleridae
- Genus: Enoclerus
- Species: E. sphegeus

Binomial name
- Enoclerus sphegeus (Fabricius, 1787)

= Enoclerus sphegeus =

Species of beetle

Enoclerus sphegeus, the red-bellied clerid, is a species of checkered beetle in the family Cleridae. It is found in Central America and North America. It is a predator of many small insects, and is an important predator of the bark beetle Dendroctonus ponderosae, as the larvae are predators of D. ponderosae larvae and eggs. This species pupates underground.
