= Beyond All Reason =

Upcoming RTS video game

- Engine: Recoil
- Platforms: Windows, Linux
- Genre: Real-time strategy
- Modes: Single-player, Multiplayer

Beyond All Reason is a free, open-source science fiction real-time strategy (RTS) video game currently in development, available for both Windows and Linux. Built on a fork of the SpringRTS Engine known as Recoil, Beyond All Reason draws heavy inspiration from older RTS titles like Total Annihilation and Supreme Commander. Although still in its alpha stage, the game is fully playable and can be downloaded for free via the project's website.

In its current state, Beyond All Reason features single-player skirmish, scenario modes, multiplayer PvP, and co-op modes. The development team plans to release the game on platforms such as Steam once key milestones like campaign and matchmaking are achieved.

== History ==
Beyond All Reason has evolved over the years from a lineage of community-driven projects within the SpringRTS Engine. The engine, released under the open-source GPL license in April 2005, was designed to recreate the gameplay style of Total Annihilation, a classic RTS by Cavedog. This sparked the interest of developers and RTS enthusiasts, leading to the creation of numerous projects that expanded the SpringRTS community's portfolio of games. Among the notable titles developed within this engine was Absolute Annihilation, a game rooted in the UberHack mod for Total Annihilation. A later fork of Absolute Annihilation, called Balanced Annihilation, served as the gameplay foundation for Beyond All Reason.

Initially, Beyond All Reason began as an effort to replace all content tied to Total Annihilation's intellectual property and gradually developed into an entirely original game. The first artwork was showcased in 2010, and development continued sporadically until 2013, when the project lost momentum and was abandoned. In 2019, a new generation of developers, along with the original creators of Beyond All Reason, revived the project, bringing it into a playable state. Since then, Beyond All Reason has been in continuous development, improving aspects of the game and its infrastructure.

In June 2026, the developers signed a publishing deal with Hooded Horse for Steam release.

== Gameplay ==
The game offers the choice of three factions, Armada and Cortex as well as an experimental faction Legion. Armada focuses on speed and stealth tactics. Cortex focuses on brute force tactics. Legion units are typically weaker but multi-functional. Each faction has its own set of robotic infantry (bots), vehicles, aircraft, and naval units. The game is played by starting with one unit, The Commander. Similarly to a king in chess, the first player who eliminates their opponent's Commander unit wins the game. Beyond All Reason features multiple game modes, including 1v1, team games of up to 8 players per side, horde modes against computer controlled opponents and single-player scenarios for offline play.

Beyond All Reason has two resources, energy and metal. The player can acquire the energy resource by building wind turbines, solar collectors, geothermal powerplants or nuclear power generators. Metal can be acquired by building extractors over metal deposits, or by reclaiming the metal in the wrecks of defeated enemy or allied units. In contrast to many other real-time strategy games, Beyond All Reason features a streaming economy where resources on the map are not finite, but instead can be scaled up infinitely with resource production buildings and units. This is intended to afford players the use of increasingly destructive units over time, which are more expensive and effective at their roles.

Physics and terrain play a role in combat and strategy. All projectiles are simulated in real time, and have to account for the terrain topography with their trajectories. Terrain features block the radar signal, enabling hiding units from the opponent behind obstructions. The unit types interact with terrain in different ways. Whereas bots can scale a large hill, vehicles have trouble on such a steep incline. This allows for a trade-off between maneuverability and firepower when choosing what units to build.

Beyond All Reason descends from Total Annihilation, and many of the core gameplay elements are similar. However, there are many differences that define Beyond All Reason as a distinct game. The new 3D engine allows for a much more complex fully simulated and larger scale game, while interface improvements simultaneously increase the ability for a player to micromanage the orders of individual units.

On top of the improved engine is a customizable interface framework written in Lua, that modernizes the original interface. For instance, orders to a group of units can be dragged in a line, given over a circular area, and/or also cycled or put on repeat. Many of the UI features, such as the ability to line drag units, significantly change the original gameplay.

== Development ==
=== Recoil Engine ===
The Recoil Engine is a fork of the SpringRTS engine with numerous performance and other improvements. For example:

- Additional multi-threaded pathfinding
- Remastered textures, effects and lighting
- New modern GL4 renderer

The Recoil Engine's networking capabilities and ability to simulate large-scale battles were showcased during a community event celebrating 40,000 Discord members. During this event, matches featured record-breaking player counts, with up to 80 or 110 participants in a single game (and a theoretical maximum of 160 players in a single match). This milestone attracted attention from the wider gaming community and was covered by various gaming news outlets and content creators.

== Reception ==
Beyond All Reason has been well received by both the community and in reviews. Reviews note the game's large amount of strategic depth, difficult learning curve, PVP gameplay, large-scale battles featuring hundreds of units, and its high level of polish.

PCMag summarized it as "the best RTS release in years." PC Gamer stated, "Beyond All Reason pushes boundaries with some utterly enormous community celebration brawls." German gaming news magazine GameStar praised it for "The biggest and most bombastic battles you've ever seen in an RTS". Over time, a sizable community has formed around the project. It gained widespread international recognition and earned 20th place in Rock Paper Shotgun's favorite strategy games of all time ranking.

In giving his first impressions of the game, Total Annihilation and Supreme Commander designer Chris Taylor stated that seeing the impact of his original work was "surreal", and that his work had become bigger than him, "its own institution", with projects inspired by his work becoming "part of the body that is this phenomenon".
