= Enoclerus lunatus =

Scientific classification
- Domain: Eukaryota
- Kingdom: Animalia
- Phylum: Arthropoda
- Class: Insecta
- Order: Coleoptera
- Suborder: Polyphaga
- Infraorder: Cucujiformia
- Family: Cleridae
- Genus: Enoclerus
- Species: E. lunatus

Binomial name
- Enoclerus lunatus (Klug, 1842)

Species of beetle

Enoclerus lunatus is a species of checkered beetle in the family Cleridae. It is found in North America.
