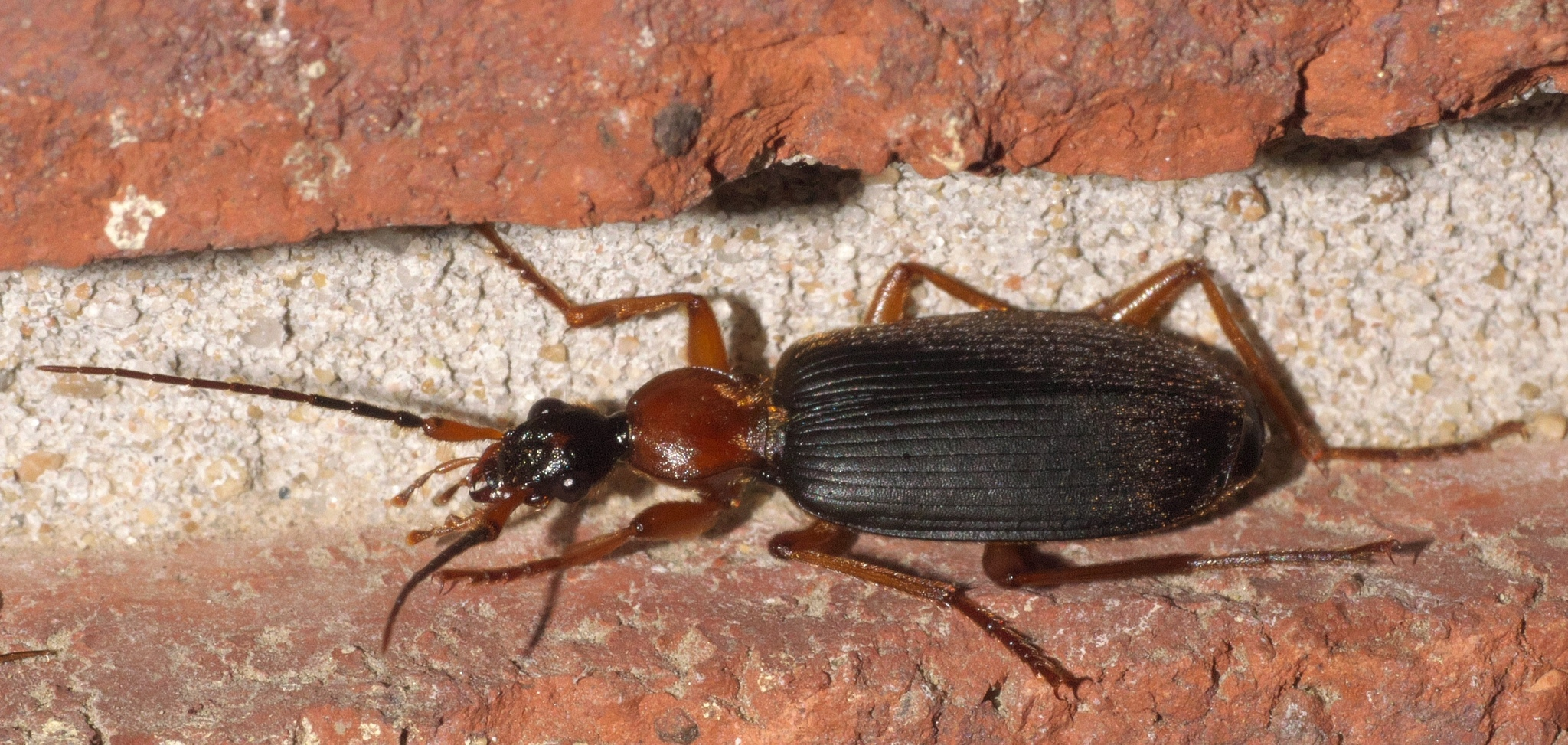
- Galerita bicolor, Oklahoma

Scientific classification
- Domain: Eukaryota
- Kingdom: Animalia
- Phylum: Arthropoda
- Class: Insecta
- Order: Coleoptera
- Suborder: Adephaga
- Family: Carabidae
- Subfamily: Harpalinae
- Tribe: Galerini
- Genus: Galerita; Fabricius, 1801

Subgenera
- Galerita Fabricius, 1801; Progaleritina Jeannel, 1949

= Galerita =

Genus of beetles

Galerita is a genus in the beetle family Carabidae. There are more than 90 described species in Galerita.

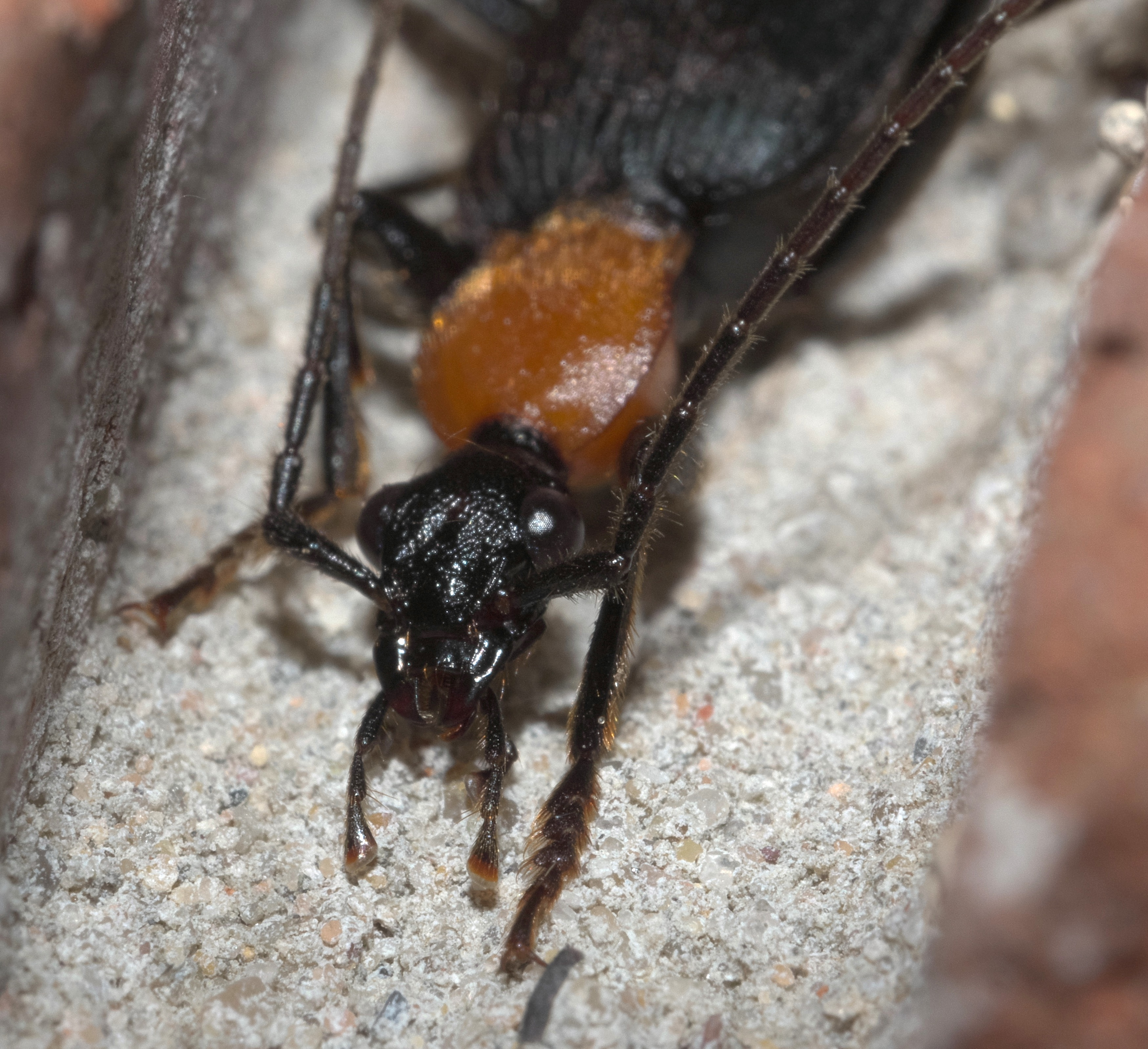
Galerita mexicana

== Species ==
These 99 species belong to the genus Galerita:

- Galerita aenigmatica Reichardt, 1971
- Galerita aequinoctialis Chaudoir, 1852
- Galerita aethiopica (Basilewsky, 1984)
- Galerita affinis Dejean, 1831
- Galerita africana Dejean, 1825
- Galerita amazonica Liebke, 1939
- Galerita americana (Linnaeus, 1758)
- Galerita amethystina Reichardt, 1967
- Galerita angustipennis Gerstaecker, 1867
- Galerita aptinoides (Basilewsky, 1963)
- Galerita atripes LeConte, 1858
- Galerita attelaboides (Fabricius, 1781)
- Galerita attenuata Quedenfeldt, 1883
- Galerita azteca Reichardt, 1967
- Galerita balli Reichardt, 1976
- Galerita batesi Andrewes, 1923
- Galerita beauvoisii Chaudoir, 1861
- Galerita bicolor (Drury, 1773)
- Galerita boliviana Reichardt, 1967
- Galerita borneensis Hovorka, 2019
- Galerita boucardii Chaudoir, 1869
- Galerita brachinoides Perty, 1830
- Galerita brasiliensis Dejean, 1826
- Galerita bruchi Liebke, 1932
- Galerita carbonaria Mannerheim, 1837
- Galerita carinifrons L.Schaufuss, 1887
- Galerita championi Bates, 1884
- Galerita chinensis Hovorka, 2019
- Galerita coeruleipennis Chaudoir, 1861
- Galerita collaris Dejean, 1826
- Galerita colonensis Hovorka, 2016
- Galerita convexipennis Reichardt, 1967
- Galerita corumbana Liebke, 1932
- Galerita costalimai Reichardt, 1967
- Galerita costulata Liebke, 1939
- Galerita esmeraldina Reichardt, 1967
- Galerita feae Bates, 1892
- Galerita femoralis Murray, 1857
- Galerita forreri Bates, 1883
- Galerita gracilis Brullé, 1837
- Galerita guangdongensis Hovorka, 2019
- Galerita haeckeli Hovorka, 2017
- Galerita hexagonica Liebke, 1939
- Galerita homolaci Hovorka, 2012
- Galerita hrdlickai Hovorka, 2017
- Galerita immitis Liebke, 1937
- Galerita inca Reichardt, 1967
- Galerita indica Chaudoir, 1861
- Galerita interstitialis Dejean, 1831
- Galerita inversa (Basilewsky, 1963)
- Galerita isthmica Reichardt, 1967
- Galerita janus (Fabricius, 1792)
- Galerita javana Jedlicka, 1965
- Galerita jelskii Chaudoir, 1877
- Galerita lacordairei Dejean, 1826
- Galerita laevithorax Reichardt, 1967
- Galerita lecontei Dejean, 1831
- Galerita loeffleri Jedlicka, 1966
- Galerita lunai (Basilewsky, 1963)
- Galerita madecassa Fairmaire, 1880
- Galerita marginicollis Laporte, 1834
- Galerita melanarthra Chaudoir, 1869
- Galerita mexicana Chaudoir, 1872
- Galerita microcostata Darlington, 1934
- Galerita moritzi Mannerheim, 1837
- Galerita mustelina Bates, 1884
- Galerita nana Reichardt, 1967
- Galerita nigra Chevrolat, 1835
- Galerita occidentalis (Olivier, 1795)
- Galerita orbignyi Brullé, 1837
- Galerita orientalis Schmidt-Goebel, 1846
- Galerita orobia Reichardt, 1967
- Galerita palustris Liebke, 1939
- Galerita perrieri (Fairmaire, 1901)
- Galerita pheropsophoides (Jeannel, 1949)
- Galerita procera Gerstaecker, 1867
- Galerita pseudoventricosa Reichardt, 1967
- Galerita reichardti Ball & Nimmo, 1983
- Galerita rubens Bates, 1888
- Galerita rubripes (Jeannel, 1949)
- Galerita ruficeps Chaudoir, 1861
- Galerita ruficollis Dejean, 1825
- Galerita seminigra Chaudoir, 1883
- Galerita similis Hovorka, 2017
- Galerita simplex Chaudoir, 1852
- Galerita simplicicarinata Reichardt, 1967
- Galerita stenodera Chaudoir, 1854
- Galerita strandi Liebke, 1939
- Galerita striata Klug, 1834
- Galerita sulcipennis Reichardt, 1967
- Galerita tonkinensis Hovorka, 2019
- Galerita toreuta Andrewes, 1933
- Galerita tremolerasi Liebke, 1939
- Galerita tristis Reiche, 1842
- Galerita tucumana Liebke, 1932
- Galerita unicolor Latreille & Dejean, 1823
- Galerita ventricosa Lucas, 1857
- Galerita wrasei Hovorka, 2019
- † Galerita marshii Scudder, 1900
