= 9 Kings =

Upcoming video game

- Developer: Sad Socket
- Publishers: Hooded Horse, INSTINCT3
- Director: Rafael Melo
- Producer: André Young
- Programmer: Gustavo Lazzarini
- Artists: Thiago Pedro, Gustavo Sideowip
- Engine: Unity
- Platforms: Windows, macOS
- Release: May 23, 2025 (early access)
- Genres: Strategy, Roguelike, Kingdom Builder, Tower Defense, Casual
- Mode: Single-player

9 Kings is a strategy video game developed by Sad Socket and published by Hooded Horse and INSTINCT3. The game was released in early access on May 23, 2025 for Windows and macOS.

== Gameplay ==
9 Kings is a fast-paced kingdom builder roguelike with deck-building and tower defense elements. The player must grow their empire with unique cards while fighting large-scale battles against the 9 kings.

== Development ==
9 Kings was developed by Sad Socket, an indie game studio based in São Paulo and New York City. The studio was founded by the childhood friends Rafael Melo and André Young.

The game was developed over the course of two years with the ambition to be "a casual game for strategy fans who are also very busy people". The developers perceived the game as an experimental project, not anticipating its commercial success. After the prototype was nominated for Best Game at Gamescom LATAM, they pivoted to scale up development and completely revamped the game for its full release.

On May 25, 2024, the demonstration version of the game titled "3 Kings" was released on Itch.io Website, where only 3 Kings were playable, after the launch of early access in 2025, the page was deactivated.

== Reception ==
9 Kings gained global notability after March's Steam Next Fest, where it became the most played strategy game of the event. The Early Access version of 9 Kings was released on May 23, selling over 250,000 copies in its first week and hitting Steam's top sellers global charts. In the first month of Early Access, the game sold over 400,000 copies and has been getting continued critical acclaim from the public. The game has received positive reception for its minimalistic design and replayable mechanics.

The game was nominated for Best Early Access Game at the Golden Joystick Awards 2025.
