= Enoclerus cordifer =

Scientific classification
- Domain: Eukaryota
- Kingdom: Animalia
- Phylum: Arthropoda
- Class: Insecta
- Order: Coleoptera
- Suborder: Polyphaga
- Infraorder: Cucujiformia
- Family: Cleridae
- Genus: Enoclerus
- Species: E. cordifer

Binomial name
- Enoclerus cordifer (LeConte, 1849)

Species of beetle

Enoclerus cordifer is a species of checkered beetle in the family Cleridae that occurs in North America.
