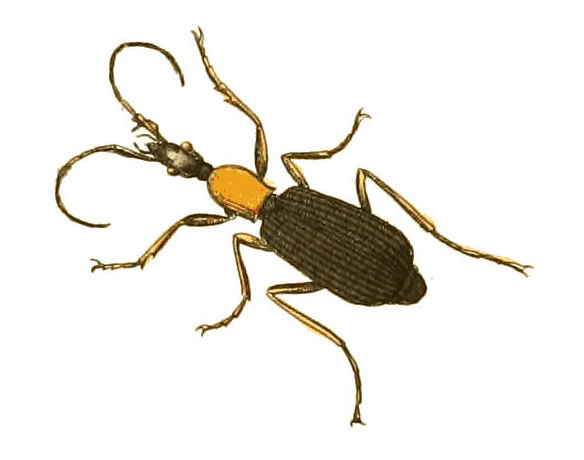

Scientific classification
- Kingdom: Animalia
- Phylum: Arthropoda
- Clade: Pancrustacea
- Class: Insecta
- Order: Coleoptera
- Suborder: Adephaga
- Family: Carabidae
- Genus: Galerita
- Species: G. americana

Binomial name
- Galerita americana (Linnaeus, 1758)

= Galerita americana =

Species of beetle

Galerita americana is a species of beetles in the family Carabidae. It is native to Central and South America (Bolivia, Brazil, Colombia, Costa Rica, French Guiana, Guatemala, Panama, Paraguay, Suriname and Venezuela).

== Description ==
Head very long, black, with a red brown spot on the middle. Antennae dark brown, the basal joint being longest, thickest, and lightest coloured; the others are nearly of equal length; the whole being a little longer than the elytra. Neck distinct and black. Thorax light red brown, and almost oval, about the length of the head, and a little broader; it is also a little margined, and next the body truncate. Scutellum minute, black, and triangular. Elytra black, margined and furrowed, oval next the thorax, but more square at their extremities, and not covering the anus. Abdomen black. Breast light red brown; as are all the legs. The basal joints of the posterior tarsi are very long. Length of body ¾ inch (19 mm).
