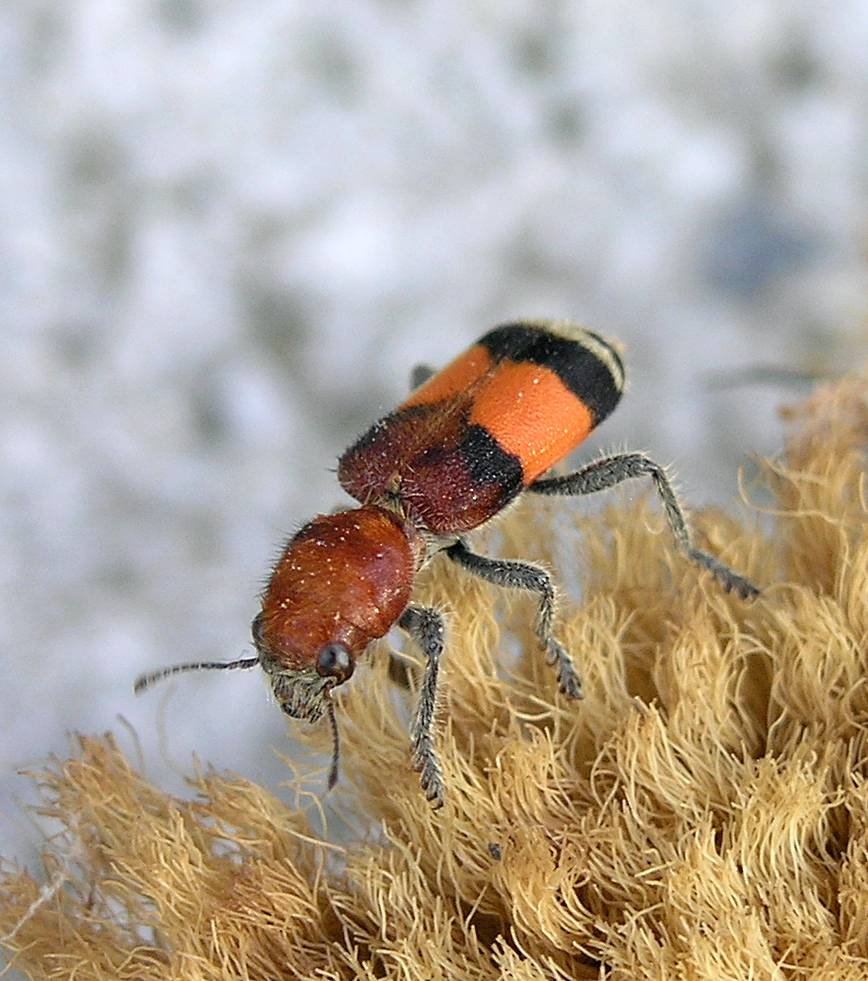

Scientific classification
- Kingdom: Animalia
- Phylum: Arthropoda
- Clade: Pancrustacea
- Class: Insecta
- Order: Coleoptera
- Suborder: Polyphaga
- Infraorder: Cucujiformia
- Family: Cleridae
- Genus: Enoclerus
- Species: E. ichneumoneus

Binomial name
- Enoclerus ichneumoneus (Fabricius, 1777)

= Enoclerus ichneumoneus =

Species of beetle

Enoclerus ichneumoneus is a species of checkered beetle in the family Cleridae. It is found in North America.

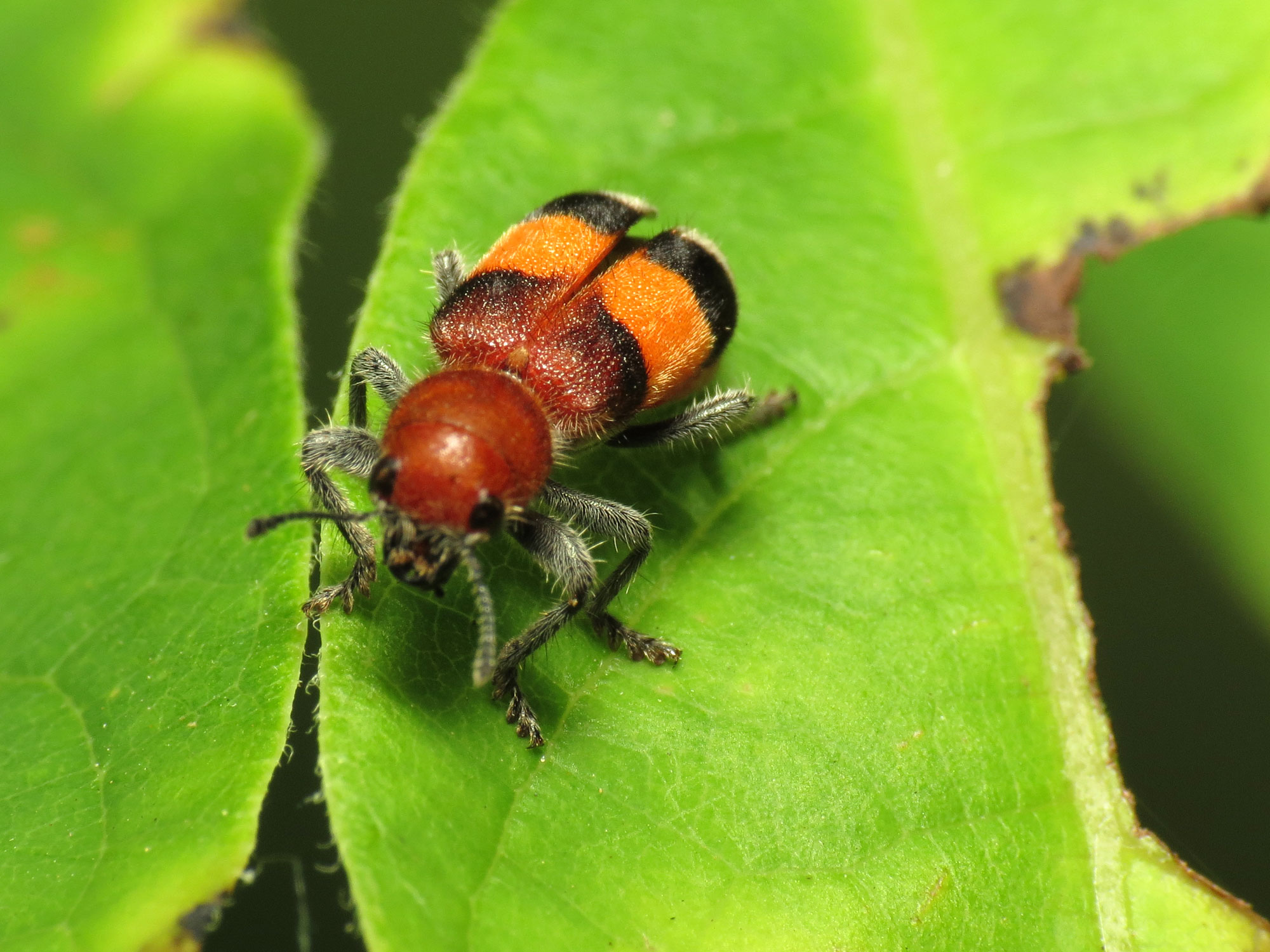
