= Galerita aequinoctialis =

Scientific classification
- Domain: Eukaryota
- Kingdom: Animalia
- Phylum: Arthropoda
- Class: Insecta
- Order: Coleoptera
- Suborder: Adephaga
- Family: Carabidae
- Subfamily: Harpalinae
- Genus: Galerita
- Species: G. aequinoctialis

Binomial name
- Galerita aequinoctialis Chaudoir, 1852

Species of beetle

Galerita aequinoctialis is a species of ground beetle in the family Carabidae. It is found in North America.
