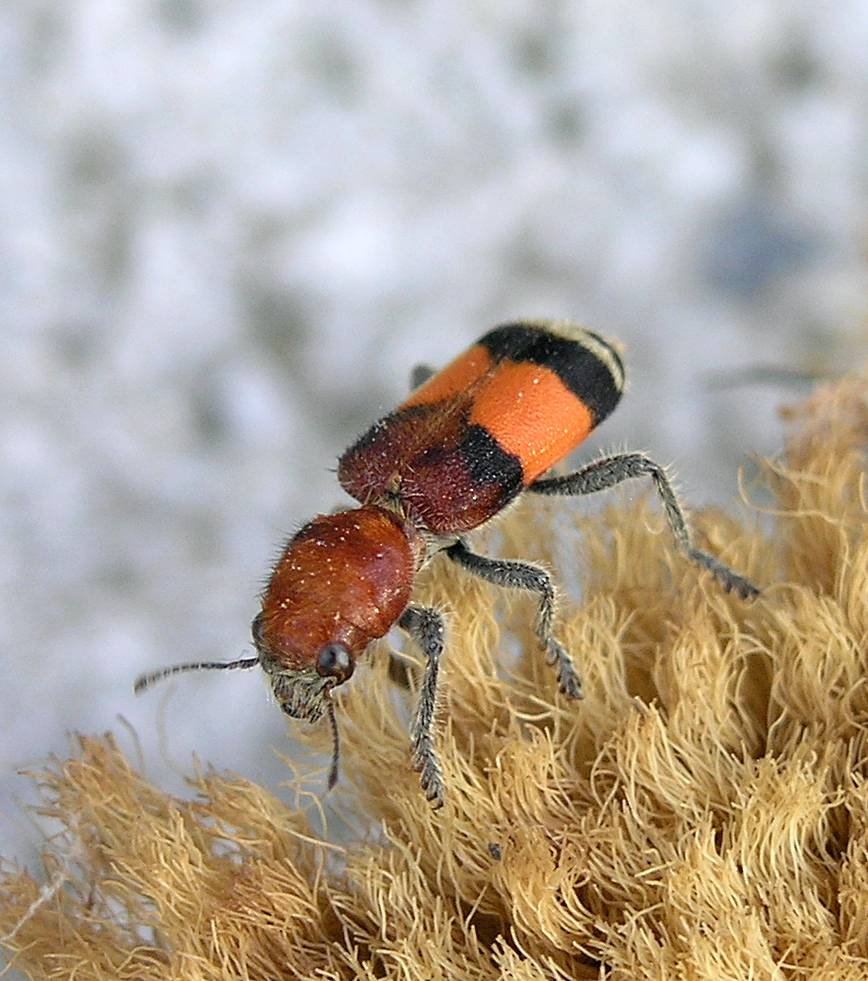
- Enoclerus ichneumoneus

Scientific classification
- Domain: Eukaryota
- Kingdom: Animalia
- Phylum: Arthropoda
- Class: Insecta
- Order: Coleoptera
- Suborder: Polyphaga
- Infraorder: Cucujiformia
- Family: Cleridae
- Subfamily: Clerinae
- Genus: Enoclerus; Gahan, 1910

Synonyms
- Poecilochroa Chevrolat

= Enoclerus =

Genus of beetles

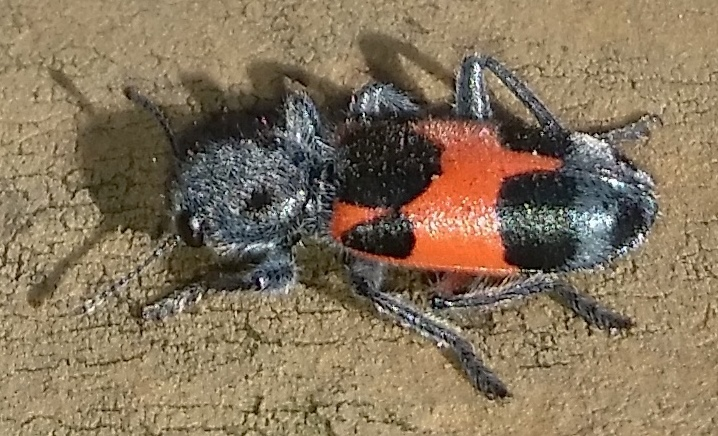
Enoclerus eximius

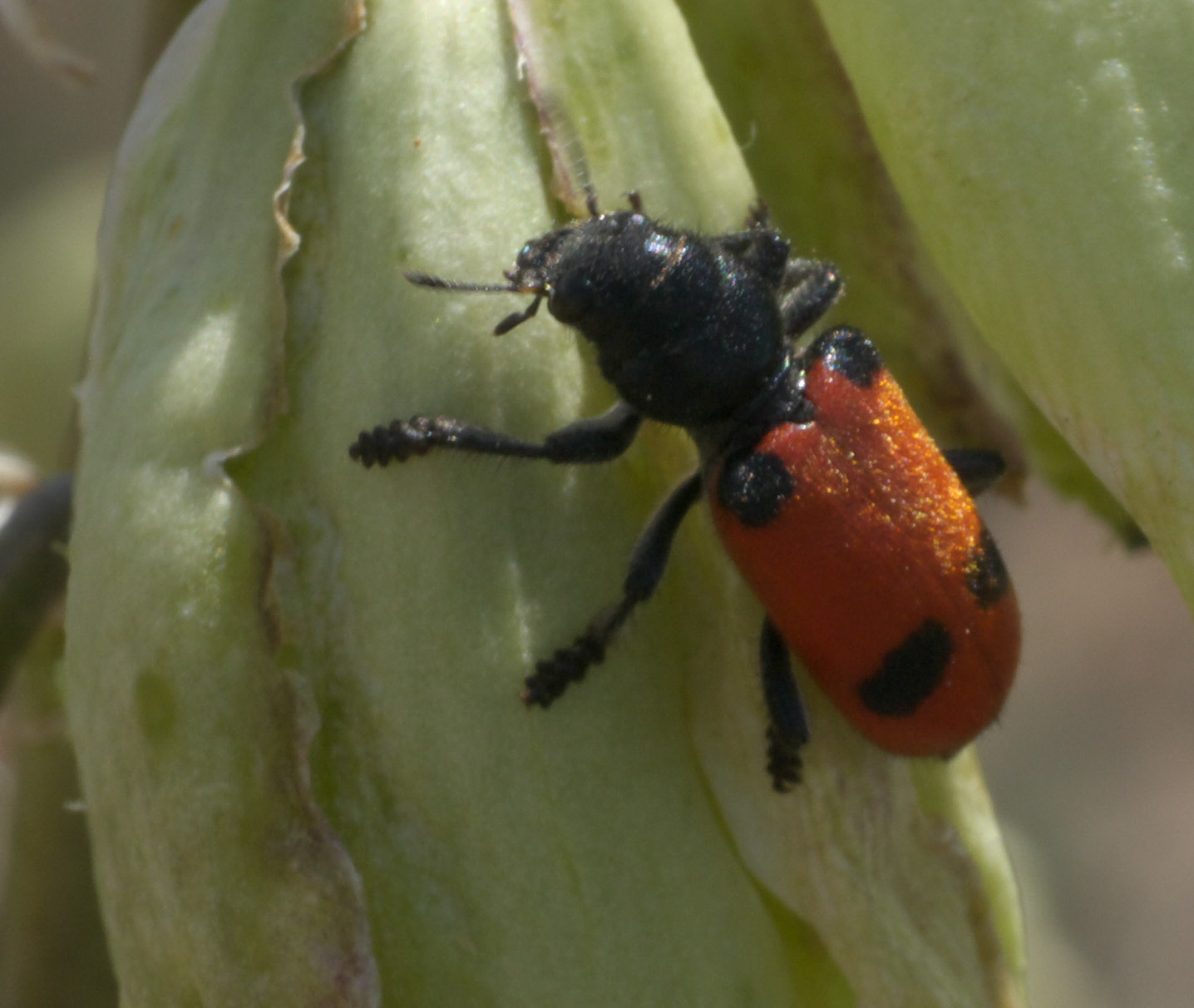
Enoclerus spinolae

Enoclerus is a genus of checkered beetles in the subfamily Clerinae.

== Species ==
These species belong to the genus Enoclerus:

- Enoclerus abdominalis (Chevrolat, 1835)
- Enoclerus ablusus Barr, 1978
- Enoclerus acerbus Wolcott, 1911
- Enoclerus addisoni Rifkind, 2004
- Enoclerus aethiops Barr, 1978
- Enoclerus albidulus Rifkind, 2012
- Enoclerus albosignatus Ekis, 1976
- Enoclerus alvarengai Ekis, 1976
- Enoclerus analis (LeConte, 1849)
- Enoclerus anceps (Gorham, 1882)
- Enoclerus anctus Rifkind, 2012
- Enoclerus angustus (LeConte, 1849)
- Enoclerus apicatus (Schenkling, 1906)
- Enoclerus arachnodes (Klug, 1842)
- Enoclerus arrowi (Schenkling, 1907)
- Enoclerus artifex (Spinola, 1844)
- Enoclerus aspera Opitz, 2021
- Enoclerus auripilus Ekis, 1976
- Enoclerus axilaris (Erichson, 1847)
- Enoclerus badeni (Gorham, 1876)
- Enoclerus bahia Opitz, 2021
- Enoclerus barri Knull, 1965
- Enoclerus beatus (Gorham, 1882)
- Enoclerus bellamyi Rifkind, 1996
- Enoclerus bellus (Schenkling, 1898)
- Enoclerus bicarinatus (Gorham, 1882)
- Enoclerus bilobus (Spinola, 1844)
- Enoclerus bimaculatus (Skinner, 1905)
- Enoclerus binodulus (Gorham, 1876)
- Enoclerus bispinis Wolcott, 1927
- Enoclerus boblloydi Rifkind, 2012
- Enoclerus bolivar Opitz, 2021
- Enoclerus bombycinus (Chevrolat, 1833)
- Enoclerus boquete Rifkind, 2012
- Enoclerus brevicollis (Spinola, 1844)
- Enoclerus campbelli Opitz, 2021
- Enoclerus canus Ekis, 1976
- Enoclerus capillus Opitz, 2021
- Enoclerus caraca Opitz, 2021
- Enoclerus cautus (Gorham, 1883)
- Enoclerus cauca Opitz, 2021
- Enoclerus cavei Rifkind, 2012
- Enoclerus ceara Opitz, 2021
- Enoclerus cedro Opitz, 2021
- Enoclerus chagra Opitz, 2021
- Enoclerus chamelae Rifkind, 2012
- Enoclerus cinctus Opitz, 2021
- Enoclerus cinereopilosus (Blanchard, 1843)
- Enoclerus citricornis Rifkind, 2012
- Enoclerus citrinifrons Rifkind, 2017
- Enoclerus coccineus (Schenkling, 1906)
- Enoclerus colorados Opitz, 2021
- Enoclerus comptus (Klug, 1842)
- Enoclerus concinnus (Gorham, 1883)
- Enoclerus condinamarca Opitz, 2021
- Enoclerus contractus (Gorham, 1882)
- Enoclerus corcovado Opitz, 2021
- Enoclerus cordifer (LeConte, 1849)
- Enoclerus cosnipata Opitz, 2021
- Enoclerus crabronarius (Spinola, 1844)
- Enoclerus crinitus Rifkind, 2012
- Enoclerus cupressi Van Dyke, 1915
- Enoclerus cura Opitz, 2021
- Enoclerus cusco Opitz, 2021
- Enoclerus decussatus (Klug, 1842)
- Enoclerus deletus Wolcott, 1927
- Enoclerus deliciolus (Gorham, 1876)
- Enoclerus delusus Rifkind, 2017
- Enoclerus dichrous Chapin, 1927
- Enoclerus distinctus (Spinola, 1844)
- Enoclerus erro Wolcott, 1922
- Enoclerus erwini Ekis, 1976
- Enoclerus eximius (Mannerheim, 1843)
- Enoclerus faber (Chevrolat, 1874)
- Enoclerus farragoinis Opitz, 2021
- Enoclerus fascia Opitz, 2021
- Enoclerus fasciatus (Schenkling, 1900)
- Enoclerus fasciicollis (Schenkling, 1900)
- Enoclerus fauna Opitz, 2021
- Enoclerus faustus (Schenkling, 1900)
- Enoclerus festivus (Gorham, 1876)
- Enoclerus fibrillatus Rifkind, 2012
- Enoclerus flavibasis Chapin, 1927
- Enoclerus fractus Opitz, 2021
- Enoclerus franki Barr & Rifkind, 2007
- Enoclerus fugitivus Wolcott, 1927
- Enoclerus gabriellae Rifkind, 1994
- Enoclerus gerhardi Wolcott, 1922
- Enoclerus gibboclerus Opitz, 2021
- Enoclerus gibbus Ekis, 1976
- Enoclerus gilli Rifkind, 2012
- Enoclerus gorgona Opitz, 2021
- Enoclerus grenade Opitz, 2021
- Enoclerus guiana Opitz, 2021
- Enoclerus gumae Rifkind, 1995
- Enoclerus hefferni Rifkind, 2021
- Enoclerus hespenheidei Rifkind, 2012
- Enoclerus hieroglyphicus (Gorham, 1876)
- Enoclerus hoegei (Gorham, 1883)
- Enoclerus hogei (Gorham, 1882)
- Enoclerus hovorei Barr & Rifkind, 2007
- Enoclerus huallaga Opitz, 2021
- Enoclerus huila Opitz, 2021
- Enoclerus ichneumoneus (Fabricius, 1777)
- Enoclerus incanus Rifkind, 2017
- Enoclerus inimicoides Chapin, 1927
- Enoclerus inyoensis Van Dyke, 1938
- Enoclerus irregularis Barr, 1978
- Enoclerus itajura Opitz, 2021
- Enoclerus junin Opitz, 2021
- Enoclerus juquilensis Rifkind, 2016
- Enoclerus kaw Opitz, 2021
- Enoclerus knabi (Wolcott, 1910)
- Enoclerus laetus (Klug, 1842)
- Enoclerus laportei (Spinola, 1844)
- Enoclerus larioja Opitz, 2021
- Enoclerus lautus Wolcott, 1922
- Enoclerus lecontei (Wolcott, 1910) (blackbellied clerid)
- Enoclerus leehermani Ekis, 1976
- Enoclerus liljebladi Wolcott, 1922
- Enoclerus longissimus Wolcott, 1922
- Enoclerus loreto Opitz, 2021
- Enoclerus losvolvanes Opitz, 2021
- Enoclerus lugubris (Erichson, 1847)
- Enoclerus lunatus (Klug, 1842)
- Enoclerus luridus Opitz, 2021
- Enoclerus luscus (Klug, 1842)
- Enoclerus maldonado Opitz, 2021
- Enoclerus mata Opitz, 2021
- Enoclerus matamata Opitz, 2021
- Enoclerus meta Opitz, 2021
- Enoclerus mcnallyi Rifkind, 2012
- Enoclerus melissae Rifkind, 2012
- Enoclerus meridanus (Chevrolat, 1874)
- Enoclerus mexicanus (Castelnau, 1836)
- Enoclerus militaris (Schenkling, 1906)
- Enoclerus minas Opitz, 2020
- Enoclerus miniatus (Spinola, 1844)
- Enoclerus mocho Rifkind, 2012
- Enoclerus moestus (Klug, 1842)
- Enoclerus monteverde Opitz, 2021
- Enoclerus morrisi Opitz, 2021
- Enoclerus mutabilis (Chevrolat, 1874)
- Enoclerus muttkowskii (Wolcott, 1909)
- Enoclerus napo Opitz, 2021
- Enoclerus nelsoni Barr, 1978
- Enoclerus nigricans Barr, 1978
- Enoclerus nigrifrons (Say, 1823)
- Enoclerus nigripes (Say, 1823)
- Enoclerus nigromaculatus (Chevrolat, 1843)
- Enoclerus nodulifer Gorham, 1927
- Enoclerus nova Opitz, 2021
- Enoclerus obrieni Ekis, 1976
- Enoclerus ocreatus (Horn, 1885)
- Enoclerus octavus Opitz, 2021
- Enoclerus opifex (Gorham, 1882)
- Enoclerus opitzi Rifkind, 2012
- Enoclerus ordinis Opitz, 2021
- Enoclerus pacificus Rifkind, 2002
- Enoclerus palmii (Schaeffer, 1904)
- Enoclerus para Opitz, 2021
- Enoclerus paula Opitz, 2021
- Enoclerus pedraazul Opitz, 2021
- Enoclerus peruvianus Pic, 1936
- Enoclerus philogenes Rifkind, 2017
- Enoclerus pictilis Opitz, 2021
- Enoclerus pictus Opitz, 2021
- Enoclerus pilatei (Chevrolat, 1874)
- Enoclerus pinus (Schaeffer, 1905)
- Enoclerus pisinnus Barr, 1978
- Enoclerus planonotatus (Castelnau, 1836)
- Enoclerus puellus Gorham, 1886
- Enoclerus puravida Rifkind, 1997
- Enoclerus pusio (Schenkling, 1906)
- Enoclerus quadriguttatus (Olivier, 1795)
- Enoclerus quadrinodosus (Chevrolat, 1874)
- Enoclerus quadrisignatus (Say, 1835)
- Enoclerus quercus (Schaeffer, 1905)
- Enoclerus reburrus Barr, 1978
- Enoclerus reductesignatus Rifkind, 2017
- Enoclerus regius Rifkind, 2002
- Enoclerus regnadkcin Rifkind, 2012
- Enoclerus rio Opitz, 2021
- Enoclerus riocuare Opitz, 2021
- Enoclerus rionegro Opitz, 2021
- Enoclerus rondonia Opitz, 2021
- Enoclerus rosmarus (Say, 1823)
- Enoclerus rubidus Opitz, 2021
- Enoclerus rubra Opitz, 2021
- Enoclerus ruficollis (Laporte de Castelnau, 1836)
- Enoclerus rufimanus (Schenkling, 1900)
- Enoclerus rufofemoratus (Schenkling, 1915)
- Enoclerus sagittarius Ekis, 1976
- Enoclerus salta Opitz, 2020
- Enoclerus salvini (Gorham, 1876)
- Enoclerus schaefferi Barr, 1947
- Enoclerus sericeus Ekis, 1976
- Enoclerus signifer Barr, 1978
- Enoclerus sinop Opitz, 2021
- Enoclerus skillmani Rifkind, 2012
- Enoclerus sphegeus (Fabricius, 1787) (red-bellied clerid)
- Enoclerus spinolae (LeConte 1853) (handsome yucca beetle)
- Enoclerus teutonia Opitz, 2021
- Enoclerus thomasi Opitz, 2020
- Enoclerus tigris Rifkind, 2002
- Enoclerus toledoi Rifkind, 2012
- Enoclerus torquatus (Chevrolat, 1874)
- Enoclerus tricinctus (Chevrolat, 1874)
- Enoclerus triplagiatus (Blanchard, 1843)
- Enoclerus tubercularis (Gorham, 1882)
- Enoclerus tucuman Opitz, 2021
- Enoclerus urbanus Rifkind, 2012
- Enoclerus valens Barr & Rifkind, 2009
- Enoclerus velha Opitz, 2021
- Enoclerus venator (Chevrolat, 1843)
- Enoclerus vera Opitz, 2021
- Enoclerus vernalis Barr & Rifkind, 2009
- Enoclerus versicolor (Laporte, 1836)
- Enoclerus vetus (Wolcott, 1927)
- Enoclerus viduus (Klug, 1842)
- Enoclerus villicus (Gorham, 1886)
- Enoclerus virginiensis (Schaeffer, 1917)
- Enoclerus vista Opitz, 2021
- Enoclerus vulnus Ekis, 1976
- Enoclerus wappesi Opitz, 2021
- Enoclerus whiteheadi Ekis, 1976
- Enoclerus x-album (Gorham, 1883)
- Enoclerus yasuni Opitz, 2021
- Enoclerus yungas Opitz, 2021
- Enoclerus zebra (Chevrolat, 1843)
- Enoclerus zebroides Barr, 1976
- Enoclerus zip Rifkind, 2017
- Enoclerus zonatus (Klug, 1842)
