= Enoclerus lecontei =

Scientific classification
- Kingdom: Animalia
- Phylum: Arthropoda
- Class: Insecta
- Order: Coleoptera
- Suborder: Polyphaga
- Infraorder: Cucujiformia
- Family: Cleridae
- Genus: Enoclerus
- Species: E. lecontei

Binomial name
- Enoclerus lecontei (Wolcott, 1910)

Synonyms
- Priocera lecontei Wolcott, 1910

Species of beetle

Enoclerus lecontei, the blackbellied clerid, is a species of checkered beetle in the family Cleridae that is found in Central America and North America. It preys on bark beetles.
