= André Young (YouTuber) =

Brazilian YouTuber and video game developer

- Born: André Young Ferreira
- Occupations: YouTuber; biologist; video game developer; vlogger
- Known for: 9 Kings

YouTube information
- Channel: @Andrezitos
- Years active: 2013–present
- Genres: Gaming; comedy; Vlog; Biology

André Young Ferreira is a Brazilian YouTuber, biologist, former podcaster, and game developer. He is known for creating the YouTube channels "André Young" and "Andrezitos" and for being the founder of the publisher Sad Socket, a company that developed the games 9 Kings, Ending Tau, Seraph's Last Stand, and Gods of Sand.

== Career ==
=== 2017-2018: Initial Career ===
On September 6, 2017, Ferreira published his first video, still available to the public, on the André Young channel. The video blends biology, humor, and gameplay—characteristics that would remain and become the identity of his YouTube channel.

On July 3, 2018, he created "Game JaaJ", a game jam held on the platform. Game Jolt. The event gained popularity among developers and became an official event, with subsequent editions and awards. Currently, "Game JaaJ" is organized on the Itch.io platform by Sad Socket.

His first commercial project was 23 Miles Deep, a mobile game created in a period of 10 days.

=== 2022-2025: First well-received Games ===
In 2022, he published the game Seraph's Last Stand, inspired by the browser game Heli Attack 2 (2003). In the first few months after its release, the game sold over 30,000 copies. and was nominated the following year in the Best Brazilian Game category at the Coelho Awards.

His game 9 Kings was featured at the Latin American Games Showcase and has already sold over 400,000 copies on Steam in its release year.

=== Parallel projects ===
Ferreira is also the creator of the game development course Oficina Indie. The course teaches the C# programming language using the Unity graphics engine. It includes a game jam called Oficina Jam, where students create their own games and compete against each other.

André Young, along with other collaborators, created an amateur podcast called Valdir Podcast, which aired between 2018 and 2020. The episodes were hosted in Soundcloud by André and two friends and covered a variety of topics with a humorous tone.
