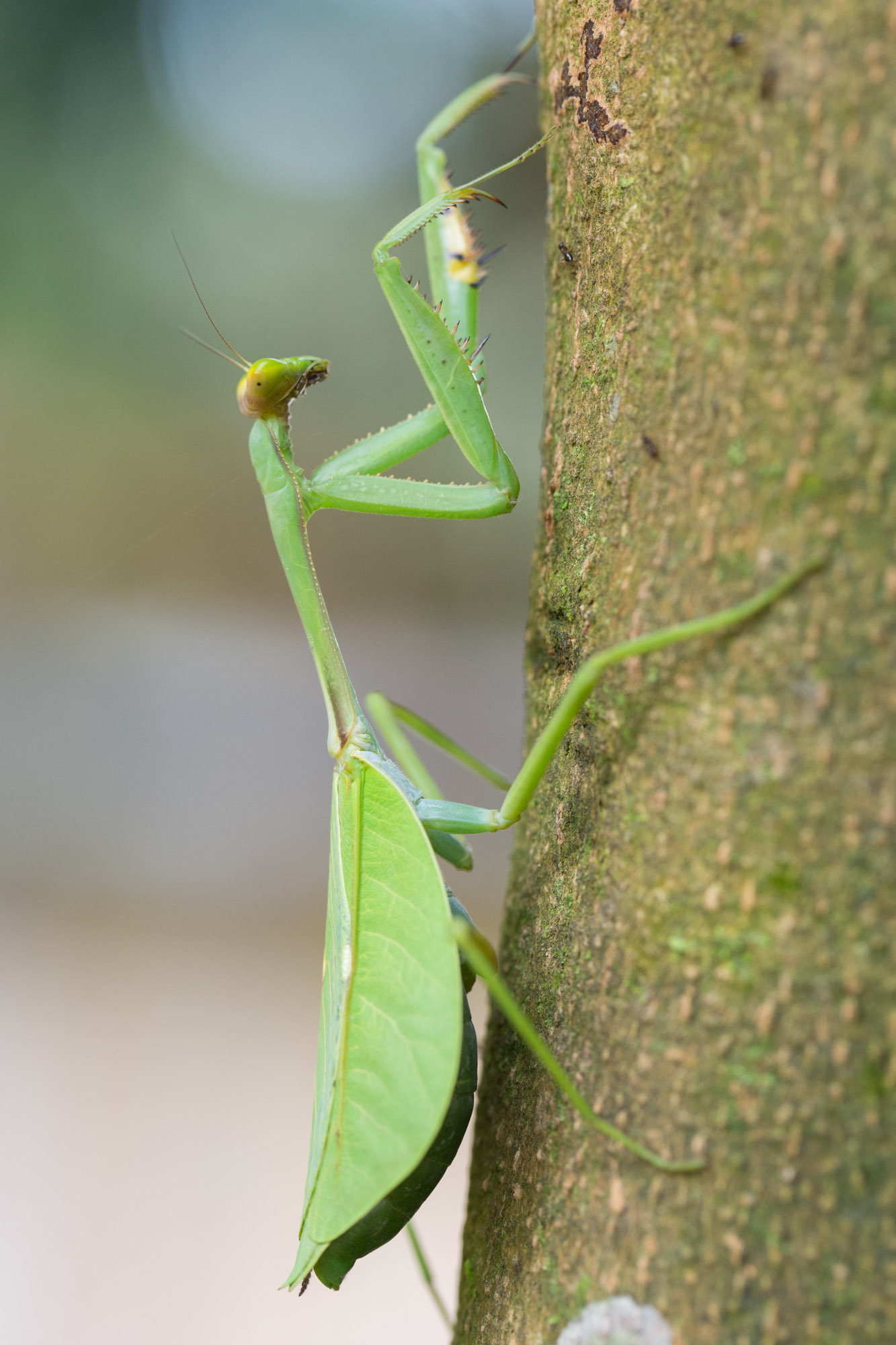
- Pseudoxyops perpulchra

Scientific classification
- Kingdom: Animalia
- Phylum: Arthropoda
- Clade: Pancrustacea
- Class: Insecta
- Order: Mantodea
- Family: Mantidae
- Subfamily: Vatinae
- Genus: Pseudoxyops

Species
- Pseudoxyops boliviana; Pseudoxyops borellii; Pseudoxyops diluta; Pseudoxyops minuta; Pseudoxyops perpulchra

= Pseudoxyops =

Genus of praying mantises

Pseudoxyops is a genus consisting of 5 species of mantises in the subfamily Vatinae. All of its species are endemic to South America.

== Species ==
- Pseudoxyops boliviana Giglio-Tos, 1914
- Pseudoxyops borellii Giglio-Tos, 1897
- Pseudoxyops diluta Stoll, 1813
- Pseudoxyops minuta Giglio-Tos, 1914
- Pseudoxyops perpulchra Westwood, 1889 (South American Broadwing Mantis)

== See also ==
- List of mantis genera and species
