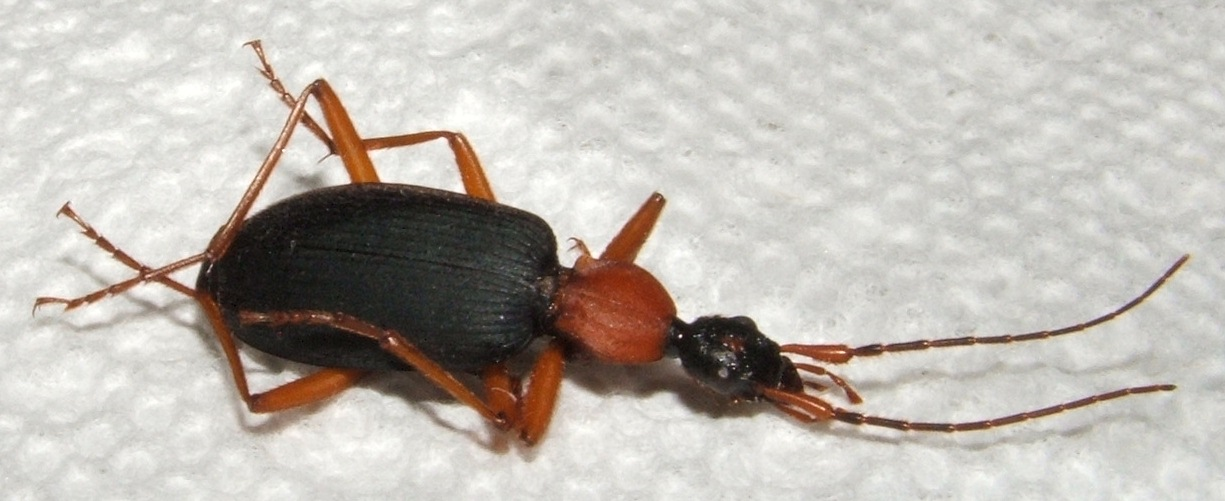
- A killed specimen

Scientific classification
- Domain: Eukaryota
- Kingdom: Animalia
- Phylum: Arthropoda
- Class: Insecta
- Order: Coleoptera
- Suborder: Adephaga
- Family: Carabidae
- Subfamily: Harpalinae
- Genus: Galerita
- Species: G. bicolor

Binomial name
- Galerita bicolor Drury, 1773

= Galerita bicolor =

Species of beetle

Galerita bicolor, also known as the False bombardier beetle, is a species of beetle occurring in the eastern United States. Its mimicry of the colors and shape of a bombardier beetle help it evade predators.

== Geographical range ==
G. bicolor is found from New York to Florida, and west to South Dakota and Texas.

== Description ==
G. bicolor is generally about 17.0-22.5 mm in length. It is large and elongated, with a bicolor scheme (red and black). The head is narrow and smaller than the body. The elytra is black, and ridged, with setae over the basal third. Its antennae are pale and somewhat wider than the rest at the base. Pronotum red.

== Biology ==
G. bicolor can be found under bark year-round. The larvae resemble the larvae of actual bombardier beetles to an extent. Not much is known about them. Though they are not bombardier beetles themselves, they can still emit a foul odor (just not as bad as the beetles they mimic). Females produce purse-shaped mud cells under leaves. Eggs are laid here. They are fond of moist areas, which can include woodlands, meadows, and backyards. They are usually encountered either dead or under leaf litter or a rock or log. In the wild, they can live about 1-2 years. They are most active from February-November. They eat insects as larvae and adults, and are mainly hunted by birds.
