= Kingdoms and Castles =

2017 video game

- Developer: Lion Shield
- Publisher: Lion Shield (Note: Console versions published by BlitWorks.)
- Platforms: Linux; macOS; Windows; Xbox One; Xbox Series X/S; PlayStation 4; PlayStation 5
- Release: Linux, macOS, Windows; July 20, 2017; Xbox One, Xbox Series X/S; December 1, 2023; PlayStation 4, PlayStation 5; March 21, 2024
- Genre: City-builder
- Mode: Single-player

Kingdoms and Castles is a city-building video game developed by Lion Shield and released on July 20, 2017, for Linux, macOS, and Windows. In the game, players build and expand a medieval town while defending it from dragons and vikings. The game received mixed to average reviews on release.

== Gameplay ==
Kingdoms and Castles is a city-building game in a medieval setting. Players begin by placing down a castle on one of the game's land masses, strategically placing it next to resources such as fertile land or iron deposits. The player has a limited number of peasants who perform jobs such as farming, building and collecting lumber. They can increase their number of peasants by building more homes. The peasants must be fed, which can be accomplished by building farms and granaries that store the food. Other buildings include foresters who cut and replant trees for lumber and quarries that can collect stone used to build larger homes. As the player progresses, they can begin taxing their peasants for gold, which can be used to pay workers and unlock new types of buildings.

Disasters periodically happen in the kingdom, such as an annual winter that destroys crops, lightning strikes that cause fires, and infectious plagues. Occasionally, enemies such as dragons, vikings and ogres will attack the kingdom. The player must construct defenses and recruit soldiers to fight off these threats.

Players can, if enabled, interact with AI kingdoms via diplomats. They can choose to ally and trade goods with them, or to expand their holdings through war.

== Development ==
Kingdoms and Castles was developed by Lion Shield. It was inspired by SimCity, Banished and Stronghold. The game was supported via the crowdfunding website Fig. It made over US$108,000 with an original goal of $15,000.

The game was released for Linux, macOS, and Windows on July 20, 2017. Published by BlitWorks, the console versions were released for Xbox One and Xbox Series X/S on December 1, 2023, and for PlayStation 4 and PlayStation 5 on March 21, 2024.

== Reception ==
According to the review aggregator website Metacritic, Kingdoms and Castles received "mixed or average reviews". Rock Paper Shotgun praised the artstyle, and felt as though gameplay was less complex than that of other city-building games. PC Gamer enjoyed watching buildings be constructed, and considered the game to lack significant "depth", but overall felt as though it was "perfectly enjoyable". Kotaku said that he was "hooked" on constructing buildings, and felt as though it traded accessibility for complexity.
