= Volodymyr Yezhov =

Ukrainian video game developer (1984–2022)

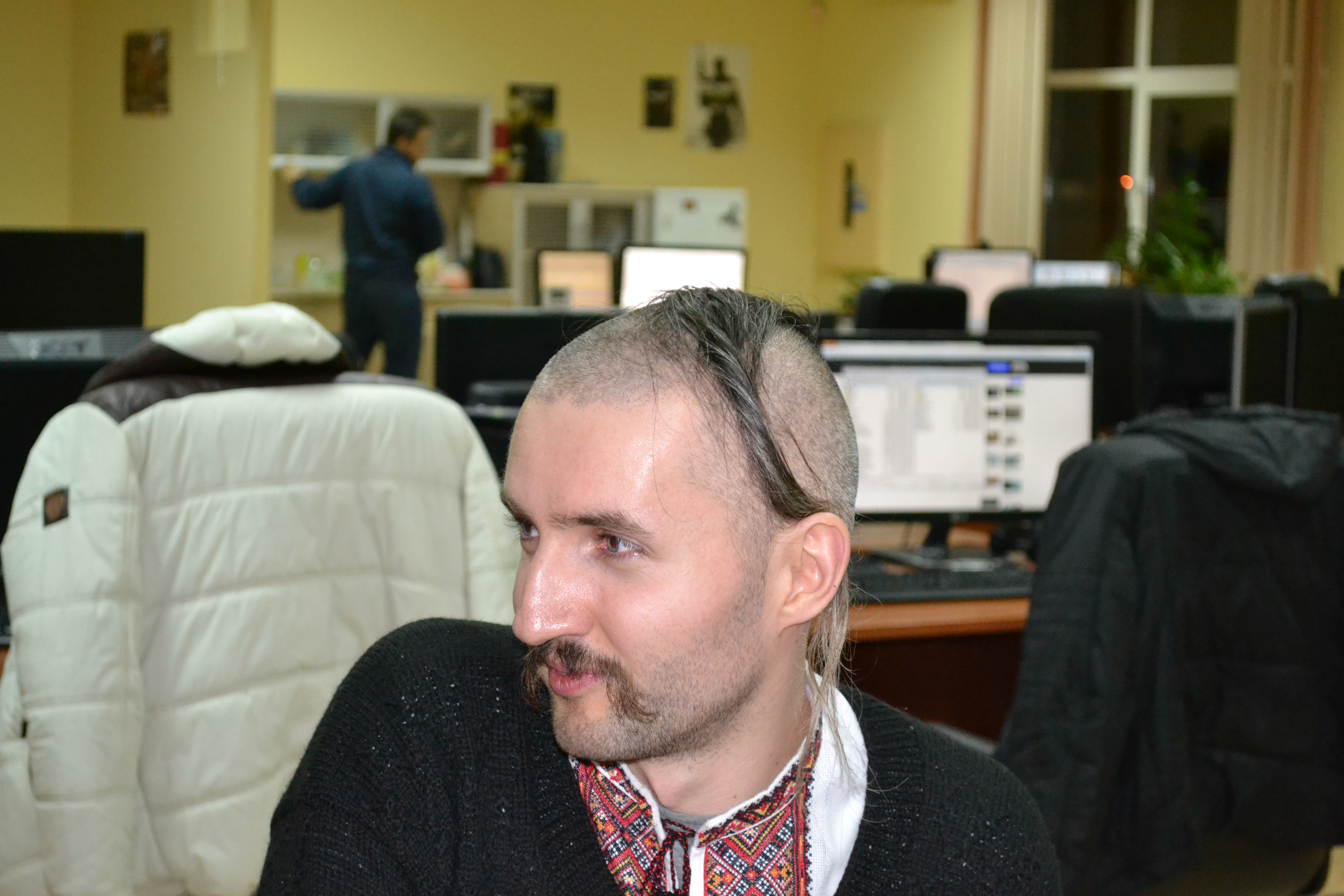
Volodymyr Yezhov

Volodymyr Anatoliyovych Yezhov (known by the nickname "Fresh"; August 1, 1984, Lubny — December 22, 2022, Bakhmut) was a Ukrainian video game developer, game designer and later a soldier. He was one of the developers of the game S.T.A.L.K.E.R. He participated in the defence of Ukraine against the Russian invasion and died during the Battle of Bakhmut.

== Early life ==
Yezhov graduated from Kyiv Polytechnic Institute with a degree in electronics engineering.

== Career ==
Until 2007, Yezhov worked as a game designer at GSC Game World. He participated in the creation of games such as S.T.A.L.K.E.R., Clear Sky, Cossacks, World of Battles: Morningstar, Call of Cthulhu and Sherlock Holmes: Devil's Daughter. In S.T.A.L.K.E.R.: Call of Pripyat, Yezhov used his own face for the leader of the Freedom faction, Loki. He had two sons.

Starting from February 24, 2022, he defended Kyiv as a volunteer in UVO company, formed by veterans of the Organisation of Ukrainian Nationalists Battalion on the eve of the Russian invasion.

On December 22, 2022, Yezhov was killed during the Battle of Bakhmut. On December 27 that year, a farewell ceremony was held for Yezhov in the Volodymyr Cathedral with the participation of a military guard. He was buried in the Forest Cemetery in Kyiv.

The documentary movie War Game: The Making of S.T.A.L.K.E.R. 2 is dedicated to the designer of the original S.T.A.L.K.E.R. Volodymyr Yezhov, voice actor Oleksiy Khilsky and other fallen defenders of Ukraine.
