= S.T.A.L.K.E.R. 2: Heart of Chornobyl =

2024 video game

- Developer: GSC Game World
- Publisher: GSC Game World
- Directors: Ievgen Grygorovych; Mariia Grygorovych
- Producer: Slava Lukyanenka
- Designer: Yurii Sydorenko
- Artists: Robert Koskor; Tymur Suleiman
- Writers: Yaroslav Kravchenko; Ivan Ponomarev
- Composers: Yaroslav Odryn; Andrew Luchanko; Kyrylo Borisov
- Series: S.T.A.L.K.E.R.
- Engine: Unreal Engine 5
- Platforms: Windows; Xbox Series X/S; PlayStation 5
- Release: Windows, Xbox Series X/S; 20 November 2024; PlayStation 5; 20 November 2025
- Genre: First-person shooter
- Mode: Single-player

S.T.A.L.K.E.R. 2: Heart of Chornobyl (Ukrainian: S.T.A.L.K.E.R. 2: Серце Чорнобиля, romanized: S.T.A.L.K.E.R. 2: Sertse Chornobylia) is a 2024 first-person shooter video game developed and published by GSC Game World. It is the fourth main game released in the S.T.A.L.K.E.R. video game series, as well as the first S.T.A.L.K.E.R. game in 15 years since the release of Call of Pripyat in 2009.

Initially announced following the release of Call of Pripyat, S.T.A.L.K.E.R. 2 was planned to release in 2012, before it was ultimately cancelled on the year of its intended release. The game resurfaced years later in 2018, with the development restarted and powered by Unreal Engine 5. It was scheduled to release for Windows and Xbox Series X/S on 8 December 2022, but due to the Russian invasion of Ukraine, development for the game was put on hold.

Following multiple delays, S.T.A.L.K.E.R. 2: Heart of Chornobyl was released on 20 November 2024. One million copies were sold within two days of its release, with the game receiving mixed reviews. A PlayStation 5 version of the game was released on 20 November 2025.

== Gameplay ==
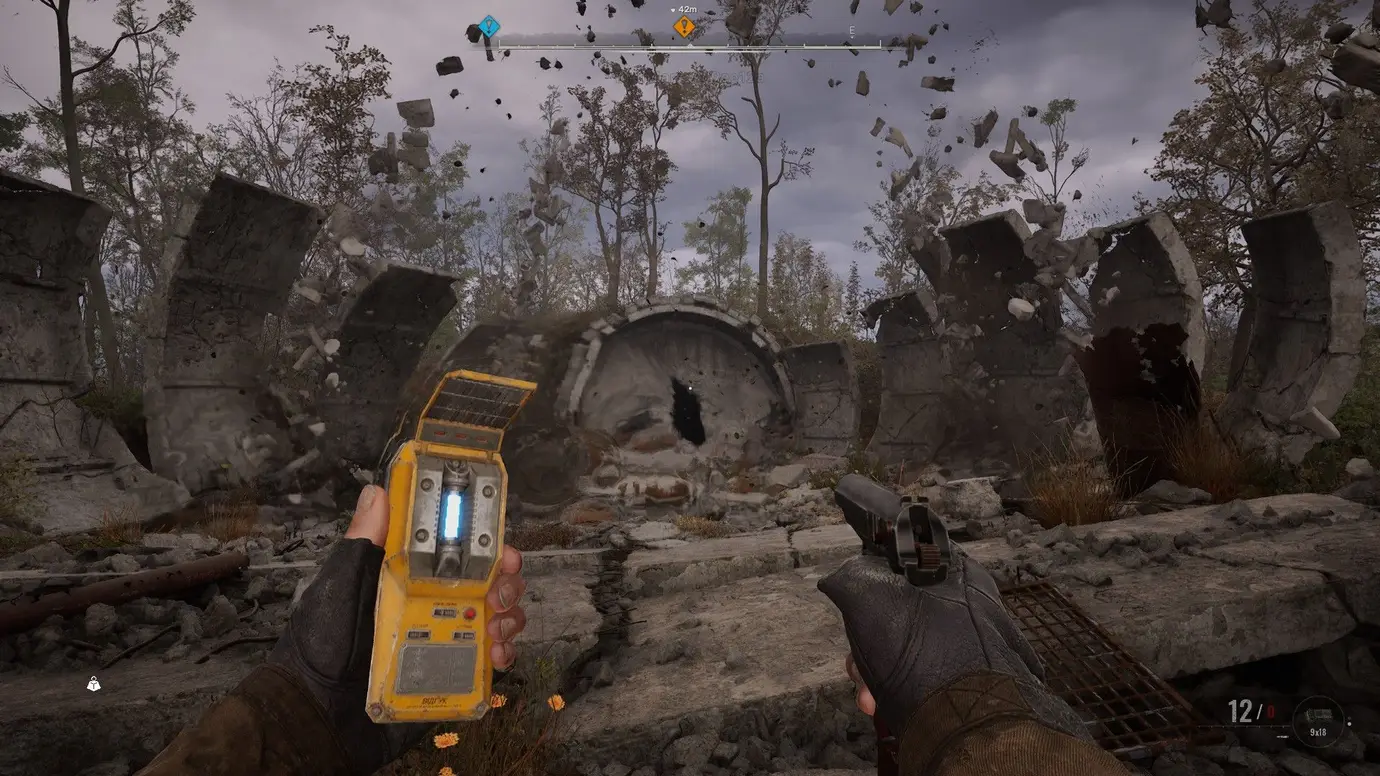
Screenshot of the game, showing the player encountering an anomaly

S.T.A.L.K.E.R. 2: Heart of Chornobyl is a first-person shooter with survival horror elements. It takes place in the post-apocalyptic Chernobyl exclusion zone around the Chernobyl Nuclear Power Plant. The game world is divided into several territories, some of which are initially inaccessible.

The player survives in the Zone by monitoring numerous indicators such as hunger and sleep, ignoring which will lead to exhaustion and death. They can collect and store various items in their inventory, but there is a limit to the weight carried. The items include medicines, food, weapons, ammo, and armor. At the same time, armor and weapons gradually wear out. The player also has a PDA in which they can view the Zone's map and place marks, track and switch between tasks, and read found notes.

In the Zone there are anomalies – dangerous formations that injure or kill on contact. The player can "probe" their boundaries by throwing bolts in the anomalies, by using special detectors "artifacts" are able to be found – valuable items that can be worn by the player, which can emit both useful and harmful effects.

In stalker camps the player can find traders, technicians and medics, who can provide services. Also present are areas to rest, and crates that allow the player to store items.

== Plot ==
Yevhen "Skif" Martynenko, a veteran of the Ukrainian Marine Corps, has returned from a 3-year deployment in an unspecified conflict. He awakens to find his apartment has been destroyed by an anomaly that has mysteriously appeared outside of the Zone, leaving an unknown artifact in its wake. Looking to earn money for a new home, he is smuggled into the Zone by a scientist, Professor Hermann, along with a piece of technology called the 'Scanner' that creates local anomalies and can apparently "recharge" depleted artifacts. Venturing into the Zone, he finds his initial team he was to make contact with have been killed and sets out alone to use the Scanner in special coordinates where it works. On the third and successful attempt, he is interrupted by an investigation from soldiers of the faction called 'Ward', dedicated to controlling the Zone and stopping its expansion. The soldiers themselves are killed by an unknown third party, who steal Skif's belongings and knock him unconscious.

Skif awakens and sets out to recover the Scanner and artifact, aided by a friendly loner named Richter. He finds himself on the trail of Solder, who sold him and the scientists the coordinates of where to place the Scanner, collaborating with either the local Stalkers or the Ward in the process. Following the trail, he is led to Scar, the protagonist of S.T.A.L.K.E.R.: Clear Sky, who leads an anarchistic faction called Spark that opposes the Ward and believes the Zone can be transformed into a utopian 'Shining Zone', as well as the Noontide faction, consisting of the formerly-brainwashed soldiers of the Monolith from previous games, who seek to make their own lives, having no memory of their pre-zone life or enslavement to the Monolith. They are divided between Strider, who aims to make the Zone a safer place, and Faust, who still preaches the original mindset of the Monolith.

Skif is led to SIRCAA, a scientific base and benefactors of the Ward, who are now in control of the Wishgranter, or Monolith itself, a powerful psychic hologram generator that brainwashed the Monolith soldiers, which SIRCAA aims to use to reshape the Zone in their image. Regardless of whether Skif collaborates with or conspires against SIRCAA, the Wishgranter is ultimately reactivated and all members of Noontide return to their brainwashed state.

Skif manages to reclaim his original Scanner, in the process meeting Doc, a member of Strelok's crew from the original Shadow of Chernobyl, who confesses to being a member of the scientists that formed the C-Consciousness and the Zone itself, having backed out of entering the pod to join the hivemind years ago. Strelok himself has become a conservative fanatic of the Zone, believing it needs to be protected and preserved from the rest of the world.

Skif goes to war against the reformed Monolith, confronting Faust amongst the Duga radar. Faust displays powerful psychic abilities (similar to the Controller mutant), and seemingly shows Skif the world in 'subtle matter', a pure psychic form through which dead human beings still live as consciousness. Faust apparently accepts defeat and dies.

Skif is led towards the heart of the Zone and the final remaining pod of the C-Consciousness, which will allow the Zone to be reshaped once more in the image of the one who enters it. Depending on his choices of allegiance, there are four endings.

- If Skif sides with the Ward, the loyal Colonel Korshunov enters the pod, and the Zone ceases expansion with SIRCAA gaining control of its energy and potential. Skif rejects their offer of a high-ranking military position and simply takes a replacement home, apathetic to the motivations and power of SIRCAA. This is the only ending where Skif leaves the Zone.
- Siding with Spark, the eccentric Scar enters the pod and Skif finds himself among grass and flowers in sunlight, sitting at a fire and reuniting with friends alive and dead, sharing in the joy at finding the utopian Shining Zone, but it is revealed that this is yet another psychic illusion, and the Stalkers have simply become catatonic and entranced in an unchanged Zone in reality, ignored by the mutants passing by.
- Siding with Strelok, he enters the pod and takes control of the Monolith, ordering them to stand down and letting Skif leave the area peacefully. The Zone's expansion seems to stop, but a barrier has been created, preventing anyone from entering or leaving the Zone, damning Skif and all other Stalkers to isolation and potential death.
- If Skif follows the advice of Doc, Skif enters the pod on his own, apparently free of corrupt motives. The Zone is 'set free', and anomalies spread across the entirety of the planet, the Zone now encompassing Earth. Doc himself appears to transform into Faust, who walks away into the Zone, having accomplished his mission.

== Development ==
=== Early development ===
S.T.A.L.K.E.R. 2 was initially announced in 2010, with a release date set in 2012, by Sergiy Grygorovych, CEO of GSC Game World, stating "After the official sales of the series exceeded 4 million copies worldwide, we had no doubts left to start creating a new big game in the S.T.A.L.K.E.R. universe. This will be the next chapter of the mega-popular game players expect from us." The development of the game was ambitious; it was stated that the game would feature an all-new multiplatform engine, made from scratch to fit S.T.A.L.K.E.R. 2.

Numerous layoffs and overall attrition during the development of the game had shrunk GSC's employee count by 75%. Two years in, Grygorovych had announced the immediate cessation of all development due to "personal reasons", likely as a result of financial difficulty. GSC Game World was officially dissolved on December 9, 2011. The official Twitter account posted, "We will do our best to continue. However, at this moment, nothing is certain." After several months of uncertainty, an update was posted that the development would continue after the holidays, although it would require funding. However, the cancellation of this build of S.T.A.L.K.E.R. 2 had been formally announced in April 2012 on the company's Facebook page, officially stated to have resulted from dispute between investors, staff, and the original IP rights owner.

=== Revival ===
After years of dormancy, GSC Game World was officially reformed in December 2014 to develop Cossacks 3. Four years later, on said game's Facebook page, development of a new S.T.A.L.K.E.R. 2 was announced, linking to www.stalker2.com, the game's website. It was later revealed that the game would be developed using Unreal Engine 4. This build of S.T.A.L.K.E.R. 2 was announced exceptionally early into development, with it still being in the "design doc phase". Grygorovych later stated on a podcast that the intent of the project's announcement in 2018 was largely to generate hype, in order to strike a publishing deal at E3 2018.

Little information was given regarding the project until E3 2021, where a full gameplay trailer was shown at the Microsoft/Bethesda press conference. The release date was rescheduled to April 28, 2022. In August 2021, the developers revealed that the game was updated to Unreal Engine 5.

=== Russian invasion of Ukraine ===
Near the outbreak of the Russian invasion of Ukraine, GSC, based in Kyiv, released a video on their YouTube account which called for financial aid for the Ukrainian Armed Forces, stating that the outbreak of the war and the need to protect GSC employees has led to the game's development being paused indefinitely. This was also followed by a Twitter post which linked to an account to donate to the Ukrainian military and stated "through pain, death, war, fear, and inhuman cruelty, Ukraine will persevere. As it always does". The game's subtitle was changed to "Heart of Chornobyl", reflecting the native Ukrainian romanisation rather than the Russian form. GSC stated in a development diary that the game's development was continuing despite some of the team fleeing their homes or joining the Armed Forces of Ukraine. Russian dubbing in the game was removed during development, leaving only English and Ukrainian.

In March 2023, GSC said they had been enduring constant cyberattacks for more than a year and anticipated that there could be leaks in the future. In June, GSC announced that hackers had leaked an internal test build to the public.

In May 2022, the development team stated on their official Discord server that the development process continued, and the game was scheduled to release in early 2024. It was delayed again, for further polishing, with a release date of 5 September 2024. It was delayed for the final time in July 2024.

== Release ==
The game was announced to be on Xbox Game Pass from launch. In addition, the game was released as a Microsoft-exclusive release, only releasing on Microsoft Windows and the Xbox Series X/S. This exclusivity, however, was only slated to be for three months following its release, as evidenced from leaked documents as a part of Epic Games v. Apple.

An expansion titled Cost Of Hope released on 20 August 2026. It introduced new areas: the Chornobyl Nuclear Power Plant, the Iron Forest, Lymansk, and an explorable portion of the SIRCAA facility. The expansion sees players navigating a conflict between notable factions, Freedom and Duty, after the treaty holding back hostilities breaks down. Cost of Hope, alongside future expansions for the game, will form a "trilogy".

== Reception ==
=== Critical response ===
Reception

Aggregate score
Aggregator	Score
Metacritic	(PC) 73/100 (XSXS) 73/100

S.T.A.L.K.E.R. 2: Heart of Chornobyl received "mixed or average" reviews from critics, according to review aggregator website Metacritic. The game was subject to numerous technical issues; upon the game's launch, GSC Game World announced in a statement that they were committed to fixing the issues.

It was reported that individuals based in Russia were bribing others to leave negative reviews on Steam and TikTok. In 2025, GSC Game World was declared an "undesirable organization" in Russia.

=== Sales ===
S.T.A.L.K.E.R. 2: Heart of Chornobyl sold one million copies within 48 hours of its release. By 4 March 2025, less than four months after its release, the game had surpassed six million players.

=== Accolades ===
Year	Ceremony	Category	Result	Ref.
2024	The Steam Awards	Game of the Year	Nominated	
2024	The Steam Awards	Most Innovative Gameplay	Nominated	
2024	The Steam Awards	Outstanding Story-Rich Game	Nominated	
2026	22nd British Academy Games Awards	Game Beyond Entertainment	Nominated	
