= S.T.A.L.K.E.R.: Shadow of Chernobyl =

2007 video game

- Developer: GSC Game World
- Publishers: WW: THQ; UKR: GSC World Publishing
- Directors: Andrii Prokhorov; Anton Bolshakov
- Producer: Anton Bolshakov
- Designer: Oleksii Sytianov
- Programmers: Oles Shyshkovtsov; Oleksandr Maksymchuk; Dmytro Iasieniev; Andrii Kolomiiets
- Artist: Andrii Prokhorov
- Writer: Oleksii Sytianov
- Composer: Vladimir "MoozE" Frey
- Series: S.T.A.L.K.E.R.
- Engine: X-Ray Engine
- Platforms: Microsoft Windows; PlayStation 4; Xbox One; Nintendo Switch; PlayStation 5; Xbox Series X/S
- Release: Microsoft Windows: NA: 20 March 2007; AU: 22 March 2007; EU: 23 March 2007; PS4, Xbox One: WW: 6 March 2024; Nintendo Switch: WW: 31 October 2024; PS5, Xbox Series X/S: WW: 20 May 2025
- Genre: First-person shooter
- Modes: Single-player, multiplayer

S.T.A.L.K.E.R.: Shadow of Chernobyl (titled S.T.A.L.K.E.R.: Shadow of Chornobyl on consoles) is a first-person shooter video game developed by GSC Game World and published by THQ in 2007 following a long development. It is the first game in the S.T.A.L.K.E.R. franchise, set in an alternate reality where a second disaster of mysterious origin occurred at the Chernobyl exclusion zone, which further contaminated the surrounding area with radiation, and caused strange otherworldly changes in local fauna, flora, and the laws of physics. The background and some of the terminology of the game are borrowed from the 1971 novella Roadside Picnic and its 1979 film adaptation Stalker.

The game features a non-linear storyline with 7 different endings and includes role-playing gameplay elements such as trading and two-way communication with non-player characters. In the game, the player assumes the identity of the Marked One, an amnesiac man trying to find and kill the mysterious Strelok within the exclusion zone, a forbidden territory surrounding the Chernobyl Nuclear Power Plant.

The game was met with praise for the atmosphere, style and depth, as well as the level design, but was criticized for numerous bugs. It was also a commercial success, selling over 2 million copies by September of 2008. A prequel, S.T.A.L.K.E.R.: Clear Sky, was released in 2008. A sequel, S.T.A.L.K.E.R.: Call of Pripyat, followed in 2009. A second sequel, S.T.A.L.K.E.R. 2: Heart of Chornobyl, was released in 2024. There are also multiple fan remakes trying to restore the cut content from the original version of the game.

== Setting ==
S.T.A.L.K.E.R. takes place in an area called the Zone. The Zone is based on the real-life Chernobyl exclusion zone and is also inspired by fictional works: Boris and Arkady Strugatsky's science fiction novella Roadside Picnic (1972) which was loosely adapted into Andrei Tarkovsky's film Stalker (1979), as well as the film's subsequent novelization by the Strugatsky brothers.

The Zone encompasses roughly 30 square kilometers and features a slice of the Chernobyl area extending south from Chernobyl Nuclear Power Plant; geographical changes for artistic license include moving the city of Pripyat into this area (it is actually to the north-west of the power station), although the city itself is directly modeled on its real-life counterpart, albeit smaller in size, and features in-game recreations of many actual locations from the city. The term Stalkers was also used for the scientists and engineers who explored the interior of the Chernobyl sarcophagus after its hasty construction in 1986. In addition, "the Zone" is also a term used to refer to the 30 kilometer exclusion zone around the power plant.

In the game's backstory, after the initial Chernobyl disaster, attempts were made to repopulate the area, primarily with scientists and military personnel. However, in 2006, almost 20 years after the first incident, a mysterious second disaster occurred, killing or mutating most of the inhabitants. S.T.A.L.K.E.R. begins years later, after people have begun coming to the Zone in search of money, valuable artifacts, and scientific information. In keeping with the post-nuclear decay within the Zone, extreme radiation has caused mutations among animals and plants in the area. As a result of the second disaster, the Zone is also littered with dangerous small areas of altered physics, known as anomalies. Explorers and scavengers operating within the Zone, known as Stalkers, possess an anomaly detector, which emits warning beeps of a varying frequency depending on their proximity to an anomaly.

== Gameplay ==
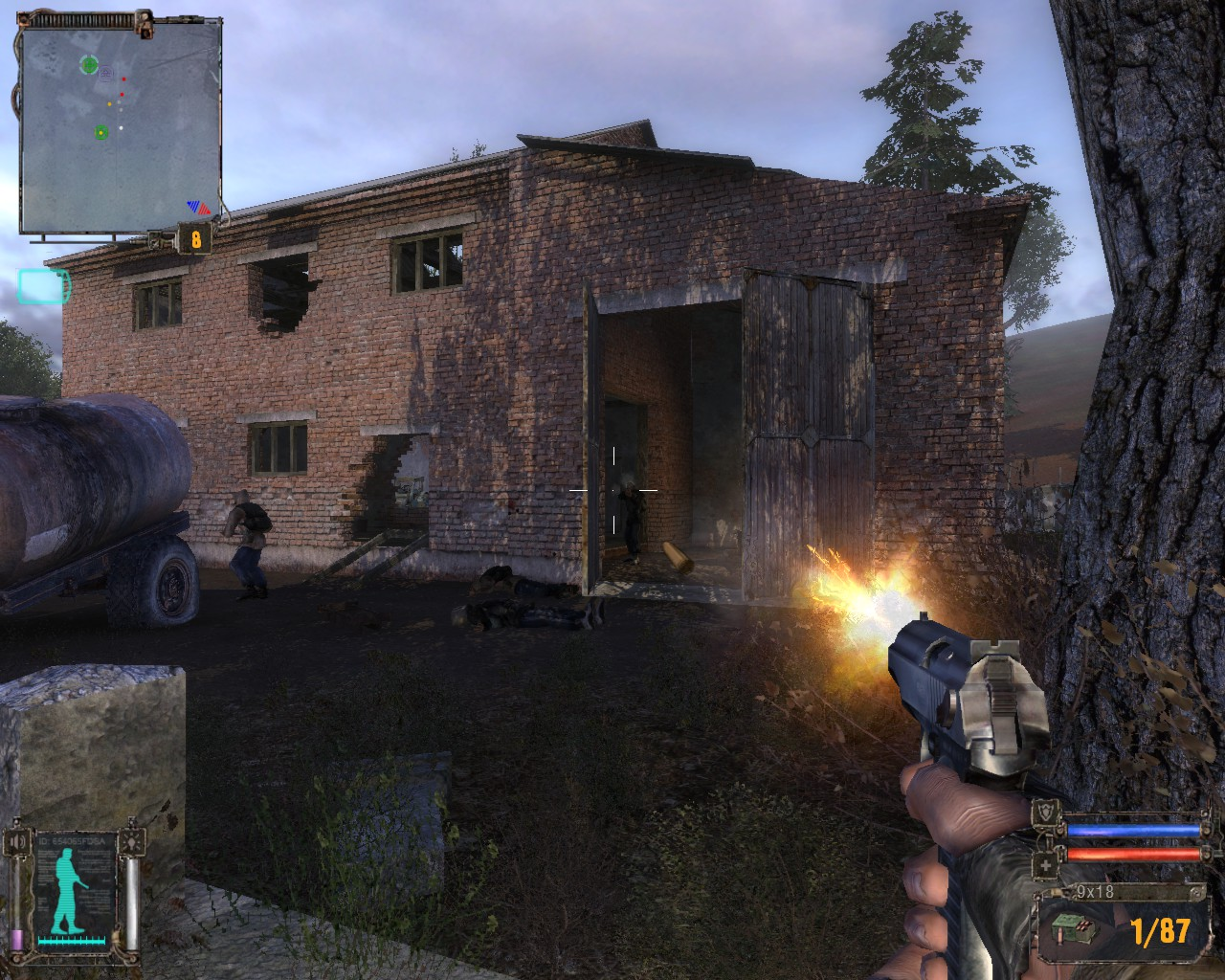
A screenshot of S.T.A.L.K.E.R.

S.T.A.L.K.E.R.: Shadow of Chernobyl is primarily a first-person shooter video game.

There are a large number of items in the game, so the player has customization choices which are constrained primarily by how much exploring they do. The game also attempts to blend the story and character interaction which are commonly associated with RPGs. However, conversation branches are extremely limited and do not significantly influence the course of the game, aside from accepting or declining missions.

The Zone itself is a large and varied area, consisting of wilderness, human settlements, and several heavily guarded military bases. However, the game world is not a true contiguous world, but rather 18 different maps separated by loading screens. Transfer from one area to another can only be accomplished at certain specific passageways; wire fences and extreme radiation levels block the player from attempting to cross the map in any other area.

Creatures within The Zone are vastly different from their real-world counterparts: dogs, boars, crows, and many more. Additionally, some areas contain mutated humans who have become affected by the so-called Brain Scorcher. Artificial intelligence of wildlife is highly developed and presents many realistic behaviors, such as fights over food and pack mentality, which can be observed in non-scripted events. The game engine was designed so that animal behavior is calculated even if the player is in a different part of the Zone.

There are several different variations of anomaly, each one having a unique impact upon those who cross its path. They can be potentially deadly to the player and the NPCs, delivering electric shocks, or pulling them into the air and crushing them. Most anomalies produce visible air or light distortions and their extent can be determined by throwing bolts (of which the player carries an infinite supply) to trigger them. Artifacts are found scattered throughout the Zone, often near clusters of anomalies. As well as being traded for money, a number of artifacts can be worn so that they provide certain benefits and detriments (for example, increasing a stalker's resistance to gunfire while also contaminating him with small amounts of radiation) although certain rarer artifacts provide benefits without any negative effects.

The game does not feature controllable vehicles (although vehicles are programmed in the game code, they are not available without the use of a third party modification, and even if added, they are not entirely stable, as a single knife slash can destroy it completely) and thus players are required to go from place to place on foot. A sprint option using a limited stamina bar can be used to temporarily increase the player's rate of movement, though this is reduced by the weight of objects the player is carrying, and weapons cannot be fired while sprinting. It is possible to sprint indefinitely by using artifacts and keeping below a certain weight limit (50 kg); however, it is impossible to sprint with certain weapons (e.g. RPG-7 and SVD).

Radioactive contamination caused by the nuclear incidents at Chernobyl occurs in specific invisible patches throughout the Zone. Although most areas are not contaminated, areas near abandoned construction equipment that was used in the post-accident clean-up, certain military vehicular wreckage and a variety of other locations create fields of radiation of varying intensity and size, some of which cannot be passed through without the proper protective equipment and anti-contaminant agents. The equipment is simplified into various sets of armor that have different levels of radiation protection. Additional radiation resistance may be conferred by some artifacts, and radiation sickness may be treated by medication or by consuming vodka.

When the player enters a highly irradiated area, they will begin to receive radiation poisoning. During this time, a radiation icon appears on the screen and fades through from green to yellow to red, signifying the strength of the poisoning, which grows the longer the player remains present in the affected areas. The stronger the poisoning, the faster the player's health decreases. Unless the player dies from damage caused by radiation poisoning, there are no permanent effects from contracting it other than health loss. However, radiation will persist and continue to drain health until either radiation medication or a substantial amount of vodka is consumed. Radiation can primarily be avoided by wearing certain artifacts that neutralize radiation or more advanced suits that will effectively protect the player from radiation.

In much the same way radiation works as a gameplay mechanic, the player will occasionally become hungry during their travels. During this state, an icon of a crossed fork and spoon will appear. Consuming in-game food items returns the player state from hungry to not hungry, which removes the negative impact on stamina that the hunger status gives. However, if one ignores eating, it will result in the death of the player in a certain amount of time.

As with radiation and hunger, bleeding is another state of detriment which the player must try to avoid or manage while playing the game. Bleeding occurs when the player sustains certain kinds of injuries of certain severity (such as being shot or stabbed). The player will lose the amount of health determined by the landed blow and will continue to lose small amounts of health as they hemorrhage. Bleeding can sometimes stop on its own, but the player can prevent further bleeding by applying bandages or using first aid kits, thereby preventing further health loss.

== Plot ==
Shadow of Chernobyl offers 7 different endings based on the player's actions. The ending below is considered canon in the series.

The game opens with lightning striking a vehicle, causing it to crash. The unnamed protagonist is the sole survivor, and regains consciousness in the bunker of a local black marketer named Sidorovich. He is suffering from amnesia, and has only two clues to his identity. The first is a tattoo of the acronym "S.T.A.L.K.E.R." on his arm and the second is a PDA with the entry "Kill Strelok". Sidorovich nicknames the protagonist the "Marked One". The Marked One performs several tasks for Sidorovich as payment for saving his life. Through these missions and new contacts, the player discovers clues to Strelok's possible location. These bring the Marked One deeper into the Zone and provide more details about Strelok and his companions.

To progress further into the Zone, the player must disable a psionic device known as the Miracle Machine. The machine emits frequencies which cause those within its range to lose their minds, becoming zombies. While disabling the device, the Marked One finds a clue that leads to Doc, a member of Strelok's team. A trap injures the player, who is then rescued by Doc. He tells the Marked One about a monolithic artifact known as the Wish Granter, located at the center of the Zone. This artifact is sought after by most of the Zone's denizens and is guarded by a cult-like paramilitary group called Monolith. Doc also implies that the Marked One is in fact Strelok, before departing.

The Marked One eventually identifies the Chernobyl Nuclear Power Plant (CNPP) in Pripyat as the location of the Wish Granter. A more powerful version of the Miracle Machine, known as the Brain Scorcher, blocks the path to the city. Once the device is disabled, the player can travel freely around Pripyat and enter the CNPP itself. However, several militant factions in the Zone, as well as the Security Service of Ukraine, take advantage of this event to enter Pripyat as well and battle for control of the city. The Marked One must fight his way through Monolith cultists and Ukrainian soldiers to reach the CNPP. Once inside the plant's irradiated sarcophagus, the player discovers the Wish Granter and a secret laboratory beneath it. Inside the lab is a computer terminal, where an entity known as the C-Consciousness resides.

The C-Consciousness reveals that the player character is Strelok, and provides an overview of the history of the Zone. After the Chernobyl disaster in 1986, the Soviet Union used the complete vacancy of the exclusion zone for unhindered psionic research purposes. This resulted in the development of various weaponized psychic devices. Seven scientists had their brains linked to a single neural network, creating a hivemind known as the C-Consciousness. Upon the dissolution of the Soviet Union five years later, the C-Consciousness took control of the Zone and continued the research. The hivemind attempted to create world peace through global mind control via directly interfering with the Noosphere, an invisible field of energy linked to human minds and thoughts, which it discovered in its research. This attempt failed and caused the anomalies and reality-warping nature of the Zone. To protect itself, the C-Consciousness set up the Miracle Machine, the Brain Scorcher, and Wish Granter. The Wish Granter brainwashes those who reach it, turning them into Monolith cultists programmed to defend the CNPP against further incursions.

The C-Consciousness offers Strelok the opportunity to link his consciousness to it and become part of the hivemind. The player can either accept this offer or attempt to stop the C-Consciousness. If Strelok rejects the offer, the hivemind teleports him away. Strelok becomes determined to reach the physical location of the C-Consciousness and destroy it. After fighting his way through large numbers of Monolith gunmen and mutants, Strelok stumbles upon the original seven Soviet scientists, in a state of suspended animation. He kills them, eliminating the C-Consciousness.

Afterwards, Strelok rests on the ground outside the CNPP, unsure if he made the right choice but relieved that his ordeal is finally over.

== Technical features ==
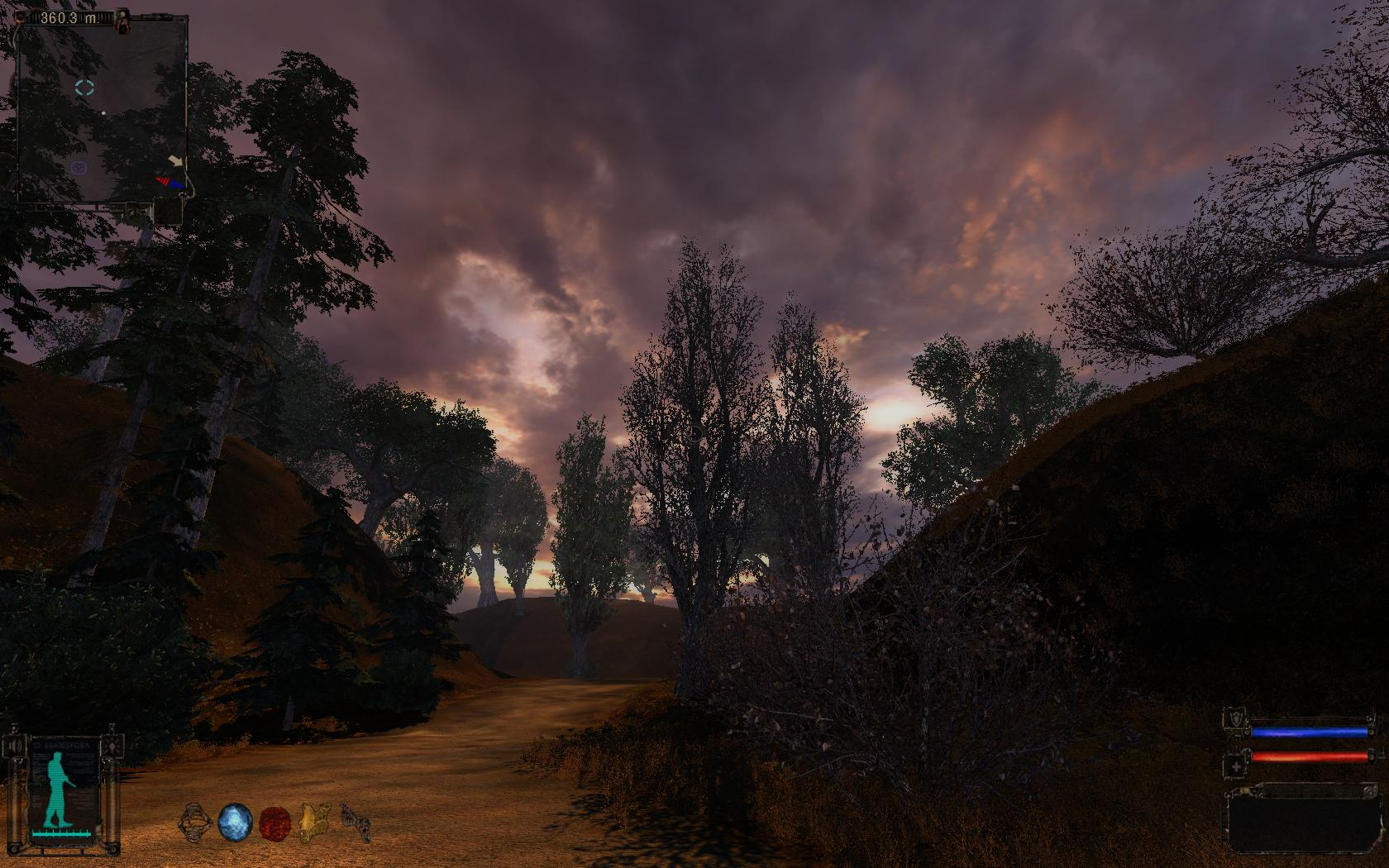
A screenshot demonstrating the abilities of S.T.A.L.K.E.R.'s rendering engine after enabling anti-aliasing and tone mapping

The X-Ray Engine is a Direct3D 8.1/9 Shader Model 3.0 graphics engine. Up to a million polygons can be on-screen at any one time. The engine features HDR rendering, parallax and normal mapping, soft shadows, motion blur, widescreen support, weather effects and day/night cycles. As with other engines that use deferred shading, the X-Ray Engine does not support multisample anti-aliasing with dynamic lighting enabled. However, a different form of anti-aliasing can be enabled with dynamic lighting which utilizes an edge detection algorithm to smooth edges between objects. The game takes place in a thirty square kilometer area, and both the outside and inside of this area are rendered to the same amount of detail. Some textures in the game were photographs of the walls in the developers' studio. As of patch 1.0003 the X-Ray Engine supports "surround screen" monitor setups, including a 16:9 native resolution ratio.

The X-Ray Engine is among the first of its kind to feature real time global illumination through a method called photon mapping, the GI system runs entirely through the CPU on one core and was first seen implemented in a beta build as early as 2004 however remained experimental through ShoC development most likely due to its massive performance hit.

The X-ray engine uses GSC Game World's proprietary ALife artificial intelligence engine. ALife supports more than one thousand characters inhabiting the Zone. These characters are non-scripted, meaning that AI life can be developed even when not in contact with the player. The NPCs have a full life cycle (task accomplishment, combat, rest, feeding and sleep) and the same applies to the many monsters living in the Zone (hunting, attacking stalkers and other monsters, resting, eating, sleeping). These monsters migrate in large groups. The non-scripted nature of the characters means that there are an unlimited number of random quests. For instance, rescuing stalkers from danger, destroying stalker renegades, protecting or attacking stalker camps or searching for treasure. The AI characters travel around the entire Zone as they see fit. Several attack tactics were cut for difficulty reasons, including the ability for enemies to heal wounded allies and give orders.

S.T.A.L.K.E.R. uses a heavily modified version of the ODE physics engine. Ragdoll physics, destructible objects, realistic bullet ballistics and skeletal animation can all be found in the game. Bullets are affected by gravity, bounced against solid surfaces at oblique angles, and firearms are highly inaccurate when fired without aiming. To score consistent hits at medium or long range, players must aim using the iron sights on their guns. Additionally, hit damage is pseudo-realistic, and the player can die after only being shot a few times (although later in the game various armor suits and artifacts can be acquired that increase the player's resistance to damage). Late-game depends heavily on scoped weaponry due to the well-armed and armored enemies that keep their distance from the player.

A weather system is integrated into various parts of the landscape and allows a variety of weather effects, such as sunshine, storms and showers. The weapons available, behavior of the AI, game tactics and ranking systems depend on the weather. Unlike most dynamic weather systems, the game features complete dynamic wet surfaces such as pavement, concrete, brick walls, etc.

The game features ambient music by Vladimir Frey aka "MoozE". It also has three songs from the Ukrainian band Firelake.

== Development and release ==
The game was first announced by GSC Game World in November 2001, as S.T.A.L.K.E.R.: Oblivion Lost, although it had been talked about as early as 2000. It had its release date, originally as summer 2003, pushed back several times. Meanwhile, hundreds of screenshots of the game had been released, as well as a dozen preview video clips, accompanied by other forms of promotion by GSC, such as inviting fans to their offices in Kyiv to play the current build of the game. However, due to the delays some considered S.T.A.L.K.E.R. to be vaporware.

In late December 2003, a pre-alpha build of the game was leaked to peer-to-peer file sharing networks. This build, marked as version 1096, inadvertently acted as a fully functional tech demo of S.T.A.L.K.E.R.'s engine, despite its lack of NPC enemies and fauna. After that, with the game missing the 2003 release date and still far from being finished, the publisher THQ sent Dean Sharpe (the later CEO of Metro developer 4A Games, which would be formed by some ex-members of GSC Game World who had worked on Shadow of Chernobyl) to oversee cutting many features and downsizing the overall scale and ambitions to save it from development hell, leaving much of it to be picked up in a sequel.

In February 2005, THQ expressed a desire to see the game released toward the end of its 2006 fiscal year (31 March 2006) but maintained that no release date had been set. In October 2005, THQ confirmed that S.T.A.L.K.E.R. would not be out "until the second half of THQ's 2007 fiscal year - October 2006 at the earliest." In February 2006, THQ revised this possible release window, saying the game would not be in stores until the first quarter of 2007. In an interview at the Russian Gameland Awards, PR Manager Oleg Yavorsky indicated that release was planned for September 2006. In 2006, the game came 9th in Wired's Vaporware '06 award.

In late February GSC managed to release a public beta. A multiplayer demo was released to the public on 15 March 2007. On 2 March 2007, it was announced that the game went gold.

In February 2009, due to popular demand GSC Game World released "xrCore" build 1935, dated 18 October 2004. It uses a completely different physics engine with many cut monsters, levels, and vehicles. It was also significantly larger than the retail release. It is however somewhat unstable, but features the full game along with a "fully functional ALife system". It is currently available for free download from the GSC servers and mirrors. Multiple other builds of the game have been since publicly released as well, along with design documents.

In 2022, a supposed console port build was leaked to the internet.

On March 6, 2024, GSC Game World released a bundle that includes all three games in the franchise for console platforms PlayStation 4, Xbox One and (through backwards compatibility) PlayStation 5 and Xbox Series.

On October 31, 2024, the game collection S.T.A.L.K.E.R.: Legends of the Zone Trilogy was released for the Nintendo Switch. The collection includes Shadow of Chornobyl, Clear Sky, and Call of Prypiat. Each title within the trilogy can be purchased separately or as part of the full collection.

== Reception ==
Reception

Aggregate score
Aggregator	Score
Metacritic	82/100

Review scores
Publication	Score
Eurogamer	8/10
Game Informer	8.25/10
GameSpot	8.5/10
GameSpy	3.5/5
IGN	8.2/10

=== Critical reception ===
S.T.A.L.K.E.R.: Shadow of Chernobyl received generally positive reviews, with critics praising the game for its style and depth while criticising technical issues, mentioning the number of bugs present. It received a score of 82.70% on GameRankings and 82/100 on Metacritic.

The game design of the Zone was one of the most favored aspects. GameSpot praised the style and level design, stating "This is a bleak game, but in a good way, as it captures its post apocalyptic setting perfectly", while Eurogamer called it "one of the scariest games on the PC", going on to say "Like the mythological Chernobyl zone it is based upon, this game is a treacherous, darkly beautiful terrain." Game Informer did not find the gameplay particularly innovative, but still complimented the basic FPS design, saying, "S.T.A.L.K.E.R. isn't the revolution that we all hoped it would be. It is, however, a respectable and sometimes excellent first-person adventure", whereas GameSpot called it "one of the best ballistics models ever seen in a game, and as a result, firefights feel authentic as you try and hit someone with what can be a wildly inaccurate rifle".

Upon release, S.T.A.L.K.E.R. was criticized for having numerous bugs, especially when used with the then-recently released Windows Vista. IGN found the game "tended to stutter quite often, sometimes pausing for three or four seconds at regular intervals, which occurred on two different Windows XP computers at maximum visual quality," and some cases of game crashing glitches. Another criticized aspect was the story, which to some reviewers was "incoherent" and which PC Gamer stated "fails in the specific story of your character".

=== Awards ===
S.T.A.L.K.E.R. won the Special Achievement award for Best Atmosphere in GameSpot's Best and Worst 2007, stating that "S.T.A.L.K.E.R. captures the 'ghost town' nature of the zone, from the abandoned cities to the overgrown wilderness. Then, the game adds its own paranormal elements, which help make a spooky environment almost terrifying at times."

=== Sales ===
S.T.A.L.K.E.R. received a "Silver" sales award from the Entertainment and Leisure Software Publishers Association (ELSPA), indicating sales of at least 100,000 copies in the United Kingdom. As of September 2008, S.T.A.L.K.E.R. has sold 2 million copies worldwide. GSC Game World CEO Sergiy Grygorovych has said "We are very pleased that S.T.A.L.K.E.R. became so popular among players from all over the world. Financial success will allow us to develop S.T.A.L.K.E.R. in different directions as a brand."

== Sequels ==
=== S.T.A.L.K.E.R.: Clear Sky ===
S.T.A.L.K.E.R.: Clear Sky is a prequel set eight months before Shadow of Chernobyl. The game world consists of a mix of old, redesigned areas and completely new levels. The updated engine supports the Inverse Kinematics animation system, allowing more and better animations. New effects such as volumetric lighting were also included. In general, the developers sought to take the basics of everything in Shadow of Chernobyl and enhance them. Better AI, graphics and new game-play additions, such as faction wars, were some of the added features.

=== S.T.A.L.K.E.R.: Call of Pripyat ===
S.T.A.L.K.E.R.: Call of Pripyat is a sequel set after the events in Shadow of Chernobyl. The game features new areas recreated by their true-to-life locales such as Pripyat town, Yanov Railway Station, Jupiter Factory, Kopachi Village and more. Other features include an improved A-Life system, a new player interface, a brand-new story and a number of unique characters, two new monsters and behavior and abilities, an extended system of side quests, a sleep function and a free play mode.

=== S.T.A.L.K.E.R.: Oblivion Lost restoration projects ===
In 2014, a mod aimed at restoring cancelled features from the early versions of the game was released as a standalone game titled S.T.A.L.K.E.R. - Lost Alpha, the development of which has since continued with Lost Alpha - Developer's Cut released in 2017. Rock, Paper, Shotgun's Craig Pearson praised many aspects of the 2014 version, but also noted the presence of stability problems and bugs.

=== S.T.A.L.K.E.R. 2: Heart of Chornobyl ===
A sequel, S.T.A.L.K.E.R. 2: Heart of Chornobyl, was released on November 20, 2024 using Unreal Engine 5. The sequel uses many of the characters from the original game, including the elusive Strelok.

=== S.T.A.L.K.E.R.: Anomaly ===
S.T.A.L.K.E.R.: Anomaly is a free fan made stand-alone mod that includes content from the three original S.T.A.L.K.E.R games and important features of the series like the A Life system while adding graphic and gameplay changes. Anomaly has led to other projects that add different mods to further customize the player experience like GAMMA, Escape From Prypiat, Anthology 2.0, and many more.
