= Screamer 4x4 =

2000 video game

- Developer: Clever's Games
- Publisher: Virgin Interactive
- Producer: László Német
- Designer: Gyula Pozsgay
- Platform: Microsoft Windows
- Release: EU: December 22, 2000; NA: December 3, 2001
- Genre: Racing
- Modes: Single player, Multiplayer

Screamer 4x4 is a 4x4 off-road game, developed by Hungarian-based Clever's Games and published by Virgin Interactive. It is the fourth game in the Screamer series. It is the first game in the series not developed by Milestone. It makes use of graphics hardware acceleration, allowing to choose between Glide, Direct3D and OpenGL renderers.

In North America, the game was part of a $20 budget range from Titus Interactive which was branded using the Virgin Interactive name alongside Original War, Codename: Outbreak and Nightstone.

== Reception ==
Reception

Aggregate scores
Aggregator	Score
GameRankings	74%
Metacritic	77/100

Review score
Publication	Score
GameSpot	7.6/10

Screamer 4x4 garnered generally positive reviews, and holds averages of 74% and 77/100 on aggregate websites GameRankings and Metacritic.

== See also ==
- Sim racing
- Off-roading trials
