= Cossacks II: Napoleonic Wars =

2005 video game

- European cover art
- Developer: GSC Game World
- Publisher: CDV Software
- Producer: Sergey Grygorovych
- Designers: Alexander Chuchkevich; Andrew Zavolokin
- Programmers: Andrew Shpagin; Andrii Frolov
- Artists: Ivan Khivrenko; Pavel Markevich
- Composer: Alexey Omelchuk
- Platform: Microsoft Windows
- Release: CIS: 4 April 2005; UK: 15 April 2005; NA: 26 April 2005
- Genre: Real-time strategy
- Modes: Single-player, multiplayer

Cossacks II: Napoleonic Wars (Ukrainian: Козаки ІІ: Наполеонівські війни) is a real-time strategy game and the second installment in the Cossacks series, released in 2005. This game focuses exclusively on the Napoleonic era, meaning it has a much shorter time span than others in this series, which spanned several centuries. Therefore, fewer technologies can be researched than in other Cossacks games, and there aren't as many different unit types for each country as before. On the other hand, Cossacks II allows a large number of units to be trained and it has many tactical options and an updated graphical engine.

== Gameplay ==
The Cossacks series has always been noted for having a large number of units on screen simultaneously, and that all are controllable at the same time; this game is no exception. The limit of soldiers that can be used at the same time is 64,000, a large number compared to other real-time strategy video games.

== Game modes ==
In the game, there are two different modes, single-player, and multi-player. In single player, three different modes may be played: campaign (tutorial), Battle for Europe (turn-based, much like Risk), and Skirmish/Historical Battles. In multiplayer, players can play a game over the internet.

=== Singleplayer ===
In Battle for Europe mode, 6 nations are playable: France, Russia, Prussia, Austria, Egypt, and Great Britain. With one of these, players attempt to conquer Europe. The 2006 expansion, Cossacks 2: Battle for Europe, also includes Spain, the Duchy of Warsaw and the Confederation of the Rhine.

Players have a single army to command, which can be ordered across Europe on a turn-based scale. Battles are fought in real time. Over time, player experience improves, depending on the number of battles fought. As promotions are earned, more units become available, and better ones may be unlocked. At first, only infantry can be used, then light infantry, engineers, and cavalry are allowed, followed by artillery, and finally elite infantry and cavalry.

In Skirmish mode, a map is chosen, and a fight begins in a real-time environment, reminiscent of Age of Empires II. The human player begins by choosing a country with which to play, and then attempts to defeat the computer player's nation, by trying to capture all of the villages on the map, or by destroying all of the enemy's town centers. To capture a village, one, sometimes two, group(s) of thirty militiamen must be destroyed.

In order to capture it, a group of men must be moved near the center of the village. Each village can collect one of the four resources: coal, iron, gold, and food. Peasants, or serfs, can collect wood and stone, which are stored in storehouses. Two extra map packs, one with three extra maps for skirmish mode, and one for historical battles, have been released for free download at the Cossacks II official website.

In the historical battles mode, a variety of historical battles may be fought. They are predesigned, which means no new units may be trained. A couple of the battles playable are the Battle of Austerlitz, and the Battle of Ulm.

There is also a map editor by holding 'Ctrl' and clicking on the main menu, where players can create and edit their own maps. Cossacks II also includes a gameplay mode called Battle for Europe in which players capture everything on the vast map of Europe that range from major cities, such as Moscow, Paris, and London, to smaller provinces such as Nantes and Toulouse that they must capture in order to gain experience. This in turn gives them access to more squads and more elite infantry to be able to capture the capital cities.

The players can move up in rank and experience levels every time they win some battles or skirmishes in this mode. For example, when they first start the game, they are a 1st Lieutenant. If on the first skirmish gain a victory, when they get to the battle report menu, it will tell them how much experience they gained and when they get past that there will be promotion and rewards messages and the players are likely to become a captain, etc.

=== Multiplayer ===
In multiplayer mode, players can play a skirmish battle over the internet.

Multiplayer games have to set up through a VPC (virtual private network) such as LogMeIn Hamachi. After connecting to a player made server a player may join another players server, but many bugs can be experienced while playing like this.

== Cossacks II: Battle for Europe ==
The Cossacks II: Battle for Europe expansion pack was released in June 2006. It is a stand-alone game, eliminating the need for the original version. Major changes to the game are to the Battle for Europe mode. At least 7 new provinces have been added to expand the map, in order to allow greater playability as well as to accommodate 3 new nations: Spain, the Duchy of Warsaw and the Confederation of the Rhine. A number of new historical battles were also added: Borodino, Leipzig and Waterloo, as well as campaigns played from the perspective of some of the great powers of the day.

== Reception ==
Reception

Aggregate scores
Aggregator	Score
GameRankings	73%
Metacritic	73%

Review scores
Publication	Score
GameSpot	7.9/10
GameSpy	2.5/5
IGN	7.7/10
Worthplaying	7.0/10

The game had received mixed reviews. Aggregators GameRankings and Metacritic gave it 73%. Peter Suciu of Game Spy had given the game an average of 2.5 out of 5, criticizing its complexity and limited multiplayer options. Steve Butts of IGN considered to be better than the original Cossacks and a substantial improvement over Alexander. Jason Ocampo of GameSpot gave it 7.9 out of 10, calling the game "enjoyable" and praising its colorful graphics, but mentioning about bugs and corrupt saves as an annoying distraction from it being "enjoyable".
