= American Conquest =

2002 video game

- Developer: GSC Game World
- Publisher: CDV Software Entertainment
- Platform: Microsoft Windows
- Release: EU: 15 November 2002; NA: 6 February 2003
- Genre: Real-time strategy
- Modes: Single-player, multiplayer

American Conquest (Ukrainian: Завоювання Америки) is a real-time strategy video game developed by GSC Game World and published by CDV Software Entertainment. It is set between the 15th and the early 19th centuries in the American continents. There is also an expansion pack produced for American Conquest, called American Conquest: Fight Back and a gold edition, which has both the original and expansion pack bundled together. The latest installment in the series is American Conquest: Divided Nation. All three titles are available together as the American Conquest Chronicles.

== Gameplay ==
American Conquest's basic gameplay mechanics and economic factors are shared with the earlier GSC Game World title Cossacks: European Wars and its add-ons. As in Cossacks, American Conquest allows the building of a base with which the player will conduct military and economic activities to prepare for victory in a scenario.

While the difference between playing for the European factions and the Native Americans are discernible in terms of military strategy, the basics are the same. The usual chain of activities involve building dwellings for peasant workforce and to gather resources like wood, food, and gold, stone, coal and iron from mines which the player will have to construct at designated areas. Generally, wood and stone are used to construct buildings whereas the others are primarily used for creating and maintaining the army. Food may be harvested from either a mill or by hunting wild animals with specialized units like the trapper or the buccaneer unit. Wood is gathered by conventional means. Further, the cost of buildings, soldiers and cannons would inflate with each successive one built. Peasants are also now trained from dwellings and not from the town center, the latter now having the role as a scientific upgrade building.

American Conquest differs from Cossacks in that peasants are needed in the direct creation of military units. If no peasants are sent into forts, stables or fortresses, no units may be trained. Upgrades which would boost the fighting capability as well as the training time of the army are also conducted at those buildings. Forts and fortresses are central to the defense of any base and garrisoned troops will open fire on encroaching enemy units or wild animals.

The common economic and scientific buildings in American Conquest may also be garrisoned by either peasants or by regulars of the army. Similarly, an attacking army may also capture these garrisoned buildings by sending units into them and defeat its defenders in unseen hand-to-hand combat. Players may also construct log cabins if playing for a European power where garrisoned units receive a bonus in its defense.

Another feature of American Conquest is the morale factor. Military units would suffer from low morale if the unit is in the vicinity of a mass slaughter of his side and may flee the battlefield. Officers, standard bearers and military drummers are used to create military formations and to increase morale of the troops.

The campaign mode covers most of the major European powers' conquest in North America which includes the Spanish, the British and the French as well as the counter-campaigns narrated from the viewpoint of the Native Americans who fought against them.

== Development ==
GSC Game World designed American Conquest to attract the United States computer game market, which had been unreceptive to its earlier game Cossacks: European Wars, a hit in Europe and Russia.

== Reception ==
Reception

Aggregate scores
Aggregator	Score
GameRankings	76.22%
Metacritic	76/100

Review scores
Publication	Score
Eurogamer	9/10
GameSpot	8.4/10
IGN	8.2/10

In the United Kingdom, American Conquest sold roughly 20,000 units during the first half of 2003. Kristan Reed of GamesIndustry.biz wrote that these were "not figures that spell H.I.T."

== Expansions ==
=== American Conquest: Fight Back ===
American Conquest: Fight Back is a stand-alone expansion pack for American Conquest. It features five new nations: Germany, Russia, Haida, Portugal and the Netherlands, and 50 new units. In addition to new campaigns featuring the Mayas, the Germans, the Haida and the Russians, a new 'battlefield' game mode is available. The German campaign briefly chronicles the expedition of Ambrosius Ehinger and Georg Hohermuth whereas the Russian campaign concerns the Alaskan campaign under Alexander Baranov. The new Haida campaign is from the Haida point of view of the Russian expedition. The Mayas campaign covers details from the Spanish conquest of Yucatán.

A total conversion mod for the game was released in 2006, with patches and different versions released up until 2009, called European Warfare: Napoleonica that transferred the player back to 19th Century war-torn Europe during the Napoleonic Wars. The project was undertaken by Gexozoid (helped by several associates) from 2004 and since then had a fairly active community on GameRanger and forums up until 2015 with a recent resurgence in 2024 with the re-release of the mod. The Hawks Group recreated a vast database of historical battles that can be played in multiplayer by up to 7 players at the same time, sharing armies or fighting in co-op. It can still be downloaded on ModDB. The Mod features over 250 new units and over 60 new buildings that range from a faction's Barracks to fortifications in the form of manned cannon towers and breastworks much like in Cossacks. The re-release in 2024 had the mod made compatible with newer systems, with addition of new units, new artillery types and redone graphics, whole new set of naval units and a functional AI with tutorial campaign and single missions. 14 fully playable nations include: France, England, Poland, Austria, Prussia, Russia, Spain, Italy, Egypt, Confederacy of Rhine, Sweden, Holland, Haiti and the USA. Since update ver. 1.16 support for Russian version of American Conquest: Fight has been added and language files for Russian, Chinese and Turkish. With the release of version 1.20 a new nation was added, a plethora of buildings added and redone, and a first ever full single player campaign added. The game now contains language files for: French, German and Spanish.

=== American Conquest: Divided Nation ===
American Conquest: Divided Nation is the second stand-alone expansion to American Conquest. It was released in France in January 2006 and the rest of the world in February. It was developed by Revolution Strategy and features four new nations in three new War periods: The Union, The Confederacy, The Republic of Texas and Mexico, in the American Civil War, Texas Revolution and a single battle in the War of 1812 and more than 120 new units. Old factions are not present in the game but the United States of America can be played against the British Empire in the Battle of New Orleans in the War of 1812. However, due to the lack of buildings and workers, neither can be played in skirmish or multiplayer. The units from the battle can be accessed in a non-multiplayer by writing "qwe" in the chat and pressing P on the keyboard, an editor window will pop up on the right from which the players can choose own player colors and can spawn any unit in the game. The game also brings a host of new features to the game, such as horse artillery, field fortifications, tents, and generals. Players can experience battles entirely new to the RTS Genre, from the Battle of the Alamo to Battle of Gettysburg.

Hawks' Divided Nation, another mod project by the Hawks Group emerged which aimed at making the game more realistic by removing building, workers and the other two nations and replacing sounds as well as adding maps based on real battles in the American Civil War in which each side is player controlled.
