= Heroes of Annihilated Empires =

2006 video game

- Developer: GSC Game World
- Publisher: GSC World Publishing
- Platform: Windows
- Release: EU: October 5, 2006; UK: October 6, 2006; NA: December 1, 2006
- Genres: Real-time strategy, action role-playing
- Modes: Single-player, multiplayer

Heroes of Annihilated Empires (Ukrainian: Герої знищених імперій) is a real-time strategy role-playing video game developed by GSC Game World and released in October 2006.

== Overview ==
Heroes of Annihilated Empires is the first installment of a planned trilogy. The developers cite the Heroes of Might and Magic series and their own Cossacks series as inspirations.

The developers describe the game's genre as "RTS vs. RPG" – the game can be played as an action role-playing game with a solo hero unit or as a traditional base-building real-time strategy game. The game engine uses a 3-D world map with 2-D unit sprites, although larger units and the heroes are fully 3-D models. The small units are sprites to save processing power as there can be upwards of several hundred present in large battles. Heroes of Annihilated Empires features four playable races and twelve neutral races. The game supports up to 7 players via LAN or Internet.

== Setting ==
The game's setting and storyline were created by Ukrainian novelist Ilya Novak, who received an Encouragement Award at Eurocon 2005. Novak describes the game's genre as "epic dark fantasy". A series of five novels were planned to support the game; as of November 2006, three have been published in Russia.

== Gameplay ==
Heroes of Annihilated Empires has four playable races: the Elves (Sylvan Folk), the Undead (Legions of Ashes), the Mechanicians (Dwarves who use machines), and the Cryo Race (barbarians with a specialty in cold magic). Also a fifth race is available through a mod from the GSC forum called Sols (Egyptian Fire Magicians). The player can select one of three hero types: Warrior, Ranger, and Mage. When a game begins, the player can cast a spell called "Rally Troops" to turn the hero into a statue for 30 minutes, and in return gain a few builder units, or sell the spell for 2100 gold coins. If the player sells the spell, the game plays as a role-playing game; otherwise the game plays as a real-time strategy game.

On the real-time strategy mode the main focus of involves around base building, resource collection and defeating the opponent. There are also scored games where both players focus on increasing the overall score to achieve victory. The real-time strategy mode allows for battles in ground, water and air levels though naval warfare remains effective only in multiplayer as the AI is unable to build ports and ships.

The real-time strategy battles are huge with thousands of units. Many units like Were-wolves, Vampires etc. are capable of transforming into entirely different units. Were-wolves, for instance, can transform into Archers and Vampires can change themselves into Bats.
