= GSC Game World =

Ukrainian video game developer

- Type: Private
- Industry: Video games
- Founded: 1995; 31 years ago in Kyiv, Ukraine
- Founder: Sergiy Grygorovych
- Headquarters: Kyiv, Ukraine (primary); Prague, Czech Republic (secondary) (Note: As a result of the 2022 Russian invasion of Ukraine, GSC Game World relocated some of their staff to Prague and opened a second office.)
- Key people: Ievgen Grygorovych (CEO); Mariia Grygorovych (COO)
- Products: Cossacks series; S.T.A.L.K.E.R. series
- Owner: Maksym Krippa
- Number of employees: 500+ (2026)
- Website: gsc-game.com

GSC Game World is a Ukrainian video game developer based in Kyiv with a second office in Prague. Founded in Kyiv in 1995 by Sergiy Grygorovych, it is best known for the Cossacks and S.T.A.L.K.E.R. series of games. GSC Game World was the first company in Ukraine to localize PC games. In 2002, it became a publishing house, GSC World Publishing.

== History ==
=== Founding and early activity ===
The company was founded in 1995 by Sergiy Grygorovych (Ukrainian: Сергій Костянтинович Григорович, romanized: Serhiy Kostyantynovych Hryhorovych), who became chief executive officer (CEO). He came up with the company name and emblem in 1993, aged 15. "GSC" are the initials of his name in the transliteration "Grygorovych Sergiy Constantinovich". Later Grygorovych explained this decision:

My father used to say that you have to devote your life to making a name for yourself so that later there would be something to be proud of. And so I used my initials to name the company.

— Sergiy Grygorovych

By 1996, the company employed fifteen people in a two-room apartment. Early employees included Grygorovych's younger brother, Ievgen, and Andrew Prokhorov. The company was the first in Ukraine to translate video games into Russian, additionally creating multimedia CD-ROM encyclopedias.

=== Game development ===
In 1997 the company started developing its first video game, but difficulties in development led to its quick abandonment.

I remembered the principle: if you want to do something but don't know what exactly, look at the others and don't do the same. Our market didn't demand intellect in those times, so we decided to target the western audience. Moreover, the CIS market was unstable after the 1998 crisis.

— Sergiy Grygorovych

In 1998 GSC reoriented to the Western market, developing real-time strategy games. GSC unsuccessfully tried to get a contract for the development of Warcraft 3 from Blizzard Entertainment. According to the CEO, they were rejected due to Blizzard's distrust of Grygorovych's youth. By the end of 1998, the company finished its debut commercial game, WarCraft 2000: Nuclear Epidemic. It was powered by its own engine, which was subsequently reused by Cossacks: European Wars. Nuclear Epidemic distinguished itself from other strategy games of the time with its increased unit size limits. At the beginning of 1999, it was released for free online. They began development on another project titled DoomCraft, which was shuttered six months later in favor of the development of Cossacks.

=== Company debut ===
In 2001, GSC Game World released the real-time strategy game for Windows, Cossacks: European Wars. It was the first game that brought the company financial success and global recognition. Later that year, GSC Game World released the tactical first-person shooter Codename: Outbreak and an expansion for Cossacks named Cossacks: The Art of War. In the same year, GSC began developing a story-driven shooter based on the Stargate series concept and Aztec architecture. It was powered by a custom X-Ray Engine, which rendered high-quality images and supported many modern technologies. The project was titled Oblivion Lost.

At the beginning, we developed a game with a plot about the war of robots and aliens in the entourage of nature and the Aztec pyramids.
But at every meeting, we said to ourselves: "We are doing complete nonsense."

— Sergiy Grygorovych, about the canceled game Oblivion Lost

In 2002, the company released the combat hovercraft arcade racing game Hover Ace: Combat Racing Zone and another expansion to Cossacks called Cossacks: Back to War. At the end of that year, a new real-time strategy game named American Conquest was released. Also, in March 2002, after the GSC Game World company trip to the Chornobyl Exclusion Zone, the Oblivion Lost concept was wholly revised and used the Chornobyl disaster as a foundation. The game was called Stalker: Oblivion Lost, but soon the name changed to S.T.A.L.K.E.R.: Oblivion Lost, due to copyright complications with the word "Stalker". The rendering system was reworked. The game was scheduled to be released at the end of 2003.

In 2003, the company released the addition American Conquest: Fight Back and the first-person shooter FireStarter. Also, the development of the first-person shooter S.T.A.L.K.E.R.: Oblivion Lost continued, and THQ became its publisher. By their recommendation, S.T.A.L.K.E.R.: Shadow of Chernobyl became the official name that got the first accurate release date – the middle of 2004.

Logo of GSC World Publishing

In 2004, GSC opened GSC World Publishing, a division that would publish GSC's games in countries of the Commonwealth of Independent States and in Europe. Together with Ubisoft on 20 November 2004, it published its own developed RTS game Alexander, the official game based on Oliver Stone's movie Alexander. The release of S.T.A.L.K.E.R.: Shadow of Chernobyl was postponed by THQ to 2005 due a transition to a new rendering process. In 2005, a sequel of the Cossacks strategy, Cossacks II: Napoleonic Wars, was released. In February 2005, the release of Shadow of Chernobyl was postponed indefinitely. In 2006, the company released an expansion for the Cossacks series titled Cossacks II: Battle for Europe, and a new real-time strategy role-playing game, Heroes of Annihilated Empires. The company released a statement that Shadow of Chernobyl should be released in the first quarter of 2007. At the beginning of the year, some GSC employees left the company to found 4A Games studio.

On 20 March 2007, S.T.A.L.K.E.R.: Shadow of Chernobyl was officially released. On 24 March 2007, S.T.A.L.K.E.R. held the eighth position in the sales charts for various platforms, and the first position among PC games according to the rating of British organization ELSPA. On 12 February 2008, 950 thousand copies in the CIS and 700 thousand copies elsewhere in the world were sold, which made S.T.A.L.K.E.R.: Shadow of Chernobyl the most successful project of GSC Game World to date.

The worldwide success of Shadow of Chernobyl pushed the company to develop its next project. On 5 December 2007, a mobile game, S.T.A.L.K.E.R. Mobile, was created by Qplaze in conjunction with GSC. On 22 August 2008, the stand-alone expansion S.T.A.L.K.E.R.: Clear Sky was released, a prequel for Shadow of Chernobyl. A sequel for Shadow of Chernobyl, S.T.A.L.K.E.R.: Call of Pripyat, was released on 2 October 2009, the third game in the series.

In 2009, GSC began work on S.T.A.L.K.E.R. 2. The company officially announced the game on 13 August 2010. During development, the company shrank from 200 employees to 50. It had previously been the largest video game developer in Eastern Europe. Financial services company Ernst & Young named Grygorovych Ukraine's "entrepreneur of the year" in February 2011. On 9 December 2011, the Ukrainian News Agency, published a message with a statement from GSC Game World CEO Sergiy Grygorovych that the company had dissolved. Development of the S.T.A.L.K.E.R. 2 game was discontinued. Grygorovych stated that he did so for personal reasons. Studio spokesperson Valentine Yeltyshev said that the studio's financial situation played a minor role in the dissolution.

=== Revival ===
At the end of 2014, GSC Game World re-opened and announced that it was working on a new game. The company founder's brother Ievgen Grygorovych (Ukrainian: Євген Григорович, romanized: Yevhen Hryhorovych) became its new CEO. In May 2015, the company announced Cossacks 3, a remake of the first Cossacks game, including "all its original gameplay". The game was released on 20 September 2016 on Steam, after which, the game was finalized and updated.

On 15 May 2018, GSC re-announced S.T.A.L.K.E.R. 2: Heart of Chornobyl. The game was released on 20 November 2024, for Windows and the Xbox Series X/S.

In 2020, Ukrainian businessman Maksym Krippa acquired a 40% stake in the company, and in September 2023, he became the beneficial owner of the company.

On March 6, 2024 S.T.A.L.K.E.R.: Legends of the Zone Trilogy - an anothology including enhanced editions of S.T.A.L.K.E.R.: Shadow of Chornobyl, S.T.A.L.K.E.R.: Clear Sky and S.T.A.L.K.E.R.: Call of Prypiat was released for PlayStation 4 and Xbox One, with a Nintendo Switch version to follow on October 31, 2024. On May 20, 2025 S.T.A.L.K.E.R.: Legends of the Zone Trilogy - Enhanced Edition - was released on PlayStation 5, Xbox Series X/S and PC.

On November 20, 2025 S.T.A.L.K.E.R. 2: Heart of Chornobyl released on PlayStation 5 and PlayStation 5 Pro. On August 20, 2026 S.T.A.L.K.E.R. 2: Cost of Hope - the first major expansion for S.T.A.L.K.E.R. 2: Heart of Chornobyl - released on PC, PlayStation 5/Pro and Xbox Series X/S simultaneously.

=== Russian invasion of Ukraine ===
When the 2022 Russian invasion of Ukraine began, GSC paused development on S.T.A.L.K.E.R. 2. The company used social media to urge fans and game journalists to donate to the Ukrainian Armed Forces and provided special accounts for donations. GSC Game World removed Russian voiceovers from S.T.A.L.K.E.R. 2 — the official full localization is available only in Ukrainian and English. The company has also suspended sales of its games in Russia and Belarus. Part of the team had been relocated to Prague, with the majority of them staying in Ukraine. By May 2022, the work on S.T.A.L.K.E.R. 2's resumed. One former GSC Game World developer, Volodymyr Yezhov, was killed in action near Bakhmut in December 2022. On 27 December 2022, a farewell ceremony for Yezhov was held in the Volodymyr Cathedral with the participation of a military guard, which was attended by many people.

In April 2022, GSC Game World has raised $800,000 in support of Ukraine during the charity sale.

In October 2024, GSC Game World partnered up with Xbox to launch a documentary War Game: The Making of S.T.A.L.K.E.R. 2 about creating STALKER 2 in an active war zone in Ukraine.

In 2025 SC Game World and United24 launched a raffle to support the Bring Light Back fundraiser. Over $120,000 was raised, with these funds, generators were purchased that are now operating in educational institutions in different regions of Ukraine.

In September 2025, the State Emergency Service of Ukraine, in collaboration with GSC Game World, launched a project based on S.T.A.L.K.E.R. 2, in which the game’s protagonist, Skif, explained the basic rules of mine safety to teenagers in simple terms: don’t approach, don’t touch, retrace your steps, and call 101. The goal of the project was to change young people’s behaviour in dangerous situations. This social project won 28 awards and the Grand Prix at the Kyiv International Advertising Festival (KIAF) as part of Ukrainian Creative Stories 2026.

In September 2026, GSC Game World and United24 teamed up once again, featuring S.T.A.L.K.E.R. 2: Cost of Hope, to raise $100,000 to help clear deadly landmines from the Chornobyl exclusion zone.

On 18 November 2025 the company was declared an "undesirable organization" in Russia.

== Games ==
Title	Initial Release date	Platform(s)	Publisher(s)	Ref(s).
WarCraft 2000: Nuclear Epidemic	25 November 1998	Microsoft Windows	–	
Cossacks: European Wars	28 November 2000	Microsoft Windows	CDV Software, Russobit-M	
Codename: Outbreak	8 October 2001	Microsoft Windows	Virgin Interactive, Russobit-M	
Cossacks: The Art of War	20 November 2001	Microsoft Windows	CDV Software, Russobit-M	
Hover Ace: Combat Racing Zone	2 September 2002	Microsoft Windows	Strategy First, Russobit-M	
Cossacks: Back to War	1 November 2002	Microsoft Windows	CDV Software, Russobit-M	
American Conquest	18 December 2002	Microsoft Windows	CDV Software, Russobit-M	
American Conquest: Fight Back	25 June 2003	Microsoft Windows	CDV Software, Russobit-M	
FireStarter	28 November 2003	Microsoft Windows	Hip Interactive, Russobit-M	
Alexander	20 November 2004	Microsoft Windows	Ubisoft, GSC World Publishing	
Cossacks II: Napoleonic Wars	4 April 2005	Microsoft Windows	CDV Software, GSC World Publishing	
Cossacks II: Battle for Europe	19 June 2006	Microsoft Windows	CDV Software, GSC World Publishing	
Heroes of Annihilated Empires	6 October 2006	Microsoft Windows	CDV Software, GSC World Publishing	
S.T.A.L.K.E.R.: Shadow of Chernobyl	20 March 2007	Microsoft Windows	THQ, GSC World Publishing	
S.T.A.L.K.E.R. Mobile (Note: Co-developed with Qplaze)	5 December 2007	Java ME	NOMOC World Publishing	
S.T.A.L.K.E.R.: Clear Sky	22 August 2008	Microsoft Windows	Deep Silver, GSC World Publishing	
S.T.A.L.K.E.R.: Call of Pripyat	2 October 2009	Microsoft Windows	bitComposer Games, GSC World Publishing	
Cossacks 3	20 September 2016	Microsoft Windows, Linux	GSC Game World	
S.T.A.L.K.E.R.: Legends of the Zone Trilogy	6 March 2024	PlayStation 4, Xbox One, Nintendo Switch, PlayStation 5, Xbox Series X/S	GSC Game World	
S.T.A.L.K.E.R. 2: Heart of Chornobyl	20 November 2024	Microsoft Windows, Xbox Series X/S, PlayStation 5	GSC Game World	

=== Cancelled games ===
Title	Cancellation date	Platform(s)	Ref(s).
Unnamed quest game	1997	Microsoft Windows	
DoomCraft	January 1999	Microsoft Windows	
Oblivion Lost	February 2002	Microsoft Windows, Xbox	
Warlocks	2002	Microsoft Windows	
Robbery (working title)	2006	Microsoft Windows	
Unnamed S.T.A.L.K.E.R. game for PSP	Spring 2007	PlayStation Portable	
S.T.A.L.K.E.R. Online	October 2011	Browser game	

== Game engines ==
Vital Engine is a game engine created for Codename: Outbreak, and later used for the Xenus games series (Boiling Point: Road to Hell and White Gold: War in Paradise) and The Precursors by Ukrainian developer Deep Shadows.

X-Ray Engine is a game engine created for the S.T.A.L.K.E.R. games series. X-Ray uses the free physics engine Open Dynamics Engine elements.

== Legacy ==
Studios formed by teams and members from the GSC studio:

- Deep Shadows was founded 30 August 2001 in Kyiv by Sergiy Zabaryansky and Roman Lut. Deep Shadows games use the Vital Engine, developed by the company's founders while at GSC.
- 4A Games was founded 2 March 2006 by a S.T.A.L.K.E.R. concept art team member. The company's employees immediately started creating their debut project, Metro 2033: The Last Refuge. 4A Games later developed the Metro game series.
- Vostok Games was founded in 2012, after the temporary dissolution of GSC. The organization is developing and supporting the original post-apocalyptic online game Survarium. It also developed Fear the Wolves, a battle royale game released in 2019.
- West-Games was founded in 2012, originally under the name Union Studio, by chief executive officer Eugene Kim, who had formerly been GSC's team lead and software developer. Kim had worked on GSC's canceled browser-based S.T.A.L.K.E.R. Online massively multiplayer online game, while five other employees had worked on prior S.T.A.L.K.E.R. games. In 2013, Union Studio reorganized as West-Games, and in June 2014, the studio launched a crowdfunding campaign on Kickstarter for a supposed spiritual successor to S.T.A.L.K.E.R. called Areal. The campaign was highly criticized because of the game's trailer, which almost exclusively used footage from previous S.T.A.L.K.E.R. games. When asked to provide images from the game, representatives of West-Games presented screenshots of a landscape that was a slightly modified version of a pre-designed asset available for purchase on the "Asset Store" for the Unity game engine. Several parties, including the "MISERY" mod developer, stated that the project was a scam. Of the initially sought US $50,000, Areal raised almost $65,000, however, in July 2014, two days before its campaign closed, the project was suspended from Kickstarter, with Kickstarter citing guideline violations. West-Games initially claimed to have switched to private funding, though announced another crowdfunding campaign, this time on Wefunder, in December 2014, seeking $600,000 to produce a game called S.T.A.L.K.E.R.: Apocalypse. When GSC reformed, the studio stated that West-Games was legally not allowed to develop a S.T.A.L.K.E.R. game, as GSC held all rights to the franchise.
- Flying Cafe for Semianimals was founded in 2015 by the creative director Ilya Tolmachev, who was previously engaged in S.T.A.L.K.E.R.: Call of Pripyat. The company's debut game was Cradle.
