= Alexander (video game) =

2004 video game

- Developer: GSC Game World
- Publisher: Ubisoft
- Platform: Windows
- Release: NA: November 23, 2004; EU: November 26, 2004
- Genre: Real-time strategy
- Modes: Single-player, multiplayer

Alexander (Ukrainian: Олександр) is a real-time strategy game created by GSC Game World (creators of Cossacks: European Wars and Cossacks II: Napoleonic Wars) and published by Ubisoft, based on the 2004 film of the same name.

== Gameplay ==
Alexander's gameplay shares several similarities to that of the Cossacks series, with elements of the Age of Empires series and Age of Mythology. The game's map covers the area from Macedonia to India. In a player's first playthrough, they can only play as Alexander, but after beating the game players can play campaigns as Egypt, Persia and India. Alexander also featured a "skirmish" mode, and online multiplayer.

== Reception ==
Reception

Aggregate score
Aggregator	Score
Metacritic	56/100

Review scores
Publication	Score
Eurogamer	4/10
GameSpot	5.2/10
GameSpy	1.5/5
IGN	7/10
PC Format	70%
PC Gamer (UK)	61%
PC Gamer (US)	77%
PC Zone	41%
X-Play	2/5

Alexander received mixed reviews, earning a 56 out of 100 from Metacritic. Steve Butts of IGN gave a mixed review, describing the game as "traditional and predictable", praising its graphics but criticising the game for battles that he perceived to be largely absent of tactics. Craig Beers of GameSpot gave the game 5.2 out of 10, declaring that it had poor controls, and suffered from numerous glitches and factual inaccuracies, though he praised its visuals. Jim Rossignol, writing in PC Format, gave the game a score of 70%, declaring that combat within it "depends more on rushed clicking and sheer numbers than it does on clever use of tactical abilities", and stated that it was inferior to contemporary games in the Total War series.

Kieron Gillen of Eurogamer gave a negative review of the game, declaring of it "This is rubbish", and stating that it did nothing better than its contemporaries of the same genre. GameSpy gave the game a rating of "Poor", describing it as "a pretty history hack with crummy controls", and finding that its "Skirmish" mode was nearly unplayable due to lag.
