= FireStarter (video game) =

2003 video game

- Developer: GSC Game World
- Publisher: Hip Games
- Producers: Sergey Grygorovych; Anton Bolshakov
- Designer: Slava Klimov
- Programmer: Sergey Zabaryansky
- Artist: Andrew Prokhorov
- Engine: FireStarter Engine
- Platform: Microsoft Windows
- Release: 28 November 2003
- Genre: First-person shooter
- Modes: Single-player, multiplayer

FireStarter is a 2003 first-person shooter video game developed by Ukrainian GSC Game World and published by Hip Games for Microsoft Windows. Set in the year 2010, the player character's consciousness has been trapped inside of a virtual reality game with a deadly computer virus intending on making sure they will never be able to leave the game.

== Gameplay ==
The player can choose from six different types of characters to play as. A few examples of which include the Agent (a women with excellent acrobatic skills), the Cyborg (a heavily armored man with cybernetic implants who can regenerate armor), and the Mutant (a four-armed mutant creature who has the ability to fire with all his four arms). The game has many role-playing elements and the player can unlock different skills for their various characters as they level up throughout the game.

== Plot ==
By the year 2010, video games have gotten so advanced that people are able to upload their consciousnesses into virtual reality machines to experience more realistic and lifelike simulations than ever before. The player character is the owner of one such gaming machine: called the FireStarter. However a malicious computer virus has infected the machine and it has trapped the player's consciousness inside with it. The game has been altered in a deadly manner and there's only one possible way for the player to escape the game with their life intact; they must complete the game within 48 hours or face certain death.

== Reception ==
FireStarter received mixed to positive reviews upon release. It received a score of 6.2 from GameSpot, 7.5 from IGN, and 8.0 from Russian gaming magazine Igromania.
