= Codename: Outbreak =

2001 video game

- Developer: GSC Game World
- Publisher: Virgin Interactive
- Producer: Sergey Zabaryansky
- Designer: Roman Lut
- Programmer: Sergey Zabaryansky
- Artist: Andrew Prokhorov
- Writer: Alex Dragon
- Platform: Microsoft Windows
- Release: EU: 12 October 2001; NA: 25 November 2001
- Genre: First-person shooter
- Modes: Single-player, multiplayer

Codename: Outbreak (known as Venom. Codename: Outbreak in Ukraine and Russia) is a 2001 first-person shooter video game developed by Ukrainian GSC Game World and published by Virgin Interactive. It is set during the early 21st century. Prior to the start of the game, a meteor shower arrives containing a parasitic alien life form that takes control of their hosts. The invasion is fast spreading. The game involves fighting off this alien invasion over 14 different levels.

In North America, the game was part of a $20 budget range from Titus Interactive which was branded using the Virgin Interactive name alongside Original War, Screamer 4x4, and Nightstone.

== Gameplay ==
Instead of carrying several weapons as in traditional first-person shooter, the player carries one with several modes, (e.g. machine gun, laser, flare, sniper, rocket launcher, etc.). The universal weapon has a barrel, each slot of which fires a different type of ammo. The only weapon that has infinite ammo is the laser, which is also completely silent (to the enemy AI) and is, therefore, invaluable to stealth operations. Different missions call for different tools so what to take is crucial. The actual weapon has an advanced range. The models determine which attachments are on, the deadliness of the rifle, the fire rate, and the accuracy. As such, they are also heavy.

Armor is a crucial choice as well, as players get to pick different armor suits, which are built for different situations. There is one for Urban, one for Desert and one for Forest. There are also advanced versions called "Seraphim" which boosts a lot more protection.

The players carry an inventory which carries everything. Even the armor suit and gun the player uses is there. Each character can only hold up to a certain limit of items. How much the player carries in Outbreak does not slow the character down. Apart from ammo and equipment, players may find other items that are needed, such as medical equipment, PDAs and other miscellaneous items.

The single-player campaign is played with a two-person squad, with the player able to switch between the two and give the other orders. This campaign can also be played as 2 player coop. If playing singly the player can choose who is on the squad, as there is a number of recruits. Each is better in some stat or another so careful choices must be made. If a squad member dies during the campaign, they cannot get them back. They will be marked as KIA for the remainder of the campaign.

== Plot ==
During the early 21st century, a meteor storm strikes an open valley in the United States. Police, science teams and Marine units are dispatched to investigate. They disappear shortly after. In the opening cut-scene, an advance team is operating when it is reported some of the men have stopped broadcasting on the radios. Captain Wilson, leader of the team, and his friend Steve suddenly come under fire from their comrades. As they retreat for aerial pickup, Steve is wounded. As Wilson desperately waits for the transport to arrive, an unknown beast suddenly leaps at Wilson and the screen blacks out.

Shortly after this, an advanced organization is starting to learn about what is happening in the zone in order to understand the nature of the situation and initiate a counter-attack against the aliens. To achieve this, an advanced strike force (players and AI-controlled soldiers) investigate to find the Marines and police that have been infected by parasites.

Shortly after, an advanced research facility is established to fulfill the needs of studying the invaders. Shortly after completion and commencing of operations, the facility itself is plagued by the aliens and it is not long before everyone is infected. Once again, the strike force must enter the fray. They first break inside the facility from the outside perimeter, encountering new foes such as mutated beasts, like the one who attacked Captain Wilson, and tanks. Once inside, they must gather intelligence and clear out the threat. Inside, they discover yet another surviving scientist. The team escort the scientist by re-emerging outside to ambushes from more infected forces. After clearing the enemy out, the team reaches an extraction point close to where they breached the facility earlier.

The team is pushed into a lot of missions. Part of them revolve around the protection and launch of the Icarus-1 Satellite, which can track and determine the large-scale spread of the alien infection. Others are clearing out targets of great importance, such as one mission where players are required to break into an airfield and reprogram the air defenses in order to deny the enemy their immense aerial support. Some are even around preventing catastrophe, such as three attempts to launch missiles for destructive use, one of these being, when secured, the launch device for Icarus-1, and the rest being fixed and mobile nuclear tipped ballistic missiles. It is quite clear throughout this how severe the invasion is. Many numbers of enemies are encountered, ranging from defense turrets to heavy vehicles like APC's. The team has to adapt quickly to each mission or they will suffer greatly on the road ahead.

In the final mission, Icarus-1 is launched and orbits Earth. It detects a massive heat source on a small island, surrounded by other sources. It is determined that the aliens operate as a collective and the massive signature is the central mind. Without this entity, the aliens would probably go into disarray with lack of leadership and be unable to invade any further. The team is ordered to penetrate the area and rig the area at the controlling entity with a nuclear bomb. Once the bomb is set, the team must evacuate quickly if they do not wish to perish as well.

Upon successful completion, the bomb detonates, destroying the central mind and everything around it. As predicted, the alien forces breakdown from having no one to lead them and are therefore now easy to get rid of.

== Reception ==
Reception

Review scores
Publication	Score
PC Gamer US	50%
GameSpy	75%

Codename: Outbreak received a score of 50% from PC Gamer US.
