= Original War =

2001 video game

- Developer: Altar Interactive
- Publisher: Virgin Interactive
- Designer: Vladimír Chvátil
- Composer: Michal Pavlíček
- Platform: Microsoft Windows
- Release: UK: June 15, 2001
- Genre: Real-time strategy
- Modes: Single-player, multiplayer

Original War is a real-time strategy video game developed by Czech company Altar Interactive and released by Virgin Interactive on June 15, 2001. It was re-released in the United Kingdom under the budget Sold Out label in 2004, and was later re-released again by Good Old Games in 2008.

In North America, the game was part of a $20 budget range from Titus Interactive which was branded using the Virgin Interactive name alongside Screamer 4x4, Codename: Outbreak and Nightstone.

The game received a PEGI 18 rating, citing discrimination.

== Plot ==
An American expedition to Russia during World War I discovers an extraterrestrial mineral, Siberite, that can catalyze cold fusion and fuel an alien artifact they name EON. EON is revealed to be a time machine capable of sending objects into the past, but by this time Siberite stocks are exhausted and research stops. Then in the new millennium vast deposits of the mineral are found in Siberia, and Americans are able to extract enough of it for small-scale time-travel.

The U.S. plans to send a small force two million years back in time. There it will mine the Siberite and transport it over the Bering Land Bridge to Alaska, into what will one day be in American hands. Elite troops are selected, briefed, and told that it is a one-way trip back through time.

This results in a present day dominated by America. A communist Russia fumes, turning to outrage when their scientists find traces of American settlement and Alaskite, the source of U.S. power, in remote Siberia. An expedition is sent through the alien artifact, which the Russians name TAWAR, to repel the American thieves and preserve what is rightfully theirs.

The game's story is loosely based on the sci-fi novel The Last Day of Creation (1981) by Wolfgang Jeschke.

== Gameplay ==
A screenshot from American campaign.

Original War is an RTS: the player constructs a base, finds resources, builds vehicles, and destroys the enemy. Its distinguishing feature is the way the game mechanics reflect the backstory's scarcity of resources and isolation.

It is not possible to train new men. Moreover, the same units who fight are needed for resource gathering and the bases' functions. Production facilities, research labs, vehicles and base defenses are all useless when unmanned. The local apemen can be trained to do simple tasks, and with the right research it is possible to use remote control and AIs, but all are generally worse in combat than humans. Losses in personnel are otherwise irreplaceable.

Units do not fight to the end. Critical damage causes humans and apemen to collapse, and vehicles and buildings to eject their occupants and catch fire. They can be saved if they are healed or repaired before they bleed out or explode, respectively. After a battle the winner generally finishes off downed survivors and seeks to capture enemy vehicles by repairing them until they're out of critical state and entering them with a human.

Original War is "almost as much an RPG as a RTS". Each human or apeman unit has its own name and portrait, speed, firepower and defense scores, and experience levels in each of the game's four classes. Humans can change class (or "kit") in seconds by ducking into an appropriate building. Soldiers deal and withstand much more damage, can crawl, and receive huge bonuses while in emplacements. Mechanics can construct and repair vehicles, and receive equally huge bonuses while driving them. Engineers can haul resources, initiate the construction of new buildings, and repair and dismantle buildings. Scientists are researchers, healers, and apeman tamers. Units gain experience points (XP) and level up in a class by performing actions associated with the class, faster if they are that class at the time. Missions have limits for how much experience a unit can gain in a class.

The game has three types of resources: crates, oil and Siberite/Alaskite crystals. Supply crates sent from the future are the foundation of all construction. Small piles of crates appear on the map with a thunderclap at random intervals. The majority of maps in the game have regions where crates appear the most often. American optoelectronics enable them to pinpoint the exact locations of the crates as they arrive, while the Russians, who have focused on time-based technology, are able to predict a perimeter where the crates will arrive a few seconds before they materialise.

Oil and Siberite/Alaskite power bases and vehicles. Scientists can locate their deposits, and constructing a tower or mine on a deposit generates a steady stream of the resource. This may be the only base function that works automatically. Oil is used mostly early- and midgame as a cheap yet readily available power source. Oil-burning vehicles have fuel meters. They can be refueled at a base or by transporting oil to them, and the driver can get out and push. Siberite/Alaskite allows vehicles to run indefinitely, and opens up several advanced research topics. Solar power needs no resources, which shows in the pitiful, though regenerating, fuel supply of solar vehicles.

Original War has an American and a Russian campaign. The game recommends playing the American one first. Missions on both sides tend to contain scripted events, multiple-choice situations and sidequests. Human units persist between missions, so that each loss is a loss for the rest of the game. Mission design keeps the ranks from becoming too thin or too thick. For instance, the player might be ordered to choose eight men from veterans of previous missions and other members of the side, defend an outpost, and return after the mission. Units also gain XP for completing missions. The XP gained increases further into the game, and is affected by the player's success in completing the various demands (generally sidequests) in each mission. The player chooses one class for each unit to receive 50% of the XP, and the other three classes gain the remaining 50% between them. Unusually, the XP requirements to go up a level are fixed, so that the level after 1000 will always require 3000 and so forth, but which levels they are is not. For example, a brilliant mechanic's skill is reflected not by having them perform much better than other mechanics of the same level (a character of the same level in a class being roughly as good as another), but by reaching a much higher level than their colleagues at the same XP threshold.

== History ==
=== Community support ===
In January/February 2005, a member of the game's community, Stuart "Stucuk" Carey, asked Altar Interactive (now known as Altar Games) for permission to maintain Original War with patches. Altar Interactive agreed and gave access to the source code. Later in June, work began on the first patch v1.03, which primarily added basic Mod support to Original War.

=== Multiplayer ===
Originally the only way to play Original War over the internet was through GameSpy Arcade. In 2007, starting with version 1.09 however, the game features a working master server hosted by Original War Support, and an IRC based chat system that allows people to set up or join multiplayer matches from an ingame menu. In July 2011, the community website Original-war.net released a working version of a multiplayer ranking system that records the outcomes of matches and displays them online.

== Reception ==
The Finnish Pelit magazine gave Original War a score of 82% in a two-page review. Reviewer Aleksi Stenberg wrote that the plot and the unusual gameplay made the game more interesting than a dozen Red Alerts. He warmed up to Original War at a time when he had grown weary with the genre and also complimented the interface. He criticized overspecialized character classes, the vehicles' designs, and the voice acting.

The Finnish general computing magazine MikroBITTI awarded the game 91%. Its review praised the game's playability and mentioned voice acting as the only clearly negative feature.

The reviewer for the Polish game portal GRYOnline noted that the game sold well in Poland and Czechia, and in both countries developed a cult following.
