= Oleksiy Khilskyi =

Ukrainian actor (1987–2023)

- Born: Oleksiy Yuriyovych Khilskyi; 14 November 1987; Dniprodzerzhynsk, Dnipropetrovsk Oblast, Ukrainian SSR, USSR
- Died: 17 August 2023 (aged 35); Zaporizhzhia Oblast, Ukraine
- Military career
- Allegiance: Ukraine
- Branch: Ukrainian Ground Forces
- Rank: Staff sergeant
- Conflicts: Russo-Ukrainian War
- Awards: Order For Courage, 3rd class

Oleksiy Yuriyovych Khilskyi (Ukrainian: Олексій Юрійович Хільський; 14 November 1987, Dniprodzerzhinsk (Kamyanske), Dnipropetrovsk Oblast, Ukrainian SSR, USSR - 17 August 2023) was a Ukrainian theater and film actor, chief sergeant of the Armed Forces of Ukraine, a participant in the Russian-Ukrainian war.

== Biography ==
From 2005 to 2019, he was an actor of the Dnipro Drama Youth Theater "We Believe!". In 2014, he graduated from the Dnipropetrovsk Theater and Art College. Since 2019, he'd been living in Kyiv with his wife. He worked in the Vivat Children's Music and Drama Theater, acted in films and TV series. The couple had a daughter.

In the first days of the full-scale war of the Russian Federation against Ukraine, he came to the defense of Ukraine. He was constantly on the front line. He participated in the offensive in the Kherson Oblast, defended Bakhmut and Soledar. He died on 17 August 2023, while performing a combat mission in the Zaporizhzhia direction.

The movie War Game: The Making of S.T.A.L.K.E.R. 2 is dedicated to the designer of the original S.T.A.L.K.E.R. Volodymyr Yezhov, voice actor Oleksiy Khilsky and other fallen defenders of Ukraine.
