= Cossacks 3 =

2016 video game

- Developer: GSC Game World
- Publisher: GSC Game World
- Platforms: Microsoft Windows, Linux
- Release: 20 September 2016
- Genre: Real-time strategy
- Modes: Single-player, multiplayer

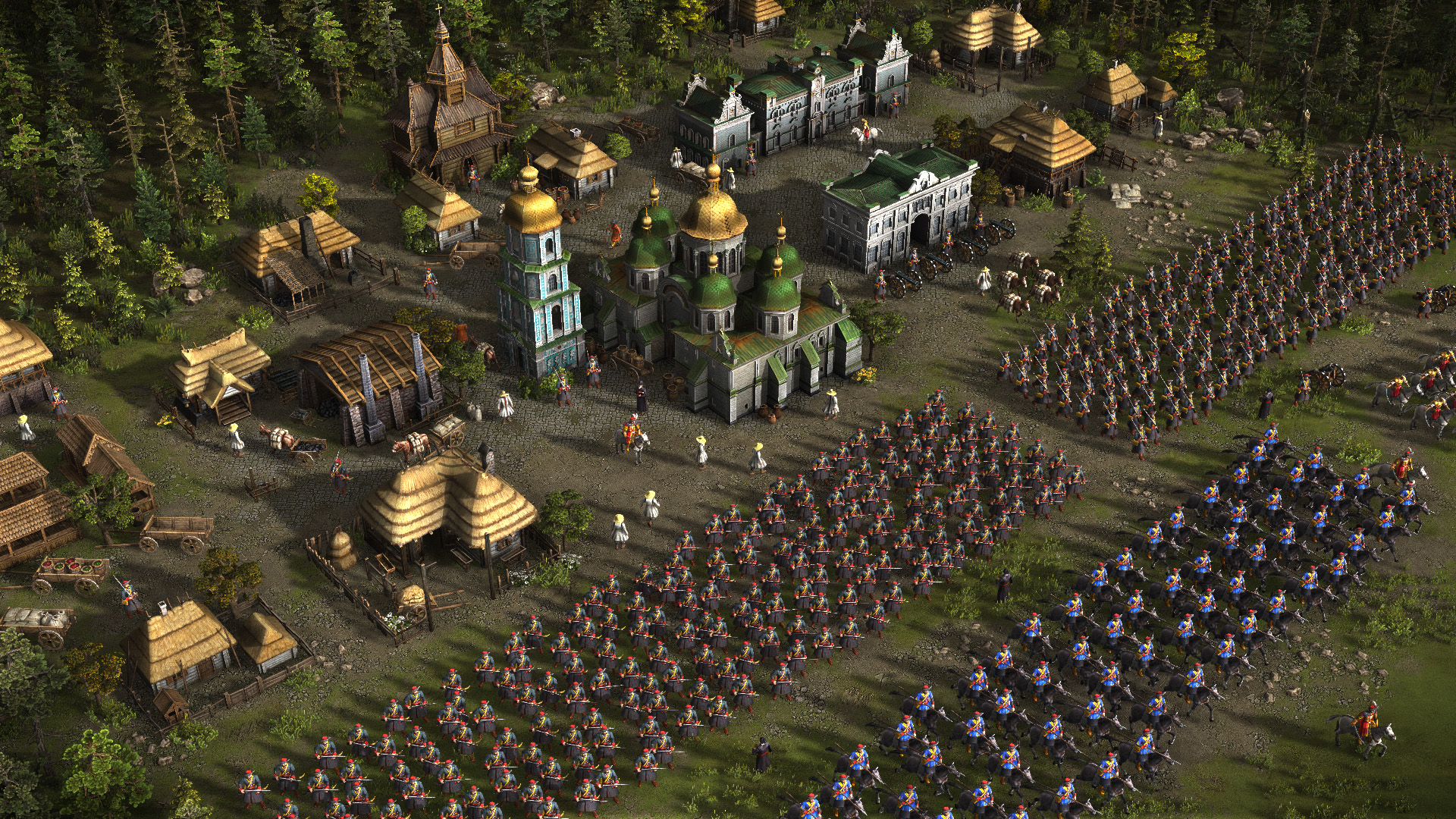
In-game screenshot

Cossacks 3 (Ukrainian: Козаки 3) is a real-time strategy video game for Microsoft Windows by the Ukrainian developer GSC Game World. It is a remake of the 2000 game Cossacks: European Wars and is once again set in 17th and 18th century Europe.

The main differences from the old game are the modern 3D graphics capabilities, updated models and textures, dynamic lighting and full support for mods.

== Gameplay ==
The original 12 nations make a return, as well as 70 types of unit, 100 technologies, and over 140 historical buildings. The game features support for up to 8 players (1 more than the original) with armies numbering in the thousands. Revamped game mechanics, a vast selection of unit types, ranged and close quarters combat, terrain bonuses, and a realistic ballistics engine provide the player with an unlimited number of tactical opportunities against both human and AI opponents. The game also reintroduces the flexible customization of random maps.

== Development and release ==
Beta testing began in April 2016, and the game was available worldwide on Microsoft Windows on 20 September the same year. A Linux version was released on 20 June 2017.

The developers have mentioned official modding support and their intention to release the tools used to make the game. They have also stated that they will be working closely with the modding community and aim to add more content to the game after release.

=== Downloadable content ===
- Days of Brilliance – released on 13 December 2016, it provides a new Polish campaign, new mission, 5 additional historical scenarios, new units for the old nations and two new nations: Denmark and the Netherlands.
- Rise to Glory – released on 16 February 2017, it provides second Prussian and Swedish campaigns, new units, snow-covered landscapes, new scenarios, and nations: Bavaria and Saxony.
- Guardians of the Highlands – released on 12 April 2017, it provides the third Scottish campaign, new units, "Personal Assistant", Scotland for multiplayer game, and a new soundtrack. This DLC was not featured in Deluxe Edition.
- Path to Grandeur – published on 16 May 2017, it allows to play Turkish and Spanish campaigns, adds sandy landscapes, and Hungary and Portugal are added for multiplayer game.
- The Golden Age – released on 24 August 2017, it adds a replay of historical battles involving up to 8 players, a Dutch campaign, new single scenarios, a new soundtrack. Also, it provides Switzerland and Piedmont for multiplayer game. This DLC is featured in the Deluxe Edition.

== Reception ==
Reception

Aggregate score
Aggregator	Score
Metacritic	63/100

Cossacks 3 received "mixed or average" reviews from professional critics according to review aggregator website Metacritic – the average mark was 63 out of 100 points.

German magazine GameStar scored the game at 68 points out of 100, saying that it relies on nostalgia and that the imitation of the original does not contribute to the development of the game.
