= S.T.A.L.K.E.R. =

Video game franchise

- Genres: First-person shooter; Survival horror
- Developer: GSC Game World
- Publishers: GSC World Publishing; THQ; Deep Silver; bitComposer Games; SEGA
- Platforms: Microsoft Windows; PlayStation 4; PlayStation 5; Xbox One; Xbox Series X/S; Nintendo Switch
- First release: Shadow of Chernobyl; 20 March 2007
- Latest release: S.T.A.L.K.E.R.: Legends of the Zone Trilogy – Enhanced Edition; 20 May 2025

S.T.A.L.K.E.R. is a first-person shooter survival horror video game franchise developed by Ukrainian game developer GSC Game World. The series is set in an alternate version of the present-day Chernobyl exclusion zone in Ukraine, where, according to the series' backstory, a mysterious second Chernobyl disaster took place in 2006. As a result, the physical, chemical, and biological processes in the area were altered, spawning numerous nature-defying anomalies, artifacts, and mutants. The player takes the role of a "stalker" - a name given to trespassers and adventurers who have come to explore the exclusion zone and its strange phenomena.

The series is based on the novel Roadside Picnic by Arkady and Boris Strugatsky, and influenced by the 1979 film Stalker by Andrei Tarkovsky which was itself adapted from Roadside Picnic.

== Setting ==
Timeline of releases
2007	S.T.A.L.K.E.R.: Shadow of Chernobyl
2008	S.T.A.L.K.E.R.: Clear Sky
2009	S.T.A.L.K.E.R.: Call of Pripyat
2010
2011
2012
2013
2014
2015
2016
2017
2018
2019
2020
2021
2022
2023
2024	S.T.A.L.K.E.R. 2: Heart of Chornobyl
2025	S.T.A.L.K.E.R.: Legends of the Zone Trilogy – Enhanced Edition

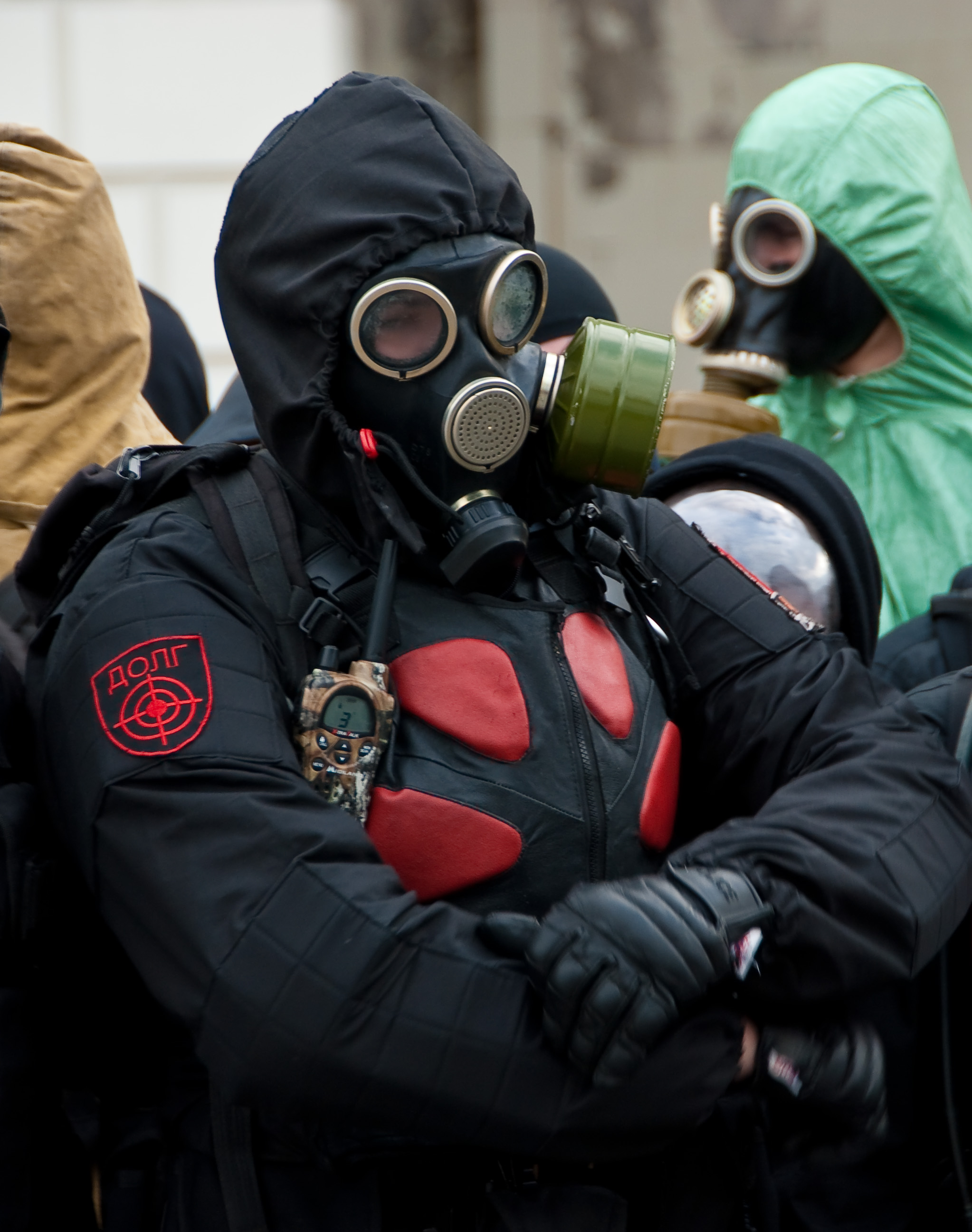
Attendees of Stalker-Fest 2009

The franchise takes place in an alternate Chernobyl exclusion zone (or "the Zone"), where a number of classified laboratories were established following the nuclear disaster of 1986. Due to the experiments conducted in these laboratories, a second catastrophe occurred in 2006, which caused physical and meteorological phenomena all over the exclusion zone and mutation of local plant and animal life. After the second disaster, the Zone grew rich with anomalies — inexplicable phenomena that do not obey the laws of physics.

The anomalies are causing artifacts to appear, which are items with unique and extraordinary properties such as anti-gravity or radioactivity absorption. People who have come to explore the Zone in search of personal enrichment such as artifacts are known as "stalkers". Many of them are working on their own, though there are several organized factions present. The Duty are a paramilitary organization that believes the Zone is a threat to humanity that must be destroyed. Conversely, members of the Freedom faction believe the Zone is a gift that should be freely accessible to all people. Bandits are wanted criminals and outlaws that have come to the Zone to hide from authorities, while the Clear Sky seek to understand the Zone, out of the context that they themselves came out of the scientist group leading the experiments that created it.

To protect the Zone from intruders, a military checkpoint known as the Cordon was established by the Ukrainian Military Forces. The military have an uneasy relationship with stalkers – while official orders are to shoot any trespassers on sight, military personnel are often bribed to look the other way. Additionally, military squads carry out operations in the Zone, such as elimination missions or securing strategic points. The most dangerous of the Zone dwellers are other stalkers, particularly a fanatical sect called the Monolith that protects the center of the Zone, and mutants, some of which possess psionic powers.

The protagonists in the series have different goals and allegiances, but often must work together. Typically, every game's primary goal is to reach the center of the Zone, with a number of adventures, dangers, and challenges on the way.

== Development ==
Development of the first S.T.A.L.K.E.R. began in the early 2000s. The project was initially known as S.T.A.L.K.E.R.: Oblivion Lost and underwent several delays before eventually being released as S.T.A.L.K.E.R.: Shadow of Chernobyl in 2007.

GSC Game World announced a sequel, S.T.A.L.K.E.R. 2, in 2010. Development was cancelled in 2012 following financial difficulties and the closure of the studio. GSC Game World resumed operations in 2014 and announced a new S.T.A.L.K.E.R. 2 project in 2018; the revived project was developed separately from the cancelled version.

Development of S.T.A.L.K.E.R. 2: Heart of Chornobyl was disrupted by the Russian invasion of Ukraine in 2022. Parts of the development team and their families were relocated, while other employees continued working from Ukraine.

== Plot ==
=== Shadow of Chernobyl (2007) ===
In the first game, the player takes on the role of an amnesiac stalker referred to as Mecheniy, or the "Marked One", tasked with killing another stalker named Strelok, or Shooter in Russian language. The protagonist uncovers clues to his past and true identity while helping other stalkers and encountering dangerous mutants. He learns about the nature and origins of the Zone by exploring mysterious underground laboratories in the area. Shadow of Chernobyl features seven endings which are dependent on multiple factors such as money earned, supporting certain factions, or how much of the protagonist's memory was pieced together.

=== Clear Sky (2008) ===
Clear Sky, the second game, is a prequel to Shadow of Chernobyl. The player assumes the role of Scar, a veteran mercenary and the lone survivor of a huge energy emission he was caught in while escorting a group of scientists through the Zone. He is rescued by and ends up working for a group calling themselves the Clear Sky, who are dedicated to researching and understanding the nature of the Zone. The player can choose to have Scar side with or against certain factions in the area to help achieve Clear Sky's goal.

=== Call of Pripyat (2009) ===
The third game, Call of Pripyat, takes place shortly after the events of Shadow of Chernobyl. Having discovered the open path to the center of the Zone, the government decides to establish control of the situation through Operation Farvater (Fairway). This includes sending a number of reconnaissance helicopters into the Zone before dispatching the main military force thoroughly. Despite these preparations, the military operation fails, with all helicopters mysteriously crashing. As a result, the Security Service of Ukraine deploys former stalker turned military operative Major Alexander Degtyarev into the Zone to investigate.

=== Heart of Chornobyl (2024) ===
Yevhen "Skif" Martynenko, a veteran of the Ukrainian Marine Corps, has returned from a three year long deployment in an unspecified conflict. He awakens to find that his apartment has been destroyed by an Anomaly mysteriously manifesting outside of the Zone, which leaves an unknown artifact. In order to earn money for a new home, he allows the scientist Professor Hermann to smuggle him into the Zone with a piece of technology called the Scanner that creates local Anomalies and can apparently "recharge" depleted Artifacts. After many misadventures and quests, Skif reaches one of four different endings depending on the player's choice of allies during the game.

== Reception ==
Aggregate review scores As of 10 November 2026.
Game	Metacritic
S.T.A.L.K.E.R.: Shadow of Chernobyl	(PC) 82
S.T.A.L.K.E.R.: Clear Sky	(PC) 75
S.T.A.L.K.E.R.: Call of Pripyat	(PC) 80
S.T.A.L.K.E.R. 2: Heart of Chornobyl	(PC) 73
S.T.A.L.K.E.R. 2: Heart of Chornobyl - Cost of Hope	(PC) 85

All but one game in the S.T.A.L.K.E.R. series had received generally positive reviews from critics. The series scored between 73 and 85 on Metacritic.

By August 2010, the franchise had sold over 4 million copies. In August 2021, GSC and Koch Media claimed over 15 million total sales for the franchise.

== Board game ==
A board game was developed by Awaken Realms titled S.T.A.L.K.E.R. The Board Game. It was announced in March 2023 and funded successfully through Gamefound in July 2023. IGN gave it a positive review and concluded: "It offers compelling gameplay and a rich setting, regardless of one's familiarity with the source material."

== Related games ==
In 2010 the first game of the Metro game series was released. Metro is another franchise of Ukrainian first-person shooter games based on the Metro 2033 literature series, which was created by some ex-members of the S.T.A.L.K.E.R. development team who left to form 4A Games in 2006 before the release of Shadow of Chernobyl.

The former S.T.A.L.K.E.R. 2 team opened a new studio, Vostok Games, in 2012. In 2015, they released a free-to-play massively multiplayer online first-person shooter game titled Survarium in the spirit of the franchise, using ideas they created for the cancelled sequel. Their next project was a battle royale game set in Chernobyl, titled Fear the Wolves.

In 2014, West-Games, which claimed to be composed of former S.T.A.L.K.E.R. core developers (according to both GSC Game World and Vostok Games, falsely) launched a Kickstarter campaign for a spiritual successor to S.T.A.L.K.E.R. first called Areal and then STALKER Apocalypse. While it managed to reach its goal of $50,000, multiple concerns were raised throughout the campaign about the project being a possible scam, and Kickstarter eventually suspended the campaign two days before its deadline, for undisclosed reasons.

In 2018, Aegis LLC began development on a Roblox project titled State of Anarchy. The game continued development up until June 6th, 2026, when lead developer Elyeuss took the game down. The removal was supposedly due to internal drama surrounding the development team, Aegis LLC. The project was republished on August 20th, 2026, under new development team.

In 2019, Alexey Sityanov, former game designer and story writer of Shadow of Chernobyl, Survarium and Sketch Tales, worked with The Farm 51 on their Kickstarter project, Chernobylite. The game features similar gameplay and themes to S.T.A.L.K.E.R, and the environment is based on the real Chernobyl exclusion zone, done by utilizing photogrammetry measurements. A stalker is introduced in the game as an antagonist, known as Black Stalker. Chernobylite released the first early access version of the game on 16 October 2019, on Steam.
