= Cossacks: European Wars =

2000 video game

- Developer: GSC Game World
- Publisher: CDV Software Entertainment
- Producer: Sergiy Grygorovych
- Designer: Alex Dragon
- Programmer: Andrew Shpagin
- Artist: Dmitry Zenin
- Composer: Andrew Prishchenko
- Platform: Microsoft Windows
- Release: UKR: 28 November 2000; UK: 30 March 2001; NA: 24 April 2001
- Genre: Real-time strategy
- Modes: Single-player, multiplayer

Cossacks: European Wars (Ukrainian: Козаки: Європейські війни) is a real-time strategy video game for Microsoft Windows made by the Ukrainian developer GSC Game World. It was released on 28 November 2000. The game has an isometric view and is set in the 17th and 18th centuries of Europe. It features sixteen playable nations each with its own architectural styles, technologies and no limit on unit numbers.

Players must avoid famine and engage in army expansion, building construction and simple resource gathering. Mission scenarios range from conflicts such as Thirty Years' War to the War of the Austrian Succession, and the game is renowned for the seemingly unlimited number of units players may control. This ability set it apart from other games of the time such as Age of Empires and Empire Earth.

Cossacks is a game which allows the user to gain strategy skills and learn history of that period by the inclusion of a comprehensive encyclopedia. The game has won two awards and was positively favoured by a majority of reviewers. It was a financial success.

== Gameplay ==
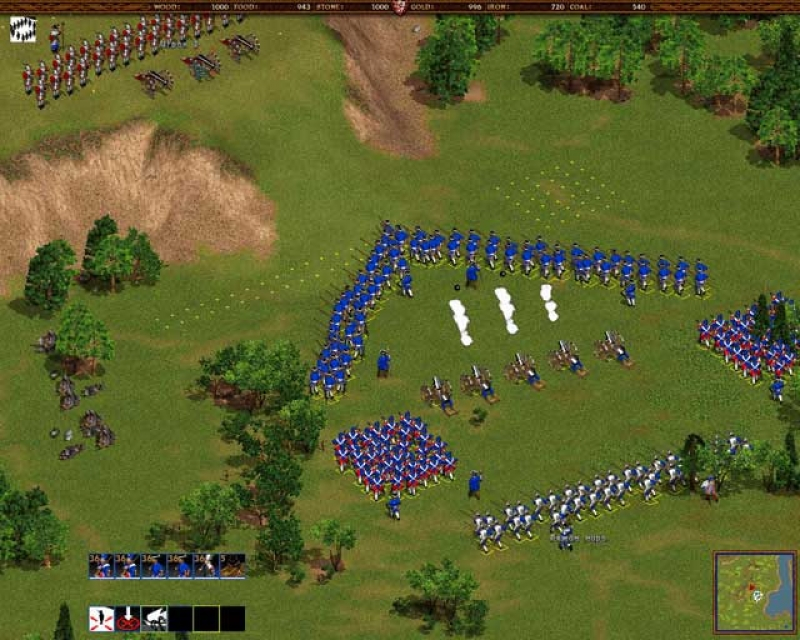
Two armies meet.

There are 6 basic resources in the game that are crucial to the player's military victory. These are gold, wood, food, stone, iron and coal. Gold, iron and coal may only be acquired by constructing mines over a designated resource area and sending peasants into them whereas food is cultivated from mills and via the use of fishing boats. Wood and stone are gathered by conventional means and there are also specific areas where these may be collected. Depending on the type of unit or structure being built, the amount of resources needed to create a unit/structure would inflate quantitatively with each successive one built or trained. Depleted resources would result in an undesirable penalty for the player such as a lack of food will signify a famine for the state and the player's units will die from lack of supplies. Similarly, a lack of coal and iron means that shooters and cannons will cease to fire their weapons whereas a lack of gold will mean that units which require maintenance paid will commit mutiny against the state. The economic workforce consists of peasants who can multitask and also attack enemy soldiers. They can, however, also be captured by enemy troops and turned to the enemy's allegiance.

Cossacks depart from common RTS titles in that military actions may be conducted by assigning formations to soldiers or allowing them to attack solitarily without proper formations. Formations may be made by grouping exactly 15, 36, 72, 120 or 196 of a single unit type in the presence of a corresponding officer and drummer. 3 different types of formations may be assumed and used for different attacking methods.

Units in formations may also be issued a 'stand ground' order where they would also be granted a defensive bonus as well as a morale improvement. Cavalry units may also be grouped into formations and function in a similar manner as would an infantry formation minus the officer and drummer units. Upgrades which affect weaponry and defensive stats can be researched in the barracks or the stables or the armories. An academy or a minaret (for various scientific research) is also needed to train officers and to build formations. There are various strategies of controlling an army developed by players during the continuous gaming online.

Artillery in the game are divided into mortars, cannons, multi-barrelled cannons and howitzers and all have distinct functions which are suitable in one situation but may not be appropriate in the next. Mortars are primarily used to bombard enemy buildings and ships from afar. The resulting shrapnel and debris upon impact on the building(s) would also kill nearby enemy units as well as the player's own if in the vicinity. Cannons are the staple of the artillery forces in Cossacks and possess good range (which can be improved with its corresponding research) and shot power but are not particularly powerful against buildings, especially after the buildings' upgrades have been researched. Cannons are also able to fire a grape shot to eradicate a cluster of enemies at short range whereas a multi-barrelled cannon (must be researched at the academy and is not available to all nations) also functions in a similar manner but reloads quicker than the cannon. Howitzers are the shortest ranged artillery but possess the best shot power. They fire in an arc which means that enemy walls will not block their ordnance. They are good against both soldiers and buildings but should be escorted by guards. All artillery units may be captured by enemy forces in the same manner as the peasant workforce. The main upgrades for artillery are the extended range, the accuracy and its build time and cost.

The player may also construct ships to wage naval battles and may build from a choice of yacht, galley, frigate or an 18th-century battleship. Nations which are historically not well-developed are restricted in the building hierarchy to just galleys. Turkey may build xebecs which are technologically equivalent to the Western powers' frigates. Ships are used for naval domination or for shore bombardment. A player may also build ferry units to prepare for a naval assault over large bodies of water. Larger ships typically require gold for upkeep and its crew would mutiny against the owner if the resource has been depleted.

Shooters (such as the musketeer and the strelets units) take time to reload their weapons after a volley and are vulnerable to a melee counter-attack. Ranged units also require a fair distance to be able to shoot at targets and will often retreat backwards to acquire the required distance. Different shooters possess different ranges while shooting and mounted dragoons do more damage than the regulars. Significant upgrades can be conducted to raise the level of damage possible and certain upgrades can also be purchased to halve the cost of producing shooters.

Grenadier units can destroy buildings with their grenades as well as engage enemies in both melee and ranged attacks. Military production buildings (e.g. barracks and stables) may only be destroyed by artillery and/or grenadier units whereas civilian buildings may be captured as per the usual means.

=== Maps ===
In Cossacks there is a multitude of playable, randomly generated maps in addition to five long campaigns which are considered extremely difficult to beat. These campaigns are historically accurate, and often pit the player against impossible odds.

=== Nations ===
- Algeria – The Algerians, like the other Islamic nation, the Ottoman Empire, cannot advance into the 18th century. They instead rely on cheap, quick-producing units and horde tactics to overwhelm their enemies. Their navy, like the Ottoman Empire's, also cannot produce frigates like the Europeans, instead their shipyards build Xebecs, which match the Europeans' 17th-century battleships. Algerians may not produce the 18th-century ship-of-the-line. The Algerian unique units are the regular Archer and the Mameluke.
- Austria – The Austrians are one of the most diverse states in the game, having unique units in both the 17th and 18th centuries. Austria produces the 17th century Musketeers (Jäger) with the most damage, regular Roundshiers, Pandurs, and Croat cavalry.
- Denmark – Danish musketeers, at least in the most current netbook version, carry grenades – although unlike the dedicated grenadier, these cannot be upgraded in power.
- England – English troops are all unique in the fact that they are readier quicker than all the other nations. English upgrades are different because they give a higher attack value earlier than other nations. The English unique units are the Highlander and the Bagpiper. The highlander is a long-ranged unit with no bayonet, and is built from the 18th-century barracks. The bagpiper is used to form 18th-century formations together with the 18th-century officer.
- France – The French specialize in musket-armed cavalry, as two of their unique units, the King's Musketeer and the 18th-century Dragoon, fall under this classification. The third French unique unit is the Chasseur, a long-ranged infantry unit without bayonets. Players playing against France should be prepared for a French charge of 18th-century Dragoons. The French dragoon is unique because it produces faster than regular dragoons, but sacrifices its firepower.
- Netherlands – Players facing the Dutch must be prepared to be rushed by Dutch 17th-century Musketeers (Harquebusier), as they are the fastest-producing units of their type. This is the only Dutch unique unit. They have lesser attack than normal Musketeers, but are cheaper. They also have the best fire rate of all 17th-century Musketeers.
- Piedmont – The Piedmontese produce Padres, the best healers in the game. They also have a 17th-century musketeer which is readier faster on its 2nd upgrade. A few Padres used with Piedmontese regular infantry is hard to take down with units that deal below 10 damage.
- Poland – Poland has four unique units, the 17th-century Musketeer, the 17th-century Pikeman, the Winged Hussar and the Light Rider. It has the highest attack rating of the light cavalry class, and is effective against both infantry and cavalry. Polish musketeers take the longest to produce, but are the cheapest and have an attack equivalent to their Austrian counterparts'. Polish 17th-century pikemen are weak, but are produced very quickly.
- Portugal – The Portuguese have no unique units, but they do, however, possess a unique building. The Portuguese Shipyard works like a tower in the fact that it may fire cannons as a defensive measure and can upgrade the number of its guns, just like a tower. Portugal has the advantage in water games where cannons, towers and walls are turned off, as its shipyard acts as a defense all by itself.
- Prussia – The Prussian unique units are the 18th-century Musketeer (Fusilier) and the Prussian Hussar. The Prussian Musketeer is powerful but expensive to create. The second Prussian unique unit, the Hussar, is a fast-building, rapid response cavalry unit.
- Russia – The land of the czars has the most number of unique units in the game at six. However, all its unique units are produced in the 17th century. Russians can produce Spearmen, special 17th-century Drummers, Commanders (instead of 17th-century officers), Don Cossacks, Vityazes, and Strelets.
- Saxony – Saxon players have access to one of the most effective 18th-century Musketeers of the game, but it is also the one with the greatest production time. Saxon players also have the Cavalry Guard, a fast-to-create, heavy-hitting, armored cavalry unit. It has very big 7th defense upgrade, +30 defense.
- Spain – The Spanish have only one unique unit, but it is readily available upon building the 17th-century barracks. The Spanish 17th-century Musketeer (Conquistador) is the only armored infantry shooter in the whole game. The Spanish musketeer also does not come equipped with a bayonet, and will retreat if enemy units come too close.
- Sweden – The army of King Gustavus Adolphus is typified by its two unique units – the Swedish rider (knekt), and the Swedish 18th-century pikeman.
- Turkey – Turks specialize in infantry, cavalry and naval units, but cannot advance into the 18th century, like the other Islamic nation, Algeria. Their unique units are the Janissary, the Spakh, the Tatar and the Turkish yacht. Turkey also produces gunpowder infantry – the Janissaries. They fire from long range, and are effective when combined with light infantry or Ottoman pikemen.
- Ukraine – Ukrainians produce five unique units – the Ukrainian Peasant, Serdiuk (shooter), and three Cossack units. The Ukrainian Peasant is the only peasant that cannot be captured. The Serdiuks are the only type of infantry that the Ukrainians can produce other than mercenaries. Ukraine is also unable to advance into the next century, much like the Muslim nations. Ukrainian Serdiuks are supposedly mercenaries themselves under the command of the Cossack Hetman, but it is the Hetman that requires gold upkeep. The other two Ukrainian unique units are the regular Sich and Register Cossacks. Sich Cossacks are the fastest cavalry units in the game, and are best used for harassing the enemy and raids. Register Cossacks are designed to mow down infantry, and are created fairly quickly. Hetman commanders are expensive, however, hetmans have a very high attack.
- Venice – The Venetians are a sea power. There is nothing noteworthy of the Venetian land army. However, Venice's one unique unit – the galleass – is emblematic might of its navy. The galleass has two types of weapons – the cannon, fired broadside from the ship, and the ship's mortars, which have a plunging fire attack of 100. The galleass is primarily intended for the shelling of fortresses from the sea, but is a jack-of-all-trades nonetheless.

== Development ==
Cossacks: European Wars was developed in Ukraine by GSC Game World. The game has been noted for artistic qualities and great graphics, in particular the special effects which were once described as "second to none". Another remarkable feat is the technology tree having more than 300 upgrades.

Desires to create the game Cossacks began in 1997, when Age of Empires was published, and development started in 1998. The 17th and 18th centuries were selected because the most obvious continuation of Age of Empires would be medieval Europe and Cossacks was its logical successor, not a competitor. At first, Cossacks was supposed to be about the confrontation in Ukraine and Russia and there would be four nations: Ukraine, Russia, Europe and Turkey. The game would be sold in the domestic market. After the exhibition MILIA in Cannes, where a demo version of Cossacks had received good reviews from reputable people associated with the creation and publishing house of computer games, it was decided to increase the number of nations to 16 and sell the game around the world. In order to be able to play on the map with thousands of units, 2D graphics were selected.

The number of people who developed the game was increased from four in 1998 to twelve in 2000, when the project was nearing completion. At different stages of the work, authors of maps and testers joined the development. In March 2001, Cossacks: European Wars appeared in stores.

The game was re-released in 2011 on the Steam platform, along with its sequel Cossacks II. The games are also available DRM-free from GOG.com.

== Expansions ==
=== Cossacks: The Art of War ===
The Art of War, released on 1 April 2002, is the first standalone expansion pack. Like the original Cossacks, the game is set in the 17th and 18th centuries, and 8000 units can be controlled. Cossacks: The Art of War adds 5 new campaigns, 2 new nations (namely Denmark and Bavaria), a map editor, and 16 times larger maps with new terrains. Both new nations possess an 18th-century Musketeer unit, which have different attributes.

=== Cossacks: Back to War ===
Back to War, released on 18 October 2002, is the second expansion pack, and it can be played as a standalone. Cossacks: Back to War adds two new nations (Switzerland and Hungary) to the choices from Cossacks: European Wars and Cossacks: Art of War because of their influence on European history. There are also new maps, a tutorial campaign and a map-editor. Cossacks: Back to War comes with a mod on the CD called Mod1 or Baddog's mod, developed by Shaun Fletcher, it adds several units to various countries, new cannon types and alters some parameters such as building time, upgrade and building costs.

==== Cossacks: Campaign Expansion ====
Cossacks: Campaign Expansion, released on 1 November 2002, is a piece of downloadable content for Cossacks: Back to War. It contains four single-player campaigns from the original game, Cossacks: European Wars, and five from The Art of War: nine campaigns with 63 hardcore missions.

== Reception ==
=== Sales ===
John Bye of Eurogamer described Cossacks: European Wars as a "massive hit". Publisher CDV Software told investors that the game was "very successful" through the end of 2000, after its release late that year. It sold well in Russia, where consumers purchased over 300,000 units by December 2001. It was also popular in Britain, reaching #1 on the sales charts and selling roughly 100,000 copies by that date, according to GSC Game World. The United Kingdom's Entertainment and Leisure Software Publishers Association (ELSPA) ultimately gave Cossacks a "Silver" sales award in September 2002, for 100,000 sales in the region. Conversely, the developers were let down by the game's poor performance in the United States, where it launched at #8 on NPD Intelect's computer game sales chart for the week of 29 April 2001. It was absent by its second week. By May 2004, Cossacks had sold above 150,000 units in France alone.

Cossacks' initial performance in the German market pleased CDV. The title debuted at #5 on Media Control's computer game sales chart for December 2000, and proceeded to place fifth, fourth and seventh over the following three months, respectively. The Verband der Unterhaltungssoftware Deutschland (VUD) presented the game with a "Gold" award in July 2001, indicating sales of at least 100,000 units across Germany, Austria and Switzerland. By October, the game had held in Media Control's top 30 for 11 consecutive months, retaining 11th in September and 18th in October.

Cossacks sold above 500,000 units globally by December 2001. This success made it one of CDV's biggest titles at the time, alongside Sudden Strike. Sales surpassed 650,000 units by September 2002, while the overall Cossacks series topped 1 million units by the end of that year. The franchise surpassed 2.5 million sales by early 2005.

=== Critical reviews ===
Reception

Aggregate scores
Aggregator	Score
GameRankings	78%
Metacritic	74/100

Review scores
Publication	Score
Eurogamer	8/10
GameSpot	7.1/10
IGN	7.5/10
Next Generation	4/5
PC Zone	8.9/10
ESC Magazine	9/10

Reviews for Cossacks: European Wars range from fair to good. Cossacks: European Wars received a PC Zone award for excellence and the Strategy Player Game of the Month award.

Reviewers generally praised the detail and accuracy during gameplay and felt the cut scenes and opening video were impressive. A GameSpot review noted how the game followed the traditional formula of the RTS genre, exhibiting significant similarities to Age of Empires II: The Age of Kings but that the diverse types of factions and military units added to the replayability. Another conclusion was that some of the larger scenarios can be quite daunting due to having to manage many resources and a large fighting force. A review in ESC Magazine described it as a complex game with many mouse clicks and fast artificial intelligence for computer opponents.

A review by IGN staff concluded that the game's depth, potential and lasting appeal were its strong points but poor design decisions detracted from its playability. They also thought the artificial intelligence was below par, as the variable defensive abilities of their forces resulted in significant imbalances. The PC Zone review described the game's graphics as detailed and impressive, and liked the historical accuracy, smooth unit movement and 3D landscapes.

John Lee reviewed the PC version of the game for Next Generation, rating it four stars out of five, and stated that "Like an old movie poster, this carnival of carnage can claim 'a cast of thousands' – as well as adjectives like 'thrilling,' 'sweeping,' and, occasionally, 'glorious.'"

The editors of Computer Games Magazine nominated Cossacks as the best real-time strategy game of 2001, but ultimately gave the award to Kohan: Immortal Sovereigns.

== Related games ==
Two sequels were released: Cossacks II: Napoleonic Wars in 2005 and Cossacks 3 in 2016. There is a spin-off of Cossacks from GSC Game World using the same engine, American Conquest. GSC Game World developed Alexander for Ubisoft in 2004, a less successful strategy PC game based on the movie Alexander. Also to be noted is the real-time strategy role-playing game Heroes of Annihilated Empires released in 2006; which, owing to poor AI, became a less successful project.
