= S.T.A.L.K.E.R.: Clear Sky =

2008 video game

- Developer: GSC Game World
- Publishers: UKR: GSC World Publishing; WW: Deep Silver
- Director: Anton Bolshakov
- Producer: Serhii Hryhorovych
- Designers: Iurii Nehrobov; Ruslan Didenko
- Programmer: Dmytro Iasieniev
- Artist: Illia Tolmachov
- Composers: MoozE; Alexey Omelchuk
- Series: S.T.A.L.K.E.R.
- Engine: X-Ray Engine
- Platforms: Windows; PlayStation 4; Xbox One; Nintendo Switch; PlayStation 5; Xbox Series X/S
- Release: Windows: RU: 22 August 2008; UKR: 29 August 2008; AU: 4 September 2008; EU: 5 September 2008; NA: 15 September 2008; PS4, Xbox One: WW: 6 March 2024; Nintendo Switch: WW: 31 October 2024; PS5, Xbox Series X/S: WW: 20 May 2025
- Genres: First-person shooter, survival horror
- Modes: Single-player, multiplayer

S.T.A.L.K.E.R.: Clear Sky (Ukrainian: S.T.A.L.K.E.R.: Чисте небо) is a 2008 first-person shooter survival horror video game with role-playing elements. It was developed by GSC Game World and published by Deep Silver as a prequel to S.T.A.L.K.E.R.: Shadow of Chernobyl.

The player assumes the identity of Scar, a mercenary tasked with stopping a group of Stalkers from reaching the center of the Chernobyl exclusion zone, a forbidden territory surrounding the Chernobyl Nuclear Power Plant. The game uses much of the same regions as Shadow of Chernobyl, while introducing several new areas such as the abandoned town of Limansk. S.T.A.L.K.E.R.: Clear Sky introduces features to the series, including the ability to customize weapon and armor, as well as participate in faction wars.

A third game, S.T.A.L.K.E.R.: Call of Pripyat was released in 2009 as a sequel to Shadow of Chernobyl.

== Gameplay ==
This game combines elements of first-person shooters ("twitch-based" aiming, with a first-person perspective), survival horror (ammo-scavenging in a frightening atmosphere with powerful monsters), and role-playing video games (inventory management, quests, character interaction, armor types, and defense stats).

The most significant gameplay addition since Shadow of Chernobyl is the faction wars system. Different factions will struggle for territory, attacking to gain territory and then defending to keep it, while others then try to retake it. The player will be able to join and help factions in their battles. The stronger a faction becomes, the better equipment the traders can provide and their soldiers can use. The player character is a mercenary, and may do missions for any faction or remain completely neutral without disrupting the necessary progression of the game. Each of the main factions provide services, most importantly access to a trader and an engineer.

While Scar is always aligned with Clear Sky, and his ultimate goal is to defeat Strelok, he can fight against or ally with the four other factions in the Zone (Loners, Duty, Freedom, and Bandits). The Swamp-dwelling Renegades or the Military factions cannot be joined. Careful choice of faction alignment needs to be considered in some parts of the story, for it may be difficult to progress further if the Stalker who the player is interacting with is hostile, has needed information, or is essential to triggering the next stage.

Other gameplay advancements since the first game include a deepened weapon customization system with the ability to repair damaged gear and add modifications that improve weapons and suits. Anomalies are harder to notice and now contain the artifacts in the game, which require a detector to locate. Non-player characters are given the ability to use hand grenades, take cover dynamically, and use "blind-fire" techniques. Light machine guns have been introduced. There are guides in the zone who will provide fast-travel for a fee. Emissions, powerful waves that are sometimes visible or invisible (determinant by intensity), unleash lethal radiation, psi-emissions, and other unknown particles and energy directly from the Chernobyl Nuclear Power Plant, directly affecting the Noosphere in the Chernobyl exclusion zone, making it deadly to all lifeforms except specific mutants. Emissions also occur on an infrequent basis, requiring the player to take cover in a building or underground area pointed out by the PDA. If not adequately concealed, the player's nervous system shuts down, resulting in the player's death.

== Plot ==
While guiding a group of scientists through the Zone, Scar faints during a high energy emission. Scar, the only one to survive, is then rescued by Clear Sky, a secret independent Zone faction dedicated to researching and learning about the Zone in their attempt to better understand it and its related phenomena. It is not known how Scar has survived the emission, but it is noted he has suffered damage to his central nervous system and seems to exhibit other, subtle physiological changes.

The nature of these changes becomes clear shortly. Word arrives that a platoon of Stalkers has come under attack by mutants, and Lebedev, leader of the Clear Sky faction, asks Scar to seek them out and help them. During the rescue attempt another emission occurs with little warning, giving Scar and the Stalkers no time to seek cover. Once again Scar is the sole survivor, recovering shortly after the emission dies down. Lebedev is amazed that Scar is still alive; the Clear Sky lead researcher, Beanpolev, believes that Scar has acquired some "unusual ability" that allows him to navigate and survive anomalies and parts of the Zone that would normally kill any ordinary man.

Lebedev begins to theorize that the Zone is being disrupted by a dramatic increase in energy emissions, emanating from the Chernobyl Nuclear Power Plant in the center of the Zone. The emissions are a sort of "immune response" to an outside force that the Zone perceives as a threat. Lebedev believes this outside force to be a group of Stalkers who are reportedly making an attempt to reach the center of the Zone, and have made it further than any other group of Stalkers before. Both Lebedev and Chebekov fear that the Zone's reaction may cause untold destruction should the group succeed. Scar is asked to seek out this group and stop them at all costs.

Scar is sent to the Cordon, an area near the edge of the Zone, to get further information about the group of Stalkers. The trader Sidorovich is able to identify the four-member group of Stalkers as Fang, Ghost, Doc, and Strelok and gives Scar a lead on locating Fang. Scar follows this lead to another, and another, following a trail of leads to encounters with multiple factions of Stalkers across a large area of the Zone. Eventually Scar tracks the group's progress to Yantar, the site of a Brain Scorcher, where he learns from a scientist that Strelok has just recently obtained a prototype psionic shielding unit which should protect him from the mind-damaging effects of the Brain Scorcher surrounding the Chernobyl NPP.

Scar nearly catches Strelok in the Red Forest, only for him to escape into a tunnel leading towards Chernobyl, which is immediately collapsed behind him by an explosion. With the assistance of some recently rescued Mercenaries and the Clear Sky faction, Scar captures a nearby bridge to Limansk from bandits, which provides an alternate route to Chernobyl. Progress through Limansk is impeded by bandits, the Ukrainian military, and the cult-like Monolith faction, which seeks to kill anybody approaching the center of the Zone.

After proceeding through Limansk and finding an alternate route through the partially underground ruins of a hospital, Scar arrives at Chernobyl along with Lebedev and other members of Clear Sky. Strelok has already arrived and is progressing towards the sarcophagus surrounding the number four reactor. While Clear Sky battles with Monolith forces on the ground, Lebedev gives Scar a prototype "EM1 rifle", a long-range electromagnetic weapon, and instructs him to use the weapon to disable Strelok's psionic protection. Battling Monolith forces himself, Scar nonetheless is able to succeed. With the "threat" eliminated Lebedev anticipates a sudden settling of the Zone, but instead Zone activity increases dramatically and the plant releases an emission which incapacitates everyone in the immediate area. Scar's fate is left unknown, but since at a later time, Strelok appears as an amnesiac for the beginning events of Shadow of Chernobyl, it is conceivable that Scar survived.

The ending shows Strelok waking up in a dimly lit hallway lined with other Stalkers sitting slouched against either wall, semi-comatose. Each Stalker is facing a stripped down display which shows a series of cryptic images, part of their brainwashing process to lose their memory. Strelok himself is also in the process of being brainwashed. The view then moves to focus on Strelok's exposed right arm, which has been tattooed with the acronym "S.T.A.L.K.E.R."

== Development and release ==
=== X-Ray 1.5 Engine ===
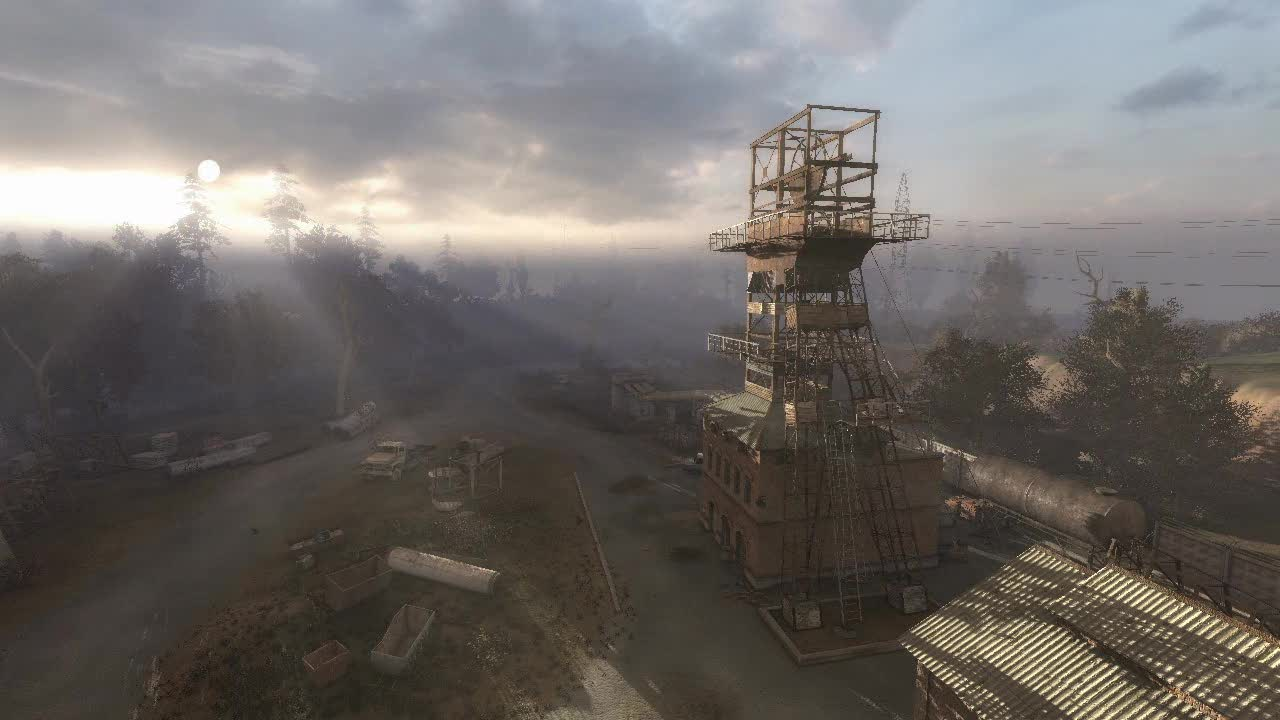
Crepuscular rays effect

Advancements made in 1.5 include volumetric light, dynamic volumetric smoke, full volumetric fire, soft water, dynamic wet surfaces (with water streaming down the sides of surfaces), depth-of-field blur, DirectX 10 support, SSAO (Screen Space Ambient Occlusion). A complete day and night system is included along with improved weather effects.

However, the game will maintain the same minimum system requirements as Shadow of Chernobyl, and is scalable enough to run on outdated DirectX 8 hardware. The engine's revamp has allowed for improved and increased performance on most systems. Version 1.5.03 of the game supports MSAA for DirectX 10, while version 1.5.06 added support for DirectX 10.1.

In August 2014 the game's X-Ray Engine 1.5.10 source code became available on GitHub under a non-open-source license.

=== Copy protection ===
Stalker: Clear Sky uses the digital rights management (DRM) software Tagès as copy prevention. Some versions can only be installed on a limited number of machines (5). It has been disabled via patches.

=== Special editions ===
Separate limited edition versions of the game were released in conjunction with the standard version.

The Russian limited edition is presented in a larger box and contains the game disc, a bonus disc, a neckerchief, an A2-sized map of the Zone, a patch with a logo of one of the game's factions, a dog tag, a custom lighter and a little white ball called "The Clear Sky Artifact".

The second limited edition, released in the rest of the world, is presented in a metal box and also contains a bonus disc filled with extras (such as bonus artwork, screen savers, making of videos, a five-part interview with Oleg Yavorsky the PR Director for GSC Game World and the soundtrack) and the A2-sized map of the Zone.

The Polish limited edition, presented in a medkit-like bag with the game's logo contains the game disc, soundtrack, patch with logo of one of the game's factions, stickers with logos, small map of the Zone, T-shirt with game's logo on chest and inscription "Сделано в Чернобыле" ("Made in Chernobyl") on the back.

== Reception ==
Reception

Aggregate score
Aggregator	Score
Metacritic	75/100

Review scores
Publication	Score
1Up.com	B
Edge	7/10
Eurogamer	7/10
Game Informer	7.75/10
GameSpot	7/10
GameTrailers	6.9/10
GameZone	7.5/10
IGN	(US) 7.3/10 (UK) 7/10
PC Gamer (US)	78%
PC PowerPlay	9/10

The game received "generally favourable reviews" according to the review aggregation website Metacritic, although not to the extent S.T.A.L.K.E.R.: Shadow of Chernobyl received. Edge opined the game "turns the best and worst of PC gaming into something extraordinary."
