= List of Windows Mobile Professional games =

This is a list of games released for the Windows Mobile Professional operating system (formerly known as Pocket PC).

== 0-9 ==
- 4Pinball - Limelight Software Limited

== A ==
- Aces Texas Hold'em - No Limit - Concrete Software, Inc. (2004)
- Aces Texas Hold'em - Limit - Concrete Software, Inc. (2004)
- Aces Omaha - Concrete Software, Inc. (2005)
- Aces Blackjack - Concrete Software, Inc. (2006)
- Aces Tournament Timer - Concrete Software, Inc. (2006)
- Add-Venture - Qsoftz (2006)
- Atomic Battle Dragons - Isotope 244 (2006)
- Age of Empires Gold edition - Microsoft, ZIO Interactive
- Age of Empires III - Microsoft, Glu Mobile
- Atomic Cannon - Isotope 244 (2003)
- Azgard Defence - MoreGames Entertainment

== B ==
- Baccarat - Midas Interactive Entertainment (2003)
- Bass Guitar Hero - www.iPocketPC.net (2009)
- Batty - Applian Technologies (1999)
- Bejeweled 2 - Astraware (2006) - Also known as Diamond Mine 2
- Bingo - Midas Interactive Entertainment (2003)
- Blackjack - Midas Interactive Entertainment (2003)
- Blaster - Fognog (1999)
- Break My Bricks - www.iPocketPC.net (2009)
- Burning Sand 2 - (2009)
- Blade of Betrayal - HPT Interactive (2003)

== C ==
- Call of Duty 2 - Mforma (2006)
- Call of Duty 2 Pocket PC Edition - Aspyr (2007)
- Caribbean Poker - Midas Interactive Entertainment (2003)
- Constructo Combat - Concrete Software, Inc. (2006)
- Craps - Midas Interactive Entertainment (2003)
- Cubis - Astraware (2003)

== D ==
- Diamond Mine - Astraware (2002)
- Domination - Smart-Thinker
- Dopewars - Jennifer Glover (2000)
- Dragon Bane II - Mythological Software (2003)
- Dragon Bird
- Drum Kit Ace - Momentum Games (2006)

== F ==
- Fade - Fade Team
- Fish Tycoon - Last Day of Work (2004)
- Fruit Bomb - Momentum Games (2004)

== G ==
- Glyph - Astraware (2006)
- Gold Mine - Momentum Games (2004)
- Guitar Hero III Mobile - Glu Mobile (2009)

== H ==
- Harry Putter's Crazy Golf - Limelight Software
- Hoyle Puzzle & Board Games 2005 - VU Games (2004)

== I ==
- Insaniquarium - Astraware (2003)
- Intelli Cube - Midas Interactive Entertainment (2003)
- Interstellar Flames - XEN Games

== J ==
- Jawbreaker - Oopdreams Software, Inc. (2003)
- JIGaSAWrus - Limelight Software

== K ==
- K-Rally - Infinite Dreams Inc.

== L ==
- Lawn Darts - Concrete Software, Inc. (2007)
- Lemonade Inc. (aka Lemonade Tycoon) - Hexacto Games (2002)
- Leo's Flight Simulator
- Leo's Space Combat Simulator

== M ==
- Machines at War - Isotope 244 (2007)
- Madden NFL 2005 - Mobile Digital Media (2005)
- Marble Worlds 2 - Limelight Software
- Metalion - ZIO Interactive (2001)
- Metalion 2 - ZIO Interactive (2003)
- Microsoft Entertainment Pack 2004 - Microsoft Game Studios (2004)
- Monopoly - Infogrames (2002)
- Multi Machine - Midas Interactive Entertainment (2003)
- My Little Tank - Astraware (2005)
- Mystery of the Pharaoh - Midas Interactive Entertainment (2003)

== O ==
- Orions: Deckmasters - MoreGames Entertainment
- Orions: Legend of Wizards - MoreGames Entertainment
- Orions: The Second Age - MoreGames Entertainment
- Ouch! - Truth in Design

== Q ==
- Quake - Pulse Interactive, Inc (2004)
- Quake III Arena - noctemware (2005)
- The Quest (2006)

== P ==
- PBA Bowling - Concrete Software, Inc. (2008)
- Plant Tycoon - Last Day of Work (2004)
- Pocket Humanity - Alexis Laferriere (2005)
- Pocket UFO - SMK Software (2006)
- Pocket Mini Golf - Momentum Games (2003)
- Pocket Mini Golf 2 - Momentum Games (2005)
- Pop Drop - Momentum Games (2005)
- PT CatchFish - PlayfulTurtle.com (2007)
- PT PuzzleChase - PlayfulTurtle.com (2008)

== R ==
- Red Sector 2112 - Limelight Software
- Reversi - Midas Interactive Entertainment (2003)
- Roulette - Midas Interactive Entertainment (2003)
- RocketElite - Digital Concepts
- Royal 21 - Fury Ultd. (2009)

== S ==
- Scrabble - Handmark (2006)
- Seven Seas - Astraware (2003)
- Shadow of Legend - SmartCell Technology, LLC (2007–2008, no longer available now) - 2D Fantasy MMORPG game.
- SimCity 2000 - ZIO Interactive (1999) - A port of the popular SimCity 2000 game.
- Sink My Ships - www.iPocketPC.net (2009) - An awesome clone of Battleship.
- Sky Force Reloaded - Infinite Dreams Inc. (2006)
- Slot Machine - Midas Interactive Entertainment (2003)
- Snails - Futech Ltd.
- Sokoban - XComsoft Ltd
- Solitaire
- Spb AirIslands - SPB Software (2006)
- Spb Brain Evolution - SPB Software (2007)
- StarPop - Astraware (2006)
- Strategic Assault - XEN Games (1998)
- Sudoku - Diladele (2006)
- Super Elemental

== T ==
- TextTwist - Astraware
- Tic Tac Toe - www.iPocketPC.net (2009)
- Tomb Raider - Eidos Interactive (2002)
- Tower of Hanoi - Midas Interactive Entertainment (2003)
- Tony Hawk's Pro Skater 2 - Activision
- Tradewinds - Astraware
- Tripeaks Solitaire - Diladele (2006)
- Turjah - Jimmy Software
- Turjah 2 - Jimmy Software (2002)

== U ==
- Ultima Underworld - ZIO Interactive
- UNO - Concrete Software, Inc. (2007)
- UNO Free Fall - Concrete Software, Inc. (2007)

== V ==
- Video Poker - Midas Interactive Entertainment (1999)

== W ==
- Warfare Incorporated - Spiffcode
- WordPlay - Limelight Software
- Worms World Party - Team17 (2001)

== X ==
- Xwords - Open Source word game
- X Ranger

== Z ==
- Zuma - PopCap
