= Virtual Villagers =

- Virtual Villagers: A New Home promotional artwork
- Developer: Last Day of Work
- Publisher: Last Day of Work
- Designer: Arthur K. Humphrey
- Engine: Custom
- Platforms: Windows, Mac OS X, Nintendo DS, iOS, Palm OS (A New Home)
- Release: A New Home; July 18, 2006; The Lost Children; March 16, 2007; The Secret City; May 15, 2008; The Tree of Life; February 22, 2010; New Believers; December 30, 2010; Origins 2 November 15, 2017; Divine Destiny; August 2, 2024
- Genres: Life simulation, God game, Social simulation
- Mode: Single player

Virtual Villagers is a series of village simulator video games created and developed by Last Day of Work, an independent video game developer and publisher. Each game contains puzzles the player must complete to uncover the ethnic and cultural backgrounds surrounding fictional Polynesian island called Isola (EE-zoh-la). There are five portions to the island in which the game is set, representing the cardinal points and center of the compass.

There are five games in the series: Virtual Villagers: A New Home, Virtual Villagers 2: The Lost Children, Virtual Villagers 3: The Secret City, Virtual Villagers 4: The Tree of Life, and Virtual Villagers 5: New Believers. The series was originally released for Windows with Virtual Villagers: A New Home later released for Mac OS X and for mobile devices. A spin-off of the series, Virtual Villagers Origins 2, was released for iOS and Android devices on 15 November 2017.

== Gameplay ==
Natives from an unnamed island have lived in peace for many years, but their livelihood is threatened when a volcano erupts and destroys their home. The survivors flee and discover another island called Isola, where they make their new home. There, they must uncover the secrets and puzzles of Isola and create a thriving village.

The player makes choices that shape the village's progress, including choosing preferred skill sets for each villager, researching technologies, and dragging villagers to points of interest on the map.

== Virtual Villagers: A New Home ==
=== Synopsis ===
A few villagers flee their island on boat to escape erupting volcano. They crash into the southern shore of a new island, which they name Isola, and start their civilization anew. They recover ancient abandoned monuments and revive the culture practiced by the previous tribe. Eventually, a mother gives birth to a magical "golden child" who never ages and who possesses magical powers. The golden child uncovers many of the other mysteries of the island including removing the boulder blocking a secret cave at the edge of the village.

=== Remastered Editions ===
The game was released as Virtual Villagers: Origins with more options for iOS in April 2012 and later for Android devices. Village Sim was the edition released for the pocket PC.

== Virtual Villagers 2: The Lost Children ==
=== Synopsis ===
Two curious villagers are selected from the established tribe from Virtual Villagers: A New Home and explore the uncovered cave at the edge of the village. They find themselves on the western shore of Isola, discovering a small group of abandoned children. The villagers attempt to build a society anew and slowly uncover cliff wall engravings that explain where the previous villagers had disappeared to. They also repair a dismantled Gong that, when rung, provides several gifts to the village.

== Virtual Villagers 3: The Secret City ==
=== Synopsis ===
With their village getting overcrowded, a family is selected to venture to the northern shore of Isola, where they find an abandoned city. The villagers find refuge there and restore the former glory of the city. They organize and establish an alchemy lab, repair huts and ancient structures, and discover artifacts. While uncovering rubble leading to a cave, the villagers learn of an ancient feud between rivaling tribes practicing magic or embracing nature. The villagers recover three crystals that open a large embellished cliff door, where, upon solving a final puzzle, an apparition of the previous tribe's prince and princess appear, explaining the history of the tribe and how a forbidden marriage led to a war.

== Virtual Villagers 4: The Tree of Life ==
In contrast to previous games in the series, The Tree of Life permits players to choose the starting members of their tribe, which comprises five people. Similar to previous games, there are 16 achievements, called "puzzles", to be earned. In addition, the game's graphics were remodeled, featuring an updated user interface and a detailed hand-drawn map.

=== Synopsis ===
Several generations have coexisted with the island in happiness and peace. In a turn of events, the fauna of the island has begun to diminish and, as such, the chieftain of the villagers sends an expedition to investigate the causation of this phenomenon. The expedition party stumbles to the eastern shore of the island, where a clearing with an enormous dying banyan tree, dubbed the Tree of Life, is found, thought to be the source of the decline in fauna. The villagers begin a new village while solving puzzles, and learn that the magic of the island of Isola was founded by and resonated with the growth of the tree. As the tree started to wilt from a curse, the magic on the island also started to decline. The villagers tend to the tree by completing several tasks, eventually healing the tree.

== Virtual Villagers 5: New Believers ==
=== Synopsis ===
The villagers discover a mask found on the edge of a forbidden path leading into the forest. When a group of villagers go to investigate, they are captured and imprisoned by a group of masked heathens. Once captured, the villagers find the heathens are passive to their actions. They break out of their bamboo prison and explore the heathen's disorganized city. The heathens have installed sacred totems that the villagers tear down in order to progress in their own chosen fields of study as well to restore broken structures and rediscover sacred artifacts. All the while, the villagers attempt to convert all the heathen villagers back to believing in their ancient ways.

From the stories of a master heathen who is converted, he recounts how the "heathens" were Isola natives from the era before the newcomers arrived in A New World. Damaged emotionally by the tragic events revealed in The Secret City, where a war emerges between rivaling tribes and fractures the tribe, the survivors lose hope and become fearful and superstitious and built another city reflecting their despair.

Eventually, the villagers, with the help of a divine guiding force, convert all of the village elders, who each has a piece of a necklace. The necklace is put together and given to the heathen tribal chief, and it is revealed that the necklace was once his daughter's. He lets go of his loss and looks toward the future. The chief then joins the tribe, donating his skills and attempts to enlighten others.

== Virtual Villagers Origins 2 ==
Virtual Villagers Origins 2 was announced in June 2017 and released for iOS and Android devices on the 15th of November 2017, and for PC on Steam on the 26th of October, 2018. Unlike Virtual Villagers Origins, it is not a remake of a past game, but has improved graphics, a larger map, more in depth gameplay, and the ability to craft items in comparison to previous released versions.

=== Synopsis ===
After a volcanic eruption threatens the residents of the island of Asura, a family escapes to Isola in search of refuge. The family is greeted by a strange man who guides the family as they explore their new world. As they build another village and solve puzzles, the family discovers the history behind Isola, which was once a home to a thriving civilization but has devolved to ruins and untamed jungle. The villagers must also contend with a mystical Kraken that emerges from the central pond near a Kraken-themed statue.

== Virtual Villagers 6: Divine Destiny ==
On February 26, 2024, the sixth installment in the Virtual Villagers series, Virtual Villagers: Divine Destiny, was announced on the official Virtual Villagers Facebook page. The announcement sought beta testers for the game (Android devices running Android 9 (Pie) as a minimum) and was limited to 100 players. It was then released for Android on August 2nd, 2024 and for IOS on August 14th, 2024.

Virtual Villagers 6: Divine Destiny sees the villagers of Isola once again guided by a divine force. Their island is beset by a Sorcerer who curses the land creating rifts in the fabric of reality, and turning animals into monsters. As the game progresses, the Villagers use the power of their divine guide to remove the curses around their island, rebuild a ruined shipyard, and expand to new islands. Over multiple islands in the Isolan archipelago, the villagers build ever more clever technologies and design a magical Golem-like protector, The Jade Guardian. The Jade Guardian battles the Sorcerer, and with a mighty punch, sends him flying into the atmosphere. The villagers celebrate, and the story is finished.

== Reception ==
Virtual Villagers: A New Home has received a number of awards, including a Zeeby Award for Best Simulation Game of 2006 and the Best Sim Game of 2006 Award from website Game Tunnel. The game received two "Highly Commended" awards from the 2006 GameShadow Innovation in Games Awards, in the Best Casual Game category and the ATi Crossfire People's Choice Award category. The Academy of Interactive Arts & Sciences nominated Virtual Villagers: A New Home for "Downloadable Game of the Year" at the 10th Annual Interactive Achievement Awards.

== Spinoffs ==
There are also two other little-known, yet directly related, spin-off games: Fish Tycoon and Plant Tycoon. Both are of an entirely different genre than the style of all other Virtual Villagers games, but are acknowledged to be directly linked.
