= LOGNet =

The Army Logistics Network (LOGNet) is an online forum for United States Army logistical professionals that was implemented in 2006. It is part of the Battle Command Knowledge System (BCKS) network.

LOGNet is a U.S. Army-wide Logistics Network and enterprise level knowledge system that supports knowledge flow throughout the logistics community. It is a Community of Practice (CoP) for logisticians maintained by the Combined Arms Support Command, Fort Gregg-Adams, Virginia. The CoP is based on Tomoye technology, a Canadian based company which in 2010 was acquired by NewsGator.

The LOGNet Community of Practice promotes and enhances collaboration, communication and knowledge sharing among logisticians and combat troops. LOGNet is a networked system of Structured Professional Forums, knowledge centers and supporting toolkits that combine to provide an enterprise system for generation, management and application of knowledge products.

LOGNet's ultimate goal is to transform the Army Logistics Community into a learning and teaching organization more highly skilled in the practice of providing superior Combat Service Support to the Army.
