= Massively multiplayer online game =

Multiplayer video game with a large number of players

A massively multiplayer online (MMO) game, abbreviated as MMOG or MMO, is a type of online video game that allows a large number of players to simultaneously interact in the same game server. MMOs often feature a huge and persistent open world, although there are games that differ. These games can be played on most network-capable platforms, including the personal computer, video game console, or smartphones and other mobile devices.

== History ==
The most popular type of MMOs, and the subgenre that pioneered the category, is the massively multiplayer online role-playing game (MMORPG), which descended from university mainframe computer MUD and adventure games such as Rogue and Dungeon on the PDP-10. These games predate the commercial gaming industry and the Internet, but still featured persistent worlds and other elements of MMOs still used today.

The first graphical MMO, and a major milestone in the creation of the genre, was the multiplayer flight combat simulation game Air Warrior by Kesmai on the GEnie online service, which first appeared in 1986. Kesmai later added 3D graphics to the game, making it the first 3D MMO.

Commercial MMORPGs gained acceptance in the late 1980s and early 1990s. The genre was pioneered by the GemStone series on GEnie, also created by Kesmai, and Neverwinter Nights, the first such game to include graphics, which debuted on AOL in 1991.

As video game developers applied MMORPG ideas to other computer and video game genres, new acronyms started to develop, such as MMORTS. MMO emerged as a generic term to cover this growing class of games.

The debuts of The Realm Online, Meridian 59 (the first 3D MMORPG), Castle Infinity (the first kid-focused MMORPG), Ultima Online, Underlight and EverQuest in the late 1990s popularized the MMORPG genre. The growth in technology meant that where Neverwinter Nights in 1991 had been limited to 50 simultaneous players (a number that grew to 500 by 1995), by 2000 a multitude of MMORPGs was each serving thousands of simultaneous players and led the way for games such as World of Warcraft and EVE Online.

Despite the genre's focus on multiplayer gaming, AI-controlled characters are still common. NPCs and mobs who give out quests or serve as opponents are typical in MMORPGs. AI-controlled characters are not as common in action-based MMOs.

The popularity of MMOs was mostly restricted to the computer game market until the sixth-generation consoles, with the launch of Phantasy Star Online on the Dreamcast, as well as the emergence and growth of the online service Xbox Live. There have been a number of console MMOs, including EverQuest Online Adventures (PlayStation 2), and the multi-console Final Fantasy XI. On PCs, the MMO market has always been dominated by successful fantasy MMORPGs.

MMOs have only recently begun to break into the mobile phone market. The first, Samurai Romanesque set in feudal Japan, was released in 2001 on NTT DoCoMo's iMode network in Japan. More recent developments are CipSoft's TibiaME and Biting Bit's MicroMonster, which features online and bluetooth multiplayer gaming. SmartCell Technology is in development of Shadow of Legend, which will allow gamers to continue their game on their mobile device when away from their PC.

Science fiction has also been a popular theme, featuring games such as Mankind, Anarchy Online, Eve Online, Star Wars Galaxies and The Matrix Online.

MMOs emerged from the hard-core gamer community to the mainstream strongly in December 2003, with an analysis in the Financial Times measuring the value of the virtual property in the then-largest MMO, EverQuest, to result in a per-capita GDP of 2,266 dollars, which would have placed the virtual world of EverQuest as the 77th wealthiest nation, on par with Croatia, Ecuador, Tunisia or Vietnam.

World of Warcraft is a dominant MMO with 8-9 million monthly subscribers worldwide. The subscriber base dropped by one million after the expansion Wrath of the Lich King, bringing it to nine million subscribers in 2010, though it remained the most popular Western title among MMOs. In 2008, Western consumer spending on World of Warcraft represented a 58% share of the subscription MMO market in 2009. The title has generated over $2.2 billion in cumulative consumer spending on subscriptions from 2005 through 2009.

== Virtual economies ==
Within a majority of the MMOs created, there is virtual currency where the player can earn and accumulate money. The uses for such virtual currency are numerous and vary from game to game. The virtual economies created within MMOs often blur the lines between real and virtual worlds. The result is often seen as an unwanted interaction between the real and virtual economies by the players and the provider of the virtual world. This practice (economy interaction) is mostly seen in this genre of games. The two seem to come hand in hand with even the earliest MMOs, such as Ultima Online having this kind of trade: real money for virtual things.

The importance of having a working virtual economy within an MMO is increasing as they develop. A sign of this is CCP Games hiring the first real-life economist for its MMO Eve Online to assist and analyze the virtual economy and production within this game.

The results of this interaction between the virtual economy, and our real economy, which is really the interaction between the company that created the game and the third-party companies that want a share of the profits and success of the game. This battle between companies is defended on both sides. The company originating the game and the intellectual property argue that this is in violation of the terms and agreements of the game as well as copyright violation since they own the rights to how the online currency is distributed and through what channels. The case that the third-party companies and their customers defend, is that they are selling and exchanging the time and effort put into the acquisition of the currency, not the digital information itself. They also express that the nature of many MMOs is that they require time commitments not available to everyone. As a result, without external acquisition of virtual currency, some players are severely limited to being able to experience certain aspects of the game.

The practice of acquiring large volumes of virtual currency for the purpose of selling to other individuals for tangible and real currency is called gold farming. Many players who have poured in all of their personal effort resent that there is this exchange between real and virtual economies since it devalues their own efforts. As a result, the term 'gold farmer' now has a very negative connotation within the games and their communities. This slander has unfortunately also extended itself to racial profiling and to in-game and forum insulting.

The reaction from many of the game companies varies. In games that are substantially less popular and have a small player base, the enforcement of the elimination of 'gold farming' appears less often. Companies in this situation most likely are concerned with their personal sales and subscription revenue over the development of their virtual economy, as they most likely have a higher priority to the games viability via adequate funding. Games with an enormous player base, and consequently much higher sales and subscription income, can take more drastic actions more often and in much larger volumes. This account banning could also serve as an economic gain for these large games, since it is highly likely that, due to demand, these 'gold farming' accounts will be recreated with freshly bought copies of the game.

The virtual goods revenue from online games and social networking exceeded US$7 billion in 2010.

In 2011, it was estimated that up to 100,000 people in China and Vietnam are playing online games to gather gold and other items for sale to Western players. While this 'gold farming' is considered to ruin the game for actual players, many rely on 'gold farming' as their main source of income.

However, single player in MMOs is quite viable, especially in what is called 'player vs environment' gameplay. This may result in the player being unable to experience all content, as many of the most significant and potentially rewarding game experiences are events that require large and coordinated teams to complete.

== Technical aspect ==
Most MMOs also share other characteristics that make them different from other multiplayer online games. MMOs host many players in a single game world, and all of those players can interact with each other at any given time. Popular MMOs might have hundreds of players online at any given time, usually on company-owned servers. Non-MMOs, such as Battlefield 1942 or Half-Life, usually have fewer than 50 players online (per server) and are usually played on private servers. Also, MMOs usually do not have any significant mods, since the game must work on company servers. There is some debate if a high head-count is a requirement to be an MMO. Some say that it is the size of the game world and its capability to support many players that should matter. For example, despite technology and content constraints, most MMOs can fit up to a few thousand players on a single game server at a time.

To support all those players, MMOs need large-scale game worlds, and servers to connect players to those worlds. Some games have all of their servers connected so all players are connected in a shared universe. Others have copies of their starting game world put on different servers, called "shards", for a sharded universe. Shards got their name from Ultima Online, where in the story, the shards of Mondain's gem created the duplicate worlds.

Still, others will only use one part of the universe at any time. For example, Tribes (which is not an MMO) comes with a number of large maps, which are played in rotation (one at a time). In contrast, the similar title PlanetSide allows all map-like areas of the game to be reached via flying, driving, or teleporting.

MMORPGs usually have sharded universes, as they provide the most flexible solution to the server load problem, but not always. For example, the space simulation Eve Online uses only one large cluster server peaking at over 60,000 simultaneous players.

It is challenging to develop the database engines that are needed to run a successful MMO with millions of players. Many developers have created their own, but attempts have been made to create middleware, software that would help game developers concentrate on their games more than technical aspects. One such piece of middleware is called BigWorld.

An early, successful entry into the field was VR-1 Entertainment, whose Conductor platform was adopted and endorsed by a variety of service providers around the world including Sony Communications Network in Japan; the Bertelsmann Game Channel in Germany; British Telecom's Wireplay in England; and DACOM and Samsung SDS in South Korea. Games that were powered by the Conductor platform included Fighter Wing, Air Attack, Fighter Ace, Evernight, Hasbro Em@ail Games (Clue, NASCAR and Soccer), Towers of Fallow, The SARAC Project, VR1 Crossroads and Rumble in the Void.

Typical MUDs and other predecessor games were limited to about 64 or 256 simultaneous player connections; this was a limit imposed by the underlying operating system, which was usually Unix-like. One of the biggest problems with modern engines has been handling the vast number of players. Since a typical server can handle around 10,000–12,000 players, 4000–5000 active simultaneously, dividing the game into several servers has up until now been the solution. This approach has also helped with technical issues, such as lag, that many players experience. Another difficulty, especially relevant to real-time simulation games, is time synchronization across hundreds or thousands of players. Many games rely on time synchronization to drive their physics simulation as well as their scoring and damage detection.

Although there is no specific limit to where an online multiplayer online game is considered massive, there are broad features that are often used as a metric. Garriott's famed 1997 definition referred to the fundamental architecture shift required to support tens of thousands of concurrent players, which required shifting from individual servers to data centers on multiple continents. Games may have MMO features like large worlds with online persistence but still not generally be considered an MMO, such as Grand Theft Auto V's online play, while other games like League of Legends have small individual sessions but the global infrastructure requirements often allow for classification as an MMO. The term is often used differently by players who tend to refer to their play experience versus game developers who refer to the engineering experience. MMO game developers tend to require tremendous investments in developing and maintaining servers around the globe, network bandwidth infrastructure often on the order of terabytes per second, and large engineering problems relating to managing data spread between multiple computer clusters.

== Game types ==
There are several types of massively multiplayer online games.

=== Role-playing ===
Massively multiplayer online role-playing games, known as MMORPGs, are the most common type of MMO. Some MMORPGs are designed as a multiplayer browser game in order to reduce infrastructure costs and utilise a thin client that most users will already have installed. The acronym BBMMORPGs has sometimes been used to describe these as "browser-based".

==== Bulletin board role-playing games ====
Many games are categorized as MMOBBGs,, Massively Multiplayer Online Bulletin Board Games, also called MMOBBRPGs. These particular types of games are primarily made up of text and descriptions, although images are often used to enhance the game.

=== First-person shooter ===
MMOFPS is an online gaming genre which features many simultaneous players in a first-person shooter fashion. These games provide large-scale, sometimes team-based combat. The addition of persistence in the game world means that these games add elements typically found in RPGs, such as experience points. However, MMOFPS games emphasize player skill more than player statistics, as no number of in-game bonuses will compensate for a player's inability to aim and think tactically.

=== Real-time strategy ===
Massively multiplayer online real-time strategy games, also known as "MMORTS", combine real-time strategy (RTS) with a persistent world. Players often assume the role of a general, king, or other types of figurehead leading an army into battle while maintaining the resources needed for such warfare. The titles are often based in a sci-fi or fantasy universe and are distinguished from single or small-scale multiplayer RTSes by the number of players and common use of a persistent world, generally hosted by the game's publisher, which continues to evolve even when the player is offline.

=== Turn-based strategy ===
Steve Jackson Games' UltraCorps is an example of an MMO turn-based strategy game. Hundreds of players share the same playing field of conquest. In a "mega" game, each turn fleets are built and launched to expand one's personal empire. Turns are usually time-based, with a "tick" schedule usually daily. All orders are processed, and battles resolved, at the same time during the tick. Similarly, in Darkwind: War on Wheels, vehicle driving and combat orders are submitted simultaneously by all players and a "tick" occurs typically once per 30 seconds. This allows each player to accurately control multiple vehicles and pedestrians in racing or combat.

=== Simulations ===
Some MMOs have been designed to accurately simulate certain aspects of the real world. They tend to be specific to industries or activities of large risk or huge potential loss, such as rocket science, airplanes, trucks, battle tanks, submarines etc. Gradually simulation technology is becoming more mainstream and various simulators are emerging in wider industries.

The initial goal of World War II Online was to create a map (in northwestern Europe) that had real-world physics (gravity, air/water resistance, etc.), and ability for players to have some strategic abilities to its basic FPS/RPG role. While the current version is not quite a true simulated world, it is very complex and contains a large persistent world.

The MMO genre of air traffic simulation is one example, with networks such as VATSIM and IVAO striving to provide rigorously authentic flight-simulation environments to players in both pilot and air traffic controller roles. In this category of MMOs, the objective is to create duplicates of the real world for people who cannot or do not wish to undertake those experiences in real life. For example, flight simulation via an MMO requires far less expenditure of time and money, is completely risk-free, and is far less restrictive (fewer regulations to adhere to, no medical exams to pass, and so on).

Another specialist application is the mobile telecommunications operator (carrier) business, where network investments can require substantial capital and operators compete on factors including market segmentation and handset subsidies. Nokia developed a business simulation called Equilibrium/Arbitrage in which five teams, each representing the senior management of a different type of telecommunications operator, compete over a two-day period. The simulated market may include an incumbent fixed-line and mobile operator, a new mobile entrant, and a fixed-line or Internet operator, among other types of participants.

Each team is assigned objectives and evaluated according to the market expectations associated with its type of operator. Consequently, the teams may pursue different strategies and objectives, while competing within the same simulated market. The simulation is designed as a competitive exercise in senior-management training and has been used to examine strategic decision-making in the telecommunications sector.

Examples of MMO simulation games include World of Tanks, War Thunder, Motor City Online, The Sims Online, and Jumpgate.

==== Sports ====
A massively multiplayer online sports game is a title where players can compete in some of the more traditional major league sports, such as football (soccer), basketball, baseball, hockey, golf or American football. According to GameSpot, Baseball Mogul Online was "the world's first massively multiplayer online sports game". Other titles that qualify as MMOSG have been around since the early 2000s, but only after 2010 did they start to receive the endorsements of some of the official major league associations and players.

==== Racing ====
MMOR means massively multiplayer online racing. Currently there are only a small number of racing-based MMOs, including iRacing, Kart Rider, Test Drive Unlimited, Project Torque, Drift City and Race or Die. Free browser-based MMORs include Track Wars and Megaproracer. Other notable MMORs included The Crew, Upshift Strikeracer, Motor City Online and Need for Speed: World, all of which have since shut down. The Trackmania series is the world's largest MMO racing game and holds the world record for "Most Players in a Single Online Race". Although Darkwind: War on Wheels is more combat-based than racing, it is also considered an MMOR.

=== Casual ===
Many types of MMO games can be classified as casual, because they are designed to appeal to all computer users (as opposed to subgroup of frequent game buyers), or to fans of another game genre (such as collectible card games). Such games are easy to learn and require a smaller time commitment than other game types. Other popular casual games include simple management games such as The Sims Online or Kung Fu Panda World.

MMOPGs, or massively multiplayer online puzzle games, are based entirely on puzzle elements. They are usually set in a world where the players can access the puzzles around the world. Most games that are MMOPGs are hybrids with other genres. Castle Infinity was the first MMO developed for children. Its gameplay falls somewhere between puzzle and adventure.

There are also massively multiplayer collectible card games: Alteil, Astral Masters and Astral Tournament. Other MMOCCGs might exist (Neopets has some CCG elements) but are not as well known.

Alternate reality games (ARGs) can be massively multiplayer, allowing thousands of players worldwide to co-operate in puzzle trials and mystery solving. ARGs take place in a unique mixture of online and real-world play that usually does not involve a persistent world, and are not necessarily multiplayer, making them different from MMOs.

==== Music/rhythm ====
Massively multiplayer online music/rhythm games (MMORGs), sometimes called massively multiplayer online dance games (MMODGs), are MMOs that are also music video games. This idea was influenced by Dance Dance Revolution. Audition Online is another casual massively multiplayer online game and it is produced by T3 Entertainment.

Just Dance 2014 has a game mode called World Dance Floor, which also structures like an MMORPG.

==== Social ====
Massively multiplayer online social games (MMOSGs) focus on socialization instead of objective-based gameplay. There is a great deal of overlap in terminology with "online communities" and "virtual worlds". One example that has garnered widespread media attention is Linden Lab's Second Life, emphasizing socializing, worldbuilding and an in-world virtual economy that depends on the sale and purchase of user-created content. It is technically an MMOSG or Casual Multiplayer Online (CMO) by definition, though its stated goal was to realize the concept of the Metaverse from Neal Stephenson's novel Snow Crash. Instead of being based around combat, one could say that it was based around the creation of virtual objects, including models and scripts. In practice, it has more in common with Club Caribe than EverQuest. It was the first MMO of its kind to achieve widespread success (including attention from mainstream media); however, it was not the first (as Club Caribe was released in 1988). Competitors in this subgenre (non-combat-based MMORPG) include Active Worlds, There, SmallWorlds, Furcadia, Whirled, IMVU and Red Light Center.

==== Combat ====
Massively multiplayer online combat games are realtime objective, strategy and capture the flag style modes.

Infantry Online is an example multiplayer combat video game with sprite animation graphics, using complex soldier, ground vehicle and space-ship models on typically complex terrains developed by Sony Online Entertainment.

== Research ==
Some recent attempts to build peer-to-peer (P2P) MMOs have been made. Outback Online may be the first commercial one, however, so far most of the efforts have been academic studies. A P2P MMO may potentially be more scalable and cheaper to build, but notable issues with P2P MMOs include security and consistency control, which can be difficult to address given that clients are easily hacked. Some MMOs such as Vindictus use P2P networking and client-server networking together.

In April 2004, the United States Army announced that it was developing a massively multiplayer training simulation called AWE (asymmetric warfare environment). The purpose of AWE is to train soldiers for urban warfare and there are no plans for a public commercial release. Forterra Systems is developing it for the Army based on the There engine.

In 2010, Bonnie Nardi published an ethnographic study on World of Warcraft examined with Lev Vygotsky's activity theory.

As the field of MMOs grows larger each year, research has also begun to investigate the socio-informatic bind the games create for their users. In 2006, researchers Constance A. Steinkuehler and Dmitri Williams initiated research on such topics. The topic most intriguing to the pair was to further understand the gameplay, as well as the virtual world serving as a social meeting place, of popular MMOs.

To further explore the effects of social capital and social relationships on MMOs, Steinkuehler and Williams combined conclusions from two different MMO research projects: sociocultural perspective on culture and cognition, and the other on media effects of MMOs. The conclusions of the two studies explained how MMOs function as a new form of a "third place" for informal social interactions much like coffee shops, pubs, and other typical hangouts. Many scholars, however, such as Oldenburg (1999), challenge the idea of a MMOs serving as a "third place" due to inadequate bridging social capital. His argument is challenged by Putnam (2000) who concluded that MMOs are well suited for the formation of bridging social capital, tentative relationships that lack in depth, because it is inclusive and serves as a sociological lubricant that is shown across the data collected in both of the research studies.

MMOs can also move past the "lubricant" stage and into the "superglue" stage known as bonding social capital, a closer relationship that is characterized by stronger connections and emotional support. The study concludes that MMOs function best as a bridging mechanism rather than a bonding one, similar to a "third place". Therefore, MMOs have the capacity and the ability to serve as a community that effectively socializes users just like a coffee shop or pub, but conveniently in the comfort of their home.

== Spending ==
British online gamers are outspending their German and French counterparts according to a study commissioned by Gamesindustry.com and TNS. The UK MMO-market is now worth £195 million in 2009 compared to the £165 million and £145 million spent by German and French online gamers.

The US gamers spend more, however, spending about $3.8 billion overall on MMO games. $1.8 billion of that money is spent on monthly subscription fees. The money spent averages out to $15.10 between both subscription and free-to-play MMO gamers. The study also found that 46% of 46 million players in the US pay real money to play MMO games.

Today's Gamers MMO Focus Report, published in March 2010, was commissioned by TNS and gamesindustry.com. A similar study for the UK market-only (UK National Gamers Survey Report) was released in February 2010 by the same groups.

== See also ==
- Virtual reality
- Game engine
- List of massively multiplayer online games
- Multiplayer video game
- Online game
- Social network game
- Virtual world
