= Machines at War 3 =

2012 video game

- Logo of the game
- Developer: Isotope 244
- Designer: James Bryant
- Platforms: Windows; Mac OS X
- Release: Windows (v0.9): WW: September 21, 2012; Macintosh (v0.92): WW: November 10, 2012
- Genre: Real-time strategy
- Modes: Single-player, multiplayer

Machines at War 3 is a real-time strategy video game developed by Isotope 244 and published in September 2012 for Windows and on November 10 for Mac OS X. It is a sequel to Land Air Sea Warfare and Machines at War.

== Gameplay ==
The gameplay is inspired by the seminal real-time strategy game Total Annihilation. Players build ground, air and sea factories producing military units across three technology tiers and experimental massive units, as well as varied static defenses and walls to protect their base. Resources include ore, that is obtained at regular intervals from the headquarters as well as mines which must be placed on rare deposits found on the map. The other resource is power, which is a static resource supplied by various power plants and used by buildings and some units.

Where its direct predecessor Land Sea Warfare added naval units, Machines at War 3 adds infantry units, campaign missions and the long anticipated online multiplayer mode to the Machines at War series.

Screenshot showing a typical massive battle featuring "Mega units" and the new infantry units

== External resources ==
- Official website
