= Infinite Dreams (disambiguation) =

"Infinite Dreams" is a live single released in 1989 by the British heavy metal band Iron Maiden.

Infinite Dreams may also refer to:

- Infinite Dreams Inc., a game development studio located in Gliwice, Poland.
- Infinite Dreams Group, an events company based in London, UK.
- Infinite Dreams Technology, an IBM training company.
- Infinite Dreams, a nonprofit dance-related organisation for disabled children founded by Zina Bethune.
