= Handmark =

Developer & distributor of mobile content

Handmark Inc.
- Type: Private
- Industry: Mobile Applications
- Founded: 2000; 26 years ago
- Founder: August Grasis III, Douglas Edwards and Jesse Devitte
- Defunct: 2013; 13 years ago
- Fate: Acquired by Sprint
- Successor: Sprint
- Headquarters: Kansas City, Missouri, United States
- Area served: Global
- Key people: Augie Grasis (Chairman), Paul Reddick (CEO), Terry Carlton (CFO), Evan Conway (EVP Marketing, Support & Ecommerce)
- Products: Pocket Express, TweetCaster, ZAGAT TO GO(SM), Oxford Reference, see full client portfolio: www.handmarkapps.com
- Number of employees: 100
- Website: handmark.com

Handmark Inc. was an American developer and distributor of mobile content, based in Kansas City, Missouri. The company was created in 2000 by the merger of Mobile Generation Software with Palmspring Software.

== History ==
The company's original intention was to sell software and content for the Palm Operating System, and in 2001 handmark purchased the Palm-related MemoWare repository. The company's scope has since expanded to include Windows Mobile, Java, and other mobile computing, smartphone and mobile phone platforms.

The company's Pocket Express wireless service offers users access to news, reference and infotainment content on BlackBerry, Palm Treo, Windows Mobile, and other Wireless handhelds. In addition to the Pocket Express wireless service bundle, Handmark distributes a number of wireless entertainment titles including Warfare Incorporated (RTS) (Palmsource Powered Up award winner).

In January 2008 Handmark and Astraware announced a new business relationship in which Astraware became part of the Handmark group. Astraware was subsequently bought out by its management team in January 2010 and returned to being an independent game developer.

In early 2009, Handmark acquired FreeRange Communications, makers of FreeRange WebReader, a free RSS based feed reader and content service for mobile phones and PDAs. FreeRange Communications was founded by Jon Maroney and located in Portland, Oregon, and the core technology was incorporated in other products including NewsGator Go!, Attensa Mobile and VersionTracker mobile products. Versions were produced for BlackBerry phones, Windows Mobile and Pocket PC, Palm OS devices, Symbian and Java ME phones. The FreeRange reader was folded into Handmark's Pocket Express product line, while FreeRange's content service was branded the Handmark Mobile Publishing Platform. The Mobile Publishing Platform was subsequently spun off as a separate company Freerange 360, which in 2012 was renamed to Storycode.

London-based commuter newspaper The Evening Standard launched a mobile app with Handmark in May 2010.

== Acquisition ==
Handmark was acquired by Sprint on April 4, 2013 and became a subsidiary of Sprint.

== See also ==
- List of mobile software distribution platforms
