= Tapwave Zodiac =

Handheld game console

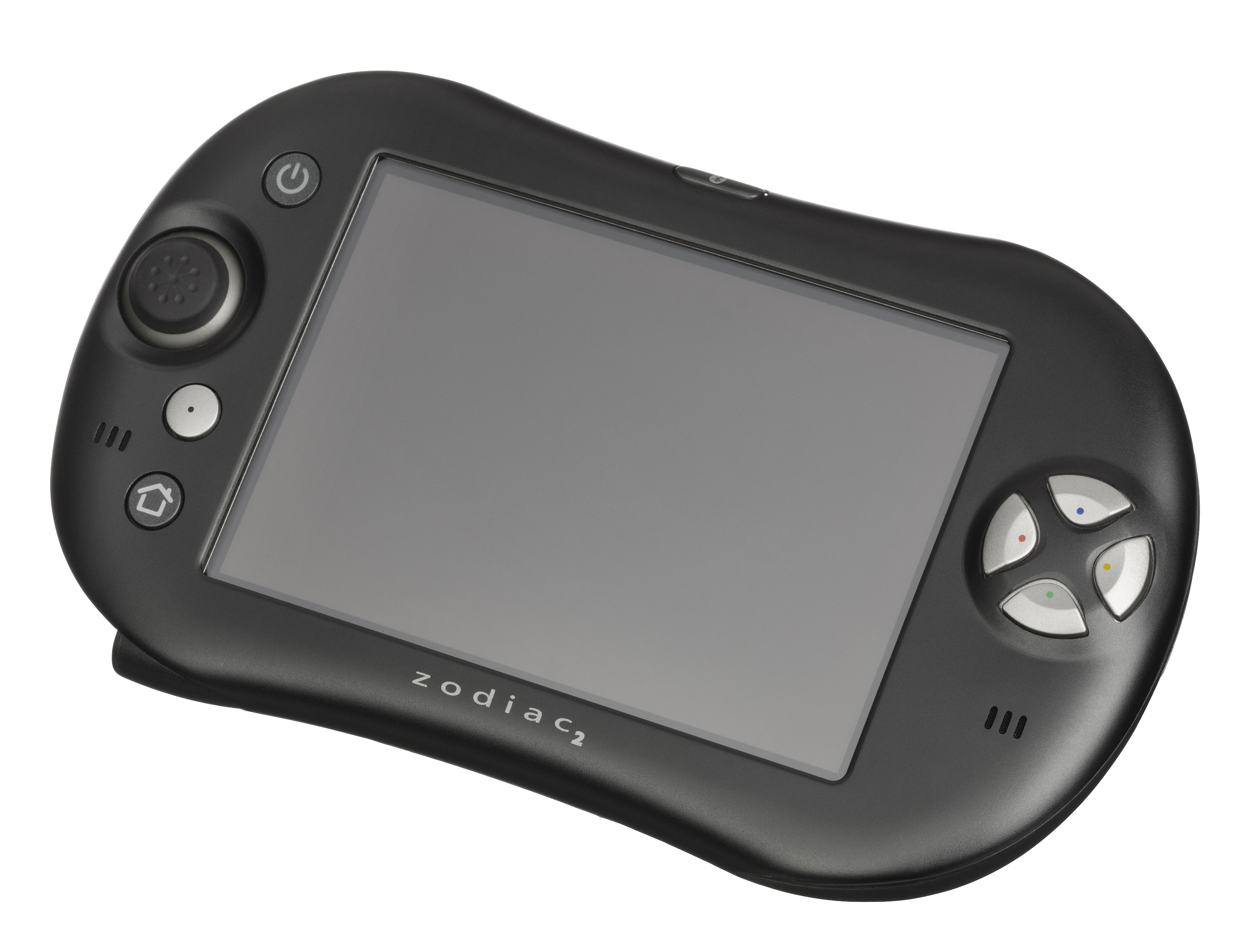
- The Zodiac, in aluminum case
- Manufacturer: Tapwave
- Type: Handheld game console/PDA
- Generation: Sixth
- Released: November 1, 2003
- Lifespan: 2 Years
- Discontinued: July 31, 2005
- Units sold: 50,000+
- Operating system: Palm OS
- CPU: Motorola i.MX-1 ARM9 processor @ 200 MHz
- Memory: 10 MB dedicated to the System Dynamic RAM
- Storage: 32 MB (Zodiac 1); 128 MB (Zodiac 2)
- Graphics: 480x320
- Camera: None
- Touchpad: None
- Connectivity: Wi-Fi, Infrared, Bluetooth, USB 2.0
- Best-selling game: Warfare Incorporated
- Website: www.Tapwave.com

The Tapwave Zodiac is a mobile entertainment console and personal digital assistant. Tapwave announced the system in May 2003 and began shipping in October of that same year. The Zodiac was designed to be a high-performance mobile entertainment system centered on video games, music, photos, and video for 18- to 34-year-old gamers and technology enthusiasts. By running an enhanced version of the Palm Operating System (5.2T), Zodiac also provided access to Palm's personal information management software and many other applications from the Palm developer community. The company was based in Mountain View, California.

The Zodiac console was initially available in two models, Zodiac 1 (32MB) for US$299, and Zodiac 2 (128MB) for US$399. Some of the game titles for the product included Tony Hawk's Pro Skater 4 (Activision); Mototrax (Activision); SpyHunter (Midway); Madden NFL 2005 (EA/MDM); Doom II (id Software); Golden Axe III and Altered Beast (Sega); Warfare Incorporated (Handmark); and Duke Nukem Mobile (3D Realms/MachineWorks).

Due to insufficient funding and strong competitive pressure from the PlayStation Portable (PSP) from Sony (which was pre-announced at E3 on May 16, 2003, and shipped in North America on March 24, 2005), and the DS from Nintendo (released on November 21, 2004), Tapwave sold the company to an undisclosed multibillion-dollar corporation in Asia in July 2005.

The Zodiac console garnered strong product reviews and received many industry awards including Popular Science's Best of What's New Award, Stuff magazine's Top 10 Gadgets of the Year, Wired magazine's Fetish Award, CNET's Editor's Choice Award, PC World's 2004 Next Gear Innovations Award; PC Magazine's 1st Place Last Gadget Standing at CES; Handheld Computing magazine's Most Innovative PDA of 2003; Time magazine Best Gear of 2003; and the Business Week Best Products of 2003.

== History of Tapwave ==
- May 2001: Tapwave was founded by former Palm executives
- May 2002: Tapwave closed initial Series-A funding
- May 2002: Tapwave signed Palm OS licensing agreement with PalmSource
- May 2003: Company was formally launched at Palm Developers Conference & E3
- September 2003: Zodiac entertainment console launched at DEMO conference
- October 2003: Zodiac console began shipping to customers directly from livescribe.com
- November 2003: Tapwave announced that “over 1200 game developers” had signed up for the Tapwave developer program
- February 2004: PalmGear and Tapwave announced partnership to launch an online store to feature the best applications, game titles and ebooks available on the Palm OS platform
- April 2004: Synchronization between Zodiac and Mac OS X desktops enabled by MarkSpace
- June 2004: Zodiac launched into United States retail distribution with CompUSA
- October 2004: Zodiac launched in United Kingdom and sold through PC World, Dixons, and Currys
- October 2004: Zodiac launched in Singapore and distributed by ECS
- November 2004: Zodiac launched in South Korea and co-branded with Sonokong (OEM)
- December 2004: Audible announces audio book support for the Zodiac
- December 2004: Tapwave announces Wi-Fi SD card for the Zodiac with “enhanced mail application and web browser”
- January 2005: Tapwave and Virgin Digital announced strategic alliance for audio download and subscription services
- July 2005: Tapwave discontinued the sale of the Zodiac mobile entertainment console and sold substantially all of its assets to an undisclosed multibillion-dollar corporation in Asia and wound down operations

== Primary features ==
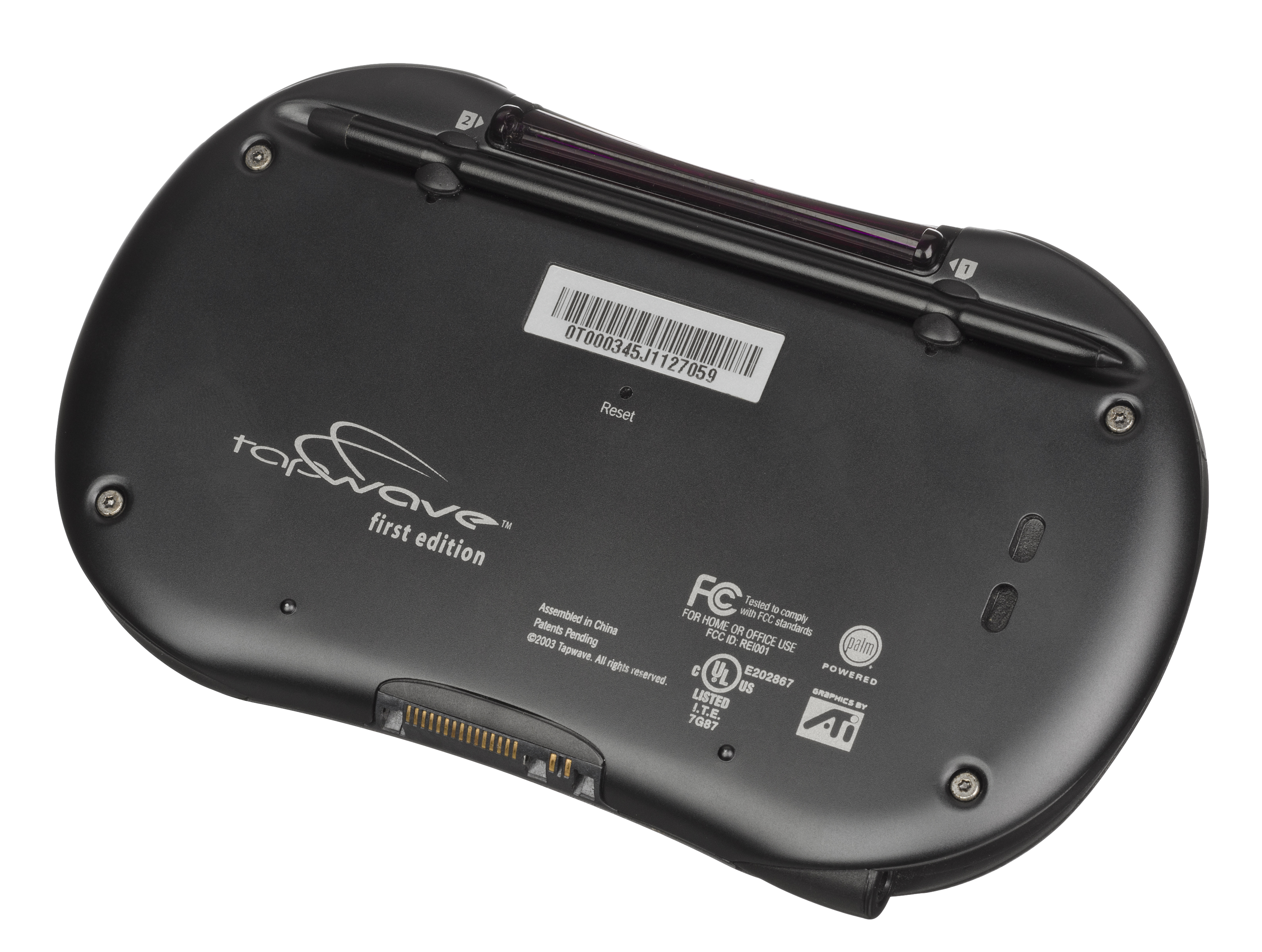
The back of the Zodiac

=== Music, images, and video ===
An MP3 music player is included in the system's applications, and allows the creation of custom playlists using drag-and-dropping of files. MP3 music files can be played from either SD slot, or the internal memory of the device. MP3 files can also be used as alarms, along with conventional Palm OS alarms.

Photos (JPEG or PNG format) could be downloaded to the device using the Palm Desktop software or loaded onto SD cards, and could be shared and made into a slideshow (with background music) on the device.

The bundled video player on the device, Kinoma, would only play videos in a proprietary format, converted using the Kinoma Producer software (which supported conversion of MPEG1, MPEG4, QuickTime, AVI and DivX). The software however was limited in its conversion abilities, enticing users to pay for the full version. It has been suggested that this difficulty in converting video for the device diminished the Zodiac's success. Several aftermarket DivX and XviD players have been developed (such as the TCPMP), and, at the time of bankruptcy, Tapwave were working on an update to supply MPEG-4 hardware decoding.

=== Device design ===
Due to the metal construction of the Zodiac, the device was seen to be more solid than other PDAs. However, on some models the adhesive on the shoulder buttons failed, and occasionally the screen was scratched by the screen cover when grit entered. Furthermore, due to the insecure clip holding the stylus, they could be knocked loose and potentially lost. Some alternative cases solved this problem with their own stylus holder.

=== Compatibility ===
The Zodiac is a Palm OS 5-compatible device, and most software compatible with Palm OS 5 runs without issue. In particular, most Palm OS 5-compatible games play on the Zodiac. Tapwave also provided proprietary APIs to allow developers to take advantage of the Zodiac's graphics and sound hardware. A great deal of freeware and shareware games and emulators are therefore available. For example, there are versions of Doom, Quake, Hexen, Hexen II, and Heretic as well as versions of emulators such as UAE, ScummVM, and LJZ/LJP, a multi-system emulator. There have also been attempts to emulate PlayStation games onto the Zodiac, the most successful emulator being PPSX. It is, however, nowhere near completion and many games are not playable yet.

=== Battery ===
The device has a total battery life of about 3 hours when using video, backlight+screen and CPU-intensive tasks, and while running as a dedicated audio player it is closer to 6 hours. The original battery was a 1500mAh Li-Ion; third party replacements with 2000mAh capacity are still available from some manufacturers.

=== Software ===
The Zodiac used a modified version of the Palm OS, designated version 5.2T. The main navigation menus consisted of 8 radially-arranged choices selected using either the touchscreen or thumbstick. It also came with the Palm OS Productivity Suite (containing a calendar, to do list etc.), an eBook reader, the Wordsmith word processor and the powerOne graphing application. It came bundled with two games, AcidSolitare (by Red Mercury) and Stunt Car Extreme (by Vasara Games).

=== Models ===
The Zodiac console was initially available in two models, Zodiac 1 (32MB), and Zodiac 2 (128MB). The Zodiac 2 was $100 more expensive than the original Zodiac.

== Games ==
Games which utilized some or all of the Zodiac's hardware/software are incompatible with standard Palm OS devices. This does exclude platforms outside of Palm OS (e.g., Doom II is also out for PC, but the Zodiac version listed here won't run on standard Palm OS handhelds). This list also excludes standard Palm OS games which are also available for Zodiac handhelds, which were either identical or slightly improved on Zodiac, called "Zodiac tuned" (e.g. a game available for standard Palm OS only has the extra features of vibration and shoulder buttons as extra usable buttons when played on Zodiac).

Some of the games were never released due to the discontinuation of the Zodiac in July 2005. However, the testing builds of some of these games were leaked and are playable.

=== Zodiac exclusive titles ===
- Acedior
- Altered Beast
- Animated Dudes
- Anotherball
- Atari Retro
- Avalanche
- Bike or Die
- Billiards
- Bubble Shooter 2
- Colony
- Crossword Puzzles
- Daedalus 3D – The Labyrinth
- Dreamway
- Firefly: Pacman clone
- FireHammer
- Fish Tycoon
- Frutakia
- Galactic Realms
- Gloop Zero by AeonFlame: (was shareware, but is now freeware) puzzle game where players direct the flow of liquid slime material to its goal by drawing platform lines and using other tools.
- Golden Axe
- Interstellar Flames
- Jet Ducks
- Kickoo's Breakout
- Legacy
- MegaBowling
- MicroQuad
- Orbz (was shareware, but is now freeware as of September 2006)
- Paintball
- Pocket Mini Golf
- Pocket Mini Golf eXtra
- RifleSLUGS-W: Wild Web Wars
- Stunt Car Extreme: 3D, 1st-person or 3rd-person racing game. Comes with the Zodiac CD.
- Table Tennis 3D
- The Green Myste
- Tots ‘n’ Togs
- Xploids
- ZapEm

Zodiac exclusive titles, also available on SD card

- Doom II
- Duke Nukem Mobile
- GTS Racing Challenge
- SpyHunter
- Tiger Team: Apache vs Hind
- Tony Hawk's Pro Skater 4
- Z Pak: Adventure
- Z Pak: Fun

"Zodiac tuned" titles

- Madden NFL 2005 (CD-ROM; uploaded from PC)
- Warfare Incorporated

Unreleased but leaked games

- Street Hoops, tech demo
- MTX: Mototrax, complete
- Hockey Rage 2004, complete, but crash on exit
- Neverwinter Nights, tech demo
- Terminator 3: Complete game, few sound elements missing.
- Tomb Raider, complete original first and second game

=== Ports ===
Several homebrew (freeware) games were released on ports.

- ZDoomZ, a ZDoom port to Palm/Zodiac
- ZHeretic, a Heretic port to Palm/Zodiac
- ZHexen, a Hexen port to Palm/Zodiac
- ZHexen2, Hexen II port to Palm/Zodiac
- Little John Palm (LJP), a multisystem emulator for Palm/Zodiac
- LJZ, the old version of LJP, discontinued.
- pPSX, Emulates psx games at limited speed without sound. Low compatibility. Incomplete.
- ReverZi, an Othello/Reversi clone for Zodiac
- ZodMAME, a MAME port to the Zodiac
- ZodNEO, a NeoGeo port to the Zodiac
- ZodSCUMM, ScummVM port to the Zodiac
- ZSpectrum, a ZX Spectrum port to the Zodiac
- REminiscence, a Zodiac port of Flashback
- Thruster, a fast-paced cave flyer.
- Noiz2sa
- Orbital Sniper, Look down from high above and shoot hostiles in a city grid layout while protecting innocent lives. (Freeware)
- Zodtris, Zodiac only version of Tetris. (Freeware)
- Zap 'Em, a close conversion of Zoop for PC (Freeware)
- ZoT
- Zyrian
- Another World
- ZodTTD, an OpenTTD port to the Zodiac
- TCPMP, a media player that could play back many codecs that the Zodiac did not originally support

== Hardware specifications ==
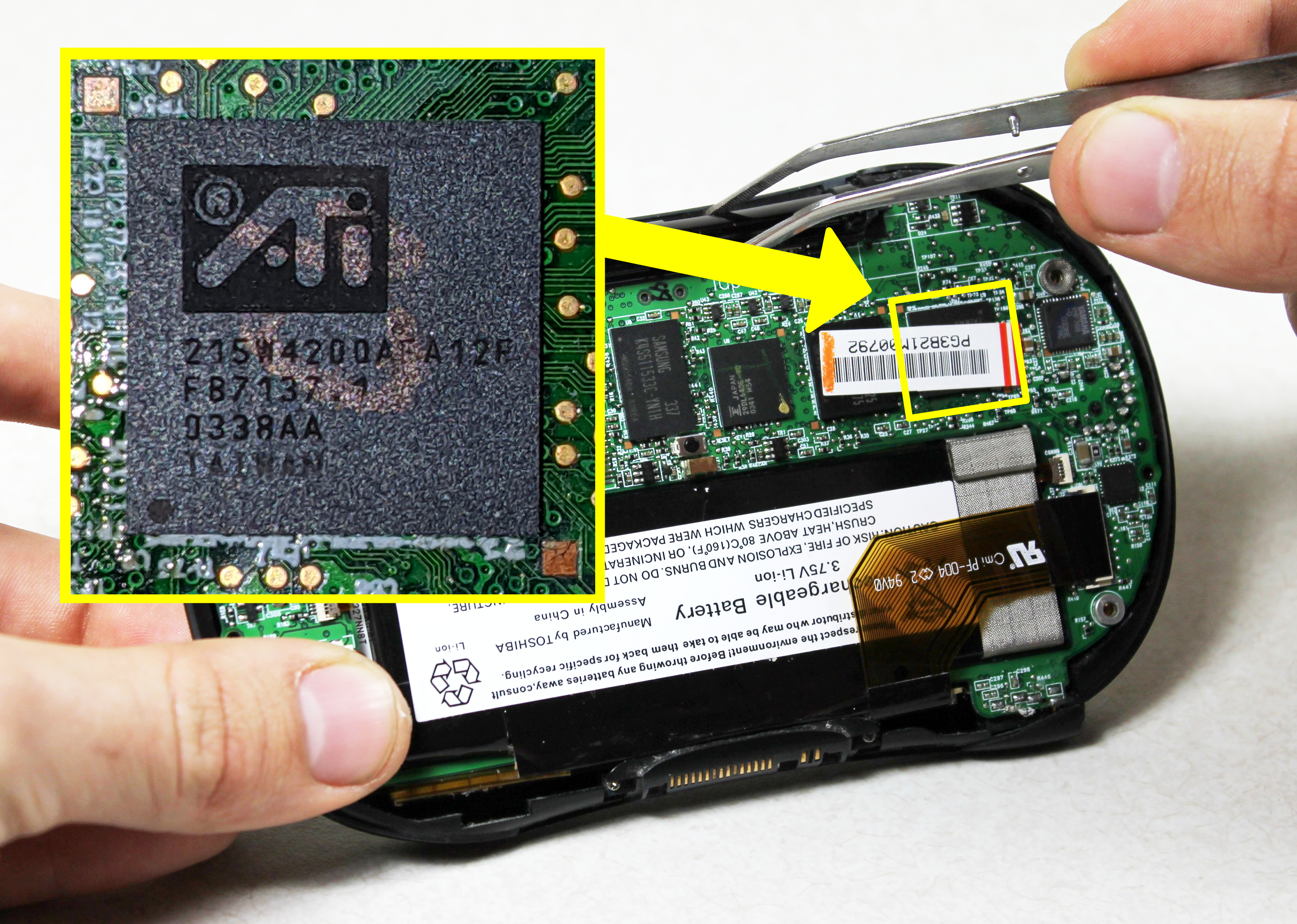
Device teardown, highlighting the ATI W4200 chip

Two versions of the Zodiac are available, differing only in the amount of memory and case colour.

- CPU: Motorola i.MX1 ARM9 processor (200 MHz)
- Memory: Zodiac 1 had 32 MB. Zodiac 2 had 128 MB. Both have 10 MB Dedicated to the System Dynamic RAM
- Graphic Accelerator: ATI Imageon W4200 2D graphics accelerator (with 8 MB dedicated SDRAM)
- Controls: Analog controller (or joystick) with 360 degrees of motion, built-in triggers and action button array similar to other gaming consoles.
- Display: 3.8 inch transflective 480×320 (half VGA), 16-bit colour backlit display (65,536 colours)
- Sound: Yamaha sound and stereo speakers, 3.5 mm earphone plug
- External Connectors: 2 expansion slots (both are MMC / SD capable, one is also SDIO capable), Zodiac Connector, 3.5 mm headphone jack
- Wireless: Infrared, Bluetooth (Compatible with some Wifi SDIO cards depending on drivers)
- Battery: Rechargeable Lithium Batteries – Dual totaling to 1540 mA·h
- Size and Weight: 5.6 in × 3.1 in × 0.55 in (142 mm × 79 mm × 14 mm), 6.3 oz (180 g)
  - Compare to the Palm TX which is smaller at 78×15×121 mm due to fewer buttons, but includes WiFi
- Colors: Zodiac 1: Slate Gray, Zodiac 2: Charcoal Gray
- Casing: Synthetic rubber, anodized aluminum, plastic

== Peripherals and accessories ==
- 5V regulated DC switch mode battery charger, using proprietary connector
- USB PC synchronization cable, incorporating pass-through female charger connector (allowing charging from mains while synchronizing)
- Car battery charger
- Cradle attachment for sync cable (poorly designed, unreliable electrical contacts)
- Folding Keyboard (some 3rd party Bluetooth & IR models, unknown whether dedicated keyboard capable of using sync cable connector existed)
- Some SDIO cameras could be used, such as the Veo Camera

== See also ==
- Handheld game console
