= Atomic Cannon =

2005 video game

- Logo
- Developer(s): Isotope 244
- Designer(s): James Bryant
- Platform(s): Windows, Mac OS X, Windows Mobile
- Release: 2003; 22 years ago
- Genre(s): Artillery
- Mode(s): Single-player, multiplayer

Atomic Cannon is an artillery video game similar to the Atari 2600 game Artillery Duel. It was developed by Isotope244 and released in 2003. The gameplay is based on the seminal 1976 artillery game Artillery by Mike Forman.

== Reception ==
- Smartphone Magazine selected Atomic Cannon Pocket as winner in the category "Shooting Games" of the "Best Software Awards 2005", stating that the game "is a strategic artillery simulation with realistic graphics and effects. Use over 85 different weapons. Create scorched earth in this strategic tank simulation where you battle against a computer or your friends on 25 deformable landscapes. The game features numerous user options, a full music track, and superior effects."
- Brighthand stated that "Atomic Cannons is, effectively, infinitely replayable. It's also exceptionally customizible, and simply fun to boot." and mentioned the Pros "Quality graphics, Exceptional gameplay, Immensely challenging".
