= Battle command knowledge system =

Military change agent

BCKS logo

The Battle Command Knowledge System (BCKS) is the change agent for implementing knowledge management (KM) capabilities into the training and military operations of the United States Army. BCKS is headquartered at the U.S. Army Combined Arms Center at Fort Leavenworth, Kansas.

== History ==
Army Professional Forums were informally implemented by volunteers who wanted to share their knowledge and experience with their peers in order to improve their profession. CompanyCommand.com and Platoon Leader were formally adopted by the U.S. Army in 2002. The Battle Command Knowledge System Professional Forums were formed in September 2004 to provide structure to this knowledge sharing process. Later, the NCOTeam.org was also supported and adopted by BCKS.

By September 2004, there were four formal U.S. Army Professional Forums with approximately 20,000 members. Since that time, the U.S. Army has grown their Professional Forums into one of the premier collaboration instruments in the U.S. Government with 46 Professional Forums supporting active and reserve forces as well as the National Guard. The Professional Forums support soldiers around the world, 24 hours a day, 365 days a year. These collaboration tools have been widely accepted across the entire enterprise structure, with membership ranging from General Officer to Private, all being able to share their unique knowledge and experience with others on the Professional Forum without regard to rank or position. Army Professional Forums currently have over 130,000 members and are growing at a rate of approximately 1,900 new members per month mainly by word of mouth through a grassroots effort.

== KM forums ==
BCKS provides a social network of facilitated professional forums that provide a foundation for knowledge transfer. Army soldiers and civilians connect to share explicit and tacit knowledge to solve problems, share best practices, and develop their professional skills. Leaders and staff members have access to others with similar duty positions and challenges. Functional specialists and those interested in a particular specialized domain gather virtually in focused forums.

== Statistics ==
- More than 50 BCKS forums with approximately 162,000 accounts
- 4 West Point forums with 17,000 accounts
- BCKS Growth = 3,000 per month
- West Point Growth = 400 per month
- Total Growth = 3,400 per month
- 83,000 unique visitors per month
- 2,800 unique visitors per day

=== NCO site history ===
NCO Net origins began in the early 1990s with Command Sergeant Major Daniel K. Elder exploring his personal computer and modem with friends. They were dabbling with PCs and the new telecommunication capability – bulletin board systems (BBS's). With a dial up modem hosted in his house and a single phone line, NCOs could log onto "The Old Soldiers BBS" with a local Ft. Knox KY number. In the earliest days, only one person at a time could connect to the BBS – an era before the internet, before Google, and before military documents were easily accessed. It was also a time where long distance costs were charged. But once dialed in, the NCO would find relevant files and time saver programs for soldiers, many of them provided by the Command and Control Microcomputer Users Group (C2MUG) at Ft Leavenworth, Kansas. Users could also log on daily to read and respond to postings in the threaded discussions. The NCO site was the manual Yahoo search engine for Army NCOs.

By 1997 the BBS went away. CSM Elder continued to explore technology and began building the first NCO website on GeoCities. Here the focus began to expand with how the internet could help soldiers in their day to day productivity. His buddies gave feedback on what would be beneficial. The site began to host soldier related programs. NCOs would go to the site to share Standard Operation Procedure (SOP) or Tactics, Techniques, and Procedures (TTPs). But a percentage of them stayed and interactively participated in the discussions. These highly motivated and interested NCOs became the Peer Mentors who helped other NCOs. The Peer Mentors seldom met in person. The Peer Mentors became a family, they argued, laughed and most of all learned from each other. They would physically call other NCOs to help them solve their problems. The Peer Mentors were all volunteers who just wanted to make things better for the other NCOs. Later the site moved which required the purchase of an URL and software registrations. CSM Elder purchased this software out of his pocket. Anything that would help NCOs of today to stay relevant was provided by CSM Elder and his "merry band" of misfits.

CSM Elder emphasized that there was a gap in knowledge among the enlisted ranks. He created the NCO site to fill this void. The NCO site provided tools and discussions on how to use them, how to find what they needed, and how to digest it all. It was all about what to do and how to do your job. As friends told friends, the site became popular. At one point, the NCO site was used by many NCOs in the Army. Dedicated and passionate volunteers gave their personal time and resources to develop, grow, and make the NCO site relevant. Each NCO had a full-time day job. It was a team effort with many unsung heroes. On August 28, 2003, Cmd Sgt Maj. Dan Elder was awarded the first-ever AKM Pioneer Award by the US Army Chief Information Officer.

In October 2005 the NCO site migrated at the US Army Sergeants Major Academy into the Battle Command Knowledge System. Today the NCO Net is a composite of all its very successful predecessors. NCO Net has evolved into a global system of professional forums, knowledge centers, and supporting toolkits for sharing information and experiences, problems solving, improving operational performance and support of the Non-Commissioned Officers Education System (NCOES). Most of the original Peer Mentors continue to volunteer and make NCO Net work.

In addition to platform and leadership changes, NCO Net has two professional forum facilitators who coordinated the transition of the NCO Team site into the NCO Net, brought the volunteer NCO Team Facilitators (formally known as the Peer Mentors) on board, integrated the NCO Net into the U.S. Army Sergeant Major Academy (USASMA) courses, and consistently espoused the benefits of NCO Net to the Senior NCO Leadership of the Army. Given the inheritance of the NCO team and the leadership, persistence and hard work, NCO Net continues to provide a collaborative capability allowing NCOs from across the Army to rapidly get answers to questions and provide peer to peer discussions of important issues to the Army and the NCO Corps.

== Results ==
NCO Net posted a 3D animated video clip "Trouble at Checkpoint 4" showing a set of problems unfolding at a checkpoint in Iraq. The online NCO facilitator led discussion with context specific thought questions on how the soldiers could handle the situation. Over 220 comments from junior to senior ranks were posted within first 48 hours.

== See also ==
- LOGNet
