= Sky Force =

Sky Force video game series
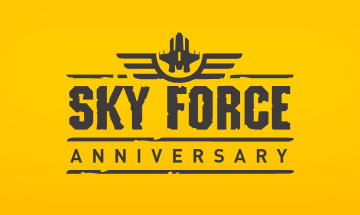
- Sky Force Anniversary game logo
- Developer: Infinite Dreams Inc.
- Publisher: Infinite Dreams Inc.
- Director: Tomasz Kostrzewski
- Designers: Tomasz Skora; Grzegorz Mitas
- Programmers: Marcin Pancewicz; Marek Wyszynski; Ali Benbayound; Michal Momot; Seweryn Panczyniak; Piotr Zurek
- Artists: Krzysztof Kakuszka; Grzegorz Mitas; Piatr Tondos; Piatr Zurek; Lukasz Leszczuk; Maciej Birkenmayer; Andrzej Wysocki
- Composers: Jack Dojwa; Adam Skorupa; Przemek Zelias-Hoang
- Series: Sky Force
- Platforms: Symbian, Pocket PC, Palm webOS, Windows, MacOS, Android TV, Apple TV (device), iOS, Android, PlayStation Portable, PlayStation 3, PlayStation 4, PlayStation Vita, Xbox One, Wii U, Nintendo Switch, Tesla
- Release: EU: 2004
- Genres: Shoot-em-up, vertically scrolling shooter

Sky Force is a vertically scrolling shoot 'em up video game series created by the Polish video game developer Infinite Dreams Inc. The gameplay is reminiscent of Capcom's 19XX series and Seibu Kaihatsu's Raiden series, featuring a weapon upgrade system and large end of stage bosses.

The original Sky Force and Sky Force 2014 has the player fighting the evil General Mantis, who seeks to rain havoc upon the world in his Night Owl. The player must defeat his various ships, planes, helicopters and tanks, with his final battle failing as his Night Owl gets destroyed and falls down to the ground. In Sky Force 2014, after you defeat General Mantis is another stage where you face an AI controlled robot called Omega in his mech. But even after destroying his mech he survives.

The sequel Sky Force Reloaded has the player fighting the defeated General's daughter Scarlett Mantis. She wants revenge for the destruction of her father. She also has a pool of vehicles, such as more helicopters, planes and tanks, a lot of which have a resemblance to her father's. But in the end, she dies in her tank "The Scarlet Tank". There is also another stage where you face Omega again with his flying "[OMEGA]". And just before it crashes down to the ground, it suddenly flies up to the sky with him surviving yet again.

In all of the levels, the player destroys and shoots many planes, helicopters, tanks, AA, laser turrets and more while rescuing civilians on the ground.

== Sky Force (2004) ==
The first title in the series was originally released for Symbian and Pocket PC in 2004 and was ported to Palm webOS in 2005, iOS in 2009, and Android in 2010. The mobile versions of the game were removed later on. The first game in the series used 2D sprite graphics with some 3D polygon objects, like hills and destructible watchtowers. In levels, if you destroyed enemies, you could sometimes get one of 2 power ups;

1. Laser, which makes your plane fire a large plasma at enemies.
2. Energy Shield, which temporarily protected you from any harm, including enemies, bullets, and explosions.

=== Reception ===
The game received a near-perfect rating by IGN who gave it a score of 9.5 out of 10.

== Sky Force Reloaded (2006) ==
The second outing was initially released for Symbian, Pocket PC and Palm webOS in 2006 and was later released for iOS in 2009, Android in 2010, which were also removed and PSP in 2011. The PSP version of "Sky Force Reloaded" was simply named "Sky Force". The 2D sprite graphics style of the first title was also used with 3D polygon objects. It also had the same power up system.

=== Reception ===
The PSP version of the game received a Metacritic score of 69 out of 100, based on 6 reviews.

== Sky Force 2014 ==
For the 10 year anniversary of the original Sky Force, the third part in the series was released on June 4, 2014, acting as a remake, since the original soundtrack was remixed, retaining core systems of the original game and keeping parts of the original Sky Force levels for both iOS and Android as a free-to-play game. In the third part of the series, the 2D graphics of the first two titles were entirely replaced with better polygonal 3D graphics. It featured 9 different levels which got harder, and had a new upgrade system where you collected stars in levels by destroying enemies and bosses, but upgrading needed real world time to upgrade which could be skipped with the stars. It also retained the same power up system, and another new power up in the game was added which is the Megabomb. When activated, it deploys a bomb destroying enemies on the whole screen, and all 3 could be upgraded. The rest of the next games also feature this system. It also featured a new friends system, where you could rescue them in the place they died for a star reward. You could have friends by using an ID, or by connecting to Facebook. There is one bonus level in the game that is not included in the console and PC version of the game.

=== Reception ===
The iOS version of the game received a favorable Metacritic score of 83 out of 100, based on 8 reviews. Some Google Play reviews complained about the large amount of currency needed to buy better upgrades for the ship.

== Sky Force Anniversary ==
This title is the PC, console and TV version of Sky Force 2014. It was available on Windows via Steam (service) in 2015, Android TV and Apple TV (device) in early 2016, Xbox One, PlayStation 3, PlayStation 4, PlayStation Vita via PlayStation Network on April 27, 2016, the Wii U via the Nintendo eShop in late 2016, and finally the Nintendo Switch in 2017. If you had a second controller, you could have another plane with you which is controlled by a friend. This version is paid and has an improved upgrade system, removing wait times for upgrades and decreasing costs.

=== Reception ===
The game received a favorable review by Hardcore Gamer who gave it a score of 4 out of 5.

== Sky Force Reloaded (2016) ==
For the 10-year anniversary of the original Sky Force Reloaded, the fourth part in the series was released on June 1, 2016, as another remake for both iOS and Android as a free-to-play game. It used the same polygonal 3D graphics, and some were of reduced quality. It used the same core systems as the last 2 installments but with 3 bonus stages and 13 levels, and you could find new ships. It was also released on Windows via Steam (service), MacOS, Xbox One, PlayStation 4, and Nintendo Switch in 2018 as a paid game, removing upgrade wait times and reducing costs, like the console version from the last game, and on Tesla, Inc. car touchscreens in 2021, using the exact same code from the console and PC version with additional features like connecting controllers and using the touchscreen to navigate.

=== Reception ===
The Nintendo Switch port of the game received a Metacritic score of 74 out of 100, based on 16 reviews.
