= Land Air Sea Warfare =

2010 video game

- Logo of the game
- Developer: Isotope 244
- Publisher: Isotope 244/iTunes (iOS)
- Director: James Bryant
- Producer: James Bryant
- Designer: James Bryant
- Programmer: James Bryant
- Artist: James Bryant
- Platforms: Microsoft Windows; Mac OS X Android iPhone/iPod Touch/iPad; Windows Mobile; Ouya
- Release: Windows v0.9 Beta: WW: January 15, 2010; Windows v1.0: WW: January 31, 2010; Mac v1.0: WW: February 19, 2010; iPad v1.0: WW: September 10, 2010
- Genre: Real-time strategy
- Mode: Single-player

Land Air Sea Warfare (abbreviated as LASW) is a real-time strategy game developed by Isotope 244. It is the sequel to Machines at War and the predecessor of Machines at War 3. LASW was released in 2010 for Microsoft Windows, Android, Mac OS X, iOS (iPhone/iPod Touch/iPad) and Windows Mobile. It features gameplay similar to other RTS titles like Command & Conquer: Red Alert, Age of Empires, StarCraft, Warcraft, and Supreme Commander. The game was ported to Ouya in 2015.

== Gameplay ==
While the gameplay is reminiscent of the seminal Command & Conquer series, it does not feature soldier units. The game revolves around establishing a base and fortifying it against attacks from other factions, who are played by the computer, as well as executing invasions of the enemy bases. To build a base and open production of military units, constant mining of ore and production of energy are crucial. There are three kinds of offense unit types (ground, air and sea units) as well as defensive units to protect the base. Both are produced in specialized factories and can be deployed in groups. New technologies can be researched and in total, the tech tree contains over 100 structures and units to choose from. Among these are stealth aircraft and submarines for reconnaissance missions, aircraft to bombard enemy bases and helicopters for unit transports. In a game, literally thousands of units can be commanded simultaneously, resulting in epic battles. Specific tactics can be applied: land units can be hidden under trees for ambush attacks and tread marks left by enemy tanks can be scouted to their base. Unique mineral ores permit building of giant "Mega units" for more effective attacks. Each game is concluded by detailed statistics and graphs. The game expands Machines at War by sea units.

=== Climate types ===
The climate of the region affects only the visual appearance of the map. It determines number and distribution of trees, water, ground, etc. on the map. There are four different climatic settings: Grassland, Volcanic, Tundra and Desert.

=== Landscape types ===
The game uses a random map system with several types of terrain. The landscape type of the game map determines which bases and units can be built, which strategies may be applied and which kinds of mineral ore resource may be found, in turn determining which Mega units may be built later in the game. Ground-based landscapes do not have the unique resources for naval Mega units, and water based landscapes do not have the resources for land Mega units.

There are eleven different landscape map types: Mainland, Oceanic(the whole map is water, although air units can still be built), Islands (each player starts on an island), Oasis, Choke Point (swamps in the center), Center Point (all resources in the middle), Outlands (resources in the corners), Islets(many small islands), Swamp, Continental (large landmasses with rivers) and Fortress (a central island with all resources). In total, there are six different kinds of resources: Xephal, Crom, Isonium, Betniah, Rhoxia and Nuba.

=== Victory Conditions ===
The game can be customized with different conditions of victory:

- Normal - deathmatch until only one player or team remains, or all other players have surrendered.
- Assassination - the player loses if his leader (on a heavily armored fast transport hovercraft) dies.
- Arms Race - first player to launch a Jericho V ICBM wins.
- Team Traitors - when playing teams and after one team wins, team members must defeat each other.
- All Your Base - the player loses if the Headquarters are destroyed.
- The Mega Project - the first to complete building a mega unit wins.
- Scientist's Domain - the first to complete researching Tech 3 wins.

== Units, buildings and technologies ==
This section gives an overview of available unit types and their properties.

=== Engineering ===
Most of these structures are destined for energy production, some are fortification structures and others for harvesting and storing ore.

=== Buildings ===
The majority of these buildings are specialized military unit production facilities, others upgrade technologies, create protective shields or enhance/jam viewing range.

=== Offensive units ===
==== Land units ====
The six different land units are produced in the Land Factory production facility. These include two anti-air trucks (Humvee and Ram), a light tank (Challenger), a multi-role truck (Cougar), a mobile long range artillery (Archer) and a flamethrower armed truck (Viper).

==== Amphibious units ====
The three different amphibious units can be produced in both the Land Factory and the Sea Factory and travel on land and sea. They include two attack hovercraft (Samum and Spawn) as well as a repair hovercraft (Newt).

==== Air units ====
The eight types of air units are produced in the Air Factory production facility. There are a fast recon fighter (Wasp), attack and transport helicopters (Apache and Crane), two attack fighters (Raptor and Osprey), two types of bombers (Valkyrie and Lancer) and a stealth fighter (Black Widow). As other offensive units, the air units vary in speed, attack strength and their capacity to attack Land, Air and Sea units.

==== Sea units ====
There are in total seven different sea units which are produced in the Sea Factory production facility: an anti-air destroyer (Stingray), two assault boats (Lupis and Zumwalt), as well as four different submarines (Seawolf, Megalodon, Eel - with electric shock capabilities, and Abyss).

==== Technologies ====
New Technologies can be researched in three distinct research facilities:

- Looking Glass - 10 different upgrades of Sea units
- Orchid - 11 different upgrades of Land units
- Tempest - 9 different upgrades of Air units

=== Defensive units ===
Defense units serve to defend the base. There are units against Land (defensive cannon M779, large long range artillery Bertha, land mine IMS), Air (floating missile launcher GAAM, turret AP250, floating turret Phalanx, anti-air S.A.M. launcher M300, floating flame launcher Kallini), Sea and Sub units (torpedo launcher Mavic, sea mine Zork). There are also two large defense installations (on land Merlon and in the sea Zenith) and an anti-I.C.B.M. Laser defense (Illuminati). Some of these weapons require advanced levels in the tech tree.

=== Mega Units ===
The "Mega units" are gigantic weapons that allow for very effective attacks, but they cost more than normal units, take more time to build, require development of the tech tree up to level 3 and specific unique mineral ores to be harvested in special mines.

- Rapture - massive submarine which fires a huge Mark V Torpedo.
- Dreadnought - massive destroyer with two long range double barrel cannons.
- Goliath - massive tank featuring quad medium range cannons.
- Titanis - massive gunship that rains down eight air to surface rockets per volley.
- Rapier - massive air superiority fighter with six high speed guns.
- Magna Laser - massive laser gun that damages any unit crossing its ray.
- Missile Pad - build and launch ICBMs to attack units anywhere.
  - Jericho V - ICBMs can destroy a huge area anywhere.
  - Poseidon - ICBM equipped with a detonator that creates an EMP which disables all surface units for 30 seconds.

== Technics ==
In-game graphics are based on raster graphics (i.e., pixels). The game engine renders fog and water as strips instead of tiles which increases its rendering performance.

== Reception ==
Reception

Review scores
Publication	Score
Pocket Gamer	3.5/5
TouchArcade	4/5

The game has received positive reviews.
