= Samurai Romanesque =

2001 video game

Samurai Romanesque is the first commercial mobile massive multiplaying game, allowing the player to play as a Samurai in the Sengoku era. Players could go online and battle in a match of up to 50 players in a war between nations. A server is capable of holding thousands of players at any given time.

== Gameplay ==
Players start the game training offline to perform tasks to improve performance and to prepare online. When the player enters online, they may explore towns, talk, trade, and fight NPCs and other players.

The players may also find the opposite sex in the game to marry and give birth to a child, which inherits the players stats. A character can live to 40 years old, as the character passes away, the players can take control of their child with their inherited stats.

Another feature in the game is its incorporation of real time weather. Dwango has worked together with the Japanese Weather Association to use the weather data in Japan to affect the games weather. The weather would also affect some part of the character. For example, if it rained, the players wouldn't be able to use firearms as gunpowder would get wet or have difficulty traveling to places quicker, as the roads would get muddy.
