= Isotope 244 =

American video game company

- Company type: Private
- Industry: Video games
- Founded: 1999
- Key people: James Bryant (founder)
- Products: Acky's XP Breakout; Atomic Cannon; Atomic Battle Dragons; Machines at War; Land Air Sea Warfare; Machines at War 3
- Website: www.isotope244.com

Isotope 244 is a video game developer, based in the US. It was founded by James Bryant in 1999. Isotope 244 is best known for developing retro remakes and real-time strategy genres for both desktop and mobile devices. Isotope 244 was also a leading developer of 3D screensavers in the early 2000s. The company received several mentions for its retrogaming and real-time strategy games, above all on portable platforms. James also goes by the username "Rasterman" on stack exchange and moddb.

== History ==
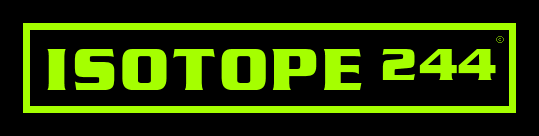
New logo of Isotope 244

Atomic Cannon Pocket is a turn-based strategy game for the Pocket PC. It was the top selling game on Handango for several months and won several awards including PocketGear's Editors Choice, Handango Champion Award, Best PDA Ground Game, and winner of the Pocket PC Magazine 2005 Best Game Award.

Isotope 244's game Land Air Sea Warfare received positive reviews and was selected by Apple Inc. as the first iPad Game of the Week.

== Games ==
- Atomic Cannon (2003)
- Acky's XP Breakout (2004)
- Atomic Battle Dragons (2006)
- Machines at War (2007)
- Land Air Sea Warfare (2010)
- Machines at War 3 (2012)

== 3D screensavers ==
- Sliders (1999)
- Desktop Destroyer (1999)
- Liquid Desktop (1999)
- Picture Cube 3D (2000)
- Snowflake 3D (2000)
- Static TV (2001)
- Real 3D Matrix (2003)
- Simple Life (2004)
- Tropical Island Escape (2006)
