= Pros and Cons =

Pros and cons, derived from the Latin words "pro" (for) and "contra" (against), may refer to:

- Pros and Cons (TV series), a television series that aired from 1991 to 1992
- Pros & Cons, a 1999 film starring Larry Miller and Tommy Davidson
- Pros & Cons (comic strip), a comic strip by Kieran Meehan
- Decisional balance sheet, a table of pros and cons

== Episodes ==
- "Pros and Cons", an episode of Garfield and Friends
- "Pros and Cons", an episode of The A-Team
- "Pros and Cons", an episode of Super Café

== See also ==
- Con (disambiguation)
- Pro (disambiguation)
- Issue mapping, a diagram in which pros and cons are types of nodes
