= Fish Tycoon =

2004 casual video game

- Developer: Last Day of Work
- Publisher: Big Fish Games (PC) Majesco (Nintendo DS)
- Designers: Arthur Humphrey; Carla Humphrey
- Platforms: Windows, Windows Mobile, Android, Tapwave Zodiac, Mac OS X, Nintendo DS, iOS, mobile phone, Palm OS
- Release: May 3, 2004: Zodiac; NA: May 3, 2004 Windows Mobile; NA: November 8, 2004 Windows; NA: November 16, 2005 Macintosh; NA: June 8, 2006 Nintendo DS; NA: October 16, 2007; EU: March 14, 2008; AU: April 28, 2008 iOS; NA: November 20, 2008
- Genre: Business simulation
- Mode: Single-player

Fish Tycoon is a casual game created and developed by Last Day of Work. One of the top-selling downloadable games of 2004, 2005, and 2006, Fish Tycoon was later ported to cell phone, retail, and Nintendo DS.

== Gameplay ==
Players take on the role of a fish store owner who must breed and care for hundreds of different kinds of exotic fish, all the while attempting to keep the fish store economically viable long enough to achieve the ultimate objective: breeding the Seven Magic Fish of Isola. The story for this game is that on the mysterious island of Isola there was a lagoon where the most magnificent fish swam. These fish were held together by the 7 magic fish but one day all of the fish have disappeared. Thus, the player has to cross-breed fish to rediscover the 7 magic fish, solve the genetic puzzle, and "restore the island to its former glory."

== Awards ==
- Parents' Choice Award 2004
- iParenting Media Award 2006
- Handango Champion Award 2005
- PocketPC Magazine Best Software Award Nominee edeedxerStar Award 2005
