= Warfare Incorporated =

2003 video game

- Developer: Spiffcode
- Platforms: Palm OS, Pocket PC, Tapwave Zodiac, Windows Mobile, iOS, Android, HTML5
- Release: September 12, 2003
- Genre: Real-time strategy
- Modes: Single-player, multiplayer

Warfare Incorporated is a real-time strategy game, released in 2003. It was developed by American studio Spiffcode and published by Handmark for Palm OS, Pocket PC, PDAs, Tapwave Zodiac and iOS. In 2014 the game became open-sourced and freeware under the name Hostile Takeover.

== Plot ==
The iOS version of Warfare Incorporated, showing an alien duplication machine.

Warfare Incorporated is set in a future ruled by super corporations engaged in no-holds-barred competition for the resources of the galaxy. The game focuses on two specific corporations (ACME and OMNI), who are fighting over the newly discovered planet Icarus, which holds a great wealth of galaxite, a rare and valuable mineral needed for teleportation. Players take the role of Andy Whitmore, a junior executive at the underdog ACME Exploration Corporation, who discovered Icarus. The player must attempt to work their way up the corporate ladder by mining the planet and finding missing security specialist Gordon Fox. Over the course of the game, ACME discovers mysterious alien technologies, such as a machine that can duplicate objects, as well as a new enemy for humanity.

== Gameplay ==
The game has similar gameplay to Command & Conquer and StarCraft, but it combines elements of both. It was one of the first applications for PDA to feature Bluetooth and Wi-Fi multiplayer support.

=== Online Gameplay ===
Players have the option to play online multiplayer as well as campaign, using a variety of maps designed by Spiffcode Inc. Users may also download custom-made maps created by other users. Players can either decide to make an account in order to qualify for leaderboards or to play anonymously.

=== Map Editor ===
Players can create and publish their own maps with Spiffcode's desktop-based mission editor, "M". The latest version of the map editor was released in 2009.

== Development ==
Warfare Incorporated was developed by Spiffcode and published by Handmark for Palm OS, Pocket PC, PDAs and Tapwave Zodiac in 2003. In 2008, it was ported to iOS devices. In July 2014 the game's source code and content got open-sourced with the BSD license under the name Hostile Takeover on GitHub. As result the game was ported by the game's community to alternative platforms like the Pandora handheld.

== Reception ==
Reception

Aggregate score
Aggregator	Score
GameRankings	85% (iOS)

Review scores
Publication	Score
GameSpot	8.3/10 (Zodiac)
MacLife	4/5 (iOS)
Pocket Gamer	9/10 (iOS)

Awards
Publication	Award
Handheld Gaming	Best Product (2003)
PDArcade	Best Strategy Game (2003)
Palm	Game of the Year (2003)
Palm Powered Up	Game of the Year (2004)

The game was well received by critics, and won multiple awards upon its initial release, including Handheld Computing's "Best Product (2003)", PDArcade's "Best Strategy Game (2003)", Palm Magazine's "Game of the Year (2003)" and Palm Powered Up's "Game of the Year (2004)."

Reviewing the Tapwave Zodiac version in 2004, GameSpot's Avery Score scored the game 8.3 out of 10. He praised the implementation of the controls on the Zodiac, noting that RTS games usually only work on PCs because of the availability of keyboard controls. They also praised the multiplayer aspect of the game and the depth of the gameplay. They concluded that, "Warfare Incorporated is one of the best games on the Zodiac, and, in fact, it's one of the best mobile representations of the RTS genre to date."

The 2008 iOS port also received positive reviews, holding an aggregate score of 85% on GameRankings.

MacLife's Joe Rybicki scored the port 4 out of 5. He criticized the graphics and sound as outdated, but praised the variety of gameplay, concluding that "Though it looks, and especially sounds a bit dated, Warfare Incorporated offers a meaty helping of familiar real-time strategy challenge. Pocket Gamer's Fraser MacInnes was more impressed, scoring the game 9 out of 10 and giving it a "Gold Award." He praised the storyline, controls, balanced difficulty and depth, writing "Warfare Incorporated is a benchmark RTS on iPhone and packs plenty of bang for your buck."
