= Cubis =

Cubis is a surname. Notable people with the surname include:

- Alex Cubis (fl. 2015), Australian actor
- Denis Cubis (fl. 1962–1970), Australian rugby league player

== See also ==
- Cubis 2, 2004 video game
