= Last Day of Work =

American video game studio

Last Day of Work (LDW)
- Type: Private
- Industry: Video games
- Founded: 2002
- Founder: Arthur Humphrey; Carla Humphrey
- Headquarters: San Francisco, California, United States
- Website: ldw.com

Last Day of Work (LDW) is a video game developer specializing in casual games. The company developed real-time "virtual Life" simulation games including Fish Tycoon, Plant Tycoon, Virtual Families, and the Virtual Villagers series for platforms including PC, Mac, iPhone/iPod touch, Palm OS, and Windows Mobile Pocket PC. Last Day of Work was founded by CEO Arthur Humphrey and is based in San Francisco, California.

== Games ==
- EZ Blackjack
- Video Poker Teacher
- Pocket Paigow (Casino Games)
- Little Pocket Pet (2003)
- Plant Tycoon (2003)
- Fish Tycoon (2004)
- Village Sim (2005)
- Virtual Villagers: A New Home (2005)
- Virtual Villagers 2: The Lost Children (2007)
- Virtual Villagers 3: The Secret City (2008)
- Virtual Families (2009)
- Virtual Villagers 4: The Tree of Life (2010)
- Virtual Villagers 5: New Believers (2011)
- Virtual Families 2: Our Dream House (2012)
- Virtual Town (2015)
- Virtual Villagers Origins 2 (2017)
- Fish Tycoon 2 (2018)
- Virtual Families 3: Our Country Home (2020)
- Virtual Villagers 6: Divine Destiny (2024)
- Virtual Villagers 7: The Falling Star (2026)
