= Commuter newspaper =

Type of newspaper for reading during commute

A commuter newspaper is a class of newspapers that are often free daily newspapers and "part of a lifestyle of commuting into work. They represent a 'fast read' for those with busy lifestyles, and tend to be rack-selected take-ones." The first commuter newspapers included Vancouver's The Georgia Straight, the Montreal Mirror, and New York City's The Village Voice.

In keeping with the newspaper's intention to provide brief and direct accounts of the day's news, the paper's writing is more simplistic, intended to give readers the facts and news they desire succinctly. Accordingly, there are fewer sections in Metro than a traditional paper, and each section is much thinner. Instead of relying on subscriptions these papers are usually supported by advertising revenue.

== History ==
Metro International was founded in Sweden in 1995. The idea behind the commuter paper was "news for free, at the right place and the right time. A free daily newspaper distributed in high-traffic commuter zones and public transport networks." In 1997, Metro introduced a Prague edition of the paper two years later, and by 2008 published 58 editions in 19 countries and 15 languages, and was based in Stockholm. Ottawa's RushHour, for instance, was introduced in 2006 and is available at 120 distribution points throughout the Canadian city, at points where commuters board public transit vehicles for the daily trip home. Metro is likewise available within subways stations and bus terminals as well as at secondary distribution points such as grocery stores, coffee shops and business towers, as well as in boxes on the street.

Although the idea of free distribution has been used for decades (such as Vancouver's The Georgia Straight, Montreal Mirror and New York City's The Village Voice) it was started by newsagents in the nineteenth century. “Metro is the new face of old media”, the paper's site accordingly claims a reader to have tweeted. While the commuter paper clearly does revert to some old-fashioned practices, it also incorporates the very modern devices of cell phones and iPads with apps tailored to each medium.

Metro's first Canadian offshoot was launched in Toronto, Canada in 2000 and since the brand has opened branches in Montreal, Ottawa, Calgary, Vancouver, Halifax, London and Winnipeg, Canada.

== Audience ==
Commuter Newspapers and “Take-Ones” appeal to a more youthful population than mainstream newspapers. They are intended to be skimmed, not to be thoroughly absorbed and appreciated as a work of journalism. These papers are arguably less about the artistic or journalistic quality of the paper and rely on facts. They have fewer frills and fewer opinions than the traditional newspaper.

39% of Metro's print audience is between the ages of 18 and 34, 80% of its readers are either employed or students and 76% live in the city. Metro is, as most newspaper and magazine publications now are, available interactively, online and through wireless devices. Of Metro's interactive users, 49% are between the ages of 18 and 34, 79% are employed or students and 59% live in and around the city of Toronto. In keeping with this audience, presumably to appeal to youthful readers, Metro had pop mega-star Lady Gaga as guest editor on May 17, 2011, the week Gaga's album Born This Way was released. This special edition of the paper seemed to function as a way for Metro to increase its readership among its young, pop-culture-conscious readers while simultaneously providing a fruitful promotion opportunity for Lady Gaga. In Canada alone, Metro reaches approximately 1.4 million readers through its print editions on a daily basis. and claims to have 741, 365 unique visitors to its website monthly, as well as upwards of 2.3 million page views.

For some theorists, the rise of the commuter paper was a democratizing force, bringing news to a larger, and more broad audience.

== Metro ==
Metro is the leading free national daily newspaper brand in Canada, and the first national daily to be published in both official languages. Metro's target audience is what it calls YAMs (youthful, active, metropolitans). To reach this audience the paper employs traditional newsprint, as well as online and mobile formats and finally through apps for BlackBerry, iPhone, and Android phones, and most recently the tablet. Metro brings relevant daily updates and unique global inspiration at the right time and in the right format to enhance the YAMs' quality of life. Metro has a unique global reach - attracting a young, active, well-educated, metropolitan audience of over 24.8 million daily readers and more than 37 million weekly readers.

Through its print editions alone, Metro reaches more than 1.4 million readers daily and 3 million readers over the course of a week through our print editions. Guinness Book of World Records has named Metro the world's largest global newspaper and it is also the fastest-growing one, Metro is published in over 55 editions in 24 countries and over 200 major cities worldwide including Prague, Florence, Paris and Amsterdam. Metro claims to have 50/50 male to female readership, something a paper such as The Globe and Mail has struggled with for years, eventually introducing a "Lifestyle" section to address this very problem.

Like other traditional papers that have struggled, The Halifax Daily News, known for tackling issues such as racism, patronage and city planning, was shut down on February 11, 2008 by owner Transcontinental Media, who launched a local edition of the free Metro to replace it.

== Commuter newspaper versus the traditional newspaper ==
Unlike more traditional papers, which rely on subscriptions to make a profit, these papers are usually supported by advertising revenue. Since its launch, Metro has provided an opportunity for advertisers “to influence a very hard-to-reach audience – young, active, well-educated, urban, professionals”. Metro offers advertisers creative formats and solutions, sampling and alternative distribution opportunities.

Some of Canada's largest and most successful newspapers, The Globe and Mail and The Toronto Star have also recently made their papers smaller, if only centimeters shorter when unfolded and held open. For the commuter paper, its size is reduced more so in terms of the thickness of the paper itself, due to its thinner sections. This is another element of the paper that makes it easy to travel with on the daily commute. A copy of Metro can be folded up and slid into one's briefcase, or left sitting on the seat in the subway.

Companies and/or individuals can come to have great influence over a publication due to the money they contribute to getting the paper printed. The interest of take-ones, if they wish to keep running, can easily become about their advertisers' interests rather than their own journalistic ones. Since commuter newspapers are ad-revenue based, it is possible that it would be susceptible to corporate bias or bias from advertisers trying to slip their products into the paper's stories. This, in theory, could lead to a less consistent, and ultimately a less trustworthy paper, however this concern is not unique to the take-one format. Though other Canadian newspapers such as the National Post or the Toronto Star often do include many advertisements, the line between the commuter newspapers that are supported chiefly by advertising revenue, and regular newspapers which are not, becomes more and more blurred as newspaper readership and subscription continues to decline and even traditional newspapers need to rely more heavily on advertisers. These standard-format newspapers are part of large media conglomerates which may also be serving their own interests, for instance advertising for other companies or products associated with the brand.

One benefit of the commuter paper is that, in an age increasingly concerned with environmentalism, the commuter newspaper theoretically cuts back on the amount of paper printed: fewer papers can be produced, since one paper will reach the hands of more than one reader. The newspaper itself also requires less paper due to its condensed size. The UK's “Project Free Sheet” is an activist group opposing the waste created by the relentless distribution of free papers by news hawkers. The group wants “to see all free newspapers distributed via vendors or bins" so that the free papers are taken only by people who actually want them. This will limit circulation numbers to more realistic levels, so that our recycling infrastructure is able to divert as many papers from landfill as possible.”
