= Atomic Battle Dragons =

2005 video game

- Logo of Atomic Battle Dragons
- Developer: Isotope 244
- Designer: James Bryant
- Composers: subatomicglue (Music); IndieSFX (Sound)
- Platforms: Windows; Pocket PC
- Release: December 2005
- Genre: Jousting/Joust remake
- Mode: Single Player

Atomic Battle Dragons is a jousting and platform game on dragons featuring two-dimensional graphics. It is a remake of the Williams classic arcade hit Joust from 1982. It was developed by Isotope 244 and released in December 2005.

== Gameplay ==
In-game graphics depicting a duel of jousting in Atomic Battle Dragons. In this situation, the player (on the green dragon, left) would lose the joust against the enemy dragon rider (flying, right) who is in a higher position.

The gameplay is based on the 1982 jousting game Joust by Williams. However, the sprites are much larger and pre-rendered.

The player takes the role of a knight, armed with a lance and rides a battle dragon (instead of an ostrich as in Joust). Just as in Joust, flying is done by flapping the wings of the dragon and each button press corresponds to one wing flap.

Each level consists of a floor and floating stone platforms above. Some levels have lava pits in the ground floor and ladders or ropes that connect the higher platforms. The screen scrolls vertically and horizontally to keep the player centered. On most platforms are pads marked by a flag where enemy dragons are born and where the player can resurrect their dragon. The most common enemy type are dragon riders in different colors but using the same sprite and animations, but there are also floating crystals and giant insects among others.

The objective of the game is to defeat all enemies in each level. This is done by jousting. When the player and a minion collide, the one flying higher at that moment wins and the other one loses life energy, indicated by a bar in the upper part of the screen. When both are flying at the same height, neither loses energy. When the energy bar is depleted, the dragon rider loses their dragon and has to walk on foot in search of the nearest "resurrection pad" to retrieve their dragon. In this phase, the knights are very vulnerable. Only in some levels, they can attack flying enemies with ballistas. The player can eliminate wandering knights by having their dragon either eat them or grab them and throw them into a lava pit.

There is an Arcade mode with over 100 levels and a Story mode with 40 levels divided into four graphically distinct zones, with a giant boss at the end of each and featuring an upgrade system.

== Plot ==
The introduction to the story mode in Atomic Battle Dragons. The first impression of Belzom, the final enemy of the game... and the last encounter with him for William, the brother of Lord Cain.

In the Story Mode of the game, the player assumes the role of Lord Cain. Illustrated by still images and text, he learns from the Elven magician Briannah that his brother, knight William, was killed in battle by the three-headed dragon Belzom. Cain vows to take revenge for his brother and to save the kingdom from the flying dragon army of Belzom. The Elven Council gives Cain the task to retrieve three "items of legend", the first one being a Stone Shield made from the "Glowing Obelisk" which can be found to the north in the "field of stone towers" where lava flow.

== Reception ==
The game received positive reviews, notably from:

- Pocket Gamer
- Game Tunnel
- Pocket PC Magazine
- Daily Gadget
- Just RPG
- Pocket PC Magazine
- Mozongoware
