= SmartCell Technology =

American mobile app developer

SmartCell Technology, LLC
- Company type: Private
- Industry: Mobile applications development
- Founded: 2001
- Founder: Bruce Wang
- Defunct: 2011
- Fate: Closed
- Headquarters: Irvine, California, United States
- Number of locations: Headquarters in Irvine, California; Development center in Shanghai, China
- Key people: Bruce Wang (President and CEO)
- Products: Mobile applications

SmartCell Technology, LLC was a mobile applications developer with its headquarters in Irvine, California, United States, and a development center in Shanghai, China. Commonly referred to as "SmartCell" for short, the company was founded in 2001 by its president and CEO, Bruce Wang, whose previous involvements have been with mobile technology. SmartCell has developed a number of mobile applications using its proprietary technology, called HCM Technology, which is shorthand for High-performance, Cross-platform Mobile Technology.

At end of 2010, SmartCell closed user-account system. That means SmartCell stopped almost all of their business. At middle of 2011, SmartCell closed its history.

== History ==
Using its proprietary HCM Technology, SmartCell has developed a number of mobile applications since 2001 that supports Windows PC and a number of mobile devices, including Palm OS, Windows Mobile Pocket PC, and Windows Mobile Smartphone. Their best-selling program, TextPlus, which improves the speed and accuracy of text entry with dictionary-based suggestion of words and phrases, supports Palm OS and Windows Mobile Pocket PC. Senior System Analyst, Steve Sharp, divulged in a review of TextPlus that the strength of the program lies in its ability to "learn" commonly used words.

== HCM Technology ==
HCM Technology is shorthand for High-performance, Cross-platform Mobile Technology. Unlike technologies that are based on running a virtual machine on the target platform, the HCM technology is developed using highly efficient language C. It integrates with native OS at binary level and maintains a universal programming interface at the top thus enables deploying large-scale applications across various mobile and stationary platforms.

== Shadow of Legend ==
Late 2006, SmartCell Technology began the development of Shadow of Legend, which would be the world's first high performance, cross-platform MMORPG (Massively Multi-player Online Role Playing Game) targeted to mobile devices. In August 2007, Shadow of Legend started closed-Beta testing where registered players could assume the roles of world heroes as they explore, adventure, and quest across the vast world of "Agnes".

Shadow of Legend allowed thousands of players, whether they were on their PC or mobile device, to simultaneously interact with each other in the same world. Some players at the time reported seamless connection and gameplay from their mobile devices, others reported a number of bugs that were supposed to be fixed.

SmartCell Technology held in-game contests in order to promote the game. Their last contest was called the "King of Agnes" Leveling-Up contest.

A release date for the final version of the game was never reached, the company did decide to make the game free to play upon its final release.

In 2008, SmartCell stopped mobile device support for Shadow of Legend.

On 15 July 2010, SmartCell officially closed Shadow of Legend.
