= Plant Tycoon =

2003 video game

- Developer: Last Day of Work
- Publisher: Last Day of Work
- Designers: Arthur Humphrey, Carla Humphrey
- Platforms: Windows, Mac OS X, Palm OS, Windows Mobile
- Release: Palm OS; November 8, 2003; Windows Mobile; August 2, 2004; Windows; September 7, 2007; Mac OS X September 11, 2007
- Genres: Life simulation, Business simulation
- Mode: Single-player

Plant Tycoon is a life simulation game about the breeding and growing of plants, published by independent developer Last Day of Work.

== Plot ==
Players take on the role of the owner of a plant nursery, who must breed and care for more than 500 different kinds of exotic plants, all the while attempting to keep the plant store economically viable long enough to achieve the ultimate objective: breeding the six Magic Plants.

Along the way, they can catch insects which are then added to a kind of "trophy" room, the duplicates of which can earn the player a significant amount of cash.
