= Sitrion =

Software Company

- Type: Private
- Founded: 2004
- Headquarters: Denver, Colorado, United States
- Key people: Greg Reinacker (Founder); Daniel Kraft (CEO)
- Products: Social Sites; Tomoye; Sitrion ONE; Limeade ONE
- Number of employees: 85
- Parent: Limeade
- Website: Limeade

Sitrion (formerly NewsGator Technologies) is a multinational software company headquartered in Denver, Colorado. Sitrion develops and markets mobility and collaboration software. It was founded in 2004 under the name NewsGator. It was initially a consumer company focused on RSS aggregation, before shifting its focus to the enterprise market. The company raised $12 million in funding in 2007 and acquired Tomoye in 2010. In 2013, NewsGator acquired Sitrion, and in 2014, chose to keep the same name.

In 2018, Sitrion was acquired by Limeade.

== Corporate history ==
Sitrion was founded as NewsGator in 2004 by Greg Reinacker and was initially self-funded. Mobius provided an undisclosed amount of Series A and Series B funding in the early 2000s. A third $6 million round of funding was raised in 2005.

In 2005, the company acquired Bradbury Software, which developed a desktop application called FeedDemon and a CSS/xHTML editor called TopStyle.

Another $12 million in funding was raised in December 2007, followed by $10 million in 2009. From 2004 to 2010, the company's CEO was JB Holston.

In 2010, the company acquired Canada-based Tomoye, an enterprise community and collaboration computing vendor, primarily used by government organizations.

Daniel Kraft became CEO and president in 2012.

In 2013, NewsGator acquired Sitrion, who was previously a business partner. In January of the following year, the company changed its name to Sitrion. Following the purchase of Sitrion, the company began to focus on selling social networking software to client companies —specifically Sitrion Social Workplace.

In 2018, Sitrion was acquired by employee engagement company, Limeade.

== Software ==
A user interface image of the Sitrion ONE collaboration software

=== Sitrion Social ===
Sitrion Social is an add-on for SharePoint, which also integrates with SAP. Version 3.0 of Social Sites (now Sitrion Social) was released in late 2009. Among other improvements, it introduced a microblogging component to the software. In 2012, the company started developing software for vertical markets and products for regulatory compliance in partnership with HiSoftware. A simplified user interface for NewsGator Tomoye was introduced in 2011. Sitrion Social is comparable to Facebook, but designed for use with SharePoint and used for employee collaboration. It is typically used to add functionality to Microsoft SharePoint and SAP processes.

Computers and Applied Sciences reviewed version 2.7 of Social Sites, Sitrion's Facebook-like employee collaboration tool. It praised the software's user interface and synchronization across devices.

=== Past software ===
In 2002, Sitrion (then called NewsGator) originally developed consumer RSS software that allowed users to receive notifications when a blog, news site or other page was updated. It was one of few readers that integrated directly with Microsoft Outlook. In 2003, a version 1.3 was introduced that added support for subscribing to newsgroups through Outlook, automated some of the organization features and made other improvements. Version 2.0 was released in March 2004, which allowed users to get notifications from mobile devices, to access exclusive content and made other improvements. By 2004, it was one of the better known RSS tools. It also made a partnership that year with PR firm Edelman to develop a reader tool called Hosted Conversations used by Edelman clients and available to others. Integration with Factiva was also introduced that year. NewsGator started pursuing the enterprise market in late 2005 with a new NewsGator Enterprise Server (NGES) product.
