= Machines at War =

2007 video game

- Logo of the game
- Developer(s): Isotope 244
- Designer(s): James Bryant
- Platform(s): Windows; Mac OS X Windows Mobile
- Release: 2007
- Genre(s): Real-time strategy
- Mode(s): Single-player

Machines at War is a real-time strategy video game developed by Isotope 244. It is followed by its sequel Land Air Sea Warfare.

== Gameplay ==
The gameplay is inspired by the seminal Command & Conquer series, but Machines at War does not feature infantry units or navy units.

== Reception ==
- Out of Eight PC Game Reviews called it "a straightforward RTS game with some clever ideas" and rated it 6/8.
- Software Review Boffin gave the Mac version 5 stars out of 5 and the Silver badge.
- Inside Mac Games rated the Mac version with 5/5 and praised the destructible environment, but it was criticized that "the only option is to play a quick skirmish against up to three computer opponents".
