= Infinite Dreams Inc. =

Polish video game developer

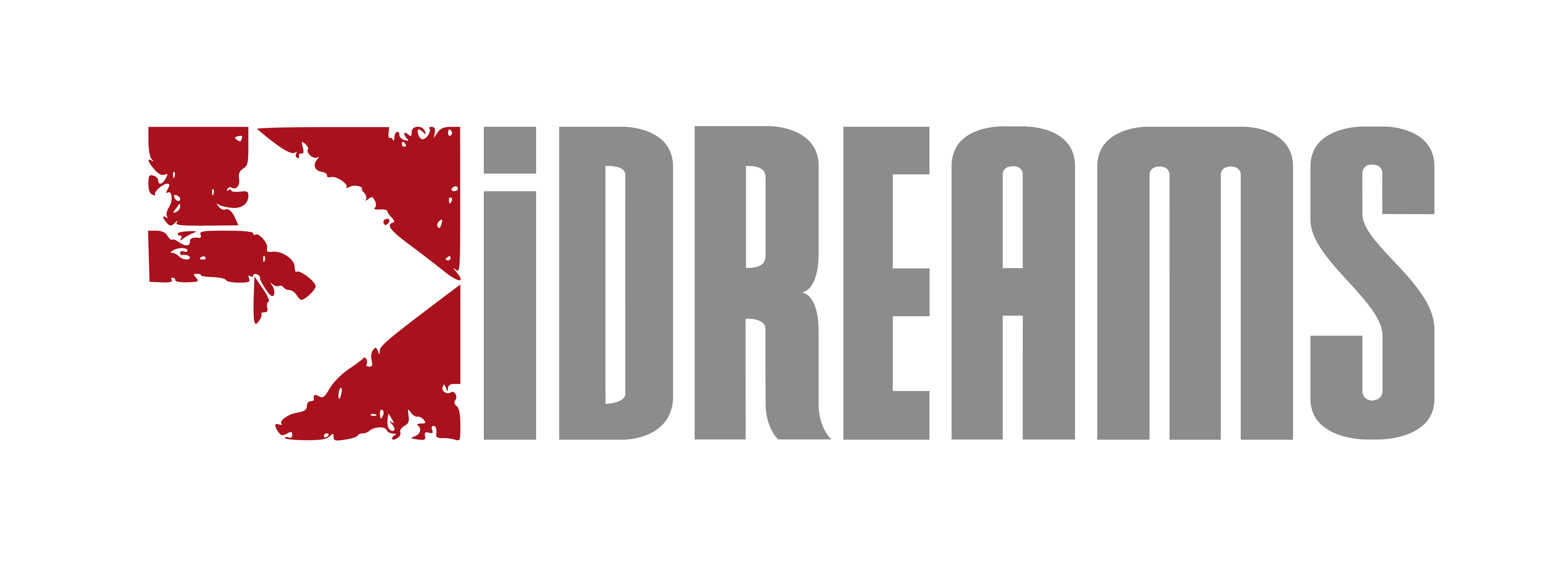
- Type: Sp. z o.o.
- Industry: Video games
- Founded: 1997
- Headquarters: Gliwice, Poland
- Key people: Tomasz Kostrzewski; (CEO); Marek Wyszyński; (COO)
- Number of employees: 15
- Website: www.idreams.pl

Infinite Dreams Inc., or Infinite Dreams, also stylized as iDREAMS, is a game development studio in Gliwice, Poland. Founded in 1997, the company develops games for a range of digital platforms such as iOS, Android, macOS, and two discontinued operating systems, Windows Phone and Symbian. The studio is best known for its Sky Force series. Games developed by Infinite Dreams have been downloaded over 25,000,000 times worldwide.

== Games developed ==
=== Sky Force series ===
- Sky Force – Symbian, Pocket PC (2004), Palm webOS (2005)
- Sky Force Reloaded – Symbian, Pocket PC, Palm webOS (2006), iOS (2009), Android (2010), PSP (2011)(Note: the PSP version of Sky Force Reloaded is simply titled Sky Force.)
- Sky Force 2014 - iOS, Android (2014)(Note: the PC and console version is titled Sky Force Anniversary.)
- Sky Force Anniversary - PlayStation 4 (September 7, 2016), Windows/macOS (April 30, 2015), Xbox One (December 12, 2016), Nintendo Switch (November 8, 2018)
- Sky Force Reloaded(2016) - iOS (May 1, 2016), Android (May 2, 2016), PlayStation 4 (November 28, 2017), Windows/macOS (November 30, 2017), Xbox One (December 1, 2017), Nintendo Switch (February 1, 2018)

=== Other games ===
- Creatures of The Deep – Android, iOS (2022)
- Crazy Dino Park – Android, iOS (2018)
- Shoot The Zombirds – iOS, Android (2012)
- Jelly Defense – iOS, Android, Mac OS X (2011)
- Jelly Band – iOS, Android (2011)
- Shoot The Birds – iOS, Android (2011)
- Can Knockdown 3 - iOS, Android (2013)
- Can Knockdown 2 – iOS, Android (2011)
- Can Knockdown – iOS (2010), Android (2011)
- Let's Create! Pottery – iOS (2010), Mac OS X, Android, Symbian, Nintendo DSiWare (2011), Nintendo WiiWare (2012)
- Sailboat Championship PRO – iOS (2010), Mac OS X (2011)
- Big Roll in Paradise – Symbian, Nokia N-Gage (2010)
- iQuarium – iOS (2009), Android (2010)
- Hooked On: Creatures of the Deep – N-Gage 2.0 (2008)
- K-Rally – Symbian (2006)
- Super Miners – Symbian, Pocket PC (2005), Palm webOS, Windows (2006)
- Explode Arena – Symbian (2004)
- Micromachines – Game Boy Advance (2003)

== Awards ==
- Jelly Defense – Best of Mac App Store 2011
- GameDynamo: Best Mobile Game 2011 [Jelly Defense]
- Meffys 2008 Award [Hooked on: Creatures of the Deep]
- IGN Best of 2011 Nominee / Best Mobile Strategy Game
- Review on the Run: Best iOS Strategy Game of the Year
