= Arinn Dembo =

American author

- Born: February 3, 1970 (age 56); Meadville, Pennsylvania, U.S.
- Occupations: Writer, Game Designer
- Writing career
- Genres: Horror, science fiction

Arinn Dembo (born February 3, 1970) is an American author currently living and writing in Vancouver, British Columbia, Canada. Dembo is best known for her work with Vancouver-based Kerberos Productions, where she was lead writer and has worked on the background fiction for the Sword of the Stars series and Fort Zombie.

She attended the Clarion West Writers Workshop in 1990 and frequently participates in the Workshop's annual Write-a-thon charity to raise money to cover its costs. Dembo holds a bachelor's degree in anthropology with a minor in classical civilizations from the University of Tennessee and a master's degree in classical archaeology from the University of British Columbia.

Published professionally for the first time in the New York Review of Science Fiction in 1991 with an essay on Tim Powers' The Stress of Her Regard, Dembo was primarily a critic in the early years of her career. She was best known as a reviewer in the PC gaming industry and covered more than 100 titles for Computer Gaming World Magazine and CNET between 1995 and 1997. Over the years she has also published short stories, novellas and reviews of books, films, music and DVD releases.

Dembo's novella The Deacon's Tale was published in 2008 by Lighthouse Interactive and packaged with the Sword of the Stars Collector's Edition. A revised edition was published as a full-length novel in 2011 by Kthonia Press. Monsoon and Other stories, a collection of short fiction and poetry including the award-winning "Monsoon", was published by Kthonia Press in 2012.

In November 2019, Dembo joined the Executive Board of SF Canada, the professional association of Canadian speculative fiction authors. She served as President of the association until January 2022.

== Bibliography ==
=== Poetry ===
1. "Three Desert Poems", published in Raindrops Literary Review (1999)
2. "Severity", published in Raindrops Literary Review (1999)
3. "The Crown", published in Raindrops Literary Review (2001)
4. "The Humanist's Prayer", published by The Manitoba Humanist (2004)
5. "The Other Wife: An Invocation to the Goddess Kali", published in H.P. Lovecraft's Magazine of Horror #4 (2006)
6. "The Zombie's Prayer", published in Monsoon and Other Stories (2012)
7. "Waste", published in Weird Tales #361, Summer 2013

=== Essays ===
1. "Impassion'd Clay: On Tim Powers' The Stress of Her Regard", published in The New York Review of Science Fiction (1991)
2. "We Are Indra", published in Radiant Reason: the New Humanism (1999)
3. "Offerings at the Tomb", published in The New York Review of Science Fiction (2001)
4. "The Last Continent: An Exchange", published in The New York Review of Science Fiction (2001)

=== Short stories ===
1. "Sisterhood of the Skin", published in The Magazine of Fantasy & Science Fiction (1996)
2. "Between the Lines", published in Imagination Fully Dilated: Science Fiction (Fairwood Press, 2003)
3. "When Push Comes to Shove", published in The Vancouver Courier (2004)
4. "Indigestion", published in The Vancouver Courier (2005)
5. "Monsoon", published in Best Fantastic Erotica (Circlet Press, 2008)
6. "ICHTHYS", published in H.P. Lovecraft's Magazine of Horror (2009)
7. "Sacred Heart", published in Monsoon and Other Stories (Kthonia Press, 2012)
8. "The Words" (also published as Words from the Dark Inkwell of the Heart, Kthonia Press, 2012) published in Monsoon and Other Stories (Kthonia Press, 2012)
9. "The Passenger", published in Monsoon and Other Stories (Kthonia Press, 2012)
10. "The Uncertainty Principle", published in Lamp Light Magazine, Volume 2, Issue 2, December 2013
11. "Agave", published in Gods, Memes and Monsters (Stoneskin Press, 2015)
12. "Memphre-Magog", published in Gods, Memes and Monsters (Stoneskin Press, 2015)
13. "Magna Mater", published in She Walks In Shadows (Innsmouth Free Press, 2015)
14. "Imperial Ghosts", published in Deep Magic: The E-Zine of Clean Science Fiction and Fantasy(December 2016)
15. "The Tomb of the Winds", published in Pathfinder Adventure Path #113: What Grows Within (January 2017)
16. "The Old Man Down the Road", published in What October Brings: a Lovecraftian Celebration of Halloween (Celaeno Press, 2018)
17. "Quirks", published in On Spec, (2022)

=== Novellas ===
1. Suicide Watch, published in Delta Green: Dark Theatres (2001)
2. The Deacon's Tale, published by Lighthouse Interactive as an extra in the Sword of the Stars Collector's Edition (2008)

=== Books ===
1. The Deacon's Tale: a Sword of the Stars Novel, published by Kthonia Press (2011)
2. Monsoon and Other Stories, published by Kthonia Press (2012)

=== Video games ===
1. Homeworld, by Relic Entertainment/Sierra Entertainment, wrote the background descriptions for the Paktu, the Manaan and the Soban, as "Marcus Skyler" (1999)
2. Ground Control, by Massive Entertainment/Sierra Online, as "Marcus Skyler" (2000)
3. Homeworld: Cataclysm, by Barking Dog Studios/Sierra Entertainment, wrote the histories for the Kaalel, the LiirHra and some of the historical background fiction for the Somtaaw, as "Marcus Skyler" (2000). Also voice acting.
4. Arcanum: Of Steamworks and Magick Obscura, by Troika Games/Sierra Entertainment, as "Marcus Skyler" (2001)
5. Sword of the Stars, by Kerberos Productions/Paradox Interactive (2006), writer/voice actor (Tarka/various)
6. Sword of the Stars: Born of Blood, by Kerberos Productions/Paradox Interactive (2007), writer/voice actor (Zuul researchers)
7. Sword of the Stars: A Murder of Crows by Kerberos Productions/Paradox Interactive (2008), lead writer/voice actor (various)
8. Sword of the Stars: Argos Naval Yard by Kerberos Productions/Paradox Interactive (2009), lead writer/voice actor (various)
9. Fort Zombie by Kerberos Productions/Paradox Interactive (2009), lead writer
10. Sword of the Stars II: The Lords of Winter, by Kerberos Productions/Paradox Interactive (2011), lead writer/voice actor (The Siren/various)
11. Sword of the Stars II: End of Flesh, by Kerberos Productions/Paradox Interactive (2012)
12. Sword of the Stars: The Pit, by Kerberos Productions (2013)
13. Sword of the Stars: Ground Pounders, by Kerberos Productions (2014)
14. Kaiju-A-Gogo, by Kerberos Productions (2015)
15. The Pit: Infinity, by Kerberos Productions (2019)
16. Hoards of Glory, by Kerberos Productions (2020)
17. Planetary Control!, by Kerberos Productions (2021)
18. Sword of the Stars: The Pit 2, by Kerberos Productions (2021)
19. Northstar, by Kerberos Productions, space trading ship simulation, in development

=== Tabletop Games ===
1. The Sword of the Stars Premium Lore Book, by Kerberos Productions (2016), a hardcover source book for the Sword of the Stars universe.
2. Puppetland: The Story-Telling RPG of Grim Make Believe, by Arc Dream Publishing (2016), contributed three scenarios: "Pretty Polly", "The Box", and "The Bottler".
3. THE PIT: The Board Game, by Kerberos Productions (2018), a cooperative dungeon crawler based on Sword of the Stars: The Pit
4. Sword of the Stars: Control!, by Kerberos Productions (2018), a competitive card game based on the planetary conquests of the Sword of the Stars 4X games

=== Acting ===
1. Jesus H. Zombie (2006), as zombie schoolteacher
2. Cannibal Sisters (2006), as "Lady Lunch" real estate agent
