= Homeworld (series) =

Video game series

- Genre: Real-time strategy
- Developers: Relic Entertainment (1999–2003); Barking Dog Studios (2000); Beenox (2004); Gearbox Software (2015); Blackbird Interactive (2016–present); Stratosphere Games (2022); FarBridge (2024)
- Publishers: Sierra Entertainment (1999–2003); Aspyr (2004); Gearbox Publishing (2015–present)
- Platforms: Microsoft Windows; OS X; iOS; Android
- First release: Homeworld; September 28, 1999
- Latest release: Homeworld 3 May 13, 2024

Homeworld is a series of real-time strategy video games created by Relic Entertainment. Relic Entertainment developed the first two Homeworld games (Homeworld and Homeworld 2). The series then spent over a decade in dormancy until Gearbox Software acquired the franchise in 2012 and tasked Blackbird Interactive to develop Homeworld 3, the third mainline installment of the franchise, and the spin-off game Homeworld: Deserts of Kharak. Homeworld Mobile was released in 2022.

== Games ==
Release timeline
1999	Homeworld
2000	Cataclysm
2001
2002
2003	Homeworld 2
2004
2005
2006
2007
2008
2009
2010
2011
2012
2013
2014
2015	Remastered Collection
2016	Deserts of Kharak
2017
2018
2019
2020
2021
2022	Homeworld Mobile
2023
2024	Vast Reaches
2024	Homeworld 3

=== Relic Entertainment era (1999-2003) ===
==== Homeworld (1999) ====
Set in space, the science fiction game follows the Kushan exiles of the planet Kharak. The survivors journey with their spacecraft-constructing mothership to reclaim their ancient homeworld, encountering a variety of pirates, mercenaries, traders, and rebels and forging unlikely alliances along the way.

Homeworld was developed by Relic Entertainment and published by Sierra Studios. It was Relic Entertainment's debut title. Game developers, Alex Garden and Rob Cunningham, sought to "marry the gameplay of Command & Conquer with the feel of Battlestar Galactica - all in a full 3D environment". The game received critical acclaim when it was released in 1999, and went on to become a commercial success, selling more than 500,000 in its first six months. Homeworld was considered an influential title, as it was the first RTS video game that allow players to move units in a fully three-dimensional space rather than being limited to a two-dimensional plane.

==== Homeworld: Cataclysm (2000) ====
A standalone expansion for the game, Homeworld: Cataclysm, developed by Barking Dog Studios, was released in 2000. The story follows a small mining clan named Kiith Somtaaw, which encounters a race of hostile nanobots that threaten the peace of the galaxy. Cataclysm is not part of the Remastered Collection, though it was re-released by GOG.com as Homeworld: Emergence in June 2017. The title of the expansion was changed as the name "Cataclysm" was trademarked by Blizzard Entertainment for its third expansion to World of Warcraft.

==== Homeworld 2 (2003) ====
Homeworld 2's story continues the struggle of the Hiigarans, who encounter a new threat that forces them to leave their homeworld and embark on a journey into the "oldest regions of the galaxy".

Relic Entertainment once again led the development of the sequel. It was released in 2003. The game was a critical success and was considered to be a visual upgrade over its predecessor. Homeworld 2 is the last Homeworld game developed by Relic Entertainment, which moved on to develop games including Warhammer 40,000: Dawn of War and Company of Heroes after being acquired by THQ in 2004.

=== Gearbox Software era (2012-present) ===
While THQ confirmed in 2007 that it had acquired the rights to the series from Sierra, it did not commission the development of any new game in the series. When THQ filed for chapter 13 bankruptcy in 2012, Sega acquired Relic Entertainment, while Gearbox Software acquired the rights to the Homeworld intellectual property for $1.35 million. Other bidders for the IP rights include Aspyr Media and Paradox Interactive. When Gearbox purchased the rights to Homeworld, it admitted that the studio had no long-term plan for the franchise.

Both Homeworld and Homeword 2 were remastered by Gearbox Software. The remastered version was released as Homeworld Remastered Collection in February 2015, though Cataclysm was not included as its source code was lost at that time.

==== Homeworld: Deserts of Kharak (2016) ====
In the game, Chief Science Officer Rachel S’jet must lead an expedition across the desert planet of Kharak to investigate an all-powerful artifact which may save the planet and their species from extinction. Deserts of Kharak is a prequel to the first Homeworld and a spin-off game of the franchise. Due to the desert setting, the gameplay focuses on vehicular combat, terrain control and ground battles instead.

Rob Cunningham, one of the co-founders of Relic, founded Blackbird Interactive in 2007 and began working on a real-time strategy game named Hardware: Shipbreakers. The team approached THQ for publishing, though the talks subsequently faltered. Blackbird was outbid by Gearbox during the THQ auction, though it sparked dialogue between Gearbox and Blackbird to turn Hardware into a Homeworld title. The game was then renamed to Homeworld: Shipbreakers, before further renaming to Homeworld: Deserts of Kharak.

Released in January 2016, Deserts of Kharak received generally positive reviews.

==== Homeworld Mobile (2022) ====
Gearbox also partnered with developer Stratosphere Games and released Homeworld Mobile for iOS and Android in October 2022. Gearbox described the game as a free-to-play strategy massively multiplayer online game (MMO).

Common Sense Media had some issues with the game's controls and user interface but in the end called it "one of the deepest, most complex strategic experiences" on the mobile market.

==== Homeworld: Vast Reaches (2024) ====
A virtual reality game titled Homeworld: Vast Reaches was announced in April 2024. The game is being developed by Farbridge.

==== Homeworld 3 (2024) ====
Blackbird Interactive led the development of the third installment of the franchise. While Gearbox fully funded the game's development, Blackbird and Gearbox launched a successful mixed crowdfunding/investment campaign on Fig in late 2019 which went on to generate the highest donation average in the platform's history. The game was released on May 13, 2024.

== Other media ==
A tabletop role-playing game named Homeworld: Revelations was announced in October 2019. It was developed by Modiphius Entertainment. The studio partnered with Gearbox and Blackbird, and employed Martin Cirulis, one of the writers for the first Homeworld game, for the project.

A board game titled Homeworld Fleet Command, also developed by Modiphius Entertainment, was announced in August 2022.
