= Sword of the Stars =

2006 video game

- Developer: Kerberos Productions
- Publishers: Paradox Interactive (current); Lighthouse Interactive (former)
- Producer: Christopher Stewart
- Designer: Martin Cirulis
- Programmer: Darren Grant
- Artist: Chris Gerspacher
- Composer: Paul Ruskay
- Platform: Microsoft Windows
- Release: NA: August 22, 2006; EU: September 8, 2006; Born of Blood: NA: June 5, 2007; EU: July 20, 2007; A Murder of Crows: NA: September 2008; EU: October 10, 2008
- Genres: Turn-based strategy, real-time tactics
- Modes: Single-player, multiplayer

Sword of the Stars is a space 4X game developed by Kerberos Productions. In the game the player chooses one of four unique races to form an interstellar empire and conquer the galaxy. In order to win, the player must expand territory by colonizing new star systems, exploit the resources available to their colonies, design and build starships, and improve their empire's technology through research and strategy.

Sword of the Stars consists of turn-based strategic gameplay highlighted by real-time battles. Each of the four races has a unique method of strategic movement among other differentiators. Also the game provides a high amount of randomness from technology availability, to map features, to large scale independent threats. Sword of the Stars is fully multiplayer-capable allowing players to leave and enter the game at will. Finally it features a detailed ship design system and the simulation of combat using a physics-based engine instead of probability calculation, provides a large variety in combat engagements.

== Gameplay ==
The game is turn-based with battles played out in real-time, similar to the Total War series of strategy games. In the latest version of the game, there are six different alien races to choose from, each with its unique form of faster-than-light travel and preferred technologies. These races include humans, insect-like Hivers, dolphin-like Liir, reptilian Tarkas, marsupial Zuul, and the crow-like Morrigi. Each of the races has been supplied with a detailed history and back story that adds flavor to the game.

The goal with Sword of the Stars was to create a relatively fast-paced multiplayer-focused game. To that end, there are timers in place to limit the duration of strategic turns, as well as the duration of the battles, which are fought in real-time. When a player leaves, he or she is replaced by an AI that is given specific orders as to how to continue play. Any game can be saved and then later continued, both on-line and off-line.

=== Ship design and combat ===
There are three different types of hull sizes available, namely destroyer, cruiser, and dreadnought. Players must design new ships to take advantage of breakthroughs in technology. Ship design is a streamlined affair. A ship consists of three sections: command, mission, and engine. The mission sections define the ship's purpose (e.g. armor, sensor-jamming). Command sections can add a secondary function to the ship, such as a deep scan ability. The engine section determines the speed of the vessel. Each section also has hard points of various size (small, medium, large, and special) to which weapons can be attached.

The game's combat model uses a hybrid 2D/3D model that has the user controlling the battle on a 2D plane but allowing the ships to move in three dimensions automatically (such as to avoid collisions). Weapon accuracy is determined by the size of a cone of fire; more accurate weapons have tighter cones of fire. Shots are then tracked from initial firing until they hit maximum range; in this, it is possible for a projectile to hit something it was not even aiming at, or for a shot that might have missed to hit as an opposing ship maneuvers itself into the line of fire. Damage is applied to the affected section or turret, depending on the location hit. The game tracks individual polygons, making it possible to target very specific areas of an enemy ship, such as individual turrets.

=== Research ===
There are hundreds of technologies to research in Sword of the Stars, a few of which are also unique to each of the game's alien races. Aside from a number of core technologies, most other technology tracks are randomized at the start of the game, so that there is some uncertainty with respect to which technologies will be available to the player in any given game. Probabilities are weighted by race and influenced by the racial back stories. For example, the Liir are proficient in the field of Biotech. Research is funded as a portion of an empire's income, and can be adjusted via a slider.

== Development ==
The game was developed by Kerberos Productions, which was formed by a group of former Barking Dog Studios employees who had earlier worked on the game Homeworld: Cataclysm, an expansion to Relic Entertainment's space real-time strategy game Homeworld. The game was in development for more than two years with a budget of $1.5 million.

A total of three expansions were released in addition to numerous free patches and updates.

The first expansion, Born of Blood, was published in 2007, and introduced a new race, the Zuul, as well as new features, namely trading and commerce raiding and, in the case of the Zuul, slave raiding. A bundle of the "gold" edition of the original game and this expansion pack, along with a bonus disc featuring, among other things, concept art, was released on May 28, 2008, under the title Sword of the Stars: Collectors Edition.

A second expansion, A Murder of Crows, was released in 2008. This expansion introduced a new, sixth race, the crow-like Morrigi, as well as some new technologies, the addition of civilians to planet populations, and new Dreadnought-sized orbital stations. Players were required to have either the first expansion or the bundle to install and play this expansion pack. Soon after Paradox Interactive took over publishing duties a new bundle was released on April 17, 2009 called Sword of the Stars: Ultimate Collection. This bundle featured the original game and the two expansions.

A third and final expansion pack was released on June 17, 2009, called Argos Naval Yard. This pack introduced new ship sections, technology, and weapons. In order to use this pack players were required to own both the original game and the previous two expansions. On May 6, 2010, the Sword of the Stars: Complete Collection was announced for digital download. This bundle features the original game (updated to version 1.8.0), all expansion packs, and some bonus material in the form of exclusive maps.

== Reception ==
=== Sword of the Stars ===
Sword of the Stars

Aggregate score
Aggregator	Score
Metacritic	68/100

Review scores
Publication	Score
1Up.com	D+
Computer Games Magazine	2/5
Computer Gaming World	(unfavorable)
Game Informer	7.5/10
GamePro	2.75/5
GameSpot	7.4/10
GameZone	7.6/10
IGN	7.7/10
PC Gamer (US)	89%
PC Zone	83%

The game received "average" reviews according to the review aggregation website Metacritic.

PC Gamer said: "While Sword of the Stars doesn't possess the battlefield variety of the "Homeworld" games that inspired it, it remains an ambitious and engrossing strategy triumph."

Perhaps the most negative review was written by Tom Chick of 1UP.com, who summarized it as "[a] misguided attempt at a streamlined strategy game". His main criticisms focused on how little information the interface supplied to players and how difficult it was to navigate the game's main map screen and technology interface. Some controversy arose when the lead designer of Sword of the Stars, Martin Cirulis, discovered that Tom Chick had written the manual for Galactic Civilizations II and then accused Chick of having a vested interest in seeing Sword of the Stars fail. Tom Chick addressed this issue on his website, claiming that the "one-time" payment he had received for the manual did not represent a conflict of interest in reviewing a rival title in the same genre.

=== Expansion packs ===
Sword of the Stars: Born of Blood

Aggregate score
Aggregator	Score
Metacritic	79/100

Review scores
Publication	Score
GameSpot	7.5/10
GameZone	7.5/10
IGN	7.2/10
PC Gamer (US)	78%
PC Zone	82%

Sword of the Stars: A Murder of Crows

Aggregate score
Aggregator	Score
Metacritic	75/100

Review scores
Publication	Score
GameZone	7.5/10
IGN	7.2/10

Sword of the Stars: Argos Naval Yard

Aggregate score
Aggregator	Score
Metacritic	95/100

The game sold well enough to warrant the release of three expansion packs. Reviews of the expansions were generally more favorable than those of the original game, with reviewers pointing out that the development team did take some of the criticisms and suggestions on board to improve interface issues and various gameplay elements.

== Sequel ==
On January 27, 2010, a sequel was announced by Kerberos, titled Sword of the Stars II: Lords of Winter. It was released October 28, 2011. The sequel was panned by critics.
