= Homeworld: Vast Reaches =

- Developer: FarBridge
- Publisher: Gearbox Software
- Platforms: Meta Quest 2, Meta Quest 3
- Release: May 2, 2024
- Genre: Real-time strategy
- Mode: Single-player

Homeworld: Vast Reaches is a virtual reality real-time strategy game developed by FarBridge and published by Gearbox Software. It was released in 2024 on the Meta Quest 2 and Meta Quest 3, with plans to release it as a PC VR title later in the year. It is a part of the Homeworld series of games.

The game takes the mechanics used in the other Homeworld titles and adapts them for use in a VR game. The player controls units in "control groups," which allow for easier control in the VR setting. The plot takes place between the games Homeworld and Homeworld 2.

== Gameplay ==
Homeworld: Vast Reaches is a real-time strategy game set in space. Gameplay, as in most real-time strategy games, is focused on gathering resources, building military forces, and using them to destroy enemy forces and accomplish an objective. The game features only a single-player mode, as opposed to other Homeworld releases, which included multiplayer and skirmish modes. The campaign consists of a six to eight hour story-driven campaign broken up into 11 levels.

To adapt the Homeworld series to virtual reality, ships are managed by the player in "control groups," and the player builds units and manages each control group with virtual reality gestures and controls. The central ship of the player's fleet is the mothership, a large base which in previous Homeworld games was where ships were constructed and upgraded. Resources can be spent by the player on building new ships; unlike in previous Homeworld games, ships are no longer constructed inside of the mothership, appearing instead directly inside of control groups. Buildable ships come in a variety of types, which are discovered over the course of the game as the story progresses.

The Quest gives the option to play the game in mixed-reality mode – the Quest's outer cameras will place the game's ships inside of the player's room around them. The Quest 3 uses its color cameras while the Quest 2 only supports a black-and-white mixed-reality mode. Camera controls use a combination of gestures, the player's vision, and the Quest controller triggers to allow the player a wide freedom of movement.

=== Plot ===
The game's plot takes place between Homeworld and Homeworld 2, when the Fleet Command Karan S’jet has disconnected from the mothership. Because of this, a new and more aggressive Fleet Command, Tyrra Soban, takes over as Karan teaches her how to manage the fleet. The fleet fends off a new enemy, which IGN's Dan Stapleton described as a faction of "techno-fetishist bureaucrats [...] that are easy to hate."

== Development ==
Developer FarBridge is based in Austin, Texas. The development team built Vast Reaches for VR from the beginning, focusing on the challenges of creating the controls for a VR Homeworld game as one of their top priorities. The release of Vast Reaches was announced on April 23, 2024, on social media, with its Meta Quest release date confirmed for May 2, 2024 and a PC VR release date later in the year.

== Reception ==
IGN's Dan Stapleton gave Vast Reaches a mixed review, calling it "an unsatisfying lite" version of Homeworld. Stapleton noted that although the game captured the series's look and feel well, but that the simplified controls in VR were "underwhelming" and that it takes away some of the details that made Homeworld memorable. In a more positive note, Tomas Franzese of Digital Trends pushed back on Stapleton's criticism of the game's easier difficulty, noting that it allowed Vast Reaches to be a good starting place for people new to the series.
