= Project Eagle =

Interactive game

- Developer: Blackbird Interactive
- Composer: Paul Ruskay
- Engine: Unity
- Release: 27 November 2018

Project Eagle is an interactive art demo of a colony on Mars, developed by Blackbird Interactive in collaboration with NASA's Jet Propulsion Laboratory. It was released on Steam on 27 November 2018, in honor of the successful InSight landing.

== Production ==
Project Eagle was built in the Unity and utilizes design elements similar to that of the RTS game Homeworld: Deserts of Kharak, including the sensors manager view and camera systems.

The Martian terrain was generated using radar data from NASA's HiRISE camera on board the Mars Reconnaissance Orbiter.

Project Eagle is set in 2117 in a hypothetical future after the first human colonists arrive on Mars in the year 2034. The fictional "Eagle Base" is located at the foot of Mount Sharp (Aeolis Mons), in Quad 51 of Aeolis Palus in Gale Crater, near the site of the Curiosity rover landing. The Curiosity landing site is marked with a plinth in Project Eagle.

== 2017 D.I.C.E. Summit ==
Project Eagle was presented on stage at D.I.C.E. 2017 by NASA's Dr. Jeff Norris, and BBI's CEO Rob Cunningham and CCO Aaron Kambeitz. The talk took place directly after the conference keynote speech by Jeffrey Kaplan from Blizzard Entertainment. There, Jeff Norris said: "We wanted to publicly exhibit a project that shows what this medium could do for inspiring space exploration".
