= Blackbird Interactive =

Canadian video game development studio

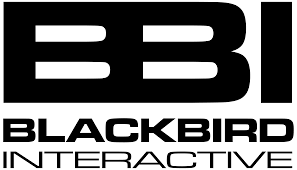
- Type: Private
- Industry: Video games
- Founded: 2007
- Headquarters: Vancouver, British Columbia, Canada
- Key people: Rob Cunningham, CEO; Yossarian King, CTO; Jon Aaron Kambeitz, CCO; Eric Torin, COO
- Products: Homeworld series
- Number of employees: 330
- Website: blackbirdinteractive.com

Blackbird Interactive is a Canadian video game development studio based in Vancouver, British Columbia.

== History ==
Blackbird was founded in 2007 by former members of Relic Entertainment and EA Canada. CEO Rob Cunningham and chief creative officer Jon Aaron Kambeitz had also been founding members of Relic, and had been on the development team for the 1999 RTS Homeworld and its 2003 sequel, Homeworld 2. In 2010, after beginning operations, Blackbird began working on a game they considered a "spiritual successor" to Homeworld, entitled Hardware: Shipbreakers. The studio entered into negotiations with THQ, which controlled Relic, for adapting their original game into a Homeworld game, but were unable to secure access to the intellectual property.

THQ went bankrupt in April 2013 and sold off its assets at auction. Blackbird and Gearbox Software were among the bidders for the IP rights to Homeworld; Gearbox won the auction at $1.35 million. Gearbox allowed Blackbird to use the Homeworld IP and invested in the Hardware: Shipbreakers project, which was renamed Homeworld: Shipbreakers in September 2013. In December 2015, it was officially announced for release as Homeworld: Deserts of Kharak; it was released on January 20, 2016.

In February 2017, Blackbird announced a collaboration with NASA's Jet Propulsion Laboratory to create Project Eagle, an interactive art model of a base on Mars to be demonstrated live on stage at the 2017 D.I.C.E. Summit.

In August 2019, Blackbird announced that it had begun development of a new Homeworld title, Homeworld 3, as a direct sequel to Homeworld 2, released in 2003. As of the announcement date, the game was still in pre-production stages, and a tentative release date of late 2022 was given. Many key developers of the first two Homeworld games returned to lead the development of Homeworld 3, including Blackbird CEO Rob Cunningham and Homeworld soundtrack composer Paul Ruskay.

In November 2019, Blackbird announced that it had been involved in the development of Minecraft Earth.

Blackbird revived the Shipbreaker name and concept with the space salvage simulator Hardspace: Shipbreaker, which was released in early access on June 16, 2020.

From September to December 2021, Blackbird trialed the four-day work week with two of its teams, one of which was the team behind Shipbreaker. The trial was a success, with the majority of developers surveyed stating that it improved their work-life balance, wellness, and ability to complete work. The studio intends to implement the four-day work week across all of its teams, beginning in April 2022.

Citing the cancellation of several unannounced projects, Blackbird Interactive laid off 41 employees in August 2023. In February 2024, Homeworld 3 was delayed from March 8 to May 13 in order to incorporate player feedback from the game's demo release. That same month, another round of layoffs took place.

In August 2025, Blackbird Interactive announced that it had acquired the intellectual property rights of the Hardspace franchise from Focus Entertainment, and revealed that it had multiple Hardspace projects in development. The studio also signed with indie game publisher Lyrical Games for the development of a new title.

== Games developed ==
Year	Title	Publisher	Platform(s)	Note(s)
2016	Homeworld: Deserts of Kharak	Gearbox Software	Microsoft Windows, OS X	Spin-off to the Homeworld series.
2018	Project Eagle	Blackbird Interactive	Microsoft Windows	
2019	Minecraft Earth	Xbox Game Studios	Android, iOS, iPadOS	Assisted Mojang Studios.
2022
2022	Hardspace: Shipbreaker	Focus Entertainment	Microsoft Windows, PlayStation 5, Xbox One	Released via early access in 2020.
2022	Crossfire: Legion	Prime Matter	Microsoft Windows	
2023	Minecraft Legends	Xbox Game Studios	Microsoft Windows, PlayStation 4, PlayStation 5, Xbox One, Xbox Series X/S, Nintendo Switch	Developed along with Mojang Studios.
2024	Homeworld 3	Gearbox Software	Microsoft Windows	
TBA	Earthless	Blackbird Interactive	Microsoft Windows	Released via early access in 2024.
