= Strike Suit Zero =

2013 video game

- Developer: Born Ready
- Publisher: Born Ready
- Composers: Paul Ruskay, Kokia
- Platforms: Microsoft Windows, Linux, OS X, PlayStation 4, Xbox One, Android, Nintendo Switch
- Release: Microsoft Windows; January 23, 2013; OS X, Linux; August 9, 2013; PlayStation 4, Xbox One; April 4, 2014; Android; November 13, 2014; Nintendo Switch; May 2, 2019
- Genre: Space combat simulator
- Mode: Single-player

Strike Suit Zero is a space flight combat game developed by Born Ready. Strike Suit Zero seeks to revive the space combat genre by introducing "strike mode" as a new element to the dogfight-based gameplay of classic space combat games. Strike Suit Zero takes its inspiration from numerous different franchises, most notably Elite and related franchises: Homeworld, Freelancer, Colony Wars, Star Wars, Gundam, Macross and FreeSpace. The game is built on a proprietary engine. It was released for Microsoft Windows on January 23, 2013, and for OS X and Linux on August 9, 2013.

Strike Suit Zero is a story-driven single player game where the player assumes the role of a fighter pilot of a transforming mecha for the United Nations of Earth (U.N.E) in a massive war against the combined forces of the space colonies. The game is designed so that the battles do not revolve entirely around the player; a complete battle simulation between allied and enemy forces will be going on in the background while the player performs specific objectives, giving the impression that the player's role is only one small part of a much larger conflict.

The soundtrack is developed by Paul Ruskay, composer of the original Homeworld soundtrack. Ship designs were done by Junji Okubo, known for designing mecha and ships for the game Infinite Space.

Strike Suit Zero reached its funding goal of $100,000 on Kickstarter on November 2, 2012.

A spin-off game titled Strike Suit Infinity was released in April 2013.

A new version of the game called Strike Suit Zero: Director's Cut was released in April 2014 for Xbox One, PlayStation 4 and Windows. It features graphical overhaul, restructured campaign and additional content. An Android port was released in November 2014. It was released on Nintendo Switch on May 2, 2019.

== Gameplay ==
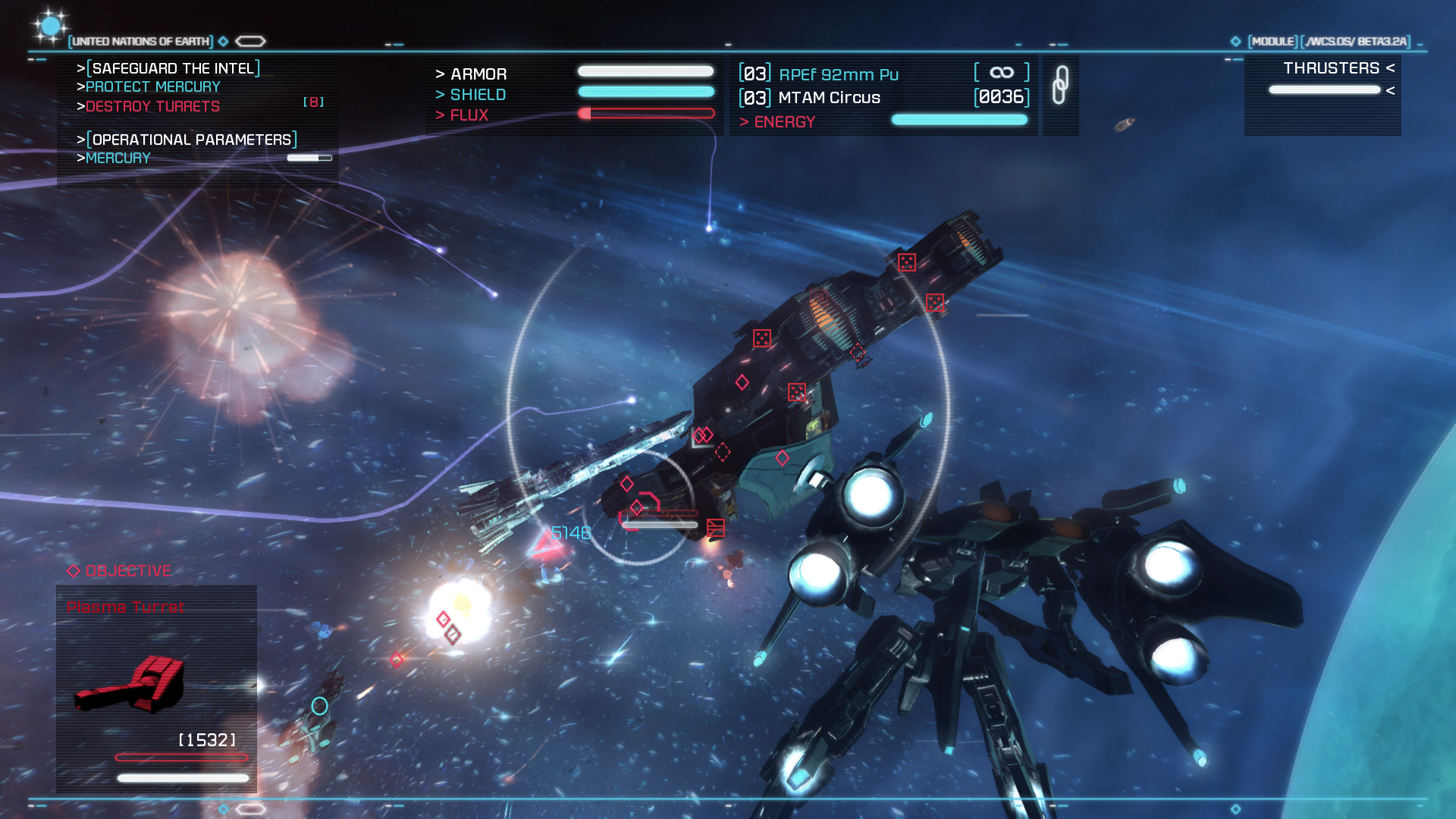
Strike Suit Zero gameplay screenshot

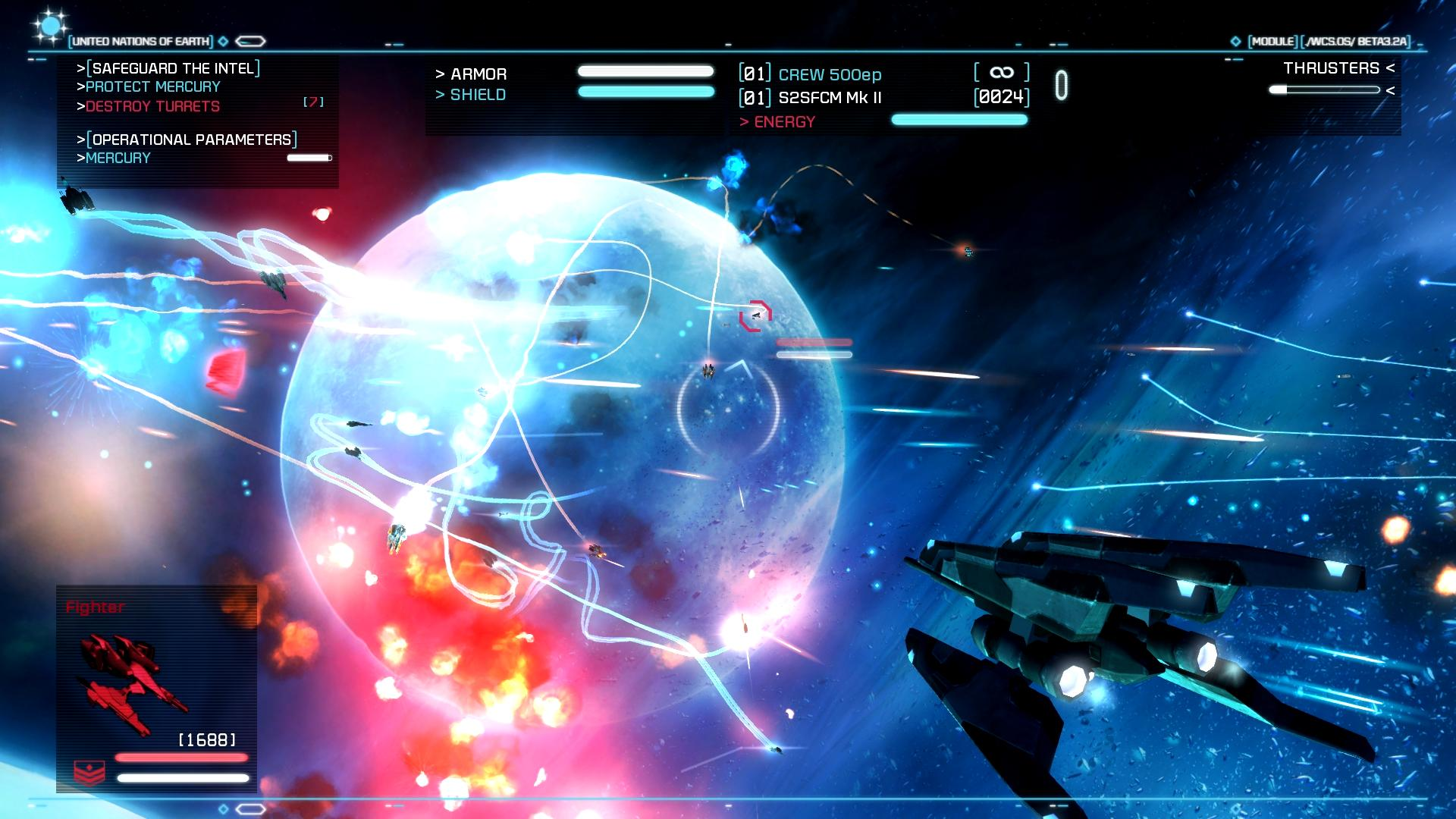
Strike Suit Zero gameplay screenshot

Strike Suit Zero is a sequential mission-based game, aiming to resurrect arcade-style space shooters from the 1990s such as Freespace 2. However, it adds more tactical considerations to the recipe than traditional space shooters: energy-based weapons will be dependent on a limited supply of energy, missile and gun ammunition will be limited, and successful mastery of the strike suit will require effective juggling between fighter-mode and strike-mode.

The game features a third-person view and first-person cockpit view. The game will support HOTAS joysticks and Oculus Rift.

=== Playable craft ===
Strike Suit Zero has four types of craft available to the player. These include an interceptor, fighters, bombers and the Strike Suit (a form of transforming mecha) itself, along with two variations.

=== Weapon systems ===
A wide variety of weapon systems are offered to the player, with upgrades and new weapons unlocked as the game progresses. Players are able to customize their ships with different weapons and upgrades. Weapons include plasma cannons, machine guns, lasers, unguided rockets and various types of missiles.

Fire-and-forget missiles, Semi-active homing missiles, Swarm missiles, Anti-Capital ship missiles and unguided rocket pods are featured in the game.

=== Non-playable units ===
The enemy forces utilize interceptors, fighters, heavy fighters and missile-armed fighters as well as larger ships including corvettes, frigates and cruisers.

Space stations and stationary weapon platforms will also be present in the game.

== Reception ==
=== Critical reception ===
Reception

Aggregate scores
| Aggregator | Score |
|---|---|
| GameRankings | (PC) 67.24% (XB1) 65.15% (PS4) 67.56% |
| Metacritic | (PC) 66/100 (XONE) 67/100 (PS4) 68/100 |

Review scores
| Publication | Score |
|---|---|
| Eurogamer | 3/10 |
| GameSpot | 7.5/10 |
| IGN | 7.5/10 |

Strike Suit Zero received average reviews. Aggregating review websites GameRankings and Metacritic gave the PC version 67.24% and 66/100, the Xbox One version 65.15% and the PlayStation 4 version 67.56%.

IGN praised the dazzling art style, high-speed zero gravity vehicular combat, branching-mission structure, ship designs from renowned Mechanical Design engineer Junji Okubo (Appleseed: Ex Machina, Steel Battalion) and music from award-winning sound designer Paul Ruskay (Homeworld). GameSpot also praised it mentioning that "Strike Suit Zero's thrilling combat and awe-inspiring world make space combat feel like a relevant genre after years of stagnation" while Eurogamer heavily criticized it affirming that "The Strike Suit really should be awesome. Instead it's hugely frustrating, makes you get hit an awful lot, and just made me want to play a proper game."
