= Sword of the Stars II: Lords of Winter =

2011 video game

- Developer(s): Kerberos Productions
- Publisher(s): Paradox Interactive
- Producer(s): Christopher Stewart
- Designer(s): Martin Cirulis
- Programmer(s): Darren Grant
- Artist(s): Chris Gerspacher
- Writer(s): Arinn Dembo
- Composer(s): Paul Ruskay
- Platform(s): Microsoft Windows
- Release: NA: October 28, 2011; EU: November 18, 2011
- Genre(s): Turn-based strategy, real-time tactics
- Mode(s): Single-player, multiplayer

Sword of the Stars II: Lords of Winter is a science fiction strategy video game developed by Kerberos Productions. It is the sequel to the 2006 game Sword of the Stars and is published by Paradox Interactive. It features the same six races as the original game along with a new enemy, the Suul'ka. On October 19, 2012, Kerberos gave the 'all-clear' rating, stating the game is now in an acceptable state and support for the project will continue indefinitely. In late 2012, the End of Flesh expansion was made available for free to all owners of the game, simultaneous with the release of the Enhanced Edition which bundles the original game with the expansion. The game received negative reviews from critics.

== Reception ==
Reception

Aggregate score
Aggregator	Score
Metacritic	44/100

Review scores
Publication	Score
Game Informer	3/10
GameSpot	3/10
IGN	2.5/10
PC Gamer (UK)	(Enhanced) 55% 43%

The game received "generally unfavorable reviews" according to the review aggregation website Metacritic.

Game Informer summarized the game as "A Total Disaster", explaining that "This might be a decent game after six more months of twice-weekly patching. Right now, it's a failure on every level." Kerberos released multiple updates following release, including an all-clear patch and the late 2012 End of Flesh expansion.

Nonetheless, impressions remained generally negative: PC Gamer UK found the Enhanced Edition "hobbled by bizarre design decisions."
