= David J. Williams =

American novelist

- Born: March 5, 1971 (age 55); Hertfordshire, England
- Occupation: Novelist
- Writing career
- Genre: Science fiction
- Website: www.autumnrain2110.com

David J. Williams (born March 5, 1971) is a British-born American science fiction writer and video game writer. His debut novel, The Mirrored Heavens, was described as "Tom Clancy interfacing Bruce Sterling" by Stephen Baxter, and is part of the Autumn Rain Trilogy, with a sequel entitled The Burning Skies released in June 2009.

Though Jack Campbell has called Williams' debut novel a "21st century Neuromancer", others have questioned whether Williams' work is in fact cyberpunk. However Williams has responded in interviews that the Autumn Rain trilogy is more of a hybrid spy-thriller and science fiction work than strictly cyberpunk.

Williams keeps an active blog at his website, and comments on various future weapons, war strategies and terrorism.

Williams is also an alumnus of the Clarion West Writers Workshop which he attended in 2007.

== Video game career ==
Williams is credited with story concept for Relic Entertainment's videogame Homeworld.

Williams was lead writer on the January 2016 game Homeworld: Deserts of Kharak.

== Bibliography ==
In 2008 Williams signed a three book agreement with Bantam Spectra. The trilogy titles include:

- The Mirrored Heavens (2008)
- The Burning Skies (2009)
- The Machinery of Light (2010)
- Transformers: Retribution (2014)

Williams also co-authored the Star Wars story "Blade Squadron", which is credited as the first addition to the new Star Wars canon since the April 2014 reboot.
