= Hardspace: Shipbreaker =

2022 video game

- Developer: Blackbird Interactive
- Publishers: Focus Entertainment (2022-2025); Blackbird Interactive (2025-)
- Directors: Trey Smith; Elliot Hudson
- Engine: Unity
- Platforms: Microsoft Windows; PlayStation 5 Xbox Series X/S
- Release: Windows; May 24, 2022; PS5, Xbox Series X/S; September 20, 2022
- Genres: Simulation, action-adventure
- Mode: Single-player

Hardspace: Shipbreaker is an action-adventure simulation video game developed by Blackbird Interactive and originally published by Focus Entertainment. In the game, the player works as a ship breaker by exploring and dismantling abandoned spacecraft in search of useful materials, while at the same time tackling the labor relations issues within their employer. The game was released on Windows via early access in June 2020, and was released in full in May 2022. The game received generally positive reviews upon release. Versions for PlayStation 5 and Xbox Series X/S were released in September 2022.

== Gameplay ==
In the game, the player is tasked with exploring derelict spaceships and salvaging useful materials.

Hardspace: Shipbreaker is a simulation game played from a first-person perspective. In the game, the player assumes control of a shipbreaker employed by Lynx Corporation. The player must salvage useful materials in abandoned spaceships in exchange for credits so as to pay off the massive debt the player character owes to Lynx. The player is equipped with various gadgets. They can use a tether tool to pull themselves towards large objects or pick up small items. They can also use a laser cutter to incise key structure or sever large objects. A scanner can also be used to identify possible hazards. The ships featured in the game are procedurally generated, and each of them features potential hazards that can kill the player. For instance, players may accidentally cut through electrical wires or coolant pipes, resulting in a huge explosion. They may also trigger an uncontrolled decompression, causing the player, alongside all objects and items in a room, to be flushed out from the ship. One of the most valuable items in the game is the ship reactor. Once it is pulled out from its coolant casing, players need to bring it to the deposit location as quickly as possible or else it will melt down and trigger a huge explosion. As players explore the ship, they also need to manage their resources such as oxygen and thruster fuel. All missions were timed, though the studio subsequently introduced an Open Shift mode that removes the time restraint.

With every successful operation, players are given Lynx Tokens, which can be used to upgrade and repair the player's tools at the personal habitation pod. The pod is also where players select the ships. By completing work orders, players earn certification ranks, which allows them to unlock new tools and access larger and more challenging missions. Weekly competitive challenges were added into the game in August 2020.

== Synopsis ==
=== Background ===
By the early 24th century, humanity has colonised the Solar System, and the Earth is plagued with various issues, such as civil unrest, food shortages, and climate change. The player character, who is desperate to leave Earth and relocate to other colonies, signed an exploitative contract with Lynx Corporation to become one of its shipbreakers, who are responsible for salvaging abandoned spacecraft in search of useful materials. After signing the contracts, the player character becomes the official property of Lynx. When they die at the worksite, Lynx, which also owns the character's DNA sequence, can reconstitute the player and return them to work.

=== Plot ===
The player character, designated Shipbreaker #9346-52 (addressed variously by others simply as "52", "Rookie", or "Cutter"), is assigned to the Lynx Corporation salvage yard at Morrigan Station in orbit around Earth, to work off the $1.2 billion debt accumulated from signing up for the program. They are introduced to the other workers on their crew: Lou Steiner, Kaito Kovetchin, DeeDee Curazon, and the foreman, Joseph Weaver, who is the main point of interaction. As the player progresses through their contracts, Weaver takes a liking to the new shipbreaker, and eventually offers them his old ship, named Beulah for his mother, to fix up for themselves, using parts retrieved from salvaged ships. At the same time, Lou introduces them to the private E-mail server of an illegal unionization movement made up of disaffected Lynx employees pushing for better working conditions, in particular protesting against the "EverWork" program that allows Lynx to reconstitute shipbreakers to continue working when they are killed on the job.

In order to combat the growing union sentiment, Lynx sends administrators to oversee the shipbreaker crews. The administrator sent to Weaver's crew, Hal Rhodes, pushes them forward without any regard for proper training or safety, and regularly berates the crew for not reaching their quotas. The naive Kaito becomes a particular target for Rhodes' ire, causing Lou to stand up to Rhodes in his defense. Lou continues to agitate for unionization, while Weaver attempts to reason with Rhodes. Matters reach a head when Kaito reveals the union movement's secret E-mail server to Rhodes, who discovers a message from Lou condemning his methods. Rhodes immediately fires her and removes privileges from the remaining shipbreakers, including taking Weaver's ship from the player character. Rhodes' petty cruelty ultimately leads Weaver and his crew to agree with Lou's standpoint and push for industrial action, deliberately sabotaging the work in order to damage Lynx's profits.

When Kaito threatens to deposit an overloading ship's reactor into a furnace, Rhodes deletes Kaito's EverWork profile, meaning he will not be reconstituted if he is killed, and threatens to go after the crew's families for their debts. The reactor explodes and destroys Kaito's salvage yard, much to the horror of both the crew and Rhodes, believing Kaito was killed in the blast; however, he is revealed to have survived, having lost contact due to a malfunction in his suit helmet's microphone. Since all communications during salvage shifts are recorded per Lynx policy, Weaver leaks Rhodes' tirades during the incident to the media, resulting in protests and a massive drop in Lynx's corporate stock. The Stellar Commission condemns Lynx's EverWork program as a human rights violation, and Lynx is forced to reimburse their workers for most of their debts and agree to recognize the workers' union. Rhodes is demoted back to his old job in salvage processing, Weaver retires and returns to Earth, Lou is rehired, and DeeDee becomes the temporary foreman.

If the player has finished salvaging parts for the ship and is out of debt, they can choose to legally terminate their Lynx contract and leave Morrigan Station in the Beulah, setting out for Jupiter.

== Development and release ==
Canadian studio Blackbird Interactive conceptualised the game in one of the Blackbird's internal game jam sessions after the studio completed the development of Homeworld: Deserts of Kharak (2016). Initially named Hello, Collector, the game was about navigating procedurally generated asteroids using a grappling hook in order to collect loot. It was largely influenced by Gravity, but the team felt that the game slowly adopted a "cosmic horror" tone and that its gameplay was too slow. The game then evolved to become Falling Skies, which was an action game in which players need to grapple onto and sever objects falling onto the Earth. Hudson described this iteration of the game as "Fruit Ninja in space". The team liked the slicing mechanic, but they were not satisfied with the game's dramatic shift of tone, and they worried that the game would be too generic.

As the development progressed, the team was inspired by the Canadian independent film Shipbreakers which documented work on the beach of Alang in India, where hundreds of workers were working on dismantling abandoned cargo ships. Creative director Elliot Hudson described it as "the shadowy side of the ship industry" and that it inspired the game's theme of exploitation and the concept of playing as a "blue-collar worker". According to the team, it was important for the tools to feel like "heavy industrial equipment" rather than "weapons", so that the gameplay matches with the identity of the player character, who is a worker rather than a soldier. As a result, a weapon that can unleash a "lateral shockwave effect" was removed from the game.

Initially, the team handcrafted all the ships players can explore in the game. However, as they wanted to release the game into early access and felt that releasing a short game would not be ideal, they decided to adopt a "pseudo-procedurally generated" in order to extend the game's replayability. The game was officially announced on February 19, 2020 for PC. Publisher Focus Home Interactive also announced that the game would be released for PlayStation 4 and Xbox One. Hardspace: Shipbreaker was released on Steam's early access program on June 16, 2020. The game left early access on May 24, 2022. After the full release it was added to game subscription and cloud streaming service from Microsoft, Xbox Game Pass. Versions for PlayStation 5 and Xbox Series X/S were released on September 20, 2022.

== Reception ==
Reception

Aggregate score
Aggregator	Score
Metacritic	PC: 82/100; PS5: 79/100; XSXS: 86/100

Review scores
Publication	Score
Destructoid	8.5/10
IGN	6/10
PC Gamer (US)	91/100
Push Square	8/10
Digital Trends	4/5
PC Invasion	8/10
Screen Rant	4/5

Hardspace: Shipbreaker received "generally favorable" reviews, according to review aggregator platform Metacritic.

PC Gamer heavily praised the gameplay and its themes of labor exploitation, writing, "Shipbreaker's derelicts are simply a delight to break apart, and there's a real joy to slowly peeling apart what looks at first glance to be a single, solid object until there's nothing left but dust and loose trash." Digital Trends gave the game an 8 out of 10, and commended its shipbreaking-centric gameplay loop, long-term progression, and vital narrative, but took minor issue with the occasionally nauseating zero-G gameplay and its repetitive nature. Screen Rant gave the title 4 stars out of 5 and praised the engaging nature of the shipbreaking gameplay loop while noting a minor lack of polish. Zoey Handley of Destructoid wrote, "Hardspace: Shipbreaker is successful in just about everything it attempts. Not only is its gameplay extremely replayable and constantly satisfying, but it also manages to stack it all on a very solid narrative foundation." Dan Stapleton of IGN was more critical of the game's intentional tediousness and wrote, "By the end of its campaign, the repetitive objectives and intentionally slow progression made shipbreaking start to feel like exactly what it's simulating: hard labor." Renata Price of Waypoint appreciated the game's depiction of dignity of labour, in which the act of shipbreaking is both mechanically and aesthetically beautiful in itself, only contaminated by the corporation's profit-driven enforcement of harsh deadlines and unsafe working conditions. She compared the Lynx Corporation's shipyard to a company town, with the work being paid in company scrip, as an example of the game's effective critique of modern capitalism.

== Future ==
In August 2025, Blackbird Interactive announced that it had acquired the intellectual property rights of the Hardspace franchise from Focus Entertainment, and revealed that it had multiple Hardspace projects in development.
