= Sword of the Stars: The Pit =

2013 video game

- Developer: Kerberos Productions
- Publisher: Self-published
- Platforms: Microsoft Windows; OS X; Linux
- Release: February 21, 2013
- Genre: Roguelike
- Mode: Single-player

Sword of the Stars: The Pit is a roguelike video game developed by Kerberos Productions. It is set in the universe of the game Sword of the Stars and is self-published through funding from an Indiegogo campaign. It was released on GamersGate on February 21, 2013, and later on Steam on March 8.

The player controls a character exploring an ancient alien facility (called "The Pit") to find a potential cure for a plague that has devastated the human population of the planet. The game's difficulty increases as the player progresses deeper into the alien facility.

A spinoff of the game, The Pit: Infinity, was released November 11, 2019. An official sequel, Sword of the Stars: The Pit 2, was released on early access on Steam October 22, 2021.

== Gameplay ==
Sword of the Stars: The Pit is a 2D roguelike dungeon crawler game. The game is turn-based, using rounds as time intervals to keep track of game mechanics such as movement and combat.

At the start of the game, the player chooses one of 12 possible classes. There are 3 playable classes in the original version of the game, with the 9 other classes available through purchasing game expansions. The original three classes are Scout, Engineer, and Marine. Each class is distinguished by their unique initial starting stats. For example, the Marine starts with a higher amount of the might attribute than the Engineer, which makes them more skilled in melee combat. The Engineer starts with more of the brains attribute than the Marine, making them better at skills such as detecting traps. In addition to varying starting stats, each class begins the game with a different set of equipment which includes food, weapons, and tools.

The goal of the game is to reach the last floor of the pit to find the cure to the plague. There are 30 floors in the original game and 40 floors total with the expansions. Along the way, the player needs to defeat enemies, find collectibles, and monitor their health and hunger meters. If either or both of these meters deplete, the character dies.

With each new floor, the enemies get more difficult and a higher level of skill is needed to accomplish tasks such as opening boxes and repairing devices. In order to keep up with this increasing difficulty, players must level up their characters. Every task completed in the game, such as killing enemies, gives experience points which contribute to the character's overall level. When the character levels up, the player is given points which they can allocate the stats and skills of their choosing.

The player's vision of the floor is limited to the character's field of view. Enemies directly behind the character or behind walls cannot be seen by the player. There is a minimap in the corner of the screen that allows the player to see the floor they are currently on. Each floor has fog of war, only allowing the player to see rooms that they have already explored on the minimap.

== Development ==
=== Crowdfunding ===
Sword of the Stars: The Pit was funded through an Indiegogo campaign with an initial goal of $60,000. The campaign closed on November 14, 2012, after raising $23,941 (40% of its fundraising goal). Despite not reaching full funding, developers completed and released the game 3 months after the campaign closed.

=== Downloadable content ===
Five expansions through downloadable content have been added to the game, upping the original 3 playable characters to 12 and adding more game content, such as weapons, floors, recipes, and enemies. The original expansion was titled Mind Games and was followed by the release of the Gold Edition, which bundled the original game with the Mindgames expansion and added more playable characters.

== Reception ==
Sword of the Stars: The Pit initially received mixed reviews on Metacritic. Destructoid was disappointed that the game didn't challenge their expectations and instead chose to stay in its comfort zone. After five years of updates and content additions to the game, gaming website RPGFan called it "one of the more solid roguelike titles on Steam".
