= The Mirrored Heavens =

Book by David J. Williams

- Author: David J. Williams
- Cover artist: Paul Youll
- Language: English
- Series: Autumn Rain Trilogy
- Genre: Science fiction
- Publisher: Bantam Spectra
- Publication date: 21 May 2008
- Publication place: United States
- Media type: Print (Trade Paperback, Mass Market Paperback)
- Pages: 409(Hardback 1st edition)
- ISBN: 978-0-7394-9590-2
- OCLC: 176950599
- Followed by: The Burning Skies

The Mirrored Heavens is a science fiction novel by David J. Williams. This is the author's debut novel, and the first volume in his Autumn Rain trilogy, which continues with The Burning Skies and The Machinery Of Light. The story begins in the year 2110 where global political power is balanced between the United States and the Eurasian Coalition (a primarily Chinese and Russian alliance). These two powers jointly constructed a space elevator, which is destroyed by a terrorist attack before it can become operational.

The story follows the United States intelligence agents who are attempting to catch those responsible.

== Publication history ==
- 2008, United States, Bantam Spectra ISBN 978-0-7394-9590-2, Pub date 21 May 2008, Hardback
- 2008, United States, Spectra ISBN 978-0-553-38541-0, Pub date 20 May 2008, Paperback
- 2008, United States, Spectra ISBN 978-0-553-90516-8, Pub date 20 May 2008, eBook
- 2009, United States, Spectra ISBN 978-0-553-59156-9, Pub date 27 January 2009, Paperback
