= Global Operations =

2002 video game

- Developer: Barking Dog Studios
- Publishers: Crave Entertainment; Electronic Arts
- Engine: Lithtech 2.4
- Platform: Microsoft Windows
- Release: NA: March 25, 2002; EU: May 10, 2002
- Genres: First-person shooter, tactical shooter
- Modes: Single-player, multiplayer

Global Operations is a first-person tactical shooter video game developed by Barking Dog Studios and co-published by Crave Entertainment and Electronic Arts. It was released in March 2002, following its public multiplayer beta version which contained only the Quebec map. The full game featured thirteen maps and featured both a single player and a multiplayer mode, which supported up to twenty-four players and three teams. Afterwards, a multiplayer demo with only the Antarctica map was released. The game was built on the Lithtech game engine.

== Gameplay ==
The game focuses on firearms in a special forces setting, with a mixture of military and counter-terrorist type themes. The game features a large number of firearms, numbering in the dozens and including a wide selection of handguns and rifles. Many of them can be customized as well; for example, a C-mag and silencer can be added.

The singleplayer and the multiplayer mode offer different specialities (Commando, Recon, Medic, Heavy Gunner, Demolitions Expert and Sniper) with extra abilities and class-specific weapons. All classes can use all other classes' firearms (by picking them up off the battlefield), but each class does not have the same level of skill with a given weapon (such as less precision).

Other features include a life-sign tracking device, as well other game items like tear gas grenades, smoke grenades and medkit. A LAW (Lightweight Anti-tank Weapon) can be used, as well as night vision and thermal vision.

The existing player base has continued improving the game by way of modifications and custom maps.

== Reception ==
The game received favourable initial reception. Actiontrip currently has the game at an 8.1 "very good" rating citing advanced teamwork over Counter-Strike. The game holds a 79 on Metacritic based on 13 critics.
