= Treasure Planet: Battle at Procyon =

2002 video game

- Developer: Barking Dog Studios
- Publisher: Disney Interactive
- Platform: Microsoft Windows
- Release: NA: November 12, 2002
- Genre: Real-time strategy
- Modes: Single-player, multiplayer

Treasure Planet: Battle at Procyon is a real-time strategy video game, part of Disney's Action Game strand, which includes epic 3D ship battles. The game takes place five years after the events of the film, Treasure Planet. The single-player campaign details the story of Jim Hawkins ascending the ranks as a naval officer, and an additional skirmish mode includes several historical and open-map skirmishes.

== Gameplay ==
Ship navigation is controlled with the mouse. Players can set waypoints for the ship's course and attacks targets, Interaction is also featured, such as focusing the viewpoint on objects, initiating docking manoeuvres, firing tow-ropes and grappling hooks, and, when used on the player ship, activating the cloaking device (only available on the Procyon Submersible). In line with the "classical nautical" design of the ships and the universe in general, the speed control is designed to look like an engine order telegraph. There are four speeds, Full Stop, Ahead Slow, Ahead Full and Emergency Full. Speed affects turning rate, a faster speed results in a wider turning circle.

The main focus of the game is engaging in battles. Each ship is loaded with a set number of guns, each in a weapons bank, a weapons hardpoint that can be fitted with certain weaponry depending on its size if allowed by the skirmish or if a new ship is acquired in campaign mode.

Each of these banks are classed as one of three sizes, light, medium and heavy. Light guns are weak but quick to reload, medium strike a balance between the other two, and heavy guns are powerful yet slow to reload. There are also lobbing weapons, which are aimed and fired manually. Light guns tend to be more useful against sails (especially the 'Laser Gatling Gun', which acts like a machine gun), and heavy weapons tend to be useful against the hull.

Most weapons load, aim and fire automatically, the only acts required on the player's part is to maneuver the ship into a position where the desired target is in the desired weapon's line of sight and stipulating when to fire at a specific section of the targeted ship (sails, hull or rudder). Available weapons that work in the standard configuration include carronades, laser-empowered cannons, plasma rocket cannons, beam weapons, laser Gatling guns, harpoons, fire catapults, and net launchers. The border around the weapon banks will turn green when that bank is in range and has line of sight to the target, whether the bank is loaded or not.

Lobbing weapons work differently. The player must place the weapon's charge in the desired location. Often, because a ship is moving, estimation of where the ship will be is crucial to use these weapons effectively. The mortar weapons are long-range and can tear a ship apart if placed correctly. 'Grav Charges' can trap ships in gravity wells, making them easy targets.

A feature of the firing system is 'Panic Fire'. This auto-fires all weapons in range of an enemy, regardless of whether there is an obstacle or not, and whether that enemy is already targeted or not. It only fires fully loaded weapons banks, and does not fire lobbing weapons. Each of the weapons banks will fire to the enemy closest to them, even if there are multiple enemies on one side; it also does not selectively aim at any part of the enemy ship, just at the middle of the hull. Panic Fire is useful when the player is surrounded.

== Modes ==
=== Campaign ===
Five years after the events of Treasure Planet, Jim Hawkins graduates from the Royal Navy Academy and becomes commander of an Imperial patrol boat. As Jim patrols various sectors of the Etherium, Her Majesty's Empire is in the process of negotiating peace with the Procyons, raccoon-like warriors who have been at war with the Empire for centuries. They send a diplomatic fleet under the command of Procyon diplomat Evar to Parliament, the centre of government and home of the Queen, for the peace talks. However, bizarre and almost unstoppable iron ships nicknamed Ironclads wreak havoc in Imperial territory, and pirate raids are a constant.

During his patrols, Jim discovers his old friend Long John Silver's flagship is in command of the pirates aiding the Ironclads. After missing out on a chance to join the fleet scouring the Frontier for Ironclads, Jim is sent to investigate Ironclad activity after finding one apparently lost deep in Empire territory. After locating and destroying an Ironclad base hidden in a nebula, he discovers the Ironclads are Procyon vessels, meant to draw the Navy fleets to the Frontier, allowing the "Diplomatic" Fleet to kidnap the Queen unhindered. Jim is ordered to warn the Empire of the Procyon trap.

They are soon intercepted by Silver's pirate fleet. Jim pursues Silver to a pirate fortress, where he discovers two identical command ships, both commanded by a Silver. Jim learns that Silver was captured by a robot doppelgänger, who has been aiding the Procyons in his name. Together, they destroy the false Silver. Silver regains command of his fleet, and, together with Jim's fleet, rush back to Parliament to stop the Procyons. They arrive at Parliament, only to find the Procyons have already sprung their trap. A massive battle ensues, ultimately resulting in the Procyons' defeat. An enraged Evar attempts to take Jim down with him by ramming his ship, but Silver's badly damaged ship arrives. He rams Evar's flagship, and both ships are destroyed.

The Procyons are forced into harsh peace terms thanks to their treachery, and the Empire is saved. Silver is presumed dead, and receives a posthumous pardon and knighthood, but Jim believes that Silver survived and is out there somewhere gathering a new fleet.

=== Skirmishes/Multiplayer ===
In the game, there are three separate factions: the Royal Navy, the Procyons and the Pirates. The Ironclads are included in the Procyon fleet list, which gives away the twist ending somewhat. In the skirmishes, depending on the map in question, the player either chooses a faction to play or has one chosen for them. AI players can be added, and can be made allies or enemies of the player or other AI.

In historical skirmishes, the fleets, crew, arms, factions and allies are chosen for the player based on the given scenario. In open-map skirmishes, it is possible to customise your fleet, such as changing the weapons built into the ships' weapon hardpoints, adding named crewmembers who improve performance in certain jobs based on their various statistics (areas of ship crew includes Captain, Gunnery, Navigation, Rigging and Spotter), and selecting different ships to serve in your fleet. Fleet permutations can be saved for reuse in future games. However, all this is limited by "Victory Points", which function as currency. In the single player campaign, Victory Points are won from completing missions, destroying enemy vessels, and picking up lifeboats which randomly appear when a ship is destroyed. In skirmish mode, Victory Points are set at a certain level to ensure competing AI fleets are of equal size. Although the limitations on Victory Points and fleet sizes can be altered by the player in open-map skirmishes, Victory Points are capped at 1000 and fleet sizes are capped at 10. These caps cannot be exceeded.

Multiplayer also uses the same historical and open maps as the single player skirmishes. These were originally played using either a LAN cable to connect two computers or via the Internet. Each player interchanged a unique code in order to play with each other, which ensured that a player only played against people they were familiar with and not someone they did not intend to play with. Although LAN play is still possible, Disney shut down the match-up server some years ago and Internet play was made impossible.

== Reception ==
Reception

Aggregate scores
Aggregator	Score
GameRankings	75.10%
Metacritic	73/100

Review scores
Publication	Score
Computer and Video Games	7/10
GameRevolution	C+
GameSpot	7/10
GameSpy	2.5/5
GameZone	8.3/10
IGN	8.5/10
PC Gamer (US)	67%

The game was met with positive to average reception upon release, as GameRankings gave it a score of 75.10%, while Metacritic gave it 73 out of 100.
