= Fort Zombie =

2009 video game

- Developer: Kerberos Productions
- Publisher: Paradox Interactive
- Platform: Microsoft Windows
- Release: October 30, 2009
- Genre: Role-playing
- Mode: Single-player

Fort Zombie is a role-playing video game developed by Kerberos Productions. It was released on October 30, 2009. The game takes place on a version of Earth that is being invaded by an evil force which warps reality and creates zombies. Players control Ben Riley, a young man who has survived through the destruction and is setting up a haven in the fictional town of Piety, Indiana. Each version of Piety in any play-through is procedurally generated, with different houses, items and enemies placed each time the player enters the town. Players must choose a location to fortify, build defenses and find supplies and survivors in thirteen in-game days before a zombie horde pours out of Indianapolis and overwhelms the survivors. The game began as a test for technology to be used in the upcoming game Northstar and uses a similar engine.
