= Homeworld 2 =

2003 video game

- Developer: Relic Entertainment (Note: Ported to Mac OS X by Beenox)
- Publisher: Sierra Entertainment (Note: Published by Aspyr for Mac OS X)
- Producers: Daniel Irish; Chris Mahnken
- Designer: Josh Mosqueira
- Programmers: Stéphane Morichère-Matte; Luke Moloney
- Artist: David T. Cheong
- Writers: Joshua Mosqueira; Mary DeMarle; Rob Cunningham
- Composer: Paul Ruskay
- Series: Homeworld
- Platforms: Windows, Mac OS X
- Release: September 16, 2003: Windows; NA: September 16, 2003; AU: September 18, 2003; EU: September 26, 2003 Mac OS X September 21, 2004 Remastered Windows February 25, 2015 OS X August 6, 2015
- Genre: Real-time strategy
- Modes: Single-player, multiplayer

Homeworld 2 is a 2003 real-time strategy video game sequel to Homeworld, developed by Relic Entertainment and published by Sierra Entertainment. Its story concerns Hiigara's response to a new enemy called the Vaygr. Its gameplay takes a new direction with the enhancement of its graphics and audio. In contrast to the closely equivalent Kushan and Taiidan forces of the original game, Vaygr and Hiigaran spaceships differ significantly in design and application.

== Gameplay ==
Homeworld 2 shares the movement system and three-dimensional play area of its predecessor. Units are moved three-dimensionally using a combination of mouse movements and key presses to modify the z-axis of the destination position.

Gameplay in Homeworld 2 depends on so-called "Resource Units" (RUs), which are collected by harvester craft. RUs are the currency for both ship creation and technology research, placing limits on what combination of shipbuilding and new technology research can be carried out in a single game.

The player's fleet is centered on the Mothership, the destruction of which results in an immediate Game Over in a single-player game and is a critical loss in a multiplayer game. The Mothership is capable of constructing all but the very largest ships, which must be built using Shipyards (the game states these are built at orbital facilities and arrive via hyperspace). The Mothership can also build Carriers, which themselves can build any ship from the Fighter, Corvette and Frigate families. Although the Mothership is initially the center of new research, Carriers and Shipyards can build their own on-board Research Labs.

All units in Homeworld 2 are starships of various classes, from small to large: Fighter, Corvette, Frigate and Capital Ship. Although the larger ships are more powerful and durable, they are also much slower and less maneuverable. Ships within each class specialize in certain areas and are vulnerable to certain other ships, although there may be ships in the same class that do not share the same vulnerability. Ion Cannon Frigates, for instance, are very vulnerable to fighters due to the unwieldy (albeit powerful) nature of their single weapon. Flak Frigates, however, are specifically intended for use against fighters, but lack the firepower to defend themselves against other frigates. Effective use of the relative strengths of each ship is essential for success.

Homeworld 2 allows players to co-opt enemy ships using specialized frigates, much like the original game. These maneuver close to enemy vessels and dispatch boarding parties, which capture the vessel after a short period of time; capture can be sped up by using multiple Frigates against the same target simultaneously. However, these frigates are completely exposed to attack during the boarding process, and all capturing progress is lost if they are destroyed.

Although Homeworld 2 nominally has no difficulty setting, it features dynamic difficulty adjustments, in which the strength of a level's opposition is determined using the composition of the fleet the player enters the level with (the fleet remaining at the end of the previous level). This led to an exploit in which players "retired" all of their ships at the end of the previous level, reducing them to RUs, and entering the next level with a huge store of raw materials to use against a very weak enemy. The game also codifies the support caps introduced in Homeworld, and explained in Homeworld: Cataclysm, by placing overall limits on how many ships of each class the player may control at once.

Mission objectives in the single-player game are primarily achieved by destroying key enemy elements, capturing particular targets, protecting certain units for a particular amount of time, or towing an object back to the Mothership. In addition to the storyline objectives, a significant portion of the missions require the destruction of all enemy units.

=== Multiplayer ===
Homeworld 2 can be played online with 5 other players.

== Plot ==
Homeworld 2 continues the struggle of the Hiigarans and their leader Karan S'jet. While in the original game the player could select either the Kushan or Taiidan races, in the sequel the Kushan are established as the canonical protagonists.

During the events of the original game (and played out in the prequel Deserts of Kharak), the Kushan race of the planet Kharak discovered the wreckage of the Khar-Toba, an interstellar transport starship, in the Great Desert. Inside, they found an ancient Hyperspace Core, and a galactic map etched on a piece of stone that showed that the Kushan had been transplanted to Kharak long ago, and pointed the way to their long-lost homeworld, Hiigara. The Kushan built an enormous self-sufficient Mothership, powered by the Hyperspace Core from the Khar-Toba, to carry 600,000 people across the galaxy to Hiigara. Throughout their journey, the Kushan battled the forces of the Taiidan Empire, which had exiled them, and endured numerous other hardships along the way. With the aid of the Bentusi, a powerful and enigmatic race of traders, the Kushan reached Hiigara and destroyed the Taiidan Emperor, laying claim to their homeworld.

The story continues that the Hyperspace Core found in the Khar-Toba was the second of only three known to exist in the galaxy, left behind by an ancient race known as the Progenitors. The First Core was possessed by the Bentusi; the third was lost until approximately one hundred years after the Exiles reclaimed Hiigara, found by a Vaygr Warlord named Makaan. With his massive Flagship empowered by the Third Core, Makaan began a campaign of conquest, seizing control of the remnants of the Taiidan Empire and surrounding star systems, and—as of the beginning of Homeworld 2—began attempts to capture Hiigara. The story states that religious beings of the galaxy consider the discovery of the Third Core to announce the End Times, during which Sajuuk, thought to be an immensely powerful being, will return. Makaan believes himself to be the Sajuuk-Khar, a messianic figure that will unite the Three Cores and herald the return of Sajuuk.

The game begins with the commissioning of a new Mothership, the Pride of Hiigara, at the Great Derelict at Tanis. The Pride of Hiigara is similar in shape and design to the original Mothership and commanded by Karan S'jet, as in the original game. The ship is attacked by the Vaygr during the final stages of construction, but escapes to rally the Hiigaran fleet. Makaan's fleet lays siege to Hiigara, and the Warlord offers a deal to the Hiigarans: if they surrender the Second Core to him, he will spare their Homeworld.

The Bentusi inform the Hiigarans that they must find Balcora Gate, left behind by the Progenitors, behind which is something essential for stopping either the Vaygr threat, the End Times, or both. The Hiigarans find a Progenitor Dreadnought in the wreckage of the old engineering section of the Old Progenitor Mothership, and find that it is required to unlock Balcora Gate. The Hiiigarans briefly engage with a Progenitor Keeper, an ancient AI controlled vessel impervious to almost all damage. The Great Harbor Ship of Bentus, last of the Bentusi, sacrifices itself after being ambushed by 4 Progenitor Keepers, leaving its Core for the Hiigarans to claim in order to stop Makaan. But the Warlord learns of the Balcora Gate as well, and the game's penultimate mission takes place on the other side, where Hiigarans and Vaygr alike discover that Sajuuk is in fact a Mothership-sized Progenitor starship, with sockets for the Three Hyperspace Cores.

The Hiigaran fleet engages Makaan's Flagship and destroys it, claiming the Third Core from the wreckage. With all three Cores, the Hiigarans reactivate Sajuuk, abandoning the Pride of Hiigara, and bring it back to Hiigara to break the Vaygr siege, destroying the Vaygr's planet-killer weapons and saving Hiigara from destruction. Sajuuk is later found to be the key to a galaxy-wide network of hyperspace gates, ushering in a new age of trade and prosperity for all civilized races in the galaxy - the Age of Karan S'jet, the true Sajuuk-Khar.

=== Characters ===
Like the original Homeworld, there are a handful of individual characters with a prominent place in the narrative:

- Karan S'jet: The main protagonist, the scientist who volunteered to become the living core of the Mothership during the original game, returns once again as Fleet Command on the Pride of Hiigara to lead the Hiigaran fleet against the Vaygr. She is voiced by Jennifer Dawne Graveness, taking over for Heidi Ernest (the original voice of Fleet Command in the first game and in the training missions for Cataclysm). In 2015, it was revealed at PAX South that the voice change was due to personal circumstances that left Ernest unable to reprise her role as Fleet Command, though she returned to the role for the Remastered Collection.
- Fleet Intelligence: Much like in the original game, Fleet Intelligence is a male character who analyzes sensor data and generates mission objectives during the single-player campaign; also like in the original game, he is not heard in multiplayer. He is voiced by Eli Gabay in the original release. Michael Sunczyk, the voice of Fleet Intelligence in the first game, returned to the role for the Remastered Edition in 2015.
- Captain Soban: Commander of the Ferin Sha fleet that aids in the defense of the Pride of Hiigara during a Vaygr attack.
- Captain Elohim: Commander of a Kiith Nabaal shipyard that eventually joins the Mothership fleet.
- Makaan: The main antagonist, Makaan is a warlord of the Vaygr and ruler of an interstellar domain that includes the remnants of the Taiidan Empire. He believes himself to be the Sajuuk-khar, the Chosen One who will unite the Three Cores and bring about the return of Sajuuk. Unlike the Taiidan Emperor in the original Homeworld, Makaan is a battle-hardened warlord and brilliant strategist. He is voiced by Mark Oliver.

== Development ==
Homeworld 2 uses a proprietary scripting language, known as SCAR (SCripting At Relic) in addition to others. The SCAR language was created for the express purpose of coding in Homeworld 2 and deals mainly with events in the single-player campaign (zooming out with the camera, creating enemy ships, moving the player to the next level, etc.). Homeworld 2 also makes use of version 4.0 of the Lua programming language. Homeworld 2 uses Lua for in-game levels, formatted as .level files, AI, and as a Rules Engine for game logic. The developer sets many variables inside a Homeworld 2 game, including ambient light, background, placement of start positions and asteroids, among many other things.

The soundtrack of Homeworld 2 was created by Paul Ruskay, like the former parts of the series.

== Reception ==
Reception

Aggregate scores
Aggregator	Score
GameRankings	85%
Metacritic	83/100

Homeworld 2 received a score of 85% at GameRankings, and 83/100 at Metacritic. It also received a 9 out of 10 from IGN. GameSpot named it the best computer game of September 2003.

The scenery background graphics were particularly well-received.

During the 7th Annual Interactive Achievement Awards, the Academy of Interactive Arts & Sciences nominated Homeworld 2 for "Computer Strategy Game of the Year".

== Legacy ==
=== Intellectual property history ===
In August 2004, approximately a year after the release of Homeworld 2, Relic Studios was purchased by THQ for approximately US$10 million. As THQ was considered to be a competitor of Sierra Entertainment and Vivendi Universal, the prospect of a Homeworld sequel remained unlikely as Sierra was still the owner of the Homeworld Intellectual Property (IP) until September 2007 when it was announced that THQ was in talks with Vivendi to purchase the license Homeworld franchise. In November 2007, THQ finally confirmed that it had acquired the license for the Homeworld franchise but didn't confirm a sequel maintaining that it had no comments on future games from THQ based on Homeworld. However, Eurogamer reported in November 2008 that Relic was "definitely looking" at creating Homeworld 3. "Warhammer 40,000: Dawn of War II" lead designer Jonny Ebbert commented that "We're really happy the IP has made its way home, and yeah, we're definitely looking at it. We'll see what happens in the future,". Ebbert also commented that there was always a chance that the sequel could be in development behind closed doors. The strongest evidence indicating that Homeworld 3 is in development came from Relic's General Manager, Tarnie Williams indicating that "three or four" titles were in development while declining to elaborate further. In 2011 Relic confirmed that they would "like to develop Homeworld 3" but they did not confirm or deny working on it. In early 2013 THQ suffered financial difficulties and liquidated their assets due to bankruptcy; Relic was sold off to SEGA. The Homeworld IP was not part of this sale. Despite early speculation that SEGA would attempt to rescue the IP, ultimately the Homeworld IP was sold to Gearbox Software. Gearbox announced that their initial plans would be to bring the existing Homeworld games to multiple digital sales platforms, but also created a forum on their website specifically asking for fan ideas about how the series should proceed. Blackbird Interactive, a newer developer made up of many of the designers of the original Homeworld, later offered their support of Gearbox's purchase of the IP.

=== Prequel ===
In 2013, Blackbird Interactive announced the creation of a game titled Shipbreakers. Originally, the game developers focused on a game that carried the "essence" of Homeworld, but not directly related. However, Gearbox made an arrangement with Blackbird to re-brand Shipbreakers into Homeworld: Shipbreakers; officially tying the game as part of the Homeworld universe. The game is a prequel to the Homeworld series. In December 2015 the title was revealed to be Homeworld: Deserts of Kharak. It was released on January 20, 2016.

=== Remake ===
On July 19, 2013, Gearbox announced the release of Homeworld HD and Homeworld 2 HD remakes, along with the original versions of the games, for 2014. In March 2014 Homeworld HD was renamed to Homeworld Remastered Collection. After missing the original deadline in 2014, Homeworld Remastered Collection was released on February 25, 2015. The collection includes the original (with LAN multiplayer gaming removed) and remastered versions of Homeworld and Homeworld 2. The Remastered versions are both built on the Homeworld 2 engine and have high resolution textures and models, new graphical effects, recreated cinematic scenes, and support for HD, Ultra HD and 4K resolutions. Multiplayer for both games has been combined into one centralised mode. The Homeworld Remastered Collection was released on February 25, 2015. Aspyr Media released the Homeworld Remastered Collection for OSX via the Mac App store on August 6, 2015.

=== Sequel ===
Following successful planning and support, publisher Gearbox produced Homeworld 3, a sequel to the original series of games. Development of the game was partially funded through the crowdfunding platform Fig in late 2019. The game was developed by Blackbird Interactive and released on May 13, 2024.
