= Kerberos Productions =

Canadian video game developer

- Type: Private
- Industry: Video games
- Founded: 2003; 23 years ago
- Headquarters: Vancouver, British Columbia; V6H 1C7
- Products: Sword of the Stars; Fort Zombie

Kerberos Productions Inc. is a video game developer based in Vancouver, British Columbia, Canada. The company was formed in 2003 by former employees of Rockstar Vancouver.

The company takes its name and logo from Cerberus, a large three-headed creature of Greek mythology (Κέρβερος, in Greek). The three heads of the hellhound represent the three disciplines of game development: art, programming, and design.

The company has released 12 games in a handful of genre, most of them set in the same shared narrative world as their first game, a 4X game called Sword of the Stars and its sequel Sword of the Stars 2. Additional titles include a role-playing video game titled Fort Zombie, a rogue-like game Sword of the Stars: The Pit, a wargame called Ground Pounders, an action-strategy game Kaiju-a-Gogo, a hybrid FPS/rogue-like The Pit: Infinity, two PC boardgames; Hoards of Glory and Planetary Control!, and two actual boardgames; Sword of the Stars: Planetary Control! and The Pit: The Boardgame.

Sword of the Stars was originally published by Lighthouse Interactive, which later folded. The 4X series was picked up and published by Paradox Interactive. All other Kerberos titles have been self-published.

== Games ==
- Sword of the Stars (2006)
  - Sword of the Stars: Born of Blood (2007) (expansion)
  - Sword of the Stars: A Murder of Crows (2008) (expansion)
  - Sword of the Stars: Argos Naval Yard (2009) (expansion)
- Fort Zombie (2009)
- Sword of the Stars II: The Lords of Winter (2011)
- Sword of the Stars: The Pit (2013)
- Ground Pounders (2014)
- Kaiju-a-Gogo (2015)
  - Kaiju-a-Gogo: Grey Goop (2019) (expansion)
- The Pit: Infinity (2019)
- The Pit: The Boardgame (2020) (boardgame)
- Sword of the Stars: Planetary Control! (2020) (boardgame)
- Hoards of Glory (2020)
- Planetary Control! (2021)
- Sword of the Stars: The Pit 2 (2021) (early access)
- Hoards of Glory (TBA) (boardgame)
- NorthStar (TBA)
