= Rockstar Vancouver =

Canadian video game developer

Rockstar Vancouver Inc.
- Formerly: Barking Dog Studios Ltd. (1998–2002)
- Type: Subsidiary
- Industry: Video games
- Founded: May 1998; 28 years ago
- Founders: Glenn Barnes; Peter Grant; Michael Gyori; Christopher Mair; Brian Thalken; Sean Thompson
- Defunct: 9 July 2012
- Fate: Merged into Rockstar Toronto
- Headquarters: Vancouver, Canada
- Products: Bully
- Number of employees: 35 (2012)
- Parent: Rockstar Games (2002–2012)

Rockstar Vancouver Inc. (formerly Barking Dog Studios Ltd.) was a Canadian video game developer and a studio of Rockstar Games based in Vancouver. The studio is best known for developing Bully (2006).

Six former Radical Entertainment developers—Glenn Barnes, Peter Grant, Michael Gyori, Christopher Mair, Brian Thalken, and Sean Thompson—founded the company as Barking Dog Studios in May 1998. In its early years, Barking Dog briefly assisted Relic Entertainment with Homeworld (1999) before being greenlit to develop an expansion pack, Homeworld: Cataclysm (2000). The studio also developed Counter-Strike's "Beta 5" update (1999), Global Operations (2002), and Treasure Planet: Battle at Procyon (2002). Take-Two Interactive acquired Barking Dog in August 2002 and integrated it with Rockstar Games as Rockstar Vancouver. The studio then developed Bully and was one of the Rockstar Games studios leading the development of Max Payne 3 (2012). In July 2012, Rockstar Games merged Rockstar Vancouver into Rockstar Toronto, with Rockstar Vancouver's 35 employees being given the option to relocate to Rockstar Toronto or any other Rockstar Games studio.

== History ==
=== Early years (1998–2002) ===
Barking Dog Studios's logo, designed by Sean Thompson, was mostly unchanged during the name's lifespan and was the motif for a neon sign in the company's reception area.

Rockstar Vancouver was founded as Barking Dog Studios by Glenn Barnes, Peter Grant, Michael Gyori, Christopher Mair, Brian Thalken, and Sean Thompson. They had worked at the developer Radical Entertainment until the company faced financial difficulties in the late 1990s. As the studio's partnership with Disney had faltered, it lost its ESPN licence and was briefly in receivership. This prompted the formation of multiple companies by employees who left Radical Entertainment, including Black Box Games. The sextet established Barking Dog in May 1998. They sought a "non-corporate, non-pretentious" name during a brainstorming session and settled on one derived from the Barking Dog, a pub in California. The company formally began operating on 16 July 1998 after signing its first publishing contract.

The nascent studio worked with the developer Relic Entertainment and the publisher Sierra Studios on programming for the 1999 game Homeworld. Shortly thereafter, it was greenlit to develop an expansion pack, Homeworld: Cataclysm. During this time, Barking Dog moved into Relic Entertainment's offices and had roughly 20 employees engaged in the game's development. Cataclysm was announced in February 2000 and released in September. When an updated version was released via the GOG.com platform in June 2017, its name was changed to Homeworld: Emergence because Blizzard Entertainment had since registered the "Cataclysm" trademark for World of Warcraft: Cataclysm.

Around 1999, Valve became interested in Counter-Strike, a mod co-created by the Barking Dog employee Minh Le. As it became more involved in the project, the company hired Barking Dog for the mod's "Beta 5" update. The studio developed roughly 90% of that update, which was released in December 1999. Le joined Valve shortly thereafter to continue Counter-Strike's development, and the finished game was released in November 2000. In the same month, Barking Dog was rumoured to be developing a tactical first-person shooter, which Crave Entertainment announced as Global Operations in December of that year. Global Operations was released in March 2002, co-published by Crave Entertainment and Electronic Arts.

Around this time, Barking Dog was developing Transworld Skateboarding for Infogrames, one of three sports video games the publisher produced in collaboration with the magazine of the same name. Despite being at an early development stage in June 2001, it was scheduled for release on the Xbox in early 2002. In the same month, the studio commenced work on a real-time strategy game using ARES, the proprietary game engine it had been working on since January of that year. Disney Interactive, Disney's games division, announced the game as Treasure Planet: Battle at Procyon, a tie-in with the film Treasure Planet, and released it in November 2002.

=== Acquisition and Bully (2002–2007) ===
On 1 August 2002, Take-Two Interactive announced its acquisition of Barking Dog for US$3 million in cash and 242,450 shares of restricted common stock, an estimated $9 million total value. Barking Dog was integrated with Take-Two's Rockstar Games label as Rockstar Vancouver. Rockstar Canada, Rockstar Games's studio in Oakville, Ontario, was renamed Rockstar Toronto to avoid confusion between the two. Jamie Leece, the president of Take-Two's Gotham Games label, assisted in the acquisition. At the time, the studio and its roughly 50 employees were working with Rockstar Games on two games: a military action game and an original title. In the time following the acquisition, several Rockstar Vancouver employees (including some of its founders) set up new studios, including Ironclad Games (2003), Kerberos Productions (2004), Slant Six Games (2005), Big Sandwich Games (2006), Hellbent Games (2006), and United Front Games (2007).

Under Rockstar Games, Rockstar Vancouver worked on Spec Ops, a reboot of the eponymous series. With music by Josh Homme and Alain Johannes of the band Queens of the Stone Age, the game was to be released in late 2005 but it was cancelled that year. The studio's first released game was announced as Bully in May 2005. Before its release, the game's name and theme attracted some controversy from politicians, parents, and activists like Jack Thompson, who regarded it as advocating school violence. In Europe, it was renamed Canis Canem Edit. Upon its 2006 release, the game garnered a positive critical response, and PC Gamer's Sam Roberts labelled it Rockstar Games's "softest and silliest game, with the warmest heart" in a 2014 retrospective.

=== Max Payne 3 and closure (2008–2012) ===
In October 2008, Rockstar Vancouver was rumoured to be developing a third entry in the Max Payne series created by Remedy Entertainment. Rockstar Games announced Max Payne 3 in March 2009, expecting to release it later that year. According to Dan Houser, the creative director, a new Max Payne game was chosen over a Bully sequel due to having what he described as "limited bandwidth and limited studios, and more games to make than we've started". The development became a cooperation between Rockstar Vancouver, Rockstar Toronto, Rockstar London, and Rockstar New England. In a January 2010 open letter, the wives of several Rockstar San Diego employees claimed that their spouses had regularly worked overtime and that the studio was suffering from mismanagement. These claims were echoed by former employees of other Rockstar Games studios, including Rockstar Vancouver. The mismanagement was said to have caused Max Payne 3 to miss its intended release window, being rescheduled for August–October 2010. It was eventually released in May 2012.

Two months later, on 9 July 2012, Rockstar Games announced that Rockstar Toronto would be moving into larger, custom-built offices in Oakville, into which Rockstar Vancouver would be merged. Rockstar Vancouver's 35 employees were given the option to relocate to the expanded Rockstar Toronto or any other Rockstar Games studio. Jennifer Kolbe, Rockstar Games's vice-president of publishing and operations, stated creating a single Canadian team would "make for a powerful creative force on future projects", while making room for 50 new positions at Rockstar Toronto. Rockstar Vancouver's legal entity, Rockstar Vancouver Inc., remained registered under Canada's federal company laws. In November 2012, it became a British Columbia corporation as Rockstar Games Vancouver Inc. and then an unlimited liability corporation as Rockstar Games Vancouver ULC. In August 2019, it was renamed Take-Two Interactive Software Vancouver ULC.

== Games developed ==
=== As Barking Dog Studios ===
List of games developed by Rockstar Vancouver, 2000–2002
| Year | Title | Platform(s) | Publisher(s) | Notes |
|---|---|---|---|---|
| 2000 | Homeworld: Cataclysm | Windows | Sierra Studios | |
| 2000 | Counter-Strike | Linux, macOS, Windows, Xbox | Sierra Studios | Developed the "Beta 5" update (1999) |
| 2002 | Global Operations | Windows | Crave Entertainment, Electronic Arts | |
| 2002 | Treasure Planet: Battle at Procyon | Windows | Disney Interactive | |

=== As Rockstar Vancouver ===
List of games developed by Rockstar Vancouver, 2006–2012
| Year | Title | Platform(s) | Publisher(s) | Notes |
|---|---|---|---|---|
| 2006 | Bully | Android, iOS, PlayStation 2, Wii, Windows, Xbox 360 | Rockstar Games | |
| 2012 | Max Payne 3 | macOS, PlayStation 3, Windows, Xbox 360 | Rockstar Games | Developed as part of Rockstar Studios |

=== Cancelled ===
- Transworld Skateboarding
- Spec Ops
