= Homeworld =

1999 real-time strategy computer game

- Developer: Relic Entertainment
- Publisher: Sierra Studios
- Director: Alex Garden
- Designer: Erin Daly
- Programmer: Luke Moloney
- Artists: Rob Cunningham; Aaron Kambeitz
- Writers: Martin Cirulis; Arinn Dembo; David J. Williams
- Composer: Paul Ruskay
- Series: Homeworld
- Platforms: Windows, OS X
- Release: Original; September 28, 1999 (Windows); Remaster; February 25, 2015 (Windows); August 6, 2015 (OS X)
- Genre: Real-time strategy
- Modes: Single-player, multiplayer

Homeworld is a real-time strategy video game developed by Relic Entertainment and published by Sierra Studios on September 28, 1999, for Windows. Set in space, the science fiction game follows the Kushan exiles of the planet Kharak after their home planet is destroyed by the Taiidan Empire in retaliation for developing hyperspace jump technology. The survivors journey with their spacecraft-constructing mothership to reclaim their ancient homeworld of Hiigara from the Taiidan, encountering a variety of pirates, mercenaries, traders, and rebels along the way. In each of the game's levels, the player gathers resources, builds a fleet, and uses it to destroy enemy ships and accomplish mission objectives. The player's fleet carries over between levels and can travel in a fully three-dimensional space within each level rather than being limited to a two-dimensional plane.

Homeworld was created over two years, and was the first game developed by Relic. Studio co-founders Alex Garden and Luke Moloney served as the director and lead programmer. The initial concept for the story is credited to writer David J. Williams, while the script itself was written by Martin Cirulis and the background lore was written by author Arinn Dembo. The music was written by composer Paul Ruskay as the first game from his Studio X Labs, with the exceptions of Samuel Barber's 1936 Adagio for Strings, considered the defining theme of the game, and a licensed track from English rock band Yes, "Homeworld (The Ladder)".

Homeworld is listed by review aggregator Metacritic as the highest-rated computer game of 1999, and the third-highest on any platform for the year. Critics praised the graphics, unique gameplay elements, and multiplayer system, though opinions were divided on the plot and high difficulty. The game sold over 500,000 copies in its first six months, and received several awards and nominations for best strategy game of the year and best game of the year. A release of the source code in 2003 sparked unofficial ports to Mac OS X and Linux, and four more games in the Homeworld series have been produced: Homeworld: Cataclysm (2000), Homeworld 2 (2003), Homeworld: Deserts of Kharak (2016), and Homeworld 3 (2024). Gearbox Software purchased the rights to the series from then-owners THQ in 2013, and released a remastered collection of Homeworld and Homeworld 2 in 2015 for Windows and OS X which was also highly regarded.

== Gameplay ==
Homeworld is a real-time strategy game set in space. Gameplay, as in most real-time strategy games, is focused on gathering resources, building military forces, and using them to destroy enemy forces and accomplish an objective. The game includes both single-player and multiplayer modes; the single-player mode consists of one story-driven campaign, broken up into levels. In each level, the player has an objective to accomplish before they can end the level, though the ultimate objective of the mission can change as the level's story unfolds. Between each of the 16 levels is a hand-drawn, black-and-white cutscene with narrative voiceovers.

An in-game screenshot from the original version of the game depicting a battle near the mothership. The mothership is being attacked by beam and missile weapons, and is on fire. The game's user interface is hidden, as is usual during gameplay unless the player has pressed an interface option key.

The central ship of the player's fleet is the mothership, a large base which can construct other ships; unlike other spacecraft, in the single-player campaign the mothership is unable to move. Present in each level are stationary rocks, gas clouds, or dust clouds, which can be mined by specialized harvesting ships (resource collectors) which then empty their loads at the mothership in the form of "resources", the game's only currency. Resources can be spent by the player on building new ships, which are constructed by the mothership. Buildable ships come in a variety of types, which are discovered over the course of the game. They include resource collectors, fighters and corvettes, frigates, destroyers, and heavy cruisers, as well as specialized non-combat ships such as research vessels and repair corvettes. Fighter ships need to dock with support ships or return to the mothership periodically to refuel, while salvage corvettes can capture enemy ships and tow them to the mothership to become part of the player's fleet. In some levels, new ship types can be unlocked by capturing an enemy ship of that type, through research performed at the research vessel, or through plot elements. At the beginning of the campaign, the player may select between controlling the "Kushan" or "Taiidan" fleet; this affects the designs of the ships and changes some of the specialized ship options, but has no effect on the plot or gameplay.

Each level's playable area is a sphere, bisected by a circular plane. Ships can be directed to move anywhere in that sphere, either singularly or in groups. The game's camera can be set to follow any ship and view them from any angle, as well as display the ship's point of view. The player may also view the "Sensors Manager", wherein they can view the entire game map along with all visible ships. Ships can be grouped into formations, such as wedges or spheres, in order to provide tactical advantages during combat with enemy ships. Non-specialized ships are equipped with weapons to fire upon enemy ships, which include ballistic guns, beam weapons, and missiles. As a ship is damaged by weapons its health bar depletes, visual effects such as fire and smoke are added, and it can eventually explode.

When all mission objectives are completed, the player is given the option to make a hyperspace jump to end the level. This may be postponed in order to gather more resources or build more ships. When the hyperspace jump is initiated, all fighters and corvettes return to the mothership while larger ships line up next to it, and blue rectangles, or hyperspace gates, pass over the ships, and all ships are brought to the next level. The player retains their fleet between levels, and the difficulty of each mission is adjusted to a small extent based on how many ships are in the player's fleet at the beginning of each level. In multiplayer games, the objective is typically to destroy the enemy mothership(s) and any carriers, though other battle-oriented victory conditions are available. In multiplayer mode, the mothership is capable of slow movement, and all research options permitted by the map are available via a technology tree, rather than dependent on a plot point. Multiple maps are available, as are options to turn off the need to research technologies or fuel consumption for smaller ships.

== Plot ==
The final hand-drawn cutscene of Homeworld, showing Karan S'jet as the last person from the fleet to set foot on Hiigara

A century prior to the start of the game, the Kushan, humanoid inhabitants of the desert planet Kharak, discovered a spaceship buried in the sands, which holds a stone map marking Kharak and another planet across the galaxy labelled "Hiigara", meaning "home". The discovery united the clans of Kharak, who had previously determined that they were not indigenous to the planet. Together, they spent the next century developing and building a giant mothership that would carry 600,000 people to Hiigara, with neuroscientist Karan S'jet neurally wired into the ship as Fleet Command to replace an unsustainably large crew. The game opens with the maiden voyage of the mothership, testing the hyperspace drive which brings the fleet to a new destination by faster than light travel. Instead of the support ship that was expected to be there, the mothership finds a hostile alien carrier. After driving them off, the mothership returns to Kharak, to discover that the planet has been razed by another alien fleet, and that only the 600,000 migrants in suspended animation have survived. A captured enemy captain claims that the Kharak genocide was the consequence of their violation of a 4,000-year-old treaty between the interstellar Taiidan Empire and the Kushan, which forbade the latter from developing hyperspace technology.

After destroying the remnants of both alien fleets, the nascent Kushan fleet sets out for Hiigara, intent on reclaiming their ancient homeworld. Their multi-stage journey across the galaxy takes them through asteroid fields, a giant nebula, a ship graveyard and several imperial outposts. Along the way, they fight other descendants of their Hiigaran ancestors who have started worshiping a nebula which conceals them as a holy place, and who do not allow outsiders to leave due to fear of discovery. They also meet the Bentusi, a race of traders, who sell them advanced technology. After discovering that the Bentusi have given aid to the exiles, the empire attempts to destroy them, but are stopped by the Kushan fleet. The Bentusi then reveal that the Kushan had once ruled their own empire, before being destroyed by the Taiidan, and were exiled from Hiigara. In gratitude for the Kushan's intervention, they promise to summon the Galactic Council to recognize their claim to Hiigara.

As their journey continues, the Kushan fleet gives sanctuary to the rebel imperial captain Elson, who informs them that the destruction of Kharak has sparked a civil war in the Taiidan Empire. After helping him access a rebel communication network, he provides information on the defenses around Hiigara. In a final battle above Hiigara, he arrives with a rebel fleet to help fight the Imperial fleet led by the emperor himself. The emperor manages to knock Karan into a coma via her neural connection with the mothership, but the combined Kushan and rebel fleets defeat the emperor regardless. The Galactic Council arrives shortly thereafter and confirms the Kushan's claim to Hiigara, a lush world in contrast to the desert planet of Kharak. When the Kushan make landfall, Karan insists that she be the last one to set foot on the planet.

== Development ==
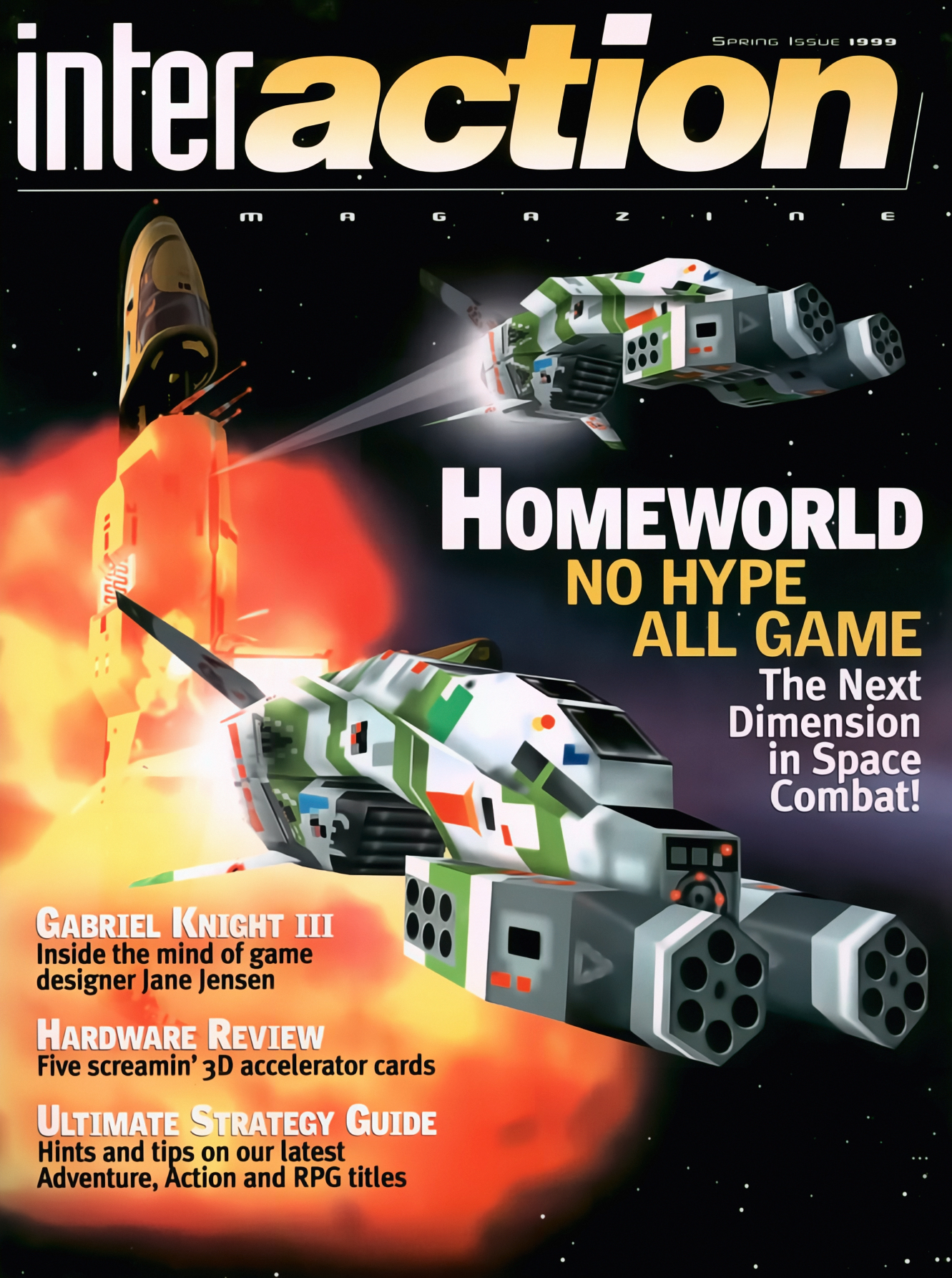
Homeworld on the cover of Interaction, the magazine of publisher Sierra Studios

Relic Entertainment was founded in Vancouver, Canada, on June 1, 1997, and began work on Homeworld as its first game. Relic co-founders Alex Garden and Luke Moloney served as the director and lead programmer, respectively, while Erin Daly was the designer and Aaron Kambeitz the lead artist. Garden was 22 years old when he founded the company. Writer David J. Williams is credited with the original story concept, while the script itself was written by Martin Cirulis and the background lore was written by author Arinn Dembo. Cirulis and Dembo, credited jointly as "Marcus Skyler", were selected by the publisher, Sierra Studios, partway through development to expand the story concept of Relic and Williams. Sierra agreed to publish the game early in development based on, according to Garden, "two whiteboard presentations and no demo". Development of the game took over two years; the gameplay systems were largely complete by the final eight months, which Relic spent polishing and improving the game, including adding the whole-map Sensors Manager view. In a February 1999 interview, Garden said the testers had found it much harder to play than it was for the developers, leading to the addition of features like short briefings at the beginning of levels to explain new concepts. The game was initially expected to be released at the end of 1998; Garden stated in a 1999 interview that the team found creating the core game itself much easier than getting it to the quality level they wanted, and that if they had known how difficult it was going to be they may have chosen not to do the project. He said that Sierra did not put much pressure on the studio to release the game before it was ready, and that Relic felt much more pressure from impatient fans. Several ideas, including ship customization, convoy routes, and different unit types for the Kushan and Taiidan fleets were cut as they could not be done well enough for the project.

Relic did not specifically set out to create a real-time strategy game; Garden and Relic were primarily focused on making a game with exciting large-scale space battles, and chose the genre in order to support that. As a result, they did not try to make innovative gameplay changes in the real-time strategy genre, but instead worked on making implementing the genre in a fully 3D space to make the space battles they envisioned. Garden told Computer Games Magazine in 1998 that "there's no sort of design philosophy behind it. The fact that it's real-time strategy was almost a fluke." The original Star Wars film trilogy was one of the primary inspirations, along with the 1970s television series Battlestar Galactica: in a 1998 interview with PC Zone, Garden stated that his original concept was "a 3D game that looked like you were watching Star Wars but had a storyline like Battlestar Galactica". He drew further inspiration from correcting what he felt were the limitations of the first-person space flight game Star Wars: X-Wing vs. TIE Fighter. He felt that having the player control a ship from a cockpit view detracted from the feeling of the overall battles, and so chose to have the player control a whole fleet from an external view. According to art director Rob Cunningham, the visual design was inspired by the sci-fi art of Peter Elson, Chris Foss, and John Harris, as well by Star Wars movies and Masamune Shirow. The vertical design of the mothership and the horizontal galaxy in the background were intended to give the player a visual alignment to orient themselves in 3D space.

The focus on the combat drove several other areas of focus for the development team: according to Garden, Relic spent considerable effort on making high-quality ship models, computer-controlled flight tactics, and maneuvers like Immelmann turns because "everyone is going to zoom right in on the first battle, just to watch". They felt that the advanced unit-level maneuvers in the context of large fleet-wide battles would increase immersion for players, and create a "Star Wars feeling" to the battles. To accentuate this, instead of recording stock sound files for units to use when maneuvering, the team instead recorded several thousand smaller clips which are combined to describe exactly which ships were taking which action, and are then modified by the audio engine to reflect the position and motion of the ships relative to the player's camera. The working title for the game was Spaghetti Ball, chosen for Garden's early vision of the battles as a mass of tangled flight paths as ships maneuvered around each other, contained within a larger sphere of available space. Although early previews expressed concern about the difficulties of controlling so many ships in 3D space, according to Garden the team felt that moving the camera and controlling the fleet were two wholly separate actions, and by treating them as such it made designing them and using them much simpler.

The sound design, audio production, and music were contracted to composer Paul Ruskay and Studio X Labs, which he founded in February 1999 after starting on Homeworld in October 1998. In addition to his original music compositions, Ruskay used a recording of the 1936 piece for string orchestra by Samuel Barber, Adagio for Strings, in an early scene in which the player finds the destruction of Kharak. The piece, in turn, became a central theme on the soundtrack. Adagio for Strings was proposed by Garden, who heard it on the radio and felt it fit the mood of the game "perfectly"; Ruskay had a new recording of the piece made by a University of California choir, as the license fees for the recording Garden heard were too high for the studio. The closing song, "Homeworld (The Ladder)", was composed for the game by the English rock band Yes. Yes were in Vancouver at the time recording The Ladder, and learned of the in-development Homeworld. Lead singer Jon Anderson was interested in writing something based on a video game, and wrote the lyrics to fit. The soundtrack was released in a 13-track album that was bundled with the Game of the Year Edition of Homeworld in May 2000, and again in a 37-track Homeworld Remastered Original Soundtrack digital album alongside the Homeworld Remastered Collection in March 2015.

== Reception ==
Reception

Aggregate score
| Aggregator | Score |
|---|---|
| Metacritic | 93 / 100 (20 reviews) |

Review scores
| Publication | Score |
|---|---|
| Computer Games Magazine | 4.5 / 5 |
| Computer Gaming World | 4.5 / 5 |
| Eurogamer | 9 / 10 |
| GamePro | 4.5 / 5 |
| GameSpot | 9 / 10 |
| GameSpy | 93 / 100 |
| IGN | 9.5 / 10 |

Homeworld was highly regarded by critics upon release and is listed by review aggregator Metacritic as the highest-rated computer game of 1999 and the third-highest on any platform for the year. The graphics were highly praised; Michael Ryan of GameSpot wrote it had "some of the most impressive graphics ever", while Jason Levine of Computer Games Magazine said that "no game—ever—has made space itself look like this". Eurogamer's review praised the "big, brash and colourful" backgrounds, which was echoed by Levine and John Keefer of GameSpy. Multiple reviewers, such as Vincent Lopez of IGN, also praised the detail and variety of the spaceships, and Jason Samuel of GamePro noted that Relic was able to use their graphics engine to create the intricate cutscenes rather than relying on prerecorded videos. Greg Fortune of Computer Gaming World added that the rotatable camera was one of the "real joys of the game", allowing the player to view the action from any angle or ship's viewpoint and "creating an impressively sweeping cinematic feel". The sound and music were also lauded; Levine wrote that the sound was "on par with the graphics", praising how it changed when the player zoomed into or away from a battle, while Eurogamer and Lopez applauded the "atmospheric" soundtrack for creating the mood.

The gameplay advances were also highly praised by critics: Lopez wrote that "Relic not only tackled space, but may have just changed strategy games forever." Reviewers praised the full 3D nature of the game as elevating it from its otherwise standard real-time strategy gameplay systems; Levine said that the 3D was what made the game unique, and Ryan explicitly termed the base gameplay as "fairly similar to any tried-and-true real-time strategy game" but said that the 3D elements and connected mission structure turned it into a "different breed" of game. Fortune, however, focused instead on the difficulty of the missions themselves, praising the challenge and variety of tactics needed to complete the game and lauding it for having "some of the best fleet battles ever seen in a computer game". Levine, Ryan, Keefer, and Lopez all noted the connected mission structure as an innovation in the genre: by limiting the resources to build ships and pulling the same fleet through the missions, Homeworld converted what would usually be a set of disconnected missions into "chapters" of a continuous game. They felt this connected the player to their fleet as more than disposable units, and added a level of strategy. Keefer and Levine did note, however, that this added a great deal of difficulty, especially for more casual players, as the player could make decisions in earlier levels that rendered later ones very difficult to complete without an explicit difficulty level to counteract it. Ryan and Keefer also considered the 3D movement disorienting at first, though Levine and Samuel said the controls were "as easy as possible".

Homeworld's single-player plot received more mixed reviews; Lopez wrote it would keep players "rapt with attention", Samuel summarized it as a "superb story", and Levine said that it was "the first computer game to capture the grandeur and epic feel of the Star Wars movies". The Eurogamer review, however, considered it only "(mostly) engaging", and Keefer said that "although the story line is fluid and intriguing", for each mission "the overall theme is the same: Kill the enemy", while Ryan described a "meager single-player game". The multiplayer gameplay was praised, especially against human opponents: Levine stated that "multiplayer in Homeworld is a joy", while the Eurogamer review called it the strongest part. The Eurogamer review, along with Samuel, also called the multiplayer mode more difficult and engaging than the single-player game.

== Legacy ==
Homeworld was released to strong sales and won multiple awards; it sold more than 250,000 copies in its initial weeks, and over 500,000 in its first six months. In the United States alone, sales surpassed 95,000 copies by the end of 1999, while sales in Germany reached 60,000 units by April 2000. It debuted in third place on Germany's computer game sales rankings for October 1999, before dropping to 25th, 31st and 32nd in the following three months, respectively. Homeworld also received a "Silver" sales award from the Entertainment and Leisure Software Publishers Association (ELSPA), indicating sales of at least 100,000 copies in the United Kingdom.

Homeworld won Best Strategy Game at the 1999 Game Critics Awards prior to release, and was nominated for "Computer Game of the Year" and "Computer Strategy Game of the Year" at the Academy of Interactive Arts & Sciences' 3rd Annual Interactive Achievement Awards. It was awarded Game of the Year by IGN and PC Gamer, won Strategy Game of the Year by Computer Gaming World and was nominated for the same by Computer Games Magazine, and won Best Original Storyline and Best Original Score at the 2000 Eurogamer Gaming Globes awards. It also won PC Gamer's "Special Achievement in Music" and "Special Achievement in Art Direction" prizes. Maximum PC wrote in 2003 that Homeworld "did what no game had successfully done before: create a truly three-dimensional space-combat strategy game". HardwareMAG called it "revolutionary" and "ground-breaking" in the real-time strategy genre in 2004, as did Computer Gaming World in 2003.

Homeworld inspired a series of real-time strategy games in the same universe, beginning in September 2000 when Sierra Studios released a stand-alone expansion by Barking Dog Studios, Homeworld: Cataclysm. Taking place 15 years after the events of Homeworld, the story centers on Kiith Somtaaw—a Hiigaran clan—and its struggles to protect Hiigara from a parasitic entity known as the Beast. A full sequel, Homeworld 2, was developed by Relic Entertainment and released by Sierra in late 2003. The game, set a century after the original Homeworld, pits the Hiigarans against a powerful, nomadic raider race called the Vaygr. A fourth game in the series, Homeworld: Deserts of Kharak, was developed by Blackbird Interactive and published by Gearbox Software in 2016. A prequel to the series, it is set on the planet of Kharak instead of in space, and features a war between Kushan clans during the discovery of the buried spaceship from Homeworld. Gearbox announced the fifth game in the series, Homeworld 3, on August 30, 2019. Developed by Blackbird, it was partially crowdfunded through Fig, and was released on May 13, 2024. Additionally, in 2003 Relic released the source code for Homeworld under license to members of the Relic Developer Network. The source code became the base of several source ports to alternative platforms, such as Linux. Several spinoff games have additionally been created in the Homeworld series, including a pinball table DLC for Pinball FX by Zen Studios in August 2022, a tabletop role-playing game named Homeworld Revelations by Modiphius Entertainment in September 2022, and Homeworld Mobile, a free-to-play massively multiplayer online real-time strategy game for iOS and Android by Stratosphere Games in October 2022.

== Remaster ==
Reception

Aggregate score
| Aggregator | Score |
|---|---|
| Metacritic | 86 / 100 (49 reviews) |

Review scores
| Publication | Score |
|---|---|
| Game Informer | 8 / 10 |
| GameSpot | 8 / 10 |
| IGN | 9 / 10 |
| PC Gamer (US) | 92 / 100 |

In 2004, Relic Entertainment was bought by THQ, which confirmed in 2007 that it had acquired the rights to the series from Relic and Sierra. No further game in the series was made before THQ declared bankruptcy in 2013; on April 22, 2013, Gearbox Software announced that they had bought the rights to the series at auction for US$1.35 million. On July 19, 2013, Gearbox announced the production of remakes of Homeworld and Homeworld 2 as Homeworld HD, later renamed Homeworld Remastered Collection. The following month, collection producer Brian Burleson stated that Gearbox had purchased the property with the express purpose of making a collection including the original and remastered versions. He also noted that neither game had code in a releasable or playable state when purchased, and they ended up recreating many of the original development tools with the assistance of the Homeworld mod community. A later posting by a developer at Gearbox further praised the mod community for their assistance in getting the original code to be playable on modern computers. The stand-alone expansion Homeworld: Cataclysm was not announced for a remake, despite the outspoken interest of Gearbox, as they were unable to find the original source code.

An in-game screenshot from the remastered version of the game depicting a battle near the mothership. The mothership is being attacked by beam and missile weapons.

Released digitally on February 25, 2015, for Windows computers by Gearbox and on August 6, 2015, for OS X by Aspyr Media, the collection includes the original and remastered versions of the two games. A retail edition of the PC version was released by Ubisoft on May 7, 2015. In addition to compatibility fixes for modern computers, the "classic" version of Homeworld removes local multiplayer and the licensed Yes song; the "remastered" version adds a new game engine for the two games, and upgraded visuals, graphical effects, models, and sound. It also initially removed some functionality not present in Homeworld 2, such as the fuel system, ballistic projectile modeling, and tactical ship formations; some of these were restored in a 2016 patch.

As of February 2017, Steam Spy estimates that over 700,000 copies of the Homeworld Remastered Collection have been sold on the Steam distribution platform. The remastered version was warmly received by critics; reviewers such as IGN's Dan Stapleton and Game Informer's Daniel Tack praised the story as still "fantastic" and "emotional", while Kevin VanOrd of GameSpot wrote that the gameplay was still entertaining 16 years later, and Tom Senior of PC Gamer applauded Gearbox's visual updates. Reviewers were more mixed on the gameplay changes included as part of the upgrade to a new game engine; VanOrd noted that some of the changes did not fit with the original game, while Tack made note of several bugs due to the gameplay modifications. Overall, the updated game was highly praised, with Senior concluding that "Homeworld is simply incredible and everyone should play it."
