= Paul Ruskay =

- Born: United States
- Genres: Film score, video games, television
- Occupations: Composer, sound designer
- Website: studioxlabs.com

Paul Ruskay is a sound designer and composer of several video games and films. He currently runs his own sound studio, Studio X Labs.

He is most noted as being the composer (with the exception of two tracks) of the game Homeworld. His style for this title differs from other composers of real time strategy game soundtracks in that instead of using climactic orchestral music, he uses an ambient electronic style with Indian influences (Music of India). He would also work as composer and sound designer for the later games in the series - Homeworld: Cataclysm, Homeworld 2, Homeworld: Deserts of Kharak, and Homeworld 3.

The Homeworld soundtrack was awarded Best Soundtrack of 1999 by the magazines PC Gamer and Eurogamer. In film, he won a Leo Award for Best Sound Editing on the short film Mon Amour Mon Parapluie in 2002, and a Leo Award for Best Music Score in a Short Drama for the film The Road That Binds Us in 2005.

Paul Ruskay is also co-founder and co-developer of Aveon Productions and The Oracle of Aveon respectively. In addition to sound design, Paul composed nearly all of the tracks on The Oracle of Aveon. The project also marks this composer's first composition for animation.

In 2013, Paul Ruskay composed the soundtrack for the Kickstarter.com-funded game Strike Suit Zero.
