= Homeworld: Deserts of Kharak =

Real-time strategy computer game

- Developer: Blackbird Interactive
- Publisher: Gearbox Software
- Producer: Jeff Lydell
- Designer: Rory McGuire
- Programmer: Gerald Orban
- Artist: Karl Gryc
- Composer: Paul Ruskay
- Series: Homeworld
- Engine: Unity
- Platforms: Windows; OS X
- Release: January 20, 2016 (Windows); June 21, 2016 (OS X)
- Genre: Real-time strategy
- Modes: Single-player, multiplayer

Homeworld: Deserts of Kharak is a real-time strategy video game developed by Blackbird Interactive and published by Gearbox Software. The game was released on January 20, 2016, and is a prequel to the 1999 space-based real-time strategy video game Homeworld.

== Development ==
Gearbox Software bought the intellectual property rights to the Homeworld franchise during THQ's bankruptcy auction in 2013. Following this, they announced that they were remaking both Homeworld and Homeworld 2 in high definition, released on Steam in February 2015 as Homeworld Remastered Collection.

After obtaining the IP rights, Gearbox granted permission for the use of the Homeworld IP to Blackbird Interactive, a company formed by members of the original Homeworld development team in 2007. At the time, Blackbird was developing a ground-based RTS game entitled Hardware: Shipbreakers, which was subsequently renamed Homeworld: Shipbreakers and announced as a prequel to Homeworld. On December 16, 2015, the game was officially announced as Homeworld: Deserts of Kharak. The game also became available for pre-order on Steam on that date. Pre-orders of Deserts of Kharak also included the Homeworld Remastered Collection for free, while those who already owned the Homeworld Remastered Collection received a 20% discount for their pre-order of Deserts of Kharak. The pre-order also came with a free copy of the interactive Expedition Guide, a DLC companion application to the game, which details the history of Kharak and its society, the expedition and its purpose, technical data on the vehicles used by the Coalition and the Gaalsien, and a behind-the-scenes look at Blackbird's founding and the eventual progression from Hardware: Shipbreakers to Deserts of Kharak. Blackbird would later revive the Shipbreaker name and concept with the space salvage simulator Hardspace: Shipbreaker, released in early access on June 16, 2020. Deserts of Kharak became available for purchase on Steam, along with the game's soundtrack by Paul Ruskay (who also composed the soundtracks for all of the previous Homeworld games), on the day the game launched.

On 15 March 2016, the Soban Fleet Pack was announced as Deserts of Kharak's first in-game DLC pack, adding Kiith Soban as a playable faction in Skirmish and Multiplayer modes. Kiith Soban is a subfaction of the Northern Coalition, but with a number of unique differences, including their own version of the Carrier, Battlecruiser, Baserunner, and Railgun vehicles. The pack is available as of 22 March 2016. A second DLC pack introduced the Khaaneph faction, clanless scavengers from Kharak's southern deserts who use salvaged, heavily modified, Gaalsien technology. The Khaaneph fleet pack was released on 26 April 2016.

== Plot ==
The game is set on the desert planet of Kharak, 106 years prior to the events of Homeworld. Kharak is a dying world. The desert grows larger with each passing year. A satellite detects the "Jaraci Object" in the Great Banded Desert. An expedition having disappeared in the desert four years earlier; the campaign centers around a second expedition, and its chief science officer, Rachel S'jet, ancestor of Karan S'jet in Homeworld.

After the expedition departs, Kiith Gaalsien (a group of religious zealots exiled from mainstream Kharakian society) attack and destroy a number of Coalition bases. The enemy attack the Kapisi at a S'jet base known as the Boneyard, while the Kapisi is undergoing final outfitting for desert operations. The Gaalsien commander Khagaan declares that the Coalition's use of satellites and other space-based technology violates a law established earlier and the Gaalisien declare war on the Coalition.

After escaping from the Boneyard under cover of a sandstorm, the Kapisi searches for their sister ship, the Kiith Siidim carrier Sakala, which also escaped its base after a Gaalsien attack.

In a region called Hell's Gate, the expedition finds the wreck of a previously launched S'jet carrier, the Ifriit Naabal, the flagship of the first expedition four years earlier; Rachel's elder brother Jacob had been the first officer of the carrier, which recovered an artifact from the wreckage of a space-going vessel called the Kalash. The expedition moves in to salvage more artifacts from the Kalash, but comes under attack from superior Gaalsien forces, led by Khagaan from the carrier Ashoka. Just as the expedition is about to be overrun, the Sakala and its escorts arrive with reinforcements, driving the Gaalsien forces off. The Sakala draws off the Ashoka while the Kapisi attacks the Gaalsien resource operations, but the Gaalsien carrier changes course to attack the Kapisi and its escorts. Despite the Gaalsien carrier's defenses and EMP weaponry, the Coalition forces engage and destroy the Ashoka which results in the deaths of Khagaan and her crew.

Approaching the edge of Gaalsien territory, the two carriers assault a Gaalsien fortress, again using the Sakala to draw off the base's defenders while the Kapisi attacks the resource operations. Accessing the Gaalsien database, Rachel discovers that her brother has survived for years in Gaalsien custody, and that the Gaalsien believe the Jaraci Object to be the mythical Khar-Toba, the "First City" and origin of Kushan civilization. The Gaalsien leader, the K'Had Sajuuk, believes he will become ruler of all Kharak if he enters the temple of Khar-Toba. Along the way, the expedition also discovers a number of shipwrecks that are largely intact in spite of their age and conditions in the desert, and Rachel theorizes that they in fact materialized inside solid rock (referencing the hyperspace abilities of vessels by the time of Homeworld), having been forcibly intercepted by the power contained within the Jaraci Object site. Making their way through a narrow canyon into a region the Gaalsien call the "Dreamlands", the Kapisi and the Sakala engage and destroy two Gaalsien carriers, and fight their way to a high plateau in order to obtain critical supplies via airborne cargo landers from their leaders in Tiir.

As the K'Had Sajuuk's forces approach the primary anomaly, a weapons satellite opens fire on them from orbit; Rachel leaves to investigate the source of the signal that triggered the satellite, as the Kapisi holds its ground against enemy forces on the plateau in order to secure a runway for the landers. Just as the Coalition forces gain the upper hand, however, the Siidim forces betray them, opening fire on the S'jet cargo landers; the Siidim, long-time enemies of the Gaalsien, declare that they alone were of divine origin and would "purify" the desert, and that Khar-Toba and its secrets were theirs to claim. Rachel discovers that the signal that triggered the orbital satellite was from a Taiidan carrier, which crashed on the surface after deploying the weapon; Jacob used the transponder to trigger the satellite himself before dying of starvation and exposure. Rachel escapes the wreck with the transponder and makes a rendezvous with the Kapisi, which engages and destroys the Sakala and its escort forces.

With the Siidim defeated, Rachel travels ahead of the expedition, discovering that Khar-Toba is in fact an ancient starship, surrounded by an ancient city buried in the sand. The expedition sets up a scanner network around the wreck to better direct the Taiidan weapon satellite in orbit, and face the K'Had Sajuuk, commanding a unique flagship-style carrier. The Coalition forces destroy the Gaalsien flagship in a heated battle; as his ship is consumed in the explosion, the K'Had Sajuuk declares that Kharak will be destroyed by fire from the sky (prophetically referencing the events of Homeworld) as a result of the Coalition's actions. At the end, Rachel reflects that her brother had believed the salvation of their people to be found in the desert as the scene pans out from Khar-Toba towards the night sky, and the future that would await the Kushan in the century to come.

=== Factions ===
Unlike the previous games, which had two separate races, all of the factions in Deserts of Kharak are Kushan, but have distinct looks from one another, and also work differently. The campaign centers around the Coalition (the player's faction) and Kiith Gaalsien; two other groups, Kiith Soban and the Khaaneph, were added in DLC packs as playable factions (in addition to the originals) for Skirmish and Multiplayer modes.

Coalition of the Northern Kiithid
A loose alliance of clans from the northern polar regions of Kharak, based in the planetary capital of Tiir, which were responsible for Kharak's spaceflight program and the discovery of the Jaraci Object. The clans involved are based largely on what vehicle designs they provide to the expedition forces; they include S'jet (the command carrier, its production facilities, and its launched aircraft), Soban (armored attack vehicles), Naabal (heavy ordinance and Baserunners), Manaan (light attack vehicles), and Somtaaw (salvagers). The Coalition makes extensive use of wheeled and tracked vehicles, heavy armor, and deployable technologies such as portable scanners, turrets, and mines, deployed by the Baserunner vehicles. Their tactics are described by the developers as being similar to the Greek phalanx and Cold War-era vehicle tactics, both of which required total commitment to battle.
Kiith Gaalsien
A renegade clan dedicated to Sajuuk, the Great Maker Whose Hand Shapes What Is. Unlike the other religious clans, the Gaalsien preached harsh punishments against those who violated Sajuuk's law. Four hundred years before the events in Deserts of Kharak, the Gaalsien were declared outlaws after destroying the city of Saju-ka, killing thousands. Well-adapted to residing in the deep desert, the Gaalsien use hover technology for their vehicles, and rely on speed and hit-and-run tactics, resulting in their vehicles being less armored than the Coalition forces. The Gaalsien also make use of railguns and self-repairing technology, recovered from wrecks in the desert. Tactically, they are described as being similar to the Mongol hordes, relying on mobility and probing for weaknesses before attacking, and the modern United States Armed Forces, using advanced technology to fight an opponent without fully committing.
Kiith Soban
A clan belonging to the Coalition, which provided most of the heavy military hardware for the expedition forces. Known as the "Grey Brotherhood", the Sobani are a mercenary kiith formed from the remnants of a clan destroyed by rivals centuries before, eventually becoming one of the most feared warrior clans on Kharak. Their vehicles are nearly identical to those of the greater Coalition, with some notable exceptions – the Sobani place greater emphasis on railguns, and both their Carrier and Battlecruiser vehicles are equipped with these weapons over the standard heavy cannons.
Khaaneph
A group of clanless scavengers from Kharak's southern deserts, descended from survivors of clans destroyed in the Heresy Wars between Kiith Gaalsien and Kiith Siidim, hundreds of years prior to Deserts of Kharak. "Khaaneph" is the Gaalsien word for "godless"; while the Coalition clans are seen as followers of "false gods" due to their emphasis on science over religion, the Khaaneph believe in nothing at all, save for their own survival. They often raid desert settlements and supply caravans, utilizing every last scrap of resources they can muster – even consuming the corpses of the dead. They use salvaged Gaalsien technology (particularly in the use of hovercraft), combined with heavy armor plating; the Khaaneph Carrier can also provide speed boosts not only for itself, but for all vehicles in a certain radius around it. They make extensive use of siege weapons, missiles, and other explosive devices.

== Backstory changes ==
The game revises continuity presented in the Homeworld Manual: Historical + Technical Briefing booklet. The latter maintains that Kiith Gaalsien self-destructed and was reduced to the status of myth centuries before the discovery of Khar-Toba and clans had long ceased major military conflicts.

== Reception ==
Reception

Aggregate score
Aggregator	Score
Metacritic	79/100

Review scores
Publication	Score
Destructoid	7.5/10
Hardcore Gamer	4/5

Homeworld: Deserts of Kharak has received "generally favorable" reviews from critics, scoring 79/100 on Metacritic.

Mark Steighner of Hardcore Gamer gave the game a 4 out of 5 saying, "Homeworld: Desert of Kharak is an accessible and well-made strategy game with outstanding production values and a legitimate claim to being part of the legendary franchise." Patrick Hancock from Destructoid rated the game a 7.5/10 saying, "the campaign is well executed for veterans and newbies alike, proving that over a decade without Homeworld is far too long." IGN awarded it a score of 8.8 out of 10, calling it a "deep, exciting, varied RTS with all the right tools." Zach Turnbull from Gone With The Win rated the game a 8/10 saying, "A good, if not ground-breaking, tactical RTS accompanied by excellent story elements. Don't expect to recreate the magic of the original Homeworld 16 years ago and you won't be disappointed.".
