= Homeworld: Cataclysm =

2000 video game

- Developer: Barking Dog Studios
- Publisher: Sierra Studios
- Composers: Paul Ruskay, Greg Sabitz
- Series: Homeworld
- Platform: Windows
- Release: NA: September 1, 2000; PAL: September 29, 2000
- Genre: Real-time strategy
- Modes: Single-player, Multiplayer

Homeworld: Cataclysm is a 2000 real-time strategy video game developed by Barking Dog Studios and published by Sierra Studios for Windows. It is the second entry in the Homeworld series and was originally developed as an expansion for Relic Entertainment's Homeworld, but was ultimately released as a stand-alone sequel. Set fifteen years after the events of the first game, Cataclysm follows the Kuun-Lan, a Kushan mining starship that attempts to counter "the Beast", a destructive nanobot virus, while combating the imperialist remnants of the Taiidan Empire, who seek revenge on the Kushan and control of Hiigara.

The game was released on September 1, 2000, in North America and September 29, 2000, in Europe to positive critical reception, and was nominated for numerous strategy game of the year awards. In June 2017, the game was rereleased on GOG.com as Homeworld: Emergence, as the name "Cataclysm" was trademarked by Blizzard Entertainment for its third expansion of World of Warcraft. Talks of a remake by Gearbox Software were reportedly conducted around the mid-2010s, but as of 2025 little news has surfaced since.

== Gameplay ==
Though it uses the same engine and similar gameplay as its predecessor, several changes were made, such as the ability to toggle time compression between normal speed and eight times faster; ship upgrades (improving armor and adding new abilities); Command Ships and Carriers receiving the ability to add external modules for ship research and fleet support; Command Ships having attack capabilities; fuel being removed from gameplay; and the sensor display can be used to issue attack orders to units. The player's Command Ship is now capable of dealing powerful attacks. The game also introduced new 3D features such as moving parts and transforming ships.

Notable unit changes include the Processor, Cataclysm's adaptation of the Resource Controller, which has medium-strength weapons to defend itself, automated repair beams to heal nearby ships and four pads to dock with Workers harvesting resources. The game's resource collectors perform the same functions that they did in the original Homeworld, however, when upgraded they can be used to capture enemy vessels, harvest crystals, and repair friendly vessels; functions that were carried out by separate, single-function ships in the first game.

In general, the main difference is the scale of fleets. Where Homeworld was biased towards large fleets (as the player's main ship was a full-fledged mothership and the opposition was an empire of galactic scale), Cataclysm down-scales the fleets (as the player's main ship is a simple mining vessel and the adversaries are all limited in resources).

== Plot ==
Fifteen years after the events of Homeworld, the Kushan people have established themselves on Hiigara and are now governed by a council formed from the leaders of their clans, or "kiith." The Taiidan Empire has collapsed, though Imperialist remnants and their allies, the Turanic Raiders, still threaten the Hiigarans and the new Taiidani Republic.

The story begins with Kuun-Lan, a mining vessel belonging to the minor Kiith Somtaaw, joining ships from several other kiithid to repel an Imperialist attack on Hiigara. While helping a disabled destroyer defend itself against a Turanic Raider assault, the Kuun-Lan finds a derelict beacon pod that does not resemble any known technology. Their Kiith-Sa (clan leader) insists that the find be kept secret due to the political advantage it might provide and sends the science ship Clee-San to help study it. However, as research begins, a strange virus begins to overtake the ship, and the Kuun-Lan is forced to jettison the affected section to avoid being completely overrun. When the Clee-San attempts to investigate further, it is infected by the virus, which soon spreads to a nearby group of Turanic Raider ships. The infected ships attack and attempt to assimilate the Kuun-Lan, forcing it to flee.

Kuun-Lan discovers that the pod they picked up was contaminated with techno-organic nanobots that can subvert both machinery and organic tissue, which they code-name "the Beast." As the Beast continues to spread and infect more ships, it grows more intelligent and strategic in its tactics, speeding its growth further and threatening to overwhelm Hiigaran and Taiidan Republic forces trying to hold it at bay. Kuun-Lan traces the source of the Beast to the Naggarok, an alien vessel from another galaxy whose crew disabled their own ship in order to contain the Beast after encountering it in hyperspace. However, the ship fired off an infected distress beacon which was eventually discovered by the Kuun-Lan, unleashing the Beast on the galaxy.

While searching for a way to combat the Beast, the Kuun-Lan discovers that the Imperialist Taiidan have allied themselves with the Beast and are attempting to use it as a weapon. Using stolen data from Taiidan experiments and a massive derelict siege cannon, the Kuun-Lan builds a weapon they hope will be effective against the Beast. Their first attempt to use it is a failure, and they are again forced to flee before the Beast can assimilate them.

The Kuun-Lan tracks down the Naggarok in the hope that a sample from the original source of the Beast will help improve their weapon and discover that the Imperialists are repairing the Naggarok, having allied with the Beast in exchange for half of the galaxy and revenge against the Hiigarans for toppling their empire. The Kuun-Lan succeeds in analyzing the Beast, but fails to stop the Imperialists. The fully repaired Naggarok escapes, and the Kuun-Lan races to find the Bentusi, the original creators of the siege cannon, in order to improve it further. With their anti-Beast weapon complete, they lure the infected Clee-San and former section of their ship into a trap and successfully destroy both.

Kuun-Lan follows the Naggarok to a Taiidan Republic battle station, which the Beast has infected and is using to shield the Naggarok. The Kuun-Lan refuses the Beast's offer of an alliance and destroys the station, rendering the Naggarok vulnerable. The Imperialists renege on their bargain with the Beast, prompting it to reveal that it always intended to assimilate them once they were no longer useful to it. The Imperialists flee, and the Kuun-Lan destroys the Naggarok.

With the Naggarok destroyed, the Beast fleet's capabilities are greatly reduced, and the remainder of the Beast-infected ships are destroyed. A vaccine against the Beast is also discovered, ensuring it will never return again. Thanks to the Kuun-Lan's role in defeating the Beast, Kiith Somtaaw gains great prestige in Hiigaran society and its members are honored with the title of "Beastslayers".

== Ships ==
Since Homeworld: Cataclysm takes place only 15 years after, and uses essentially the same game engine as Homeworld, several ships make a return, notably in the "new" Hiigarans/Kushan, and the Taiidan forces (both Imperialist and Republic). Some new features in this game not previously seen are ship upgrades and Support Units--the latter of which put a lower cap on the player's fleet size as opposed to the maximum fleet size of 300 in Homeworld.

While the Kushan and Taiidan fleets remain almost identical to their Homeworld counterparts, the player's clan, Kiith Somtaaw, is forced to scratch its own fleet specs based on salvaged technologies. The player's own ships are all new and superior to both Taiidan and Kushan counterparts and are only matched by the main adversary, the Beast and its own fleet (which is composed of assimilated Taiidan, Kushan, Somtaaw and Turanic Raider ships).

== Reception ==
Reception

Aggregate score
Aggregator	Score
Metacritic	89/100

Review scores
Publication	Score
CNET Gamecenter	9/10
Computer Gaming World	5/5
EP Daily	9/10
Eurogamer	8/10
Game Informer	8/10
GameSpot	8.9/10
GameSpy	91%
GameZone	8.5/10
IGN	9.2/10
Next Generation	4/5
PC Gamer (US)	91%

The game received "generally favorable reviews", according to the review aggregation website Metacritic. Samuel Bass of NextGen called it "one of those rare sequels in which more of the same is definitely a good thing." Brian Wright of GamePro's website-only review said that the game "shows what can happen when developers listen to the fans and make changes according to their suggestions and complaints. While the gameplay remains the same, the new features and improvements make Homeworld: Cataclysm even more enjoyable the original." (Note: GamePro gave the game three 4.5/5 scores for graphics, sound, and fun factor, and 4/5 for control.)

The staff of Computer Gaming World nominated it as the best strategy game of 2000, although it lost to Sacrifice. The game was also nominated for the "Strategy Game of the Year" award at GameSpot's Best and Worst of 2000 Awards, which went to Shogun: Total War. It was also nominated for the "Best Graphics in a PC Game" and "Best Strategy Game for PC" awards at The Electric Playground's Blister Awards 2000, both of which also went to Sacrifice.

== Legacy ==
Homeworld: Cataclysm works on both 32-bit and 64-bit versions of Windows XP, Vista, and 7 after being patched to version 1.01. However, as with its predecessor, graphical glitches frequently occur when not using the software renderer. OpenGL may be enabled by running the game in compatibility mode of Windows NT 4.0 (Service Pack 5). The game is locked at a 4:3 aspect ratio, however, Widescreen resolutions may be applied by editing the registry.

The Remastered Edition from Gearbox Software, the new owners of the Homeworld IP, has been updated to be fully compatible with all versions of Windows and includes both updated and original copies of both games. This collection does not include Homeworld: Cataclysm as it has been reported that the source code for this game has been lost, while others report that potentially former developers have a backup and that the audio assets are available. In February 2015, Gearbox announced that they are still interested in remaking Cataclysm, if the source code would be found. In a February 18, 2015 Twitch interview, former Cataclysm developers stated that a remake should be possible even without the Cataclysm source code but with the Homeworld Remastered engine.
