= Men of War (video game) =

2008 video game

- Developers: Best Way; Digitalmindsoft
- Publisher: 1C Company
- Producers: Sergey Gerasev; Maxim Kamensky
- Designers: Dmitry Morozov; Chris Kramer
- Series: Men of War
- Engine: GEM 2
- Platform: Windows
- Release: RU: 14 November 2008; EU: 20–27 February 2009; AU: 23 March 2009; NA: 10 March 2009
- Genre: Real-time tactics
- Modes: Single-player, multiplayer, co-op

Men of War (Russian: В тылу врага 2: Лис пустыни, or Behind Enemy Lines 2: Desert Fox) is a 2008 real-time tactics video game sequel to Faces of War developed by Ukrainian company Best Way. Players issue orders to and/or take direct control of soldiers on a simulation-driven battlefield.

The game takes place during World War II and its single-player campaign features battles set in Europe, the Soviet Union, Greece, and North Africa across three different campaigns for the Allies, Germans and Soviets. Japan was introduced as a multiplayer faction in a later patch.

== Features ==
Men of War is a real-time tactics game in which players complete military objectives. It focuses entirely on military tactics and special operations and does not feature base building, research, or resource gathering. Unit recruitment features in multiplayer, but is rarely enabled in single-player.

=== Simulation ===
The game's most notable feature is its simulation-driven world. Examples include:

- Each soldier and vehicle has an inventory which holds weapons and a finite amount of ammunition and supplies.
  - Items can be picked up from the ground or traded.
- Each vehicle and emplacement is operated by soldiers who can enter and leave it at will.
- Each vehicle has components that can be damaged and repaired instead of an abstract health value.
- Line of sight is calculated accurately.
- Buildings have fully modelled interiors that soldiers can freely navigate.
- Bullets and shells are blocked by solid objects.
- Nearly anything can be destroyed, and destruction is physically simulated with solid debris.
- Fire spreads.

These rules lead to gameplay that has been described as "organic...where others are artificial" and praised for generating "stories as distinct as they are dramatic", but criticised for at times demanding intense micromanagement. Perhaps in recognition of this, players can change the speed at which time passes.

=== Direct Control ===
Men of War allows a player to directly control any soldier or manned vehicle/gun that he owns. Movement is controlled with four directional keys and a stance toggle, while the unit aims/faces toward the on-screen mouse cursor and fires when the player clicks his mouse button.

"Direct Control" can be used to perform advanced actions such as targeting individual vehicle components, navigating precisely around cover, and cooking a grenade. It has also been described as "dissolving the emotional distance between player and unit".

=== Campaign ===
The single-player portions of Men of War comprise 19 missions spread across Soviet, German, and Allied campaigns and a "bonus" campaign of offcuts. The game focuses on some of the less-known battles of World War II and does not feature famous battles like the Invasion of Normandy or Battle of Stalingrad.

=== Soviet Campaign ===
The Soviet campaign spans the early battles of the Eastern Front, through to the start of the Soviet counter-offensive. The campaign begins with the Battle of Rostov and ends after the Battle of Seelow Heights, with an epilogue showing Berlin days after its capture. The Player is represented by Alexey Kuznetsov (who also plays a role in Men of War: Red Tide) and Victor Smirnov.

Shortly after Operation Barbarossa, Alexey Kuznetsov and Victor Smirnov are enlisted into the Red Army, but during their travel to Rostov they are suddenly attacked by Stuka dive-bombers. Their column is destroyed and they are forced to continue on foot. After an encounter with an armoured car, they get to the H.Q of a local defending zone. The Commander allows them to take some soldiers with them to advance into the village, captured by the Germans. They find an empty disabled KV-1 heavy tank which they repair. They use the tank in their assault on the village and ravage the Germans in the village. Later, the team is given the objective of taking a strategic hill in the area. They do, but they notice a column of tanks advancing on their position, using the tank, they destroy it and are given the order to retreat. Days later, Alexey and Victor arrive at the Rostelmash factory, where the Soviets are evacuating civilians and any machinery they can transport. The two are put in command of defences at the offices, boilers and storages. They are given just enough time to turn it into a fortress, with anti-tank guns, sandbags and mines, but the German assault is just as strong, stomping through quite quickly. When the train is fully supplied, the Soviets board and evacuate, narrowly evading the German forces. Victor gets away, but when Alexey tries to catch up, he is knocked out in an explosion. When he regains consciousness, he is captured by Germans. Alexey is sent to a village where a recruitment camp is being set up. The SS interrogate him, but a partisan group attacks the village, allowing him to escape. Alexey gets to the partisans, and they inform him of a German H.Q. in the village. Fighting their way through the village and freeing several more POWs along the way, they manage to capture the H.Q. There, Alexey finds documents containing valuable info on German intelligence networks in the Soviet Union. German reinforcements close in, forcing the partisans to retreat. They then hold their ground to give Alexey and his group enough time to get away.

Meanwhile, Victor Smirnov is in Moscow. He is sent to a nearly completed defence line. Receiving reports of German forces nearby, he is forced to hold out with a chain of dugouts and foxholes. Repelling German attacks and even a flanking attack on the nearby dam, the light defences look ready to collapse. Fortunately, Smirnov is given the order to retreat, as the main line of defence is completed. Facing a fully manned enemy force, the German force fails to break through and falls back.

Alexey Kuznetsov finally gets back to Soviet territory, but is captured by the NKVD. They suspect him of being a deserter, and refuse to believe his documents, instead sending him to a penal unit. Near Rezhev, Alexey leads a charge to capture a strategic hill. Despite most of the unit being killed by mines, machine guns or blocking detachments, they capture the hill, later defending it from a counterattack. Proving his loyalty, Alexey is reinstated to his regular unit.

=== German Campaign ===
The German campaign takes place in the North Africa theatre and follows a young, ambitious commander called Gunther Borg who fights as a paratrooper in Operation Mercury (Battle of Crete) before being redeployed after temporary leave to join the Afrika Korps in Libya (Tobruk) and Tunisia. After training for the operation, German paratroopers under the command of general Gunther Borg land in Maleme, Crete. Three soldiers (Ulf Liechtman, Wurzen Knopf and Max Luderer) end up on the beach and stock up on supplies from a weapons crate dropped nearby. The trio later rescue the rest of their squad that was captured, as well as regroup with other paratroopers. As the battle continues, a large convoy passes by, threatening the entire attack. Using captured guns and vehicles, the paratroopers manage to destroy the convoy, saving the assault. Receiving reinforcements, the Germans push their way to Maleme airfield, facing British Matilda II tanks and AA guns along the way. Despite fierce resistance, Borg manages to capture the control tower of the airfield, allowing German Ju 52 transport planes to land. However hidden AA guns open fire on the first aircraft to arrive, destroying it. To prevent further incidents like this, Borg orders a charge on the other side of the airfield and despite high casualties, succeeds. With the airfield taken, reinforcements flood in, leading to the eventual capture of Crete. Gunther Borg is allowed to go on leave following Operation Mercury. Later, he is called up to command the 11th Panzer Division in North Africa. Not long after, the British launch Operation Crusader. At Sidi Rezegh, Borg, assisted by fellow commander Vinzenz Kaiser, are warned of a large British tank assault. At first, the defence goes quite well, with German 88mm guns decimating weak British Crusader tanks. The Germans even manage to destroy an artillery battery harassing them, but with defence lines falling apart, Erwin Rommel orders them to fall back and regroup with his division. However, he is stalled by New Zealand troops and Borg ends up having to hold out on open ground. With the support of the Luftwaffe, he holds out until Rommel's troops arrive. Following the events at Sidi Rezegh, Erwin Rommel places Borg in command of the assault on Tobruk. German troops cross the tank ditch and destroy tank traps on the road so panzers can advance. Borg forces his way through the city, despite heavy losses on both sides. Once they reach the coast, assistant commander Paul Weiss suggests placing artillery there to hit transport ships attempting to resupply the defenders. His idea works as the British attempt an amphibious landing to counterattack. The Germans stop the attack and destroy a large convoy of supply ships. Borg then assaults an isolated fort inside the city, completely surrounded by the Germans. They capture it and prepare for the assault on the second line of walls, but a German soldier discovers a secret tunnel in the fort leading to the inner city. Borg orders five soldiers to go have a look around. As they go, a Stuka dive-bomber accidentally destroys the tunnel, leaving them trapped. Knowing that Borg will soon break through and that almost every soldier is at the walls, the squad attacks the large fuel depot. They secure it and disable detonators placed by the British in case of a defeat. Using what they can, the squad holds out until advance units of Germans arrive. Tobruk is finally taken, and Rommel (subsequently Borg) receive promotions. However, desperate to conserve his forces, Rommel retreats deep into Libya. Borg, commander of the 11th Panzer Division, encounters a partly dried river. A small squad is sent up and encounters a patrol which they quickly dispose of. Continuing, they find anti tank mines, and a small settlement guarded by American troops. They raid it and kill the enemy as well as a radioman who attempts to call for reinforcements. In the settlement, the squad finds a mine detector which they use to clear the mined road, allowing trucks under Max Luderer (now a commander) to advance, but Allies troops begin attacking from both sides in an attempt to cut the Germans off. Holding them off, Borg calls for air support. The dive bombers not only obliterate the enemy, but also cause a rockslide, covering the pass. This forces Luderer to use the second pass. Borg successfully protects the convoys and it escapes with minimal casualties. Borg finally arrives in Tunis, where Rommel is evacuating the Afrika Korps. Borg now prepares to defend with what he has left. An Italian destroyer is in the bay, giving him naval artillery support. As the battle rages on, the Germans receive reports that the British have brought up rocket artillery to destroy the ship. A squad is sent behind enemy lines to destroy the battery. Just as it prepares to fire they manage to kill the commander and stop it. Securing the rockets, they use it against the Allies, bombarding their positions. Meanwhile, the Germans have been pushed back to their final defence line. As they desperately hold the line, their destroyer is sunk by air strikes. They finally receive the order to fall back and Borg escapes on a submarine. Despite almost the entire rearguard killed or captured, they gave valuable time for the Afrika Korps to escape to Italy. Gunther Borg states that he has not abandoned Africa and that soon, he'll be back.

=== Allied Campaign ===
The Allied campaign also takes place in North Africa and follows an elite American squad under the command of Terry Palmer (a former anti-war journalist) and a Cpl. Robinson during Operation Torch as they fight alongside the British 7th Armoured Division (the "Desert Rats"), other American soldiers, and Henri d'Astier's French Resistance.

In the beginning of the campaign in the 'Arsenal' mission, a group of four commandos including Palmer and Robinson head into an unnamed town in Northern Algeria. In the cover of night, the squad sneaks their way through the town to a tower where they meet a French Resistance contact. The commandos then move to take out the German town garrison and capture the military supply base nearby. After taking the military base, the group is joined by armed civilians in the defense of the captured base. The squad, supported by the French Resistance, then holds off waves of German troops and vehicles. Meanwhile, the French Resistance loads up a truck with supplies for the commandos to leave in. The group takes some resistance members with them, and may also tow a gun with them

In the next mission, called 'Armistice', the commandos arrive outside the residence of Admiral Francois Darlan in Algiers. They are tasked with capturing and negotiating a deal with the Admiral, in order to prevent the Vichy French forces in Algeria from disrupting the Operation Torch invasion. The commandos and the French Resistance break into the residence, taking out the garrison either stealthily or noisy. After blocking escape for Darlan, they set up defenses with the help of French Resistance reinforcements. The group then holds off attacks on the residence. The contract is eventually signed by Darlan, and the mission ends.

Time skips ahead a little bit for the next mission, 'Meeting the Enemy'. Operation Torch has worked successfully as planned, and now Allied troops prepare for the Tunisia Campaign. Palmer and Robinson reluctantly leave their new French friends to prepare for a new mission. They stumble upon a newly built Luftwaffe airfield during a sandstorm. The commandos first infiltrate a town and take out the garrison in the cover of the dust. The sandstorm subsides as an American troop column arrives at the town, fortifying it. Without the cover of the storm, the whole company cannot assault the airfield in fear of revealing their positions to German planes. The commandos are once again sent into the impossible. They infiltrate the air base and take out nearly the whole garrison before the German troops retreat. The American troops rush ahead and capture the air base, helping to kill any stragglers, ending the mission.

The next mission, called 'Disaster in Tunisia', involves the squad yet again, this time fighting in an armored car fit with a machine gun-bazooka turret. By this time, the Allies have been stricken with loss as the seasons change with delays in the advance into North Africa. This has given time for Rommel and his Afrika Korps to attack and defeat Allied forces in Tunisia. The goal is to reach a major military outpost to warn the garrison of an imminent attack on the area by the Afrika Korps. The group swerves through Sbeitla, surprising the German garrison. They attack and defeat the initial defense, but they are forced to stop to retrieve fuel from the area they just attacked as a result of a breakdown in the fuel pipe. While Corporal Robinson repairs the fuel pipe, Palmer and two other commandos attack the remaining garrison and retrieve fuel, which they take back to the truck to move on. The squad continues, swerving and fighting through the sands until they break down again in a small outpost. While Robinson repairs the truck, the group uses mounted machine guns and an anti tank gun to defend the position from German attacks. After fending off multiple troop waves and a few armored vehicles, the group continues in the armored car. The group continues and is halted once again at a roadblock, which must be blown up by the engineer. The group defends the area from more attacks, and then continues once the roadblock is removed. The next area finds the group interrupted by an anti tank gun stationed on a hill. The group moves out to disable the gun and its crew so they can safely continue. After the objective is completed, they continue down a narrow African street where they are assaulted in close quarters combat. After safely making it through the street, they arrive at the final location, where yet another roadblock is present in the form of a debris pile. The group holds off waves of German troops while the engineer, Robinson, creates three dynamite charges. After planting the three, they blow up the roadblock and continue onto the next mission.

In the finale of the Allied Campaign, the group arrives at the American base during the night in the mission 'Turning Point'. The group warns the commander of the base about the imminent German attack. The base is full of various British and American armaments, such as tanks and guns. The garrison, however, is undermanned and pressured for time to prepare. Only a few of the armaments are able to be used in the initial defense, but the Allied troops manage to hold off the initial wave of attackers with somewhat heavy losses of their own in a bloody, action filled battle. After holding off various waves of attackers, the Allies receive some reinforcements which are quickly put to use. More waves of attackers arrive, including heavy armored Tiger tanks. After holding off another group of attackers, the defense uses the time to repair damaged vehicles or replace destroyed vehicles with new ones, possibly even making use of captured superior Tiger tanks. The battle continues, with another large group of German attackers coming in multiple waves. After the final defense concludes, the Allies reorganize and regroup to prepare for an assault on the remaining German troops, who have fallen back and taken up their own defense. Using repaired, captured or left over vehicles, the Allies go forward and attack the German defense with use of strategy and tactics to overcome the numerically superior German's. Once the assault concludes with an Allied victory, the campaign ends with success.

=== Bonus ===
The bonus missions are a collection of challenging scenarios with no particular continuity. They include battles such as the Battle Of Vernon.

Campaign missions typically give the player a predetermined set of troops and pit them against overwhelming odds on large battlefields. They range from infiltration's with four or fewer soldiers at the player's command to all-out battles with hundreds of troops and tons of vehicles, sometimes within the same mission. AI units are typically docile until attacked, allowing players time to form plans and eliminate enemy troops in small chunks.

=== Multiplayer ===
A "Victory Flag" multiplayer game. The recruitment bar is visible to the right.

Men of War includes 16-player internet and LAN multiplayer across six game modes. Multiplayer games retain most simulation features and Direct Control, and add unit recruitment and capture points. All armies from the campaign can be selected (USA, Commonwealth, German, Soviet), and the Japanese Army was added after release.

Game modes are:

Battlezones
Players fight for control of three flags.
Combat
A simple deathmatch mode.
Frontlines
An attack/defend mode in which one player must capture the other's territory.
Cooperative
All campaign missions can be played cooperatively.
Victory Flag
Similar to Battlezones, but with only one flag.
Valuable Cargo
Players search the map for randomly spawned cargo and carry it back to their base.

The game features a skill ranking system for online play.

== Development ==
Development on Men of War began in 2006 with the intention to create a polished successor to Faces of War. Ukrainian series developer Best Way led development with assistance from Digitalmindsoft, a new German studio formed with Best Way's assistance by Faces of War modder Chris Kramer. Digitalmindsoft were to provide "Western soul" to the game; Kramer described this as "combining the new ideas and innovations [of eastern European countries] with great in-game atmosphere and smooth gameplay [of Western studios]".

The game was developed by a team of 30 at Best Way and 15 at Digitalmindsoft. Best Way developed the game's engine and core simulation systems, while Digitalmindsoft provided mission/world design, visuals, and audio and organised a large beta test.

== Reception ==
Men of War

Aggregate score
Aggregator	Score
Metacritic	80

Review scores
Publication	Score
Eurogamer	90
GameSpot	75
IGN	80
PC Gamer (UK)	85
Absolute Games	65%
Play Magazine Poland	70

Men of War has received generally favorable reviews, garnering a Metacritic score of 80 out of 100.

- Eurogamer praised the game for generating "stories as distinct as they are dramatic" and compared it favorably to Company of Heroes, but criticized its "faintly disappointing" stealth missions.
- GameSpot described Direct Control as "well-crafted" but criticized the game's graphics and "pathetic English-language voice acting".
- IGN criticized the game's "aggravating" pathfinding and "tedious" micromanagement, but still concluded that it was a "revelation...like watching all your favorite war movies play out in front of your eyes".
- Rock, Paper, Shotgun called the game "spectacular" and "organic...where others are artificial", but criticized its "disastrous" voice acting, "tedious and pointless" cut-scenes, and occasionally "brutal" difficulty.

== Expansions, sequel and related games ==
Several standalone expansions were released for Men of War: Red Tide, Assault Squad, Vietnam, Condemned Heroes, Assault Squad 2 and Assault Squad 2: Men of War Origins.

Men of War: Red Tide contains multiple campaigns based on the World War II feats of the Soviet Naval Infantry of the Black Sea Fleet, and has the largest number of missions in the series. It is also the only game to feature Italy and Romania as factions, although they are only playable through the editor.

Men of War: Assault Squad is the first predominantly multiplayer based game of the series, but is also known for its large array of single player skirmish missions.

Men of War: Vietnam is about the Vietnam War, with two short campaigns featuring North Vietnamese and Soviet commandos, and American commandos respectively.

Men of War: Condemned Heroes features the Soviet penal battalions of World War II.

Men of War: Assault Squad 2 is a remaster of the original Assault Squad game. Improvements include enhanced graphics, more skirmish missions, more multiplayer features, enhanced Steam integration and full Workshop modding integration. The game is, like its predecessor, based mainly on multiplayer. Two expansions were released: Airborne and Iron Fist.

Assault Squad 2: Men of War Origins is a remaster of Men of War based on the Assault Squad 2 engine. Some of the enhanced models and content are included in a free update for Assault Squad 2. The game was released in August 2016.

Call to Arms, a spiritual successor to Men of War series, is set in a conflict between the United States Army and the fictional Global Revolutionary Movement in the modern era. A DLC named Gates of Hell was developed by Barbed Wire Studios and is currently available in Steam Early Access program.

The original makers of Soldiers: Heroes of World War II, Faces of War, and Men of War released Men of War II: Arena, based on a heavily improved GEM engine. The servers were shut down in September 2021, as development shifted to a full-feature sequel of the original Men of War, titled Men of War II, which was released in May 2024.

Best Way published Battle of Empires: 1914-1918 by Great War Team, an independently-made GEM engine game.
