= Video games in Ukraine =

Video gaming in Ukraine emerged after the country's independence in 1991. Subsequently, in the 2000s, several major video game series started appearing.

== Overview ==
Despite its large size, studies of the Ukrainian video game industry only began in the second half of the 2000s. In part, this has been caused by the classes of Ukrainian developers, especially with regard to the value of its projects. But it was not a mystery that the creation of video games in Ukraine is cheaper than in the United States and Western Europe. In the country, various orders were performed, except for sounding and animation with the capture of the motion of actors. The reason for this was called market requirements and the lack of desired technologies. The volume of the Ukrainian video game market in 2013 became the largest history, 300 million US dollars. However, most of the profits are abandoned by foreign publishers. Some editions are called video games by the main cultural export of Ukraine to the west.

Major video game developers in Ukraine include GSC Game World, Best Way, Action Forms, 4A Games, N-Game Studios, Мeridian'93, Frogwares, Boolat Game Development Company, Dereza Production Studio, Persha Studia, Cyber Light Game Studio and Deep Shadows. The largest number of development studios are based in Kyiv.

== History ==
=== The origin: the 1990s ===
In 1993, Meridian'93 studio was founded. It was they who created the first commercial Ukrainian game - Admiral Sea Battles devoted to marine battles. Dmitry Prokopov developed a concept game, wrote a script and worked on graphics. The creation of the concept was also participated in by the programmer Andriy Doroshchuk, and Viktor Sylak who also engaged in graphics. Music was written by Andrei Vasylenko. All of them then worked on over two subsequent team projects: Ancient Conquest and Submarine Titans. And Doroshchuk, Sylak and two more programmers from the team, Gregory Podgorny and Artem Kulakov, as part of The Creative Assembly Australia, even took part in the development of such strategies as Medieval II: Total War and Stormrise.

At the exhibition in Hamburg, where the developers went to present their game, they met representatives of the German company Koch Media (later it created a special Deep Silver label for video games). As a result of cooperation, the Germans were engaged in a publishing house and distribution agreement of Meridian'93 products in the West. In particular, they distributed Admiral Sea Battles in Germany. The release took place on September 30, 1996.

=== The first hits: the 2000s ===
In 2001, the first part of the series Cossacks - European Wars, developed by GSC Game World. The idea to create the game Cossacks appeared in 1997, when Age of Empires was released, the development of the game began in 1998. The 17th-18th centuries were chosen because the Middle Ages would most likely be chosen to continue the Age of Empires and the Cossacks would emerge as its logical continuation rather than a competitor. Initially, there was to be a confrontation between Ukraine and Russia in the Cossacks, and there were to be 4 nations in total: Ukrainians, Russians, Europeans, and Ottomans. The game was to be sold on the domestic market. After the MILIA exhibition in Cannes, where the demo version of the Cossacks received good reviews from reputable people involved in the creation and publishing of video games, it was decided to increase the number of nations to 16 and publish the game around the world. In order to be able to reproduce thousands of units on the map, a 2D version of the graphics was selected. The following year saw the continuation of the series - Cossacks: Back to War.

In the middle of the decade, the following games appeared: Sherlock Holmes, Vivisector: Beast Within, Cossacks 2: Napoleonic Wars, Soldiers: Heroes of World War II, Cryostasis: Sleep of Reason and Faces of War.

In 2007, the S.T.A.L.K.E.R. series was released by GSC Game World. The first release was Shadow of Chernobyl, in development for six years. Later, books and movies appeared behind the game. The game takes place in an alternate reality, where on April 14, 2008 (there is a contradiction - the game itself mentions the date of April 12, 2008, and on the official website - April 12, 2006) there was a second explosion at the Chernobyl nuclear power plant. This explosion caused the appearance of the "Zone" - a place within which, various anomalous phenomena appear, such as a multidirectional gravitational flow of more than 100G.

=== Growth: the 2010s ===
In 2010 a new part of the series S.T.A.L.K.E.R. - Call of Pripyat. The action of the project "S.T.A.L.K.E.R.: Call of Pripyat" unfolds after the events of the original game - that is, after the shooter destroyed the project "O-Consignment". Having received information about the opening of the road to the center of the zone, the government decides to deploy a large-scale military operation under the code name "Fairway" to receive control over Chernobyl Nuclear Power Plant. In accordance with the developed plan, the first group of military must go for air intelligence of the territory and make detailed schemes of the locations of abnormal formations. Subsequently, these safe passages will have to be secured by the main forces of the military. Despite thorough preparation, the operation fails. To collect information about the causes of the failure, the Security Service of Ukraine directs its agent to the center of the zone. Further events depend only on the player.

Also in this year, studio 4A Games released METRO 2033. The early GDC 2006 demo build of the game used the X-Ray Engine that has been used in the Stalker Game series. The game uses a multi-platform version of 4A Engine, which is transferred to the Xbox 360, PlayStation 3 and Microsoft Windows. There was a controversy where the game's engine was stated to be based on a version of X-Ray (as claimed by Sergei Grigorovich, the founder, GSC Game World, as well as users who saw screenshots of the 4A Engine SDK, marking visual similarity, shared resources and technical changes in the pre-training demo). 4A Engine was made after a GSC Game World scandal, or it is its own development (according to 4A Games and Olesya Shishkovtseva in particular, which claims it to be unthinkable to recycle X-Ray to support playing consoles). 4A Engine uses NVIDIA PHYSX support, improved artificial intelligence (AI), as well as a console SDK for Xbox 360. The PC version includes DIRECTX 11 support and is described as a "love player message" thanks to developers' decision to make a PC version [especially] phenomenal". On October 22, 2009, THQ officially announced that it will be a publisher of the game "Metro 2033". It was stated that the game will come out in early 2010 for PC and Xbox 360. Together with this statement, a game trailer was released. On November 2, 2008-2009, the Russian publisher and localizer "Akella" announced the signing of the contract with THQ on the publication of the Metro 2033 on the territory of Russia and the CIS countries.

== Statistics ==
As of 2018, 84% of video game developers produce mobile games for iOS and Android and more than 50% develop or plan to develop games for VR and AR devices. The average salary of a game developer in Ukraine is $1,375. According to a study, Unity is considered to be the most popular game engine in the country, used by 69% of game developers. The largest genres are action (40%) and adventure (42%). In total, the Ukrainian video game industry employs about 20,000 people. 75% of local company offices are based in Ukraine. Almost 90% of video game studios are self-funded. The audience of games that were created by Ukrainian developers is more than 770 million users. The most popular video games in the country were created by Plarium, Ubisoft and Wargaming.

== Notable video game companies ==
- 4A Games
- Best Way
- GSC Game World
- Pinokl Games
- Vostok Games
- Room 8 Group

== Defunct video game companies ==
- Action Forms Ltd.
- Bear Games
- Black Wing Foundation
- Deep Shadows
- Dereza Production Studio
- Digital Spray Studios
  - Newtonic Studio
- DVS
- Electronic Paradise
- Amax Interactive
- JED Games
- Mandel ArtPlains
- Megalodon Studio
- mPower Games Studio
- Panther Gaming Llc
- Persha Studia
- X-calibur Games
- Butterfly iSoft

== Video game publishers ==
- Anate Studio
- ANT_game_developer
- Artificial Core
- AtomTeam
- Beatshapers
- Black Angle Games
- Blackrose Arts
- Bloody Pixel Games
- Brenntkopf Studio Kharkiv
- Bunker 22
- CodeMyGod (Vladyslav Lytvynov)
- Devil's Dozen Games
- DogHowl Games
- FangsLab
- FantaJI Games
- Farom Studio
- FingerTipsAndCompany
- Gamirare
- Gismart
- Graverobber Foundation
- IEVO
- Lepka games
- Marginal act
- Mauris Games
- Meowgical Games
- MiroWin Studio
- Mixtape Games
- NightCat Studios
- PimpGameStudio
- Poem of Three
- Project by MeRRFiS
- PTW
- quadruped
- Rapid Snail
- Roenko Games
- Saint G
- Sandman Team
- Skmaestro
- Spacedev Games
- Starni Games
- stormnebulae
- Ternox Games
- Tobi Torba Games
- Triomatica Games
- Two Cakes Studio
- VidyGames
- WeeCodeLab B.V.
- Whale Rock Games
- White Noise Team

== Notable video games developed in Ukraine ==
- Cossacks (video games series)
- Football, Tactics & Glory
- Frontline: Fields of Thunder
- GEM engine series (eg. Men of War series)
- Metro 2033
- Metro: Last Light
- Metro Exodus
- S.T.A.L.K.E.R.: Call of Pripyat
- S.T.A.L.K.E.R.: Clear Sky
- S.T.A.L.K.E.R.: Shadow of Chernobyl
- S.T.A.L.K.E.R. 2: Heart of Chornobyl
- Survarium
- No One Lives Under the Lighthouse
