= Call to Arms (2018 video game) =

2015 real-time strategy video game

- Developer: Digitalmindsoft
- Publisher: Digitalmindsoft
- Platform: Microsoft Windows
- Release: April 27, 2018
- Genres: Real-time strategy, real-time tactics
- Modes: Single-player, multiplayer

Call to Arms is a real-time tactics and strategy video game developed by the German company Digitalmindsoft as the spiritual successor to the Men of War series. It was released in April 2018. A stand-alone expansion pack, titled Gates of Hell: Ostfront, was developed by Barbedwire Studios and released in 2021, with Digitalmindsoft remaining as the publisher.

== Gameplay ==
Call to Arms is a real-time tactics and strategy video game.

The Domination game mode requires each team to take strategic points on a map, with the number of points decided by the number of players. The first team to take the greater number of points wins the round.

The game provides bots possessing artificial intelligence in multiplayer mode.

The base game provides 12 vehicles and 60 pieces of equipment.

== Development ==
=== Design ===
Video game developer Digitalmindsoft announced Call to Arms on their website in December 2012, calling it the "true successor" to the Men of War series. The developer saw an opportunity to develop a real-time strategy video game set in the modern day, especially with the gameplay common to the Men of War series.

The developer planned for two playable factions and an assortment of other features for when the game was released, and planned to extend the game through additional units, factions, and maps thereafter. Digitalmindsoft planned their factions to be asymmetric, fun-to-play, and fair. The factions are based on modern factions. Digitalmindsoft also planned to allow the player to control a unit's specific actions in a third-person view, similar to Men of War: Assault Squad, as well as allow players to build their own mods for the game. For the single-player mode, Digitalmindsoft wanted to implement what the players wanted, though they were aware that they were limited by their crowdfunding campaign. The developer said that there would be a focus on the infantry-level interaction rather than an interaction with heavy weaponry such as tanks and airplanes, but that heavy weaponry would be playable.

Although Digitalmindsoft had improved on the series's gameplay mechanics in Assault Squad, the company wanted to continue to focus on ease-of-gameplay improvements in Call to Arms. Chris Kramer, managing director of Digitalmindsoft, noted that there was a balance between making the game realistic and between making the game well-balanced and easy to play, as well as a balance between freedom-of-choice and game balance. He later made the point that the two games would play differently because they were set in two different periods of time, owing to the change in warfare. When asked about the quality of Men of War series co-developer 1C Company's games Men of War: Vietnam and Men of War: Condemned Heroes, Kramer said it was more important to self-improve than to critique 1C's games. Kramer also said that Digitalmindsoft was designing a new cooperative system relative to Assault Squad.

Although Lace Mamba Global was originally announced to be the publisher, PC Gamer reported in early 2015 that the publisher would be the developer, Digitalmindsoft.

Players who purchased the deluxe edition could beta test the unfinished campaigns. In the multiplayer mode, Digitalmindsoft wanted to integrate the personnel units first and then later the vehicles.

=== Game engine ===
In January 2013, Digitalmindsoft released a video of the game physics, which Rock, Paper, Shotgun (RPS) said "[showed] a game that looks a lot like Men Of War with better voice acting". In an interview published shortly after, Kramer said that the game would make use of an updated GEM game engine to allow for better game performance. After another routine release of game screenshots and a video, RPS agreed with their earlier statement about the appearance of the game. Kramer thought that the engine should get a new name because of several new graphical improvements. Men of War: Assault Squad 2, released in May 2014 before Call to Arms, was also built using the Call to Arms engine, which PC Gamer identified as an opportunity to test the engine.

Digitalmindsoft wanted to include "integrated in-game video capture software", and support for Steam was assumed.

The game has a map and mission editor, which support Steam Workshop. The game also provides a replay function.

=== Crowdfunding and schedule ===
While Digitalmindsoft was funded to begin the project, the company sought crowdfunding as an extra source of revenue, offering better game performance and content as well as a list of rewards for stretch goals such as "skill-based matchmaking and support for Steam Workshop and Steam Cloud". Kickstarter was not available in mainland Europe in 2012, so Digitalmindsoft crowdfunded the game through their website. The company sought 100,000 Euros; within a day, the project had €1,500 and 80 backers. ShackNews and PC Gamer expressed reservations regarding crowdfunding, qualifying them due to the company's experience in this genre of video gaming and the fan base for the Men of War series. The developer expected to release the game in 2014.

RPS attributed slow crowdfunding in January 2013 to a "remarkable lack of assets". When they spoke with Kramer later that month, he said that the company wanted to improve the game quality prior to starting a Kickstarter campaign, which would have heightened the game's profile before they were ready. RPS thought that it was likely that people were waiting for the game to have the quality of Assault Squad prior to funding the game. In March, Wargamer reported that project had been crowdfunded for €5.5 thousand with less than a week left in the campaign, though they were informed by Digitalmindsoft that this was not the final goal. That July, Digitalmindsoft announced Men of War: Assault Squad 2 with a release date of Q4 2013, leaving both RPS and ShackNews confused about the status of Call to Arms. ShackNews noted that the crowdfunding had fallen "far short of its goal".

PC Gamer was skeptical about the crowdfunding, as Digitalmindsoft had raised only 25% of the funds the developer expected, while PC Gamer was optimistic regarding the schedule and thought that the publication of Assault Squad 2 would give financial profit for the company. When Digitalmindsoft announced the game's Steam page and the forthcoming end of the crowdfunding campaign on their website in 2014, Blue's News and GameStar speculated that the game would release when the campaign ended. Blue's News also reported that the release of the game would include backer DLC, while GameStar believed that the game would see full release in 2015, though Digitalmindsoft had not provided a specific release date.

The game was released as early access version on Steam in July 2015. Digitalmindsoft revealed a standard and deluxe edition, "Domination" game mode, play with bots, and a map and mission editor. They also stated that all users who purchased the early access version would have access to the campaigns at release for free. This version included all infantry units, some multiplayer maps, and multiplayer bots, and the replay function. Additional maps, game modes and vehicles were expected to be included after the game's release. Both GameStar and Blue's News believed at the time that the game would be in early access until 2016 Q1.

== Reception ==
=== Pre-release ===
Polygon and PC Gamer named Call to Arms to their top-100 lists of games to-be-released in 2015.
