= Company of Heroes (video game) =

2006 video game

- Developer: Relic Entertainment (Note: Feral Interactive developed and published the mobile and Switch versions of the game; Aspyr developed the Mac OS X port.)
- Publisher: THQ (Note: Originally published by THQ. Publishing rights picked up by Sega in 2013 upon THQ's bankruptcy. Currently self-published by Relic Entertainment after split from Sega.)
- Producer: John Johnson
- Designers: Rob Cunningham; Josh Mosqueira; Quinn Duffy; Erin Daly; Brian Wood
- Programmer: Drew Dunlop
- Artist: Angie Radwan-Pytlewski
- Writers: Duane Pye; Paris Qualles; Adrain Vershinin
- Series: Company of Heroes
- Engine: Essence Engine
- Platforms: Windows; Mac OS X; iPadOS; iOS; Android; Nintendo Switch
- Release: September 11, 2006: Windows; NA: September 11, 2006; AU: September 28, 2006; EU: September 29, 2006 Mac OS X; WW: March 1, 2012 iPadOS; WW: February 13, 2020 Android, iOS; WW: September 9, 2020 Nintendo Switch; WW: October 12, 2023
- Genre: Real-time strategy
- Modes: Single-player, multiplayer

Company of Heroes is a 2006 real-time strategy video game developed by Relic Entertainment and published by THQ for Windows and Mac OS X operating systems. It is the first installment of the Company of Heroes series, and was the first title to make use of the Games for Windows label.

Company of Heroes is set during the Second World War and contains two playable factions. Players aim to capture strategic resource sectors located around the map, which they use to build base structures, produce new units, and defeat their enemies. In the single-player campaign the player commands two U.S. military units during the Battle of Normandy (Operation Overlord) and the liberation of France (Operation Cobra). Depending on the mission, the player controls either Able Company of the 29th Infantry Division's 116th Infantry, or Fox Company of the 101st Airborne Division's 506th PIR.

Company of Heroes received widespread acclaim, winning multiple awards for the best strategy game of the year, and being considered one of the best video games ever made. Two expansions were released: Opposing Fronts in 2007 and Tales of Valor in 2009. A free-to-play massively multiplayer online version of the game, Company of Heroes Online, was briefly released as an open beta in South Korea in April 2010, before being cancelled in March 2011.

An iPad version, developed and published by Feral Interactive, was released in February 2020. A version for Android and iOS mobile devices was released in September 2020. A Nintendo Switch version was released on October 12, 2023.

The success of the game led to a sequel, Company of Heroes 2, which was released in 2013. As of January 2013, the Company of Heroes series has sold more than 4 million copies. A film adaptation, also titled Company of Heroes, was released in 2013. The latest installment in the series, Company of Heroes 3, released in February 2023.

== Gameplay ==
Gameplay screenshot

=== Multiplayer ===
Company of Heroes allows multiplayer matches of 1-8 players via LAN or the Internet. Company of Heroes allows players to fight as both the Allied and Axis forces in multiplayer matches.

For Company of Heroes, developer Relic Entertainment used a new online matchmaking system called Relic Online. Previous Relic games had used GameSpy Arcade or World Opponent Network services. This system includes many features that the previous systems did not have, including a built in automatch and ranking system.

=== Game modes ===
==== Victory Point Control ====
These games focus on controlling several victory points around the middle of the map. These victory points can be captured similarly to strategic points. When one side has more victory points under their control than another, the other side's "points" start to decrease. When one side's counter runs out of points, they lose. Alternatively, the player can simply destroy all enemy structures to win the game. Before the start of the game, the host can choose between 250, 500, or 1000 points. The point function in Company of Heroes works much like the ticket feature in the Battlefield series.

==== Annihilation ====
Annihilation games lack the victory points of the VPC game mode. To win, the player needs to destroy all enemy buildings excluding observation posts on points.

== Plot ==
On June 6, 1944, the US Army's Able Company, under the command of Captain MacKay and Sergeant Conti, storms Dog White sector on Omaha Beach in Normandy. Preceding them is Fox Company, a 101st Airborne unit that drops into Vierville-sur-Mer, secures the roads to Omaha Beach and assaults Carentan. Able relieves Fox as they repel the German counter-attack on Carentan.

The US Army begins its push towards the port city of Cherbourg. In Montebourg, Able Company defends the Red Ball Express convoys from the elite Panzer Lehr Division commanded by a Tiger tank ace named Hauptmann Shultz. Supported by USS Texas and other warships offshore, the company then takes the main harbor of Cherbourg in vicious street fighting. Afterwards, Able Company provides armored support to Fox Company as the paratroopers infiltrate and destroy the V2 launch facility at Sottevast.

The focus shifts towards Operation Cobra and the breakout to Saint-Lô. Able Company captures a bridgehead across the river Vire at Saint-Fromond before fighting through the bocage to take Hill 192 outside Saint-Lô. The German garrison in Saint-Lô is encircled and defeated, but the Panzer Lehr escapes. While the US Army Air Forces carpet bomb much of the Panzer Lehr, Able Company's M10 tank destroyers mop up its remaining Panther tanks at Hébécrevon. Shultz evades the American attack, killing Captain MacKay with a parting shot from his Tiger tank.

Able Company is taken off the frontline to garrison Hill 317 outside Mortain, with Conti given command and a field promotion to lieutenant. However, a German armored counter-attack strikes at Mortain; Able defends the hill until relieved and retakes Mortain. The Germans begin to withdraw from Normandy, and Able attacks one escape route at Autry, destroying Shultz and his remaining Tiger tanks with a Pershing tank. By August 19, the German 7th Army is almost encircled in the Falaise pocket. With support from the Air Force, Able Company links with Canadian and Polish forces at Chambois and crushes the German escape, ending the Normandy campaign. A postscript notes that Able Company sustained an 80 percent casualty rate by the end of the war, although Conti survived.

== Development ==
An M10 Wolverine and American troops in the Essence Engine

Company of Heroes is Relic's first title to use its Essence Engine, which allows various graphical effects, including high dynamic range lighting, dynamic lighting and shadows, advanced shader effects, and normal mapping. The game was in development for more than 3 years. At its peak, more than 100 people worked on the game.

Company of Heroes also uses the Havok physics engine, giving it a more realistic physics system than previous RTS games. Parts of buildings can be destroyed by grenades, satchels, or mortars, and tanks can drive through sections of walls or other barriers. Smoke created from explosions behaves realistically as possible, including its behavior in wind. Debris is also influenced by explosions; a blast can send barrels flying and shower troops in dirt, while leaving behind a large crater. When infantry are bombarded by artillery, body parts sometimes detach and are dispersed over, and some units are thrown about in the immediate area. Bridges and buildings can be destroyed by engineers using demolitions.

Relic released the Company of Heroes patch v1.70 in May 2007, which included a new DirectX 10 rendering mode with better terrain, more world objects, and improved shadows and lighting. This patch made Company of Heroes the first commercial video game to support Direct3D 10.

== Expansions ==
=== Opposing Fronts ===
Company of Heroes: Opposing Fronts is a standalone expansion pack. It contains two factions; the British Second Army and the Panzer Lehr Division (German Panzer Elite). Owners of Opposing Fronts are able to play against owners of Company of Heroes and vice versa, although only using the armies from the game they own. Owners of both games are able to play all four armies in multiplayer. Opposing Fronts was released on September 24, 2007. It was later re-released along with Company of Heroes as Company of Heroes Gold and later as part of the Company of Heroes Anthology (together with Tales of Valor).

=== Tales of Valor ===
Company of Heroes: Tales of Valor is a standalone expansion pack. It was released on April 8, 2009.

== Reception ==
Company of Heroes received a "Silver" sales award from the Entertainment and Leisure Software Publishers Association (ELSPA), indicating sales of at least 100,000 copies in the United Kingdom.

=== Reviews ===
Reception

Aggregate scores
Aggregator	Score
GameRankings	PC: 94%
Metacritic	PC: 93/100 iOS: 86/100

Review scores
Publication	Score
1Up.com	A+
Eurogamer	10/10
GameSpot	9.0/10
GameSpy	5/5
GamesRadar+	10/10
IGN	9.4/10
TouchArcade	4.5/5

Awards
Publication	Award
IGN	(2006) PC Game of the Year
GameSpy	(2006) PC Game of the Year

Upon its release the game received wide critical acclaim. On the review aggregator GameRankings, the game had an average score of 94% based on 57 reviews – making it the fourteenth highest rated PC game of 2006. On Metacritic, the game had an average score of 93 out of 100 based on 55 critic reviews – considered "universal acclaim" by the site.

In June 2011, the game was ranked #51 on IGN's Top 100 Modern Games. Edge ranked the game #30 on its list of "The 100 Best Games To Play Today", stating: "From its lofty perch above an RTS battlefield, Relic gets to the heart of WWII, turning the genre's plusses and minuses into salvation and sacrifice. If only the same could be said of countless first person shooters".

=== Awards ===
- PC Gamer: Game of the Year 2006
- GameSpy: PC Game of 2006, Best Sound, Best PC Strategy Game, Best PC Multiplayer
- Satellite Awards: Outstanding Puzzle/Strategy Game
- GameSpot: Best PC Game 2006, Best Strategy Game
- IGN: PC Game of 2006, Best PC Strategy Game, Best Use of Sound on PC, Best Online PC game
- Game Critics Awards: Best Strategy Game
- GameSpot: 2005 Best PC Game of Show; Best Strategy Game of Show; Best Overall Game of Show
- IGN: Runner-up, Best Strategy Game (PC), Runner-up, Technological Excellence (PC)
- GameSpy: Best of E3
- Mod DB Hall of Fame: Two modifications, Europe in Ruins (2007) and Company of Heroes: Eastern Front (2010), have each earned a spot in the Mod DB Hall of Fame.

The editors of Computer Games Magazine named Company of Heroes the overall best computer game of 2006, and presented it with their special awards for "Best Strategy Game", "Best Sound Effects", "Best Multiplayer" and "Best Voice Acting". They summarized it as "an ideal real-time strategy game", and as "a perfect storm of visuals, sound, and gameplay". During the 10th Annual Interactive Achievement Awards, the Academy of Interactive Arts & Sciences awarded Company of Heroes with "Strategy Game of the Year", along with receiving nominations for "Computer Game of the Year", and outstanding achievement in "Game Design", "Gameplay Engineering", "Sound Design", and "Visual Engineering".
