= Alexander Zorich =

Pen name of a Russo-Ukrainian writer duo

Alexander Zorich (Russian: Александр Зорич)
- Born: 1973 (age 52–53); Kharkiv
- Writing career
- Genres: Science-fiction, Fantasy, alternate history

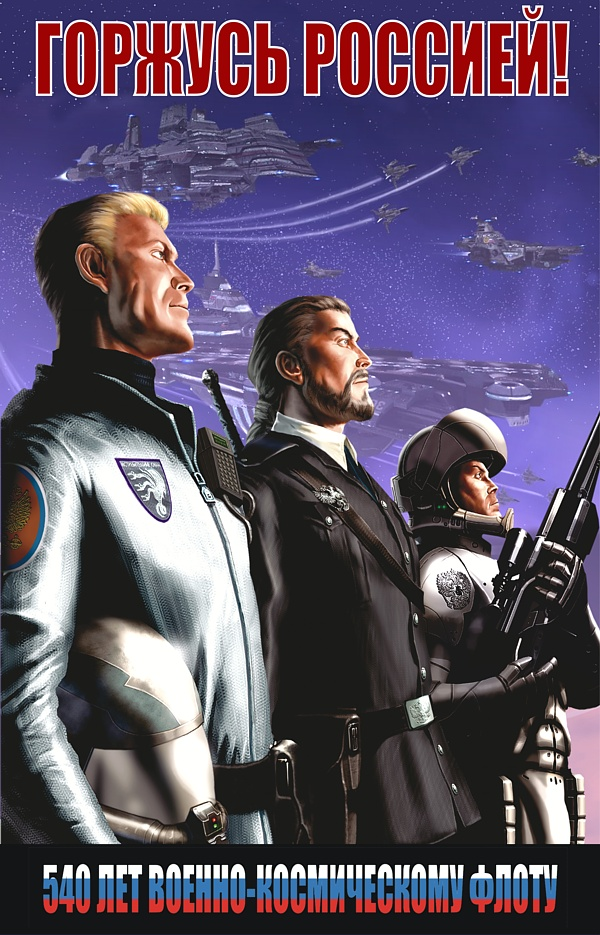
A propaganda poster is an illustration for Alexander Zorich's series of science fiction novels, "The Sphere of the Great Race," also known as "The Universe of Tomorrow War."

Alexander Zorich is the collective pen name of two Russo-Ukrainian writers; Yana Botsman and Dmitry Gordevsky. The two write in Russian, in genres such as science fiction, fantasy and alternate history, as well as PC game scenarios.

== Yana Botsman ==
Yana Botsman was born on August 7, 1973. She has a master's degree in applied mathematics and a Ph.D. in philosophy (1999, thesis on philosophy of Buddhism). She worked as an assistant professor in Kharkiv National University (Philosophical Faculty) until September 2004, when she became a full-time writer and scenarist. Yana is married.

== Dmitry Gordevsky ==
Dmitry Gordevsky was born on March 21, 1973. He has a master's degree in mathematics and a Ph.D. in philosophy (2000, thesis on philosophy of medieval heresies). He worked as an assistant professor in Kharkiv State University (Philosophical Faculty) until 2004, but in September of that year became a full-time writer and scenarist. Dmitry is unmarried.

== Facts ==
As Alexander Zorich, Yana Botsman and Dmitry Gordevsky are the authors of 18 novels, and are very popular in Russia. Yana and Dmitry have been writing together since 1991, when they were both first-year university students. "Alexander Zorich" has been described as "the most venerable among young writers, or maybe the youngest among venerable Russian writers" (Nasha Fantastika Magazine).

The first book by Alexander Zorich has never been published.

"It was a huge (about 150 pages), epic poem about fantasy world of Sarmontazara. And we worked on it for about two years. From our present-day point of view, it is absolutely terrible. But back then we both were confident, that it is much more ingenious than all the Shakespeare's writings. Readers often ask us, when will we publish it. The only answer we can give is "Never!" (from an interview to "Zerkalo Nedeli" weekly).

The first published book by Alexander Zorich The Sign of Destruction was published in 1997 and rapidly gained popularity among fans of fantasy worlds. A historic novel Charles the Duke, dedicated to Charles the Bold, last Duke of Burgundy, gained the title "Best Russian Fiction of 2001" by the "Ex-Libris" book review (Moscow).

Over the years Alexander Zorich has published many verses and short stories in small literature magazines. The first large novel by Alexander Zorich saw the light of the day in 1997. Since then Zorich has released seven fantasy novels (The Sign of Destruction, The Seed of Wind, The Ways of Starborned, Love and Rule, You Win, The Combat Vehicle of Love, The Light of Nighttime), one cyberpunk novel (The Season of Weapon), the book in the genre of alternate history and its sequel (Charles the Duke, The First Sword of Burgundy), four "classic" science fiction novels (The Consul of Commonwealth and the Tomorrow War trilogy), two fairy tales (Denis Kotik, two related books), one story's collection (Nothing Sacred) and one "cryptohistory" novel (Roman Star) dedicated to Publius Ovidius Naso. In fact, the only fiction genre Alexander Zorich has never worked in is the horror genre.

The Tomorrow War trilogy (Tomorrow War, With No Mercy, Moscow Time) brought Zorich the biggest success in the writers' bibliography and became a standard of modern Russian space opera. The books of Alexander Zorich are being published by the largest publishing houses in Russia, among them EKSMO and AST (Moscow), Centerpolygraph (Moscow) and Severo-Zapad (Saint-Petersburg). Alexander Zorich actively cooperates with the leading Russian fantasy & SF magazines, including "Mir Fantastiki" ("The World of SF&F"), "Esli" ("If"), "Polden" ("Noon"), "Zvezdnaya Doroga" ("Star Trek"), "Nasha Fantastika" ("Our Fiction"), etc.

Several novels and stories by Alexander Zorich have been translated into Ukrainian and Polish.

== Books ==
- The Ways of Starborned trilogy (Fantasy. Editions: 1997—1998, EKSMO; 2001 Centerpolygraph; 2006 AST-press)
  1. The Sign of Destruction
  2. The Seed of Wind
  3. The Ways of Starborned
- The Vault of Equilibrium tetralogy (Fantasy. Editions: 1998, EKSMO — vol.1; 2000—2001 Centerpolygraph; 2006 AST-press)
  1. Love and Rule
  2. You Win
  3. The Combat Vehicle of Love
  4. The Light of Nighttime
- Season of the Weapon novel Cyberpunk (Editions: 2001 Centerpolygraph; 2000 Severo-Zapad Press/AST-press; 2006 AST-press)
- Charles the Duke alternate history dilogy (Editions: 2001 Centerpolygraph)
  1. Charles the Duke
  2. The First Sword of Burgundy
- Consul of Commonwealth novel (SF. Editions: 2002 Centerpolygraph; 2007 AST-press)
- Tomorrow War trilogy (SF. Editions: 2003—2006 AST-press)
  1. The Tomorrow War
  2. Without Mercy
  3. Moscow Time
- Denis Kotik dilogy (Fairy tales. Editions: 2003—2004 AST-press; 2007 EKSMO)
  1. Denis Kotik and Queen of Winged Horses
  2. Denis Kotik and Pale Knights Order
- Roman Star novel (cryptohistory. Editions: 2007 AST-press)

== PC games scenarios ==
- Soldiers: Heroes of World War II – Russian title "V tilu vraga" (World War II RTS. Studio: Best Way, Ukraine, Severodonetsk. Release: 2004; Russian publisher 1C, international publisher Codemasters)
- Faces of War – Russian title "V tilu vraga 2" (World War II RTS. Studio: Best Way, Ukraine, Severodonetsk. Release: 2006; Russian publisher 1C, international publisher Ubisoft)
- Tomorrow war – Russian title "Zavtra voina" (Space simulator depicting space warfare in the 27th century. Studio: Crioland, Russia, Novosibirsk. Release: 2006; Russian publisher 1C, international publisher Atari)
- Tomorrow war: K Factor – Russian title "Zavtra voina: Faktor K" (Space simulator depicting space warfare in the 27th century. Studio: Crioland, Russia, Novosibirsk. Release: 2007; Russian publisher 1C, international publisher Atari (?))
- The Vault of Equilibrium: Beltion – Russian title "Svod Ravnovesiya: Beltion" (RPG focusing on the magic inquisition of the Varan Republic. Studio: Rostok-Games, Ukraine, Kyiv. Release: 2009; Russian publisher Novij Disk)
- Men of War: Red Tide – Russian title "Chernye bushlaty" (World War II RTS. Studio: 1C, Russia, Moscow. Release: 2009; Russian publisher 1C)

== Note ==
1. Tomorrow war/Tomorrow war: K Factor games based on Alexander Zorich space opera trilogy with the same name.
2. The Vault: Beltion Project based on Alexander Zorich fantasy tetralogy «The Vault of Equilibrium».
