= Company of Heroes: Tales of Valor =

2009 video game

- Developer: Relic Entertainment
- Publishers: THQ (Initial); Sega (Online services: 2013-)
- Designers: Brian R. Wood; Josh Mosqueira
- Programmers: Remy Saville; Ryan Haksi
- Artists: Nicholas Carota; Ian Guise
- Engine: Essence Engine; Havok (Physics engine)
- Platforms: Microsoft Windows, OS X
- Release: April 9, 2009
- Genre: Real-time strategy
- Modes: Single-player, multiplayer

Company of Heroes: Tales of Valor is a real-time strategy video game stand-alone expansion pack to Company of Heroes. It was released on April 9, 2009.

== Gameplay ==
Tales of Valor includes new units, additional maps, and further multiplayer modes, such as 'Stonewall', where the player commands a small number of troops against waves of increasingly difficult enemies, and a feature called "direct-fire", where the player 'Points and shoots' (seen in Soldiers: Heroes of WWII, Faces of War and Men of War).

=== Rewards ===
The game offers special units as rewards for completing a campaign and can be used to replace certain deployable units in multiplayer games. For the Allies, the US faction receives the M18 Hellcat and T17 armored car, while players using the British faction get the Kangaroo carrier and the Staghound (T17E1) armored car. Wehrmacht players can make use of the Schwimmwagen Type 166, the H39 Geschützwagen (a conversion of captured Hotchkiss H39 tanks into light self-propelled tank destroyers), and Voss' special Tiger I, while the Panzer Elite will receive the Schwimmwagen Type 139 and the Hotchkiss H35.

== Plot ==
Company of Heroes: Tales Of Valor has three single-player episodes.

- Tiger Ace — This campaign is inspired by the historical exploits of Tiger Ace SS-Hauptsturmführer Michael Wittmann in Normandy. Set in Villers-Bocage, the narrative is a backstory of Kampfgruppe Lehr commander Major-General Maximillian Voss and Hauptmann Josef Schultz from the original. In the campaign, the two are members of a Tiger I tank crew as they penetrate the town. They are forced to abandon the tank when it is immobilized by an anti-tank gun and try to escape British forces in the area. The tank crew returns the following day in one of two new Tigers, spearheading a Panzergrenadier assault on the town. In the end, it is revealed that Voss was promoted to major-general and sent to Holland, setting the stage for the Opposing Fronts campaign. Schultz stayed in France and died during the defense of Autry.
- Causeway — Follows a company of paratroopers of the 82nd Airborne Division as they try to secure the La Fiere causeway for other Allied forces to pass through the Normandy beaches. The campaign focuses on Sgt. Wilson and Sgt. Frank Craft. After the 82nd's airdrop goes badly, Wilson's Able Squad links up with Baker Squad and assembles paratroopers to send to the town of Cauqigny. After the two squads take Chef du Pont on the other side of the causeway, the paratroopers at Cauquigny fall back due to heavy German resistance. The airborne forces retake the town and Wilson is run down by a German tank. As the Army's tank units head south from the beaches, the airborne units, headed by Craft, engage the German forces. Able and Baker find and destroy the tank that killed Wilson as they assault a castle complex near the causeway. The ending cutscene reveals that Craft later participated in Operation Market Garden, where he dies in the successful defense of a bridge over the Meuse (Maas).
- Falaise Pocket — The campaign features a mixed unit of Waffen-SS and Wehrmacht troops stationed in the town of Trun. Because of an artillery strike over nearby Chambois, the Germans figured that both towns must be held to allow the other units of the Seventh Army to escape the Falaise Pocket, resulting in several intense battles along the riverfront of Trun. The ending cutscene states that about 10,000 Germans were killed and 40,000 captured.

== Operations ==
The expansion pack introduces three new multiplayer game modes:

- Assault: Similar to the Warcraft 3 mod Defense of the Ancients, with 3 members per team. They choose 7 "Heroes" each different in their Offensive, Defensive, and Support abilities. Ranging from a Pioneer/Engineer to Paratroopers/Recon, the goal of the game is to destroy the enemy's base, which requires the player to fight through three separate lines of defense. Protected by mortar firing bunkers, these also act as the Player Respawn point. By destroying each bunker the player is able to progress closer towards the enemy headquarters. Once the gas tanks inside a base have been blown, the team that destroyed them wins and the game ends.
- Stonewall: 4 players are the defenders of a small town, defending against 16 waves of enemy attacks. Allies players face waves of Axis attacks progressing from a small band of Volksgrenadier to the mighty Tiger tanks; Axis players defend against waves ranging from Riflemen to M26 Pershing tanks. There are always four critical buildings in the town: the Church, that automatically heals units next to it; the Garage that repairs all allies' vehicles; the bank that gives a boost in manpower; and finally the Manor that gives an increase in population cap. The 4 players must work together in order to defend the town, as the team in Relic designed it.
- Panzerkrieg (tank war): Similar to Assault, with the "Hero" units being replaced by tanks. The Axis Team can procure 3 tanks: the Hotchkiss, a small mobile tank hunter, the Panzer IV, the all-around tank, and the Panther tank, which specializes in head-on armor conflicts. The Allies have the M18 Hellcat, a mobile tank hunter, a Sherman tank that is meant to counter the Panzer IV, and the Churchill tank, which is the answer to the Panther.

== Reception ==
Reception

Aggregate score
Aggregator	Score
Metacritic	70/100

Review scores
Publication	Score
Eurogamer	7/10
Game Informer	7.5/10
GameSpy	3.5/5

The reception of Company of Heroes: Tales of Valor was mixed. Many reviewers were confused as to what the game had to offer. Most of the reviewers appeared to brand the game as average and gave it a rating of around 70%, citing that the game had some interesting features and gameplay modes, but only a short campaign and no new armies to command.
