= Admiral Sea Battles =

1996 video game

- Developer: Meridian'93
- Publisher: Megamedia
- Designers: Dmytro Prokopov, Andrii Doroshchuk
- Programmer: Andrii Doroshchuk et al.
- Artists: Dmytro Prokopov, Viktor Sylak
- Writer: Dmytro Prokopov
- Composer: Andrii Vasylenko
- Platform: Microsoft Windows
- Release: NA: 30 September 1996
- Genre: Turn-based strategy
- Modes: Single-player, multiplayer

Admiral Sea Battles is a turn-based strategy game for personal computers running Microsoft Windows, developed by the Luhansk-based studio Meridian'93 and published by Megamedia on 30 September 1996. Gameplay focuses on naval battles in the Age of Sail. It became the first video game developed in independent Ukraine.

== Gameplay ==
The game is set during the Age of Sail. Gameplay focuses on naval battles, and contains little in the way of global strategic or economic systems, functioning primarily as a turn-based tactical game, although players may construct forts and ports to repair ships.

The game includes 18 missions, evenly divided into three campaigns. In the first campaign, the player must establish a foothold in enemy territory and assist allies in repelling attacks; in the second, reclaim gold stolen by pirates; and in the third, expand presence in conquered territories by constructing new naval bases.

At the start of each mission, the player is given victory conditions. For example, players must protect transport ships and explore surrounding areas for enemy fleets or coastal forts. Battles may occur at sea or onboard ships between crew members; in the latter case, outcomes are largely determined by numerical superiority. Missions are completed using a fleet assembled from various types of ships, ranging from small, fast vessels to massive warships. There are 11 classes of sailing ships from different historical eras. Before starting a campaign, players may select any combination of these ships. Only these ships remain available throughout the campaign, requiring careful management to prevent their destruction. At the start of the game, players may predefine ship positions and issue orders. Units follow these commands automatically, though players may intervene during combat to adjust individual actions. Currents and storms are present, ships may be blown off course, and can even sink in severe weather.

Multiplayer gameplay is available via Internet or LAN connections.

== Development ==
Dmytro Prokopov developed the game concept, wrote the scenario, and worked on graphics. Programmer Andrii Doroshchuk also contributed to the concept, while Viktor Sylak assisted with graphics. Music was composed by Andrii Vasylenko. All later worked on the studio's subsequent projects: Ancient Conquest and Submarine Titans. Doroshchuk, Sylak, and two other programmers, Hryhorii Pidhirnyi and Artem Kulakov, later joined The Creative Assembly Australia, contributing to Medieval II: Total War and Stormrise.

The game became the first commercial video game developed in independent Ukraine.

== Reception ==
Reception

Review scores
Publication	Score
Computer Gaming World	2/5
GameSpot	4.9/10
Świat Gier Komputerowych	6/10

The game received mixed critical reviews but was commercially successful. It sold poorly in the United States, but was popular in Germany, Japan, South Korea, and Taiwan.

In his review, Tim McDonald of GameSpot offers a largely negative assessment of Admiral: Sea Battles, arguing that its strong initial presentation fails to compensate for weak gameplay. While he praises the game's graphics, interface, cutscenes, and variety of ship types, he states that these strengths quickly give way to frustration once play begins. The game's depiction of Age of Sail naval warfare is described as thematically appealing but poorly realized in practice. McDonald criticizes the game's extremely slow pacing, repetitive combat mechanics, and lack of meaningful tactical options. Naval battles and boarding actions are characterized as simplistic, relying largely on predetermined outcomes rather than strategic decision-making. He also notes that missions are excessively difficult and structured more like rigid puzzles than open-ended challenges, requiring repeated trial and error rather than thoughtful planning. The absence of standalone scenarios and the reliance on lengthy campaigns further exacerbate these issues. Overall, the review concludes that Admiral: Sea Battles offers insufficient depth and engagement to justify its ambitions, and recommends that players interested in naval strategy look elsewhere.

The game was reviewed for Computer Gaming World. In his review, Bob Proctor evaluates the game as a technically competent but strategically unsatisfying naval strategy title. He describes the core gameplay as centered on economic management, with players building ships, ports, and forts across fixed maps whose geography encourages specific tactical choke points. While the game offers multiple maps and ship types, Proctor emphasizes that success depends primarily on managing money, since ships can be built or lost in a single turn and financial collapse quickly leads to defeat. The reviewer is critical of the game's abstraction of naval warfare, arguing that historical Age of Sail tactics are not only irrelevant but counterproductive. Combat mechanics, weather effects, and boarding actions are described as ahistorical and arbitrary, reducing engagements to puzzle-like solutions rather than strategic decision-making. In single-player mode, the predictable artificial intelligence and reliance on favorable wind conditions contribute to frustration, reinforcing the view that the game functions more as a sequence of difficult puzzles than a true strategy simulation. Additional criticisms include a clumsy user interface, minimal documentation, and the absence of features such as fog of war. Despite these shortcomings, Proctor acknowledges that the game is solidly programmed and finds it passable as a two-player experience via network, modem, or email. He concludes that Admiral: Sea Battles may appeal to players seeking a simple, competitive conquest game against human opponents, but does not recommend it for solo play or for players interested in historically grounded naval strategy.

The game was also reviewed for Świat Gier Komputerowych #51. The review assesses Admiral: Sea Battles as an ambitious but ultimately flawed attempt at an eighteenth-century naval strategy game. It praises the game's presentation, particularly its high-resolution graphics, clear interface, accessible controls, and atmospheric introduction, noting that the basic mechanics—fleet movement, ship construction, and turn-based naval combat—are easy to learn and visually appealing. The variety of ship types and the influence of wind direction on movement are also highlighted as positive elements. However, the reviewer criticizes the game for excessive simplification, arguing that its mechanics reduce naval warfare to a board game-like experience. Weather effects are described as overly limited, and naval battles are characterized as repetitive exchanges of fire with little tactical depth. Boarding actions are likewise seen as relying primarily on crew numbers rather than morale, experience, or tactical choices. Despite the game's high difficulty level, the reviewer suggests this challenge does not stem from strategic complexity. Overall, the review concludes that while Admiral: Sea Battles may appeal to players who enjoy simple, abstract naval games, it fails to deliver the depth expected of a true naval strategy title, and gives it a score of 6/10.

In a Polish review in CD-Action, Admiral: Sea Battles is praised as a highly engaging naval strategy game that successfully fulfills long-standing expectations for large-scale age-of-sail combat. The reviewer contrasts it favorably with earlier titles such as Pirates!, highlighting its ability to depict fleet actions, fortifications, and coastal domination rather than limiting combat to single-ship duels. The game's turn-based, grid-based system is commended for allowing careful planning, while the inclusion of eleven ship types, ports, and two kinds of forts adds strategic depth. The review positively describes the game's intuitive interface, flexible on-screen controls, and largely mouse-driven gameplay, which make it accessible despite some unconventional design choices, such as allowing each ship to move only once per turn. Naval combat is described as satisfying and visually clear, with damage visibly reflected in ships’ appearance. Weather mechanics, particularly wind and storms, are singled out as one of the more realistic elements, significantly affecting movement and combat effectiveness. While acknowledging several simplifications—such as limiting ships to a single broadside per turn, combat strength being tied primarily to displacement rather than maneuverability, and a historically imprecise mix of ship eras—the reviewer argues these compromises improve playability and accessibility. Overall, Admiral: Sea Battles is characterized as an absorbing and enjoyable strategy game that may disappoint realism purists but merits high praise for its gameplay, atmosphere, and entertainment value.

The reviewer for the Polish magazine Gambler awarded it the score of 65%.

The game was also reviewed in numerous other magazines in several countries, such as Computer Games Strategy Plus, PC Action, Hacker (a Croatian magazine), Micromania, PC Player,

== Sequel ==
Following the success of their debut project, the studio began work on a conceptual sequel titled Admiral: Ancient Ships, announced in 1997. The gameplay shifted from turn-based to real-time strategy. The game was eventually released as Ancient Conquest (1999).
