= Men of War: Red Tide =

2009 video game

- Developer: 1C Entertainment
- Publishers: 1C Company; 505 Games; Aspyr Media
- Series: Men of War
- Engine: GEM 2
- Platforms: Cloud (OnLive); Microsoft Windows
- Release: November 1, 2009
- Genres: Real-time strategy and real-time tactics
- Mode: Single-player

Men of War: Red Tide (Russian: Чёрные бушлаты, or Black Jackets) is a real-time strategy and real-time tactics video game and expansion pack to the game Men of War, developed in partnership with Best Way by Digitalmindsoft and published by 1C Company. Game concept and scenario are elaborated by Alexander Zorich, modern Russian writer and scenarist. The game's single player focuses on the Soviet Naval Infantry of the Black Sea Fleet during the Crimean campaign. The arsenals of two more countries, Italy and Romania, are also introduced to the series.

== Gameplay ==
Most of the gameplay features from the first Men Of War were reused in Red Tide, with several small bug fixes and tweaks to make it more enjoyable. In campaign mode, missions are generally longer and more difficult than the ones in its predecessor.

The Soviet Union is the only playable faction in campaign mode. Other factions (Italy, Germany and Romania) can be used in the editor. The editor is only accessible through some work with the games files. Red Tide does not include a multiplayer mode however. The game features one of the largest campaigns in the series with a total of 28 missions divided into 6 campaigns. There is also a large historical encyclopedia with information on the Black Sea Fleet and the battles for Odessa, Sevastopol, etc.

== Plot ==
The game is divided into 6 campaigns. Each mission represents 1 or several battles and starts with an intro to the scene. The first mission of the campaign also has an intro informing the player of the historical situation.

- Campaign I: Odessa Must be Ours
- Campaign II: The Crimean Offensive
- Campaign III: Manstein's Big Guns
- Campaign IV: Breaching the Blue Line
- Campaign V: Company of Heroes
- Campaign VI: The Black Sea is Ours

== Reception ==
Reception

Aggregate score
Aggregator	Score
Metacritic	77/100

Men of War: Red Tide has received "mixed or average" reviews from critics, according to the review aggregation website Metacritic. GameShark gave it a score of 50, stating that while the "solo game is decent", it loses its edge without the multiplayer ability. Jim Rossignol of Rock, Paper, Shotgun had praised the voice acting in the game.
