= Men of War: Assault Squad 2 =

2014 video game

- Developer: Digitalmindsoft
- Publisher: 1C Company
- Series: Men of War
- Engine: GEM 2
- Platform: Microsoft Windows
- Release: May 15, 2014
- Genres: Real-time tactics, real-time strategy
- Modes: Single-player, multiplayer

Men of War: Assault Squad 2 (Russian: В тылу врага 2: Штурм 2, or Behind Enemy Lines 2: Assault 2) is a real-time tactics and real-time strategy game set in World War II. It is a sequel to the 2011 game Men of War: Assault Squad. The game was released on May 15, 2014.

Men of War: Assault Squad 2 features single player skirmish modes that take players from large scale tank combat to sniper stealth missions.

== Expansions ==
Men of War Origins is a downloadable content developed by Digitalmindsoft. It is a modern remaster of the original Men of War, and was released on August 25, 2016.

Cold War is a standalone expansion. It includes for the first time dynamic campaign for the single-player and co-op mode and the usual multiplayer modes. It received generally unfavorable reviews, and holds an average of 41/100 on aggregate web site Metacritic.

== Reception ==
Reception

Aggregate score
Aggregator	Score
Metacritic	68/100

Review score
Publication	Score
PC Gamer (US)	75/100

Men of War: Assault Squad 2 has received "mixed or average" reviews, according to reviews aggregator Metacritic, garnering a score of 68/100.

PC Gamer US gave the game a score of 75/100, praising its difficulty.
