= Company of Heroes 2 =

Real-time strategy video game

- Developer: Relic Entertainment
- Publishers: SEGA (2013-2025); Feral Interactive (Linux, OS X) (Note: Originally published by Sega. Currently self-published by Relic Entertainment after split from Sega.); Relic Entertainment (2025-present)
- Director: Quinn Duffy
- Producer: Greg Willson
- Programmer: Remy Saville
- Artists: Geoff Coates; Ian Guise; Brett Pascal; Dave Chambers
- Writers: John Cappozi; Paul De Meo; Haris Orkin
- Composer: Cris Velasco
- Engine: Essence Engine 3.0
- Platforms: Windows, Linux, OS X
- Release: Windows: WW: June 25, 2013; Linux, OS X August 27, 2015
- Genre: Real-time strategy
- Modes: Single-player, multiplayer

Company of Heroes 2 is a real-time strategy video game developed by Relic Entertainment and published by Sega for Windows, Linux, and OS X. It is the sequel to the 2006 game Company of Heroes. As with the original Company of Heroes, the game is set in World War II but with the focus on the Eastern Front, with players primarily controlling the side of the Soviet Red Army during various stages of the Eastern Front, from Operation Barbarossa to the Battle of Berlin. Company of Heroes 2 runs on Relic Entertainment's proprietary Essence 3.0 game engine.

In January 2013, Sega acquired Relic Entertainment and along with it the Company of Heroes intellectual property from THQ. The game was released on June 25 in North America and Europe.

A sequel, Company of Heroes 3, was released in February 2023.

== Gameplay ==
=== Resources ===
The resource-generation system from the first game has been modified. Players will still capture specific flagged points all over the map to collect munitions and fuel credits, which will be invested in assembling their units. Most armies can construct caches to increase the fuel or munitions income from these points, though some points produce a higher income of one material but cannot have caches built on them. Instead of the soldier units actually gathering at the flagged point itself, capturing the point is possible if the player's units are inside a specific zone with no enemy units in the same zone. The accumulation of these resources and the size of the player's army can be much faster if players capture various flagged points all over the map. In order for a player to receive the benefits of a captured flagged point, it must be part of a continuous area of captured territory, thus allowing an unbroken chain ("supply line") connected to the headquarters. Thus, the resource intake will be curtailed if the opposing side captures territory that isolates ("cuts off") owned points from other allied sections in the map. Manpower is used to build common units, and the amount will decrease the larger a player's army grows.

=== Buildings ===
Units can occupy a civilian building and use it as a temporary strongpoint. However, the occupants can be flushed out through attacks by artillery or soldiers using flamethrowers and grenades. The building-damage system from Company of Heroes is retained and enhanced; wooden buildings set afire will continue burning until they are reduced to cinders. Furthermore, buildings can be damaged by tanks and light vehicles driving into them. The Soviets' main structure is the Regimental Field Headquarters, which is used to produce conscripts and field engineers. The Special Rifle Command, Support Weapon Kampaneya, Mechanized Armor Kampaneya, and the Tankoviy Battalion Command are the respective Soviet equivalents of the original game's barracks, weapons support center, vehicle center, and tank hall. A field hospital can help treat seriously injured soldiers. The Wehrmacht's main structure is the Kampfgruppe Headquarters, which is used to produce pioneers and MG42 Heavy Machine Gun teams and to upgrade battle phases to allow for more advanced units and structures.

=== Combat mechanics ===
Combat includes controllable units that are recruited and ordered directly by the player (through the user interface at player-controlled buildings, or through a doctrine ability), as well as activated support actions, such as artillery bombardment or air cover suppression. Every controllable unit type, whether infantry or vehicle, has an associated construction cost and recruitment time, as well as a range of fighting abilities. Vehicles and infantry can eventually be upgraded by purchasing specific capabilities. Upgrades generally improve the unit's effectiveness. Some upgrades are global, granting immediate benefits to all deployed units, while others must be purchased on a unit-by-unit basis. Most combat takes place through direct, line-of-sight engagements. As with the original Company of Heroes, colored dots will show locations that provide varying degrees of cover for soldiers and support units. Soldiers can also climb over low terrain obstacles such as fences and walls while vehicles, depending on their type, can simply smash through obstacles. Occasionally if a vehicle takes too much damage, it will be abandoned rather than destroyed; the crew is killed but the vehicle remains mostly intact. Abandoned vehicles can be repaired by engineer units and recovered or captured by sending an infantry squad of sufficient size to crew it, or they could be destroyed by collateral fire to deny them to the enemy. The game also offers the player a chance to complete side quests in a mission, which are denoted by an inverted triangle icon.

=== TrueSight ===
The game's Essence 3.0 engine introduces a new line-of-sight feature called the TrueSight system, which aims to better emulate troop visibility in real combat. In contrast to overhead visibility seen in other strategy games, TrueSight more accurately represents a unit's visibility range based on environmental conditions and type of unit.

=== Weather ===
Weather conditions are a major factor in Company of Heroes 2's gameplay, under the new ColdTech weather-simulation system. Since many battles in the Eastern Front occurred in winter weather, troops can die of frostbite if caught in the outside during severe weather, especially when pinned by enemy fire; a thermometer-shaped bar to the left side of the unit icon denotes a soldier's body temperature. The soldiers can recover their body heat if they are close to a bonfire or have found a building to shelter in, though soldiers in cover outside will not lose or gain body heat. Players moving through deep snow will move at a reduced speed unless they are on a road; their footprints are also visible to the enemy. Certain maps have frozen bodies of water, allowing for more movement options. However, players face the danger of being attacked from the other side; as a result, the ice can buckle under the weight of the units in movement or shattered by explosions.

=== Theatre of War ===
The game introduces the "Theatre of War", a series of single-player and cooperative missions detailing various aspects of the Eastern Front campaign from both German and Soviet sides. Eighteen missions set in 1941 will be part of the game upon release with the missions from 1942 onward available as downloadable content. The first of these offerings is Case Blue, a package only free to pre-ordered copies and Red Star editions of the game, featuring the Axis forces during the Fall Blau campaign on the Eastern Front. Later releases include Victory at Stalingrad, taking place around the city of Stalingrad during 1942, and Southern Fronts, focusing on events surrounding the spring rasputitsa in 1943.

=== Order 227 ===
Company of Heroes 2's campaign attempts to tackle Joseph Stalin's Order No. 227, which prohibits retreating except under the direction of senior officers. Starting from the fifth mission set in Stalingrad, Order 227 will be in effect if the player deploys Fresh Conscripts, Frontovik Squads, or Penal Battalions. A time bar appears on the left side of the map display; for that duration, players must not have their soldiers go into full retreat back to headquarters or else said soldiers will be executed for doing so.

== Plot ==
In a Siberian gulag in 1952, NKVD Colonel Churkin interrogates his former subordinate officer, Lieutenant Lev Abramovich Isakovich, about his journal detailing his experiences during the Great Patriotic War. Throughout, Churkin questions Isakovich's commitment to the Soviet cause, while Isakovich bemoans Churkin's ease with sacrificing Soviet lives.

Isakovich recalls his first meeting with Churkin at the outset of Operation Barbarossa, employing scorched earth tactics to hold back the German advance on Moscow, leading a counterattack at Mtsensk and skirmishing with German troops through the harsh winter. Isakovich's unit is redeployed to Stalingrad, where he holds that the only thing driving the Soviets was Order 227. Near the end of the battle, his men abandon the line to rescue Isakovich after he is trapped in a collapsed building. As punishment, the men are executed and Isakovich is reassigned as a war correspondent.

While recuperating from his injuries, Isakovich hears the story of the Siege of Leningrad and relief efforts in Operation Iskra. He then embeds with Soviet troops assaulting Orsha and Lublin, uncovering the Majdanek concentration camp. After reporting on the execution of Home Army partisans considered a threat to future Soviet rule in Poland, Isakovich is embedded to a penal battalion by Churkin. There, he witnesses the Battle of Poznań, the destruction of the German Ninth Army at the Battle of Halbe and ultimately the final Battle of Berlin.

Isakovich tries to defect to show the world the true nature of the Eastern Front but is captured and sent to the gulag. Having concluded the interrogation, Churkin kills a guard and allows Isakovich to escape with the journal; Churkin had discovered he was not to survive Joseph Stalin's next purge. As Isakovich escapes, Churkin commits suicide.

== Development ==
THQ first announced the sequel to the acclaimed Company of Heroes in May 2012. THQ executive vice president of core games Danny Bilson noted that the publisher will continue working on Company of Heroes 2 following its launch next year. On December 19, publisher THQ filed for bankruptcy just after postponing the release date of the video game. The following month, on January 23, THQ had sold Relic Entertainment to Sega for US$26.6 million as part of an auction of the company's properties in result of the bankruptcy.

Company of Heroes 2 takes advantage of DirectX 11 but also supports DirectX 10. The game also utilizes Valve's Steamworks technology with matchmaking and achievements.

Company of Heroes 2 was released in North America and Europe on June 25, 2013.

=== Downloadable content ===
Relic has released downloadable content for the game after its release:

- Commanders: This adds new abilities and units to a player's arsenal, which are available in skirmish and multiplayer matches. A player can choose up to 3 commanders of which he can choose one during a skirmish. This commander will then give access to 5 unique units/abilities. Some commanders have been given away for free at certain events by Relic.
- Cosmetic Items: Vehicle skins allow to alter the camouflage pattern of certain vehicles and tanks and are a purely cosmetic change. Faceplates are another cosmetic change only visible in the main menu or loading screen when joining a multiplayer match.
- Content Packs: With the release of the Western Front Armies DLC, the playable factions of the U.S Forces (USF) and Oberkommando West (OKW) are available. Relic had released The Western Front Armies and Ardennes Assault DLCs. Ardennes Assault added a new, non-linear campaign taking place in Belgium as the USF, pitting three playable companies against the OKW in various scenarios and skirmish maps with unique conditions. That expansion was praised for its new layer of strategy and uncompromising difficulty. The third expansion of the game, titled The British Forces, was released, adding the British as a playable faction in skirmish and multiplayer.

== Reception ==
Reception

Aggregate score
Aggregator	Score
Metacritic	80/100

Review scores
Publication	Score
GameSpot	7.5/10
IGN	8.4/10
PC Gamer (US)	8/10
Polygon	7/10

PC World gave the game three and a half out of five. PC Gamer rated the game at 80 concluding: "Company of Heroes 2 is the USSR of real-time strategy games: huge, powerful and just a little bit broken". IGN gave the game an 8.4: "More sequel-sized expansion than true successor, Company of Heroes 2 repeats many of the original Company of Heroes feats".

As of March 31, 2014, the game has sold 680,000 copies in Europe and North America.

=== Controversy ===
Relic has been criticized by critics and historians about accuracy of its portrayal of the Eastern Front in World War II. An article written for video game website Polygon by Colin Campbell reflecting on the subject stated that the "comments on forums and on Metacritic are testament to the strong feelings that the war still generates". In the same article, it cites the game's director Quinn Duffy who in regard to the creative direction of the first and second game felt that "the second game is painted on a broader canvas", whereas "in contrast, the first game focused on a small group of soldiers and did not seek to take a wider view".

=== Reception and criticism in Russia ===
In Russia and Post-Soviet states the game was found offensive by many users and critics for portraying the Red Army commanders as cruel, using their own soldiers in a cold-blooded way, exaggerating brutal war tactics. After the video made by the Russian blogger BadComedian (real name - Evgeny Bazhenov), thousands of people signed a Change.org petition demanding Steam to block the game in CIS countries.

Russian game publisher 1C-Softclub stopped distribution of the game on 26 July 2013 due to the strong negative feedback (notably a petition to stop the sale that was filed by the game players). Following the news, the game's publisher SEGA released a statement that they were "taking this issue very seriously and are investigating these concerns thoroughly with all relevant partners".
