= Company of Heroes: Opposing Fronts =

- Developer: Relic Entertainment
- Publishers: THQ (Initial); Sega (online services: 2013-)
- Producer: Shane Neville
- Designers: Josh Mosqueira; Quinn Duffy
- Programmer: Ian Thomson
- Artists: Nicholas Carota; Erin Olorenshaw
- Writers: Stephen Dinehart; Adrian Vershinin
- Composers: Ian Livingstone; Inon Zur (Note: Additional music by Jeremy Soule)
- Engine: Essence Engine; Havok (physics engine)
- Platforms: Windows, Mac OS X, Android, iPadOS
- Release: Windows: NA/AU: September 25, 2007; EU: September 28, 2007; Mac OS X: WW: March 1, 2012; Android, iPadOS: WW: April 13, 2021
- Genre: Real-time strategy
- Modes: Single-player, multiplayer

Company of Heroes: Opposing Fronts (abbreviated CoH:OF) is the stand alone expansion pack to Company of Heroes, a real-time strategy game for computers running the Windows operating system. Opposing Fronts was developed by Canadian-based RTS developer Relic Entertainment, and published by THQ in September 2007. Another standalone expansion to the Company of Heroes series, Tales of Valor, was released in April 2009. The expansion was made available for Android and iPadOS on April 13, 2021.

== Gameplay ==
=== Dynamic Environmental Effects System ===
Opposing Fronts implements a Dynamic Weather Effects system consisting of real time weather effects and day-to-night time transitions. In addition to these enhancements, particular birds sing at various times of the day and during specific weather patterns. Although Relic had initially indicated otherwise, the Dynamic Weather Effects system has no tactical impact on the battlefield.

=== New single-player campaigns ===
Opposing Fronts introduces two new single player campaigns. The campaigns feature gameplay from the British perspective and the German perspective. The British campaign is based on the Liberation of Caen. It features nine missions focusing on the attack by British and Canadian forces from Sword, Gold, and Juno Beaches to the city of Caen. The German Panzer Elite's campaign is based on driving back Allied forces during Operation Market Garden. It features eight playable missions following a Panzer Elite Kampfgruppe in occupied Netherlands that is bracing itself for one of the largest airborne invasions in history.

=== Compatibility ===
Company of Heroes players are able to play against Company of Heroes: Opposing Fronts users. Those who own both games can either play as the Americans or the British against the Wehrmacht or the Panzer Elite. Those who own only Company of Heroes can play only as the American or Wehrmacht armies.

== Factions ==
=== British 2nd Army ===
The British are the new Allied army in the series. Their primary advantages are defensive. A greater number of static defences can be built, such as slit trenches and anti-tank emplacements. These emplacements have an associated population and manpower cost to prevent the map being overrun with defences. Their standard unit, the Infantry Section, has stances that alters their speed and reactions. Though more effective than their American counterparts, most British infantry move slower in neutral or hostile territory unless led by a Lieutenant or Captain, which are extremely expensive. The British mainly rely on officers, such as the Captain, Lieutenant and the Cromwell Command Tank, to improve effectiveness. British bases can be packed up and redeployed at different positions, but at the cost of freezing resource income during the move. Veterancy for the British is also unique. Only officers can become veterans. As they gain rank, they gain new abilities and benefits for their soldiers. Infantry units can become more mobile if mounted in the Bren Gun Carrier, and engineers get support from the fast moving Stuart tank early in the game.

The command trees for the British army in the game are based on famous branches of British and Commonwealth armed forces. The three trees are:

- Royal Canadian Artillery: this heavy-artillery based regiment allows the player to use creeping barrage, counter-battery fire, overwatch, and allows the player to deploy Priest Self Propelled Gun and supercharge artillery shots.
- Royal Commandos: players who choose this regiment can deploy commandos, who are adept at harassing enemy infantry, and the light Tetrarch tank via a Hamilcar Glider. As long as the glider remains on the field, it is capable of producing specific units (depending on which glider was called in), as well as in certain cases reinforcing nearby units, although all gliders apart from the HQ glider must be in connected territory to produce more units. Other abilities include tracing enemy troop movements, intercepting Axis messages, and planting decoy flares. This regiment is inspired from the Parachute Regiment, SAS and the 6th Airborne Division which saw action during the Normandy campaign.
- Royal Engineers: this regiment gives players access to three variations of the Churchill tank (MkIV, AVRE and Crocodile), improves entrenchments and the mobile H.Q, and allows tanks to entrench themselves.

=== German Panzer Elite ===
The Panzer Elite, also called the Kampfgruppe Lehr is a faction designed by the game developers who draw their inspiration from the Panzer Lehr Division and an amalgam of German units from Operation Market Garden, including the 2nd SS Panzer Corps and Luftwaffe paratroopers.

The Panzer Elite mainly focuses on speed and vehicles. They cannot build static defenses apart from a few doctrine-specific heavy weapons. They rely instead on the use of halftracks and similar light vehicles to hold territory and increase resource income. They also don't use support weapon crews, instead they use support halftracks, for example, instead of an anti-tank gun, they have an anti-tank halftrack. Unlike other players' halftracks, Panzergrenadiers (the standard Panzer Elite infantry) can fire heavy weapons, such as Panzerschrecks, StG44 automatic rifles, or mortars, from inside the vehicle. They can also repair vehicles, but at a slower pace than standard engineer units. At the same time, the Panzer Elite has Kettenkrads and Bergetiger repair units.

The three doctrines for the Panzer Elite are:

- Scorched Earth Tactics: Allows the player to construct environmental defenses (i.e., blocking a road, or sector artillery). Players can also completely disable or booby trap strategic points or buildings and use the Hummel Mobile Artillery Platform.
- Luftwaffe Tactics: Allows the player to deploy Wirbelwind flakpanzers, Henschel Hs 129 ground attack aircraft and Fallschirmjäger. Luftwaffe ground forces install Flakvierling and FlaK 88 turrets, and can blanket areas with Butterfly Bombs (with Type 70 fuses). Players using this doctrine also receive advanced repair even if the player has not researched the skill yet. This allows them to repair vehicles far faster than the standard Panzergrenadiers.
- Tank Destroyer Tactics: Allows the player to deploy Jagdpanther and Hetzer tank destroyers, while the infantry has improved ability to detect and engage enemy tanks. Panzergrenadiers also gain access to Tellermines and squads are issued a double number of Panzerschrecks and anti-tank grenades.

== Plot ==
=== Liberation of Caen ===
The British 3rd Battalion, under the command of Major Blackmore is tasked with taking the city of Caen. A day behind schedule, the battalion encounters further delays from German troops in the area. After securing the town of Authie, several bridges over the River Odon and Hill 112 in succession, British Commandos along with Canadian infantry fight an overnight battle to secure an airfield at Carpiquet. Though successful, the Germans counterattack at Hill 112, threatening the British flank.

With armor reinforcement, the Royal Scots Engineers retain the hill, and soon after the battalion moves on Caen. Bombardment by the Royal Air Force however turns the city in a hazardous quagmire, the Germans having dug in amongst the rubble. After heavy fighting with the German defenders, 3rd Battalion finally secure Caen and successfully repel a heavy German counterattack. 3rd Battalion then finishes off the remaining I SS Panzer Corps in Bourguebus before being allowed to rest as the 2nd Battalion continue the advance.

=== Operation Market Garden ===
In Wolfheze, Kampfgruppe Lehr are training raw recruits when British paratroopers descend from the skies. Using whatever means necessary, the Kampfgruppe repel the attack on their position. Plans for the entire operation are discovered in a downed British glider, and are brought to the attention of Major General Voss, commander of the Kampfgruppe. The plans indicate that the British 1st Airborne intends to capture strategic bridges across the Rhine in Oosterbeek and Arnhem. Kampfgruppe Lehr are tasked with intercepting the landed paratroopers and slowing their advances by destroying the railway bridge at Oosterbeek.

Vital to the paratroopers success also relies upon the British 30 Corps linking up with them along Highway 69 known as well as 'Hell's Highway'. Kampfgruppe Lehr mobilizes at Valkenswaard to stall and delay 30 Corps. The bridge at Best is also destroyed before the American 101st Airborne Division can secure it. Kampfgruppe Lehr then returns to secure and recapture Arnhem, the last crossing into Germany still in Allied hands. The last pocket of Allied forces in Oosterbeek is finally brought to surrender by the Kampfgruppe, putting an end to the daring Market Garden.

== Interplayability ==
Opposing Fronts is not a classic expansion in that it does not require the original game. By itself, it allows partial access to the original game's assets in multiplayer mode. This allows players of the original game to play with those who have Opposing Fronts, even if only one of the players owns the expansion. In the same way, players who own both games can play as and against any faction. However, Opposing Fronts players also have the option to play with only those who own the expansion. This stand-alone setup is similar to Warhammer 40,000: Dawn of War, another Relic title, and its subsequent expansions.

Opposing Fronts requires customers to create an online account for multiplayer. In an effort by Relic to counter piracy, the game requests account authentication if Internet access is detected. Otherwise, a standard DVD check is used.

== Reception ==
Reception

Aggregate scores
| Aggregator | Score |
|---|---|
| GameRankings | 87% |
| Metacritic | 87/100 |

Review scores
| Publication | Score |
|---|---|
| Eurogamer | 8/10 |
| GameSpot | 8/10 |
| IGN | 8.8/10 |

Company of Heroes: Opposing Fronts received "generally favorable" reviews, according to review aggregator Metacritic.

During the 11th Annual Interactive Achievement Awards, Opposing Fronts received a nomination for "Strategy/Simulation Game of the Year" by the Academy of Interactive Arts & Sciences.
