= Konung: Legend of the North =

1999 video game

- Developer(s): 1C
- Publisher(s): RU: 1C; EU: PAN Interactive; NA: Strategy First
- Engine: Infinity Engine
- Platform(s): Windows
- Release: RU: August 23, 1999; EU: 2000; NA: January 4, 2001
- Genre(s): Role-playing video game
- Mode(s): Single player

Konung: Legend of the North (Russian: Князь: Легенды Лесной страны) is a role-playing video game (CRPG) developed by 1C and released in 2000 by Strategy First. The game takes place in the 7th century in Scandinavia, a world full of legends and myths. The main character looks for three pieces of an amulet to open a gate that leads to a mighty dragon, who defends the "Bracelet of Dominion". The game has 2 sequels, Konung 2: Blood of Titans. and Konung III: Ties of the Dynasty.

== Konung 2 ==
Konung 2: Blood of Titans
- Developer(s): 1C
- Publisher(s): Got Game Entertainment
- Engine: Infinity Engine
- Platform(s): Windows
- Release: NA: November 30, 2004
- Genre(s): Role-playing video game
- Mode(s): Single player

Konung 2: Blood of Titans (Russian: Князь 2) is a role-playing video game developed by 1C, released in 2004. It is the sequel to the 2000 PC game, Konung: Legends of the North.

Our hero who helped to defeat the forces of darkness now is cursed by a demonic artifact - bracelet called Sovereign. The recent hero turned into a dark master and threatens the land he saved. As legend says, only six descendants of the Titans can face it.

== Konung 3 ==
Konung III: Ties of the Dynasty
- Developer(s): 1C Company
- Publisher(s): 1C Company
- Platform(s): Microsoft Windows
- Release: 6 November 2009(RU)
- Genre(s): Role-playing video game
- Mode(s): Single-player multiplayer

Konung III: Ties of the Dynasty (Russian: Князь III: Новая династия) is a 2010 video game set in the Early Middle Ages. It combines elements of RPG and strategy games. Konung III is the third game in the Konung series.

Konung III features a game world based on Scandinavian, Slavic and Byzantine mythology. The player visits different villages and meets different characters over the course of the game; certain NPCs can be hired to assist the player in battle. The game will allow the use of both melee and ranged weapons.
