= Boris Nuraliev =

Russian entrepreneur and scientist

Boris Georgievich Nuraliev
- Бори́с Гео́ргиевич Нурали́ев
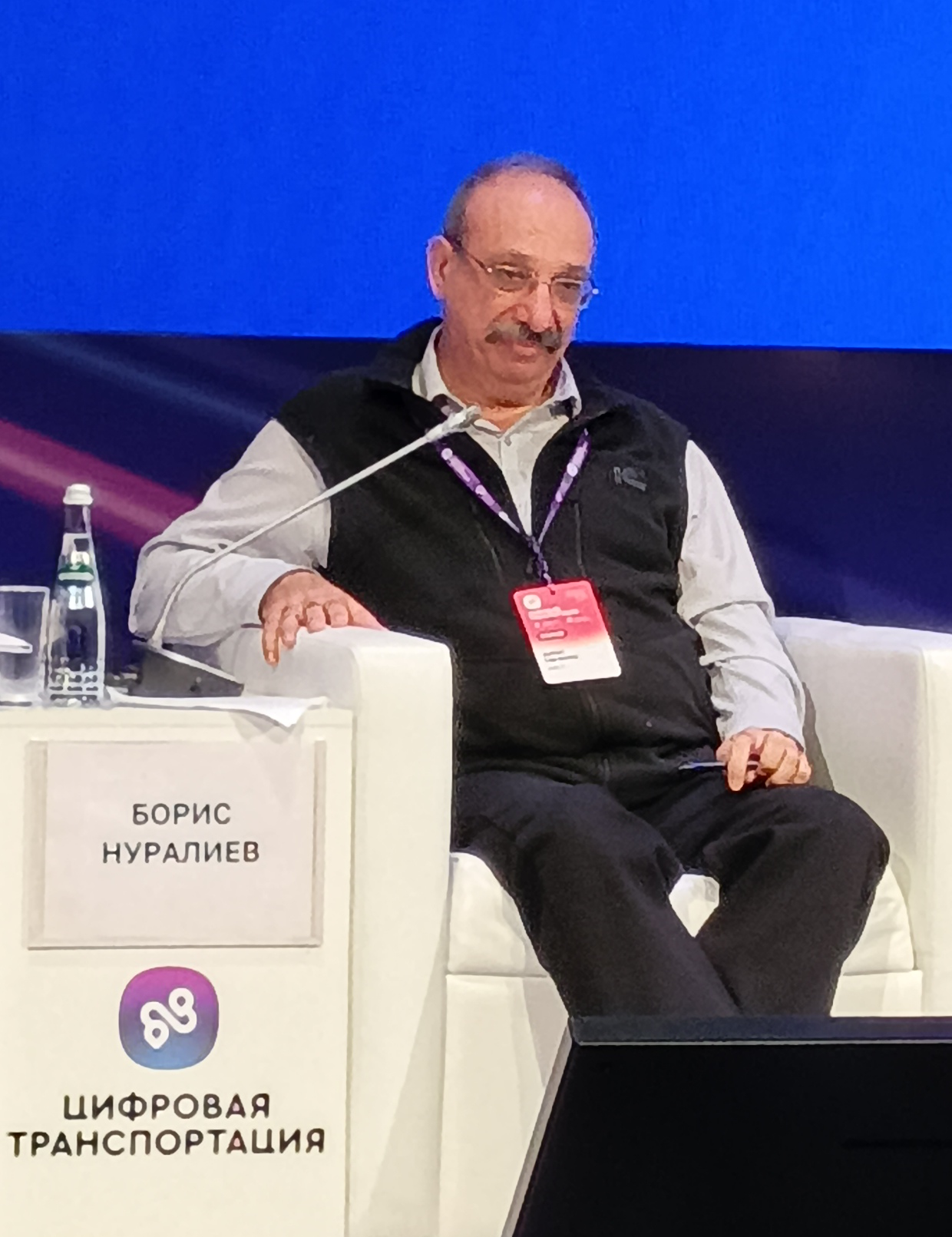
- Boris Nuraliev in 2024
- Education: Moscow State University of Economics, Statistics, and Informatics
- Occupations: Founder and CEO of the 1C Company
- Known for: 1C Company

Boris Georgievich Nuraliev (Russian: Бори́с Гео́ргиевич Нурали́ев; born 18 July 1958) is a Soviet and Russian entrepreneur, billionaire, one of the founders of the 1C company and scientist, who heads the «Corporate Information Systems» department at Moscow Institute of Physics and Technology and the «1С» specialised department at the National Research University – Higher School of Economics.

Boris was sanctioned by Poland as part of the sanctions against the 2022 Russian invasion of Ukraine.

== Personal life ==
Boris is married. He has 2 children.
