= Constantinople by Night =

1996 role-playing game supplement

- Cover art
- Designers: Philippe Boulle, Joshua Mosqueria-Asheim, Lucien Soulban
- Illustrators: Michael Gaydos, Eric Lacombe, Chuck Regan, Andrew Ritchie, Andrew Trabbold, William O'Connor, Matt Milberger
- Publishers: White Wolf Publishing
- Publication: 1996
- Genres: Tabletop role-playing game supplement
- Systems: Storyteller System
- Parent games: Vampire: The Dark Ages
- Series: World of Darkness
- ISBN: 1-56504-278-6

Constantinople by Night is a supplement published by White Wolf Publishing in 1996 for the medieval horror role-playing game Vampire: The Dark Ages, a spin-off of Vampire: The Masquerade.

== Contents ==
In 1996, White Wolf Publishing released Vampire: The Dark Ages, which took their popular horror roleplaying game Vampire: The Masquerade and reset it in medieval Europe in the year 1197.

The same year, White Wolf released the first supplement for Vampire: The Dark Ages titled Constantinople by Night, a 128-page softcover book designed by Philippe Boulle, Joshua Mosqueria-Asheim, and Lucien Soulban, with illustrations by Michael Gaydos, Eric Lacombe, Chuck Regan, Andrew Ritchie, and Andrew Trabbold, and cover art by William O'Connor and Matt Milberger. The book provides details of medieval Constantinople, including history, geography, and notable persons. In addition to actual history, the book mixes in the fictional history of the Trinity of the Undead. The focus of the book is on the Kindred, and how players new to the city can interact with the warring factions.

The book also includes a brief scenario for an adventure in the city.

== Reception ==
In the February 1997 edition of Arcane (Issue 16), Mark Barter was enthusiastic about this book, saying, "This is a spectacular backdrop for adventure and intrigue - a powerful and beautiful city tainted by blood and pride, which is founded on a dream of eternity that is about to end in flames." Barter thought this was "an excellent supplement" but criticized the book for the brief scenario, commenting "A full-length adventure would have rounded off the package perfectly rather than the slightly threadbare outlines given here." He concluded by giving the book an excellent rating of 9 out of 10, saying, " Impressive in its ambition and epic sweep, this is a magnificent addition to the ongoing masterpiece that is the World of Darkness."

In the October 1997 edition of Dragon (Issue #240), Rick Swan calls the book "a humdinger, a dazzling treatise on ancient Byzantine society as seen through the eyes of a psychopath." Although Swan liked the content, he found that the book "makes life difficult for the gamemaster, as it neglects to include either an index or a serviceable table of contents." He also thought that "the brief scenario tacked on at the end doesn't do justice to the material that precedes it." Despite these problems, Swan gave the book an above average rating of 5 out of 6, saying, "Constantinople’s vivid prose makes the glitches easy to overlook."

== Reviews ==
- Backstab #1 (Jan-Feb 1997)
- Backstab #7 (Jan-Feb 1998)
- Casus Belli V1 #101 (Jan 1997)
- Casus Belli V1 #109 (Oct 1997)
- Casus Belli V1 #113 (Apr-May 1998)
- Valkyrie #14 (1997)
- Envoyer #25
