= Men of War =

- Developers: Best Way; Dark Fox; Realore Studios; Digitalmindsoft; 1C-SoftClub; Aspyr
- Publishers: 1C; 1C-SoftClub; Fulqrum Publishing
- Platform: Microsoft Windows
- First release: Soldiers: Heroes of World War II; June 30, 2004
- Latest release: Men of War II; May 15, 2024

Men of War is a real-time tactics video game franchise, based mainly in World War II. The games were first developed by Best Way, a company based in Ukraine.

== Main series ==
Release timeline
2004	Soldiers: Heroes of World War II
2005
2006	Faces of War
2007
2008	Men of War
2009	Men of War: Red Tide
2010
2011	Men of War: Assault Squad
2011	Men of War: Vietnam
2012	Men of War: Condemned Heroes
2013
2014	Men of War: Assault Squad 2
2015
2016	Assault Squad 2: Men of War Origins
2017
2018
2019	Men of War II: Arena
2019	Men of War: Assault Squad 2 - Cold War
2020
2021
2022
2023
2024	Men of War II

=== Soldiers: Heroes of World War II ===
Soldiers: Heroes of World War II is the original game of the Men of War series, and uses an early GEM engine. The player can control German, British, American or Soviet soldiers in single and multiplayer. As with many of the Men of War games, the missions are based on leading a small amount of forces into battle against a larger enemy. The goal is to use military tactics in the simulation to overcome the enemy with minimal losses.

=== Faces of War ===
Faces of War is the sequel to Soldiers: Heroes of World War II, with new features added onto the GEM engine. The player can freely move the camera with a fully 3D engine, and can destroy virtually anything in the environment. Although the player still controls a smaller group of units, the missions are usually on a more massive scale, rather than small special operations. This aspect includes AI units allied to the player, more enemy units and more vehicles. The multiplayer also has been expanded, with more options, modes and larger battles.

=== Men of War ===
Men of War was the first to be put under the Men of War name. At the time of release, it had the largest single-player campaign. The game includes enhanced graphics compared to Faces of War, and a more expansive single and multiplayer. Part of the single-player game reverts to the Soldiers: Heroes of World War II style of battles, with control of a small squad being put in the hands of the player against a larger enemy. Other single-player missions require the player to control larger forces in defense of an area, although even those missions provide the player with an outnumbered force. Larger battles usually require the player to eventually assault the enemy rather than defend, if the latter had been given. The multiplayer expanded beyond the standard of Faces of War, with a larger number of maps of bigger size. Also included were four factions (Germany, the UK, America and the Soviet Union), which eventually was increased to five with the introduction of Japan in a patch (only in multiplayer).

=== Men of War: Red Tide ===
Men of War: Red Tide is the first of the standalone 'expansions' to Men of War. The game is slightly enhanced from Men of War via its minor bug fixes and tweaks. The game includes the largest single player campaign in the Men of War series, with 28 missions across 6 campaigns. The game does not, however, include any multiplayer features which became a major criticism. The single-player is based on the feats of the Naval Infantry of the Black Sea Fleet in World War II. The missions are generally longer and extensively difficulty compared to the other games.

=== Men of War: Assault Squad ===
Men of War: Assault Squad was the first game in the Men of War series to not have a story-based campaign. Assault Squad is instead geared more towards massive scale multiplayer battles, and is the first in the series to be based mainly on multiplayer. The game also builds on a more massive scale battle system. The game is also geared more towards large amounts of infantry, which works hand in hand with the ability to select a larger squad of troops. Infantry are less valuable than in previous titles, and can sometimes be considered cannon fodder. The game also has more multiplayer maps, enhanced graphics, more vehicles and infantry. A large array of vehicles and infantry are available, with stats according to the unit price. For example, a group of riflemen would have only basic rifles, grenades, and occasionally only field caps. On the other hand, the elite unit would have an upgraded health, anti-tank grenades, helmets and better weaponry. The game includes Germany, Great Britain, the United States, the Soviet Union and Japan as playable factions, each with a large array of tanks, guns, vehicles and infantry. The game also has skirmish missions, which are on a similar scale and somewhat similar style as multiplayer, but are faced off against a large defending AI force and can be played online. Multiple DLC were released, adding skirmishes and multiplayer maps. A Game Of The Year edition was released after all the DLC was released.

=== Men of War: Vietnam ===
Men of War: Vietnam is the first and only official Men of War game to not be set in World War II, instead set in the Vietnam War. The game contains two single player campaigns. One of the campaigns is based on the story of two Soviet military consultants and two North Vietnamese soldiers caught stranded in enemy territory after being ambushed. The squad finds themselves caught up in the Tet Offensive on their long escape back to North Vietnamese territory. The other campaign is based on the story of five American elite special operations soldiers in North Vietnam in special operations and full-scale battles accompanied occasionally by friendly American and South Vietnamese soldiers. The game contains multiplayer, but it is not a focus. The campaign is also relatively short, but it is somewhat difficult. The game is based mostly on the assets of the World War II games, with only a small group of tanks, vehicles, weapons, and troops being new. A deluxe edition was released.

=== Men of War: Condemned Heroes ===
Men of War: Condemned Heroes is based on the stories of the penal military units of the Soviet Union during World War II. Much like the more successful Red Tide, the game contains a more historical basis, with an encyclopedia accompanying the player through the campaign. The encyclopedia tells about the true stories of the penal units. The missions in the game are specifically difficult, much like Red Tide and Vietnam. The player controls sections of a large number of penal unit troops on the Eastern Front. The player leads the troops in anywhere from base assaults, to trench assaults, to sabotage, to full battles and more. Most are on a grand scale and are usually filled with AI-controlled allied forces that support the player. Multiplayer is included, unlike Red Tide, but it is not a focus of the game.

=== Men of War: Assault Squad 2 ===
Men of War: Assault Squad 2 is one of the latest titles in the Men of War series. The game is a remaster of the original Assault Squad, but it contains a heavily modified and enhanced GEM engine. Beyond the major graphical improvements, the game also includes Steam workshop support, extensive mod support, more maps and skirmish missions, and enhanced engine capabilities (multi-core utilization). The multiplayer is on a much larger and extensive scale, with more modes and units. Steam matchmaking integration is also presented on a much more dedicated scale.

==== Assault Squad 2: Men of War Origins ====
Assault Squad 2: Men of War Origins is a DLC for Men of War: Assault Squad 2. Initially, this game was a standalone expansion for Men of War: Assault Squad 2 but it became a DLC for Men of War: Assault Squad 2 shortly after. Assault Squad 2: Men of War Origins is a remaster of the original Men of War based on the modified and enhanced Assault Squad 2 GEM engine. Along with the release of Men of War Origins, a large free update with enhanced models from Men of War Origins was released for Men of War: Assault Squad 2. The original campaign of Men of War is included, but enhanced and modified for modernization. Multiplayer is included in the style of Men of War.

==== Men of War: Assault Squad 2 - Cold War ====
Men of War: Assault Squad 2 - Cold War is a standalone expansion for Men of War: Assault Squad 2. It includes for the first time dynamic campaign for the single-player and co-op mode and the usual multiplayer modes.

=== Men of War II: Arena ===
Men of War II: Arena (originally known as Soldiers: Arena until September 2019) is a now defunct title from the Best Way, original developers of Soldiers: Heroes of World War II, Faces of War, and Men of War. The game was set in World War II, and focused on large scale strategic multiplayer battles instead of single-player. The game was on an independently developed and enhanced GEM engine, created by the original makers of the engine. In September 2021, the servers were shut down, and development was shifted to focus on Men of War II, a full-feature sequel to the original Men of War.

=== Men of War II ===
Men of War II was developed by Best Way and published by Fulqrum Publishing. A direct sequel to Men of War, the game features new mechanics and modes and is set in Eastern and Western Fronts of World War II.

== Other games ==
=== Battle of Empires: ===
Battle of Empires: is an independently developed title based on the original Men of War GEM engine. It is created by Great War Team, and published by Best Way Soft. It was originally a modification for Men of War until it eventually became a full game. It was in early access until a full release. Set in World War I, the game was meant to realistically portray the war in a gritty tone, but due to the developers and the constraints of the early GEM engine, the game was met with mostly mixed reviews.

=== Call to Arms ===
Call to Arms is a video game based on the Men of War GEM engine developed by Digitalmindsoft. It is the first Men of War-affiliated game set in the modern era, where a fictional United States Army and Global Revolutionary Movement are in conflict. The game is focused on multiplayer.

=== Call to Arms - Gates of Hell: Ostfront ===
Call to Arms - Gates of Hell: Ostfront is a stand-alone expansion pack to the original Call to Arms game. It was developed by Barbed Wire Studios and published by Digitalmindsoft. After a breakdown in relations between Barbed Wire Studios and Best Way, the project was picked up by Digitalmindsoft in a new publishing deal. The game focuses on the chaotic, vast war zone that was the eastern front of the second world war.
