= Men of War: Vietnam =

2011 video game

- Developer(s): 1C Company
- Publisher(s): 1C Company
- Series: Men of War
- Engine: GEM 2
- Platform(s): Microsoft Windows
- Release: September 9, 2011
- Genre(s): Real-time tactics, strategy
- Mode(s): Single-player, multiplayer

Men of War: Vietnam (Russian: Диверсанты: Вьетнам, or Saboteurs: Vietnam) is a real-time tactics and strategy game developed and published by 1C Company. It is the fourth game in the Men of War series. The game was released on September 9, 2011, for Microsoft Windows, and is set during the Vietnam War.

== Gameplay ==
Two story-driven campaigns were added along with new locations, like the titular Vietnamese jungle, along with additional weaponry.

The US campaign focuses on a team of elite US Army Special Forces soldiers: sergeant John Merrill, machine-gunner Jim Walsh, sniper Sonny Armstrong, grenade launcher operator Carl Dillan, and combat engineer Bill Kirby. In some missions, they infiltrate areas alone, while in others they fight together with the aid of the US and South Vietnamese troops.

The North Vietnamese campaign tells the story of two Soviet military consultants, Fedor Kazakov and Mikhail 'Misha' Morozov, and two soldiers of the North Vietnamese Army, Pham Tinh Minh and Le Van Cuong, who are the only survivors of an ambush prepared by the US troops. They attempt to return to North Vietnamese territory with minimal supplies and inferior numbers. On their way, they fight through several battles, such as a realistic adaptation of the Tet Offensive.

Missions range from infiltration operations to full-scale battles.

== Development ==
Men of War: Vietnam was announced in June 2010.

== Reception ==
Men of War: Vietnam received mixed reviews from professional critics upon release. Aggregate review websites GameRankings and Metacritic assigned scores of 66% and 68/100 respectively.
