= Company of Heroes 3 =

2023 video game

- Developer: Relic Entertainment
- Publishers: Sega (2023-2025) (Note: Originally published by Sega. Currently self-published by Relic Entertainment after split from Sega.); Relic Entertainment (2025-present) (Note: Originally published by Sega. Currently self-published by Relic Entertainment after split from Sega.)
- Director: David Littman
- Producer: David Littman
- Designers: Andrew Denault; Matt Phillip; Sacha Narine
- Artists: Tristan Brett; Patrick Lopetrone; Christine Hubbard
- Writer: Philip Harris
- Composers: Tilman Sillescu; Benny Oschmann
- Series: Company of Heroes
- Engine: Essence Engine 5.0
- Platforms: Windows; PlayStation 5; Xbox Series X/S
- Release: Windows; February 23, 2023; PlayStation 5, Xbox Series X/S; May 30, 2023
- Genre: Real-time strategy
- Modes: Single-player, multiplayer

Company of Heroes 3 is a real-time strategy game developed by Relic Entertainment and published by Sega. A sequel to Company of Heroes 2, the game features new mechanics and modes and is set in the Italian and North African theaters of World War II.

== Gameplay ==
In Company of Heroes 3, the players take the role of Allied Forces during their invasion of Italy and Axis forces in the North African campaign.

The game has features new to the series such as the Tactical Pause system, which allows the player to pause a battle and queue up commands to be done after the game is resumed. Company of Heroes 3 also has an improved destruction system that gives the title more granular destruction, such as individual tiles and bricks crumbling off buildings. Italian Partisans are allied NPCs that can either be used on the map or be called in during battles. The story is dynamic, and the player's interactions with the game's various commanders can affect the narrative's ending.

== Development ==
Relic Entertainment led the game's development. The team chose the Mediterranean theatre as the setting allowed the inclusion of a variety of environments, which is a feature frequently requested by players of older games. In addition, the team added that the Italian areas in the game offered "broader palette for environmental gameplay" and players can make use of verticality of the maps to plan their moves and attacks.

At the beginning of development, the studio recruited modders and competitive players to form a player council. The council worked with Relic during preproduction to determine what the new entry should focus on mechanically and where the game should take place. The executive producer commented on how it was chosen: "And we all agreed that we wanted a new theatre, we didn't want to revisit the Western Front or the Eastern Front. So really, the only two things left were the Mediterranean and Pacific. We put them both on the board, and it was just 10-0. Mediterranean over Pacific." Player testing for Company of Heroes 3 started prior to the official announcement through Amplitude's Games2Gether program. A demo for the game was available for a limited time shortly after the announcement.

The game was officially announced for Windows by Relic and publisher Sega in July 2021. It was originally set to be released on November 17, 2022, but it was delayed to February 23, 2023. Versions for PlayStation 5 and Xbox Series X/S were announced during The Game Awards 2022.

In August 2022, the Polish toy company Cobi announced that they acquired a license with Relic Entertainment to publish North Africa and Italy themed brick sets. On April 13, 2023, it was announced that the PlayStation 5 and Xbox Series X/S versions of game would release on May 30, 2023.

== Reception ==
Reception

Aggregate score
Aggregator	Score
Metacritic	PC: 81/100; PS5: 70/100; XSX: 79/100

Review scores
Publication	Score
Famitsu	29/40
IGN	6/10
NME	5/5
PC Gamer (US)	82/100
PC Games (DE)	8/10
PCGamesN	7/10
Shacknews	8/10
TouchArcade	4/5

Company of Heroes 3 received "generally favorable" reviews, according to review aggregator Metacritic on the PC and Xbox Series X versions. The PlayStation 5 version received "mixed or average" reviews. The game was nominated for "Best Sim / Strategy Game" at The Game Awards 2023.

PC Gamer thought that the Italian campaign was "fundamentally broken", with AI lacking aggressiveness and the implementation of subcommanders which they described as "confused". PCGamesN felt that although the gameplay lacked innovation, it lived up to previous entries, "The central story missions don't do a lot to innovate on what Company of Heroes 2 established almost a decade ago, but they're a hell of a lot of fun". While feeling mixed on the North African campaign's portrayal of Erwin Rommel, Eurogamer enjoyed the game's bombastic spectacle, writing, "Everything can be blown to bits, which dovetails rather nicely with a campaign about shooting things with tanks".

IGN liked the set piece encounters of the Italian campaign, but criticized the overall experience, "Every decision on the campaign map is just so low-stakes that it just feels like a waste of time". Polygon praised the new active pause system, saying "it makes for a vastly more approachable game". Rock Paper Shotgun felt that while some elements of the game were unpolished, the overall scope of the campaign made up for it "Still, the sheer breadth of what's on offer here in the Italian campaign is mightily impressive for a first attempt at this style of war gaming... it feels like precisely the sort of homecoming you'd want from this prodigal RTS series". Kotaku noted that Company of Heroes 3's new setting proved a match for interesting tactical encounters, "In Italy the series has found an even better match between setting and gameplay".

TouchArcade wrote that the visuals proved inconsistent on a small screen but the overall gameplay remained intact, "As of its most recent patch, I'm very pleased with Company of Heroes 3 on Steam Deck, and you will find a lot to like here assuming you're OK with the controls". NPR criticized the repetitiveness of the Italian campaign, but liked the co-op experiences possible in multiplayer, "Multiplayer gameplay is nothing like the methodical campaign skirmishes — it's fast, intense, and unrelenting".
