= Josh Mosqueira =

Video and tabletop game designer

Josh Mosqueira-Asheim is a game designer of both tabletop and video games. From 2012 to 2016, he oversaw the Diablo series at Blizzard Entertainment, releasing Diablo III: Reaper of Souls and developing the first iteration of Diablo IV.

== Early life ==
Josh Mosqueira was born to parents of Canadian and Mexican ancestry. While growing up in Canada, he played Dungeons & Dragons and Warhammer 40,000. Alongside his university studies, he served in the Canadian Armed Forces as a member of the Black Watch regiment.

== Tabletop games ==
In 1996, while in the military and university, Mosqueira became a writer for White Wolf Publishing, co-authoring two books for the Vampire: The Masquerade horror role-playing game, Constantinople by Night, and Montreal by Night. Mosqueira, along with Phil Boulle and Stephane Brochu, co-authored the Tribe 8 (1998) sword and sorcery role-playing game with a post-apocalyptic setting for Dream Pod 9.

Mosqueira's first full-time job was with Relic Entertainment in Vancouver, where he worked on Company of Heroes, Warhammer 40,000: Dawn of War, and Far Cry. He was the Lead Designer for Homeworld 2. For his work on Company of Heroes: Opposing Fronts, he earned an Elan Award in 2008 for outstanding innovation in gaming. After seven years with Relic, Mosqueira moved to Montreal in 2008 to work on Far Cry 3 for Ubisoft.

In February 2011, Jay Wilson, a former co-worker from Relic who collaborated on Company of Heroes, recruited Mosqueira to Blizzard Entertainment in Irvine, California. One of Mosqueira's Ubisoft colleagues had applied to become lead designer of the console version of Diablo III, prompting Wilson to instead recruit Mosqueira, which the latter accepted for warmer weather. In late 2012, Jay Wilson left Blizzard, leaving Mosqueira to succeed him as Lead Designer of Diablo III: Reaper of Souls. Next, Mosqueira conceptualized Diablo IV under the code name Hades, brainstorming that the game would have over-the-shoulder combat similar to the Batman: Arkham series, permadeath, and multiplayer.

In 2016, Mosqueira left Blizzard, restarting development of Diablo IV. In 2017, he joined the start-up video game developer Bonfire Studios in Orange County, California.
