= Company of Heroes =

Real-time strategy video game series

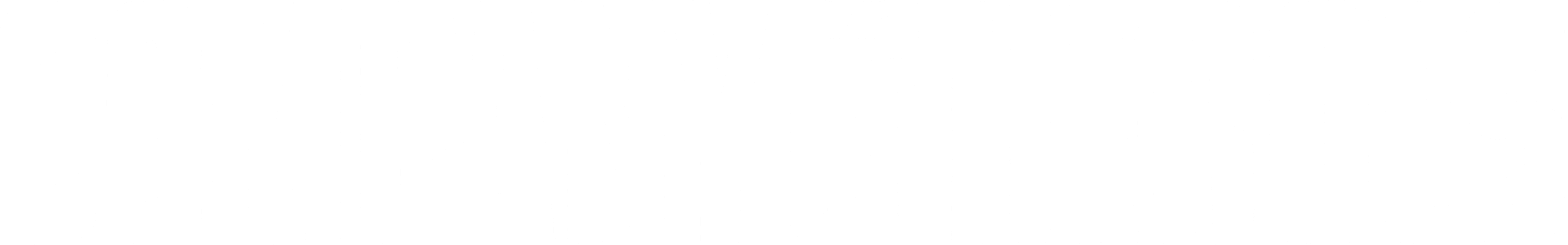
- Genre: Real-time strategy
- Developer: Relic Entertainment
- Publishers: THQ; Sega
- Platforms: Windows; OS X; Linux; iOS; Android; Nintendo Switch; PlayStation 5; Xbox Series X and S
- First release: Company of Heroes; September 12, 2006
- Latest release: Company of Heroes 3 February 23, 2023

Company of Heroes is a real-time strategy video game series developed by Relic Entertainment. The series is set during World War II.

== Games ==
Release timeline
2006	Company of Heroes
2007	Opposing Fronts
2008
2009	Tales of Valor
2010	Company of Heroes Online
2011–2012
2013	Company of Heroes 2
2014	Company of Heroes 2: The Western Front Armies
2014	Company of Heroes 2: Ardennes Assault
2015	Company of Heroes 2: The British Forces
2016–2022
2023	Company of Heroes 3

=== Company of Heroes ===
The first game in the series was released on September 12, 2006, in North America, and September 29, 2006, in Europe. It was ported to iOS and released for iPad on February 13, 2020.

=== Company of Heroes: Opposing Fronts ===
The first stand-alone expansion pack to Company of Heroes, it was released September 25, 2007, in the US and September 28 in Europe.

=== Company of Heroes: Tales of Valor ===
The second stand-alone expansion pack to Company of Heroes, it was released on April 9, 2009.

=== Company of Heroes Online ===
Company of Heroes Online logo

Company of Heroes Online was a free massively multiplayer online real-time strategy game developed by Relic Entertainment and published by THQ. The open beta for the game started on 2 September 2010, and the game was cancelled on March 31, 2011. The game has no link with the original Company of Heroes multiplayer system and is a stand-alone game, unlike its predecessors. The game uses the same graphics engine as the retail release of Company of Heroes. Relic also released a Chinese and a South Korean version of the game. The Chinese version was co-developed and published by Shanda while the South Korean version was published by WindySoft and developed entirely by Relic Entertainment. The Korean and American versions featured the entire single-player campaign from the retail release while the Chinese version did not.

Company of Heroes Online was a real-time strategy game which was based on Company of Heroes. Its gameplay placed emphasis on usage of varying degrees of cover together with a destructible terrain. Another departure from mainstream RTS's was the implementation of sector supply whereby the resource income of a player is linked to the sectors under that player's control. A unique feature of Company of Heroes Online was the large number of combinations of hero units, special abilities and doctrinal abilities a player could utilize, giving the potential for diverse and creative strategies.

=== Company of Heroes 2 ===
A sequel, Company of Heroes 2, was released on June 25, 2013, in North America and Europe. The game features the USSR's Red Army as a new faction and takes the player on various stages of the Eastern Front campaign, from Operation Barbarossa to the Battle of Berlin. It uses the Essence 3.0 engine which includes environmental effects and the "True Sight" and "ColdTech" systems mimicking unit line of sight and weather effects such as snow and mud as well as blizzards.

=== Company of Heroes 3 ===
Company of Heroes 3 was announced by Relic and Sega in July 2021. The game takes place once again in WW2, this time, in Italy and some parts of the North African Campaign. It was released on February 23, 2023.
