= Men of War: Condemned Heroes =

2012 video game

- Developer: 1C Entertainment
- Publisher: 1C Company
- Series: Men of War
- Platform: Microsoft Windows
- Release: April 12, 2012
- Genre: Real-time tactics / strategy
- Modes: Single-player, multiplayer

Men of War: Condemned Heroes (Russian: Штрафбат) is a real-time tactics / strategy game set during World War II. It tells the story of Soviet penal battalions formed under Joseph Stalin's infamous Order 227.

== Reception ==
Reception

Aggregate score
Aggregator	Score
Metacritic	57/100

Review score
Publication	Score
GameSpot	5/10

Men of War: Condemned Heroes received a score of 57/100 on Metacritic from 12 reviews, indicating "mixed or average" reviews.

GameSpot gave the game a "mediocre" score of 5/10, criticizing the repetition of mission objectives and its overall difficulty.
