= Men of War: Assault Squad =

2011 video game

- Developer: Digitalmindsoft
- Publisher: 1C Company
- Designer: Christian Kramer
- Series: Men of War
- Platform: Microsoft Windows
- Release: February 25, 2011
- Genre: Real-time tactics / strategy
- Modes: Single-player, multiplayer

Men of War: Assault Squad (Russian: В тылу врага 2: Штурм, or Behind Enemy Lines 2: Storm) is a game of real-time tactics strategy game set in World War II.

== Development ==
In the development of Assault Squad it was decided to focus more on the infantry part of the game. It adds 15 new missions, improved graphics, Great Britain and Japan as new factions, and a few new units. There was also a temporary name, where A4 defines the build name (Men of War is A3).

DMS released the first official DLC for the Men of War series in April 2011. The MP Supply Pack Alpha features five multiplayer maps for Men of War: Assault Squad.

Before release the game had an exclusive testing phase via payment. After several months of testing DMS offered an open beta if the Men of War: Assault Squad Steam group reached 10,000 players. The target was reached and the game was released in an open beta. After the first beta ended, DMS offered another open beta before release if the Steam group reached 20,000 players. The second beta was opened and stayed available until the game was released.

== Gameplay ==
Assault Squad is primarily a real-time tactics game, but veers more toward strategy than its predecessors due to the absence of any "fixed force" (i.e. no reinforcements) scenarios. It is driven by an intricate simulation that tracks ammunition and fuel, inventories for each and every unit, cover and line of sight, tank combat with penetration and deflection of shells, field of view, and much more beside.

While Assault Squad is geared toward multiplayer, the new co-op Skirmish mode can be played offline without a partner.

Like earlier games in the series, Assault Squad includes a "direct control" feature that allows the player to take control of any unit on the field. This allows fine control during firefights, such as priming grenades before throwing and aiming for specific parts on a tank.

The multiplayer uses the GameSpy client and has a built in Elo rating system. Multiplayer matches can take place on dozens of maps and between the game's five factions. New multiplayer maps are released as DLC. Official multiplayer is unavailable since GameSpy shutdown in May 2014.

=== Infantry Combat ===
Each soldier in Men of War is a self-contained unit controllable by the player using a traditional real time strategy control scheme or through direct control. Every soldier has an inventory consisting of ammunition, weapons, and equipment. While a rifleman might have single frag grenade, elite troops like Rangers or Panzergrenadiers, might have a pair of anti tank grenades and several anti personnel grenades as well as advanced equipment like anti tank rifles or dynamite. Equipment and weapons can be collected from dead soldiers or the ground, or transferred between units.

The game features sophisticated cover based combat as well as deployable sandbags and support weaponry. Infantry can take cover and as the environment will block line of sight and projectiles, laying in ambush or fortifying strategic points like bridges or town squares gives a tactical advantage.

Each of the five factions have different squads of infantry as well as several support infantry such as flamethrowers, snipers, minelayers, and anti tank specialists.

=== Tank Mechanics ===
Assault Squad features a realistic impact system to tank and vehicle armor. Every gun in the game has its own individual penetration values and characteristics. How projectiles interact with armor on impact depends on the range, angle, and strength of the shot, along with many other deciding factors. Projectiles are also capable of penetrating multiple vehicles or ricocheting and causing collateral damage.

An example of a Tiger I angling away to deflect a shot. On the left, the hit indicator is green, showing a high chance of penetration, while the right shows a low chance.

Unlike many other games, tanks have no health point bar, but are instead separated into parts. A shell to the turret, if penetrated, may severely cripple it and disable its rotation. If the gun is damaged, the tank will be unable to fire, while a shot to the engine may result in a fire that will burn out the tank. Tanks can also be de-tracked or simply shot in the hull, which may injure or kill crew members.

Depending on the size of the shell fired and chance, a shot may damage the tank to the point that the crew will abandon the tank. If the tank's hull has not been destroyed, the tank owner or the enemy may be able to repair the tank.

=== Other support units ===
Like most other RTS games, there are also off-map assets such as air and artillery strikes which can be called in on enemy positions if the player has acquired enough MP. These powerful attacks have a cool down time to avoid over use by the player, and certain attacks, such as airstrikes, can be countered by both the enemy AI and hostile players by use of anti aircraft units.

== Other features ==
The game features five factions with unique units, specialties, strengths, and weaknesses. The factions in Assault Squad are the United States Army, the Imperial Japanese Army, German Wehrmacht, the British Commonwealth Forces, and the Soviet Red Army, each with its own campaign. Each nation also features special abilities or unique "elite" units; the American forces can call in large airstrikes, the British have access to SAS units, the Japanese can spawn a large number of light tanks, and so on.

== Reception ==
Reception

Aggregate score
Aggregator	Score
Metacritic	77/100

Review score
Publication	Score
PC PowerPlay	9/10

The game holds an average of 77/100 based on 21 critic reviews on Metacritic. Brett Todd of GameSpot had given the game 8 out of 10, praising its tough, brilliant and aggressive AI.

== Modding ==
Just like previous Men of War titles, Men of War: Assault Squad has spawned a large number of mods and addons. The majority of additions to the game are hosted on Mod DB.
