= Submarine Titans =

2000 video game

- North American cover art
- Developer: Ellipse Studios
- Publisher: Strategy First
- Platform: Microsoft Windows
- Release: NA: August 2, 2000; EU: 2000
- Genre: Real-time strategy
- Modes: Single-player, multiplayer

Submarine Titans is a real-time strategy video game developed by Ellipse Studios and released for Microsoft Windows in 2000.

== Gameplay ==
In this screenshot, a Silicon force is attacking a White Sharks settlement.

Submarine Titans is a real-time strategy video game that takes place in the year 2115 after a comet has struck Earth, driving two human factions, the militant White Sharks and the scientific Black Octopi, to establish underwater bases and fight for dominance over the oceans. The comet also brought a mysterious alien race known as the Silicons, who compete with the two human factions to collect resources and build a gate that would take them back to their homeworld. Each faction has its own ten-mission campaign, and the player can play the three campaigns in any order.

With the exception of their technology trees, the human factions share many similarities and are functionally identical. However, the Silicons use a different resource model. The White Sharks and Black Octopi require a supply of oxygen to power all their structures and must harvest metal and a special element called Corium to build submarines and facilities, while the Silicons must extract silicon from the sea floor to produce their basic resource and use metal to generate energy and power their regeneration ability. Nevertheless, they harvest Corium in the same way as the human factions do.

Because the game takes place underwater, units can be moved up or down in relation to the sea floor, in addition to their movement in a two-dimensional direction. The terrain of the map, which can have hills, mountains and land bridges, affect how a base can be constructed and the movement of the player's units. The game includes a level editor, allowing players to create their own maps. It is also the first real-time strategy game to feature a spectator mode, which allows players to watch multiplayer matches without intervening in the gameplay.

== Development ==
Submarine Titans was developed by Ellipse Studios, an Australian video game company based in Adelaide and formerly known as Megamedia Australia. The development team was composed of 16 people and included seven programmers, four artists, a sound engineer, as well as people who focused on areas such as background and mission development. The game was conceived by one of the game's artists, who was interested in futuristic stories. Although the development team was experienced and had previously worked on video games, the company struggled to find a publisher in Australia, where the video game industry was not a popular market at the time. The engine, which was specifically developed for the game, is capable of rendering 3D landscapes and generating objects as pre-rendered 3D sprites without hardware acceleration. The game was released to manufacturing on June 22, 2000. It was published by Strategy First in North America.

== Reception ==
Reception

Aggregate score
Aggregator	Score
Metacritic	69/100

Review scores
Publication	Score
Computer Games Magazine	3/5
EP Daily	6/10
GameSpot	5.2/10
GameSpy	79/100
IGN	7/10

Submarine Titans received mixed reviews from critics. Greg Kasavin from GameSpot criticized the game for having too steep of a learning curve. He also criticizes the game for having unclear voices and text, even though he notes that the story is detailed according to the manual but the game is very strategical and is very interesting to play. GameSpy editor Tim McConnaughy has mostly praised the game, citing very good premise and delivery, rich configuration options and a clean interface. He noted simple combat and some AI problems and bugs as negatives.

== See also ==
- List of underwater science fiction works
