= Faces of War =

2006 video game

- Face of War cover art. Russian and most European versions of the box cover display a Soviet flag instead of an American one. Germany replaces the flag with a pistol.
- Developer: Best Way
- Publishers: RU: 1C Company; WW: Ubisoft
- Series: Men of War
- Engine: GEM 2
- Platform: Windows
- Release: RUS: September 8, 2006; NA: September 12, 2006; AU: September 14, 2006; EU: September 15, 2006
- Genres: Real-time strategy, real-time tactics
- Modes: Single-player, multiplayer

Faces of War (originally known as Outfront II, Russian: В тылу врага 2, or Behind Enemy Lines 2) is a real-time strategy and real-time tactics war video game developed by Ukrainian developer Best Way and published by Russian publisher 1C Company. The game is a sequel to 2004's Soldiers: Heroes of World War II. Whereas Soldiers had the player controlling a handful of squad members alone in enemy territory, Faces of War engages the player and his squad in massive battles fighting alongside AI controlled squads. The game features a full 3D engine allowing the player to have much greater control over the camera compared to Soldiers. The engine also allows nearly full environmental destruction. The developers have also improved the multiplayer options from the last game, with many more modes and options. The game was released in Russia and North America for PC in September 2006.

Game scenario writers include Alexander Zorich.

== Development ==
The game was developed using the GEM Engine, allowing more destructible items and better camera movement than its predecessor.

Ubisoft released a single player demo of the game in July 2006. A multiplayer demo was released a few days before the official release in September. Two patches were released for the game over December 2006 and January 2007.

A sequel Men of War was released in 2009 by 1C Company.

== Reception ==
Reception

Aggregate score
Aggregator	Score
Metacritic	67/100

Review scores
Publication	Score
Eurogamer	8/10
GameSpot	6/10
GamesRadar+	3/5
IGN	7/10
PALGN	5/10
PC Format	79%
PC Gamer (UK)	81%
PC Gamer (US)	46%
PC Zone	75%
VideoGamer.com	6/10

The game received "mixed or average reviews" according to video game review aggregator Metacritic. It won "Best of Show" at the 2006 Russian Game Developer's Conference.
