= Soldiers: Heroes of World War II =

2004 video game

- Developer: Best Way
- Publisher: Codemasters
- Series: Men of War
- Engine: GEM
- Platform: Microsoft Windows
- Release: NA: 29 June 2004; EU: 2 July 2004
- Genre: Real-time tactics
- Modes: Single-player, multiplayer

Soldiers: Heroes of World War II (Russian: В тылу врага, or Behind Enemy Lines) is the first in a series of real-time tactics video games set in World War II, developed by or under the supervision of Ukrainian company Best Way.

While the most widely distributed edition by Codemasters bears the name Soldiers: Heroes of World War II, its original English language title is Outfront.

The player can take control of American, British, Soviet or German forces to play out battles that are set in World War II. The game is primarily a strategy game, but the player can take control of his forces and direct them with the keyboard and mouse for additional depth of control.

Game scenario writers include Alexander Zorich.

== Gameplay ==
In the single player missions, players are generally allotted a very small number of soldiers, and losing just one soldier can be a huge loss. Thus, the game revolves around the player conserving soldiers and keeping them safe most of the time. The game simulates close combat military tactics, allowing the player to place soldiers behind cover and move them around all at once, yet also allowing the player to take control of the soldiers directly, enabling individual soldiers to accomplish much more advanced tasks, such as performing complex manoeuvres or sneaking through heavily fortified areas.

There are many types of vehicles, ranging from tanks to anti-aircraft vehicles to simple Jeeps. Any soldier can drive or man any position in a gun, which, while unrealistic, allows for many interesting gameplay implications.

Soldiers have inventories, which allow for the implementation of an ammunition system, as well as for soldiers to loot new or better weapons and grenades from dead enemies, as well as dead friendlies. Even vehicles have ammunition, which players can scavenge from disabled (but not destroyed) vehicles.

Another interesting side effect to using vehicles under direct control is that this allows the user to aim at specific points on enemy vehicles. A player can aim for an enemy tanks treads for example, which would prevent it from moving, but still allow it to fire. By doing this, a player can stop a tank from advancing, while creating a "dead zone" that soldiers cannot move in without getting attacked.

Aside from realistic locational damage on vehicles, the game offers a virtually completely destructible environment. This is especially taken advantage of when using a vehicle in direct control, in which a player can aim the turret and literally blow buildings apart.

Originally, the only way a player could play this game multiplayer was to play a cooperative game mode which took up to four players through any mission from the single player mode. The soldiers in each map were divided between the players, but otherwise this mode was exactly the same as single player. There was no server browser, and players were forced to directly connect by IP address to play.

In a more recent patch, players are able to play different multiplayer modes, including escort missions and king of the hill type scenarios. No in-game server browser was created, but a player could use GameSpy Arcade as a server browser.

On 20 January 2025, the game received a quality of life update on Steam. This update enabled the use of the Steam Workshop to upload mods, replaced the now-defunct Gamespy servers with Steam Network multiplayer support, and other graphical updates.

== Reception ==
Reception

Aggregate score
Aggregator	Score
Metacritic	77/100

Review scores
Publication	Score
Computer Gaming World	4/5
Game Informer	5/10
GameSpot	7.9/10
GameSpy	3/5
GameZone	7.9/10
IGN	8.5/10
PC Format	87%
PC Gamer (UK)	87%
PC Gamer (US)	83%
X-Play	3/5
The New York Times	(mixed)
The Sydney Morning Herald	3.5/5

The game received "favorable" reviews according to video game review aggregator Metacritic.

== Spin-offs ==
Outfront: Saboteurs (В тылу врага: Диверсанты) was released by 1C in 2005. Development was outsourced to studio Dark Fox, using Best Way's Heroes engine. Paradox Interactive acquired international rights from 1C in 2006 and renamed it Silent Heroes: Elite Troops of World War II, axing the original version's multiplayer in the process.

Outfront: Saboteurs 2 (В тылу врага: Диверсанты 2), developed by Dark Fox, followed in 2006. This product is unreleased outside of Eastern Europe.

Outfront: Saboteurs 3 (В тылу врага: Диверсанты 3), developed by Realore Studios, followed in 2008. This product is unreleased outside of Eastern Europe.

== Sequels ==
The first fully fledged sequel, Faces of War, appeared in 2006. Its intended international title was Outfront II, but that moniker was scrapped after a distribution deal was struck with Ubisoft. Rechristened Faces of War, the game was released on 12 September 2006.

The next installment in the series was a joint development between Best Way and German partners Digitalmindsoft. Russian publisher 1C marketed it as a two-part standalone expansion for Faces of War.
