= 1C Company =

Russian computer software developer

- Type: Private company
- Industry: Computer software, cloud computing, video games, business process outsourcing, education
- Founded: 1991; 35 years ago
- Headquarters: Moscow, Russia
- Key people: Boris Nuraliev (Founder & CEO) (1991–)
- Revenue: $650 million (2016)
- Website: 1c.ru 1c.com

1C Company (Russian: Фирма «1С», [ˈfʲirmə ɐˈdʲin ˈɛs]) is a Russian software developer, distributor and publisher based in Moscow. It develops, manufactures, licenses, supports and sells computer software, related services and video games.

In Russia, 1C develops and sells the business software suite 1C:Enterprise. 1C is also a video game developer and publisher. Titles produced by the company include IL-2 Sturmovik, King's Bounty II, Men of War and the Space Rangers series.

== History ==
1С was founded in 1991 by Boris Nuraliev in Moscow, Russia. In 1992, the company published ''1C:Accounting'' (ru), a bookkeeping software.

In 1999, the first game developed by 1C was published Konung: Legends of the North. 1C also acquired MaddoxGames company. In 2006, 1C announced that their trademark was considered "well-known" by Rospatent as an intellectual property status in Russia.

In May 2005, 1C bought Cenega (an abbreviation of "Central European games"), a Prague and Warsaw based publisher and distributor. This arm was rebranded to 1C Publishing EU in May 2007. 1C Publishing EU used the trade name 1C Entertainment from late 2018 until June 2022.

In 2008, 1C declared its plan of transforming into a large multisectoral holding company. Part of its growth strategy was establishing joint ventures with other enterprises within the IT industry. That same year, 1C declared it would become a holding company, stating it would establish joint ventures with companies within the IT industry. In October 2011, Baring Vostok Capital Fund acquired a 9% stake of 1C.

In 2009, 1C's sales network included 280 stores and licenses to distribute over 4,000 titles in 600 locations throughout the former Eastern Bloc. In February of that same year, 1C acquired SoftClub (the largest distributor of computer games in Russia).

In 2012, 1C partnered with 777 Studios to create 1C Game Studios. By 2015, according to the founder and head of the company Boris Nuraliev, the number of subsidiaries and joint ventures of 1C is about 200 companies.

In April 2016, 1C bought out 27.06% in Megaplan and increased its stake in the company to 99%. In August of the same year, a controlling stake was acquired in the restaurant business automation service Quick Resto. In October, 1C announced the purchase of a controlling stake in the developer of the cloud-based CRM system amoCRM. In September 2016, 1C together with ASCON, created the Renga Software company - the Russian developer of the Renga integrated BIM system.

In April 2022, 1C Poland was sanctioned by Poland to reduce the company's income and "thus indirectly reduces the revenues of the Russian Federation budget, from which aggression against Ukraine is financed." In May 2024, Ukraine's military intelligence agency claimed to have successfully carried out a cyberattack on the company, preventing Russian users from accessing business tools and databases.

== Operations ==
According to 1C the company provides its services through a network of partnerships consisting of more than 10,000 long-term partners in 25 countries.

One of the business strategies of 1C on the Russia IT market and several other countries is a franchising business model. About 7000 franchisees in 750 cities of Russia and neighboring countries provide comprehensive service for business automation, deployment, customization and support of 1C:Enterprise-based systems, consulting, user training, etc. More than 250 of them have certified its QoS as ISO 9001-compliant.

In 2017 it was reported that 1C maintained a sizeable lead in RBС's publication, for the «Top-50 most popular brands in Russia».

According to Forbes Russia's estimates, the company controls around 12% of the turnover generated by all franchise businesses in Russia.
