= List of Relic Entertainment games =

Video games by developer

Relic Entertainment is a Canadian video game developer based in Vancouver and founded in June 1997 by Alex Garden and Luke Moloney. After its debut title Homeworld (1999), the company developed two more games, Impossible Creatures (2003) and Homeworld 2 (2003), and signed a contract with publisher THQ for an additional two games. Before either game was released, however, Relic was bought by THQ in May 2004 for US$10.2 million in cash; the company was renamed THQ Canada, with "Relic Entertainment" used as a marketing brand by the studio. THQ published the next five games by the company. A few months after being purchased, Relic released its first licensed title, Warhammer 40,000: Dawn of War (2004). It released two more original titles in 2006, The Outfit and Company of Heroes, before transitioning to focus on further titles and expansion packs in the Warhammer 40,000 and Company of Heroes franchises.

In December 2012, THQ declared bankruptcy and began selling off its properties and subsidiary companies; THQ Canada was auctioned to Sega in January 2013, for US$26.6 million, along with the rights to the Company of Heroes franchise. The studio was then renamed back to Relic Entertainment. Since joining Sega, Relic released one more title in the Warhammer franchise and two more titles in the Company of Heroes franchise, all published by Sega, as well as Age of Empires IV. In March 2024, Relic left Sega to become an independent studio again, with plans to publish its own games.

== Games ==
List of games
Game	Details
Homeworld Original release date: September 28, 1999	Release years by system: 1999 – Windows; 2015 – macOS (Homeworld Remastered)
Homeworld Original release date: September 28, 1999	Notes: Real-time strategy game; Published by Sierra Studios; Part of the Homeworld series; One stand-alone expansion pack, Homeworld: Cataclysm (2000), developed by Barking Dog Studios and published by Sierra Studios; Remastered versions of the game and Homeworld 2 released as Homeworld Remastered Collection (2015) by Gearbox Software
Impossible Creatures Original release date: January 7, 2003	Release years by system: 2003 – Windows
Impossible Creatures Original release date: January 7, 2003	Notes: Real-time strategy game; Published by Microsoft Game Studios; Two downloadable content packs released: "Bonus Animals" (2003) and "Insect Invasion" (2004)
Homeworld 2 Original release date: September 16, 2003	Release years by system: 2003 – Windows; 2004 – macOS
Homeworld 2 Original release date: September 16, 2003	Notes: Real-time strategy game; Published by Sierra Studios; Part of the Homeworld series; Remastered versions of the game and Homeworld released as Homeworld Remastered Collection (2015) by Gearbox Software
Warhammer 40,000: Dawn of War Original release date: September 20, 2004	Release years by system: 2004 – Windows
Warhammer 40,000: Dawn of War Original release date: September 20, 2004	Notes: Real-time strategy game; Published by THQ; Part of the Warhammer 40,000 series; Three expansion packs released by THQ: Winter Assault (2005) and Dark Crusade (2006) developed by Relic, and Soulstorm (2008) by Iron Lore Entertainment; Remaster of the game and expansions published by Relic on August 13, 2025 as Warhammer 40,000: Dawn of War - Definitive Edition
The Outfit Original release date: March 13, 2006	Release years by system: 2006 – Xbox 360
The Outfit Original release date: March 13, 2006	Notes: Third-person shooter; Published by THQ
Company of Heroes Original release date: September 12, 2006	Release years by system: 2006 – Windows; 2007 – Mobile phones 2012 – macOS
Company of Heroes Original release date: September 12, 2006	Notes: Real-time strategy game; Published by THQ; Part of the Company of Heroes series; Two standalone expansion packs published by THQ: Opposing Fronts (2007) and Tales of Valor (2009); Original game and expansions included in Company of Heroes Complete: Campaign Edition (2012); Mobile phone version (2007) developed by Viva La Mobile and published by THQ; Direct-to-video film Company of Heroes (2013) based on the game produced by Destination Films and published by Sony Pictures Home Entertainment
Warhammer 40,000: Dawn of War II Original release date: February 19, 2009	Release years by system: 2009 – Windows; 2016 – macOS, Linux
Warhammer 40,000: Dawn of War II Original release date: February 19, 2009	Notes: Tactical role-playing game; Published by THQ; Part of the Warhammer 40,000 series; Two standalone expansion packs published by THQ: Chaos Rising (2010) and Retribution (2011), as well as smaller downloadable add-ons; Original game and expansion packs included in Warhammer 40,000: Dawn of War II Master Collection (2011), and with additional add-ons in Warhammer 40,000: Dawn of War II Grand Master Collection (2011)
Warhammer 40,000: Space Marine Original release date: September 6, 2011	Release years by system: 2011 – Windows, PlayStation 3, Xbox 360; 2025 – Windows, Xbox Series X/S (Master Crafted Edition)
Warhammer 40,000: Space Marine Original release date: September 6, 2011	Notes: Third-person shooter; Published by THQ; Part of the Warhammer 40,000 series; Remaster of the game released on June 10, 2025 by Sega and SneakyBox as Warhammer 40,000: Space Marine - Master Crafted Edition
Company of Heroes 2 Original release date: June 25, 2013	Release years by system: 2013 – Windows; 2015 – macOS, Linux
Company of Heroes 2 Original release date: June 25, 2013	Notes: Real-time strategy game; Published by Sega; Part of the Company of Heroes series; Three expansion packs published by Sega: The Western Front Armies (2014), Ardennes Assault (2014) and The British Forces (2015); Original game and expansions included in Company of Heroes 2: Master Collection
Warhammer 40,000: Dawn of War III Original release date: April 27, 2017	Release years by system: 2017 – Windows, macOS, Linux
Warhammer 40,000: Dawn of War III Original release date: April 27, 2017	Notes: Real-time strategy game; Published by Sega; Part of the Warhammer 40,000 series
Age of Empires IV Original release date: October 28, 2021	Release years by system: 2021 – Windows; 2023 – Xbox One, Xbox Series X/S
Age of Empires IV Original release date: October 28, 2021	Notes: Real-time strategy game; Published by Xbox Game Studios; Co-developed with World's Edge; Part of the Age of Empires series
Company of Heroes 3 Original release date: February 23, 2023	Release years by system: 2023 – Windows, PlayStation 5, Xbox Series X/S
Company of Heroes 3 Original release date: February 23, 2023	Notes: Real-time strategy game; Published by Sega; Part of the Company of Heroes series
Earth vs Mars Original release date: October 29, 2025	Release years by system: 2025 – Windows
Earth vs Mars Original release date: October 29, 2025	Notes: Turn based strategy game; Self-published under the Relic Labs label

=== Cancelled ===
Game	Details
Company of Heroes Online Cancellation date: March 31, 2011	Proposed system release: N/A
Company of Heroes Online Cancellation date: March 31, 2011	Notes: Massively multiplayer online real-time strategy game; Part of the Company of Heroes series; Shut down during beta testing before launch
Warhammer 40,000: Space Marine 2 Cancellation date: January 22, 2013	Proposed system release: N/A
Warhammer 40,000: Space Marine 2 Cancellation date: January 22, 2013	Notes: Part of the Warhammer 40,000 series; Planned sequel to Warhammer 40,000: Space Marine; Project cancelled before development officially started when THQ sold Relic and abandoned rights to the Warhammer 40,000 franchise; The name was reused a decade later for a new project, developed by Saber Interactive and published by Focus Entertainment in 2024
