= Warhammer 40,000: Dawn of War IV =

- Developer: King Art Games
- Publisher: Deep Silver
- Director: Jan Theysen
- Designer: Elliott Verbiest
- Writer: John French
- Series: Warhammer 40,000
- Engine: Unity
- Platform: Windows
- Release: December 3, 2026
- Genre: Real-time strategy
- Modes: Single-player, multiplayer

Warhammer 40,000: Dawn Of War IV is an upcoming real-time strategy video game developed by King Art Games and published by Deep Silver. The fourth installment in the Warhammer 40,000: Dawn of War series, the game is set to be released for Windows PC via Steam on December 3, 2026.

== Gameplay ==
Dawn of War IV is a real-time strategy video game played from a top-down perspective. The game is set on Kronus, the setting of Dark Crusade. At launch, the game features four factions (Space Marines, Adeptus Mechanicus, Necrons, and Orks), each with distinct abilities and unique campaigns. In certain segments, players must make critical decisions that alter the course of the campaign, meaning some missions appear only when players make different choices in a subsequent playthrough. Additional modes include Skirmish and Last Stand, a mode returning from Dawn of War II. The campaign can be played cooperatively with another player, and the game offers three competitive multiplayer modes (1v1, 2v2, and 3v3).

In each mission, players command various units to engage in direct confrontations with other factions and complete objectives. Players must construct and reinforce their base, capture requisition points to expand operations, and allocate resources for research, recruiting soldiers, and deploying units. The game features a cover system that allows units to take less damage when positioned behind cover and an expanded Sync Kill system, which synchronizes melee animations between opposing units in combat. By accumulating resources, players can use powerful abilities named stratagems; for instance, the Space Marines can call in an orbital bombardment to obliterate another faction's units and bases. Units can be extensively customized using the game's "Painter" tool.

== Development ==
Unlike previous games in the series, which were developed by Relic Entertainment, Dawn of War IV is currently being developed by German studio King Art Games, best known for developing Iron Harvest. According to Jan Theysen, the game's creative director, Games Workshop invited the studio to pitch for a potential installment in the Dawn of War series during the development of Iron Harvest.

The original Dawn of War game and its focus on large-scale, drawn-out battles were a major source of inspiration for the game. King Art also wanted to modernize the franchise, introducing the "combat director", which is an evolution of the original game's Sync Kill system. Last Stand from Dawn of War II returns in the game, though it was designed to be less "hero-centric and "less MOBA-like". John French was hired to write the game's story. Set 200 years after the original game and its expansion, Dark Crusade, Dawn of War IV continues the story of Cyrus and Jonah as they return to Kronus and attempt to rebuild their chapter. The time jump allows the team to use the updated version of Warhammer 40,000 as their setting, though the narrative was largely self-contained, with little to no effects on the wider world. While Orks and Space Marines were featured prominently in previous games in the series, Adeptus Mechanicus were added because they had never appeared in previous Dawn of War games, while Necrons were added because they were briefly teased at the end of Dawn of War III.

Dawn of War IV was announced at Gamescom in August 2025. Originally set to be released on September 17, 2026, the game was delayed to December 3 the same year. Players who purchased the Commander Edition can access the game on November 30. King Art Games planned to support the game with downloadable content packs, and introduce a fifth playable faction and a campaign extension during its first year of release.
