= Warhammer 40,000: Dawn of War II – Retribution =

- Developers: Relic Entertainment, Feral Interactive (Linux, Mac OS X)
- Publishers: THQ (former); Sega (current)
- Producer: Jeff Lydell
- Designer: Daniel Kading
- Programmers: Beau Brennen; Stephen North
- Artist: Michael J. Moore
- Composer: Doyle W. Donehoo
- Series: Warhammer 40,000
- Engine: Essence Engine 2.0
- Platforms: Windows, Linux, Mac OS X
- Release: Windows; March 1, 2011; Linux, Mac OS X September 29, 2016
- Genres: Tactical role-playing game, real-time tactics, real-time strategy
- Modes: Single-player, multiplayer

Warhammer 40,000: Dawn of War II – Retribution is the stand-alone second expansion to Warhammer 40,000: Dawn of War II, part of the Warhammer 40,000: Dawn of War series of real-time strategy video games. Set in Games Workshop's Warhammer 40,000 fictional universe, the single player campaign is playable with multiple races.

Imperial Guard is introduced as a new faction, and all races including the races from the original game and the first expansion (the Eldar, the Space Marines, Chaos, the Orks and the Tyranids) are playable in single-player.

== Gameplay ==
=== Campaign ===
Dawn of War II: Retribution offers a campaign for every race, including the Imperial Guard. The campaign takes place across Sub-sector Aurelia, which appeared in the previous two games. The worlds include the jungle world Typhon Primaris, the desert world Calderis, and the hive world Meridian from Dawn of War II; the arctic world Aurelia and the derelict ship Judgment of Carrion from Chaos Rising; and the dead world of Cyrene, mentioned in the original Dawn of War as having been subjected to Exterminatus (complete sterilization of all life on a planet corrupted by Chaos or alien influences) by Blood Ravens Captain Gabriel Angelos.

=== Setting ===
Dawn of War II: Retribution takes place ten years after events of Chaos Rising. Sub-sector Aurelia is now suffering from conflict between Ork pirates called the Freebootaz led by Kaptin Bluddflagg to pillage the sub-sector, the arrival of the Eldar of the Craftworld Alaitoc led by Autarch Kayleth to seek about a prophecy and recovering an ancient artifact, a Tyranid Hive Lord restoring the remnants of the Hive Fleet Leviathan and to the link of the Hive Mind, the Blood Ravens defending the sub-sector led by Captain Apollo Diomedes to hunt down Chaos as well as investigating their Chapter Master, Azariah Kyras, for being corrupted by Chaos, the return of Chaos Space Marines of the Black Legion led by Eliphas the Inheritor to fulfill his promise to Abaddon the Despoiler to annihilate the Blood Ravens, and the newly arriving Imperial Guard of the 8th Cadian Regiment led by Lord General Castor, performing an Exterminatus under Inquisitor Adrastia to investigate for corruption within Sub-sector Aurelia as well as the Blood Ravens' Chapter Master Azariah Kyras. These events may have been caused by Gabriel Angelos' actions (from the original Dawn of War game) when he destroyed the Maledictum, a Chaos stone containing the bound essence of a daemon of Khorne, with the hammer "God-Splitter".

=== Multiplayer ===
The Imperial Lord General will be added to the current selection of The Last Stand heroes as well as new environment and new waves of enemies. It can also update all the previous heroes from Dawn of War II and Chaos Rising by importing the Games for Windows account to the Steam Account.

The Last Standalone is a stand-alone version of the Retribution version of The Last Stand. It was released on April 20, 2011, as a separate Steam purchase. Owners of The Last Standalone receive a discount on the full version of -Dawn of War II: Retribution.

Multiplayer will introduce base building to a small degree, as well as every race getting a Global Ability Advance Unit. Retribution is a stand-alone title and does not require ownership of earlier games in the series to use any of the factions in multiplayer.

== Plot ==
The player's character arrives on Typhon Primaris engaging and battling an opposing faction and defeating their leader. (Space Marines vs. Chaos, Eldar vs. Orks, and Imperial Guard vs. Tyranids). The player is informed that the Imperial Inquisition has deemed the sector beyond redemption, and will be arriving soon to perform Exterminatus on all the inhabitable worlds in the area. Later, the faction leader is given the objective to eliminate Azariah Kyras who intends to use the impending Exterminatus as a sacrifice to Khorne and ascend to daemonhood as a deamon prince. The motivation varies depending on the player's faction, as the Space Marines, Imperial Guard and Eldar wish to oppose Chaos, their ancient evil enemy; the warlike Orks simply want a good fight and to crush the strongest foes they can find; the Tyranid splinter wishes to overrun the sector and summon a new hive fleet (that is, a vast coordinated swarm of various Tyranid organisms, capable of travelling between star systems) to consume all the biomass; the Chaos faction are Kyras' rivals and wish to surpass him. Regardless, it is deemed by the player faction that Kyras must die. The player's characters quickly attempt to secure a means of transport off Typhon, escaping a local cult along the way.

Arriving on Calderis, the player character fights against Kyras' Chaos-corrupted Blood Ravens Space Marines, operating under orders to purge the planet. After destroying a Warp portal on Aurelia, the faction learns of an attack on Meridian ordered by Kyras and arrives there killing the traitor guardsmen and uncovering a transmission from Kyras revealing his location on Typhon.

The player character returns to Typhon Primaris to confront Kyras himself, only to be ambushed by Eldar from Craftworld Biel-Tan. Wary of a ritual they are carrying out, the player's faction kills the Eldar there. Following this, Kyras reveals that the Eldar ritual was preventing the Imperial Inquisition fleet from reaching the sub-sector. The Inquisition fleet arrives, beginning Exterminatus on Typhon Primaris. The player's characters escape Typhon before the Exterminatus finishes. A cyclonic torpedo reduces Typhon to ash.

Finding themselves on the space hulk (a huge conglomeration of drifting space-borne detritus consisting of many wrecked ships) known as the Judgment of Carrion, the player's characters recover, and find their determination to stop Kyras. It is deduced that he is hiding on Cyrene, as the planet has already undergone Exterminatus decades ago, and therefore the Inquisition will not travel there to perform Exterminatus again. On Cyrene, the player's faction launches an attack against a joint alliance of Chaos Space Marines, corrupt Imperial Guardsmen and traitor Blood Ravens by using their most powerful unit against them. Kyras begins to ascend into daemonhood. Gabriel and his 3rd Company launch an attack on Kyras' forces while Gabriel's own command unit confronts the daemon prince himself; however they are defeated by Kyras. The player's faction then launches their own attack, ultimately successfully killing Kyras.

=== Ending ===
After Kyras´ death the game campaign ends and the epilogue differs for each of the playable factions:

- Chaos – Eliphas allows the Exterminatus to continue, thus sacrificing the sector to Khorne. Because of this, he is transformed and elevated to the status of a daemon prince by the Blood God, usurping Kyras' place.
- Eldar – Ronahn defeats his enemies and recovers the spiritstone containing the spirit of his twin sister, the Farseer Taldeer (which is in the possession of Kyras after she was slain following the events of Dark Crusade), and decides to return to Craftworld Ulthwé with her. This ending is confirmed as canon (as a sort of composite with the Space Marines ending) in Dawn of War III, where Taldeer and Ronahn both return, the former as a Wraithknight.
- Imperial Guard – Inquisitor Adrastia returns to the Inquisition to suspend the Exterminatus on sub-sector Aurelia, by presenting Kyras' psychic hood as proof that the threat has ended, while Lord General Castor and Sergeant Major Merrick commend each other for their exemplary actions rather backhandedly.
- Orks – Inquisitor Adrastia attempts to renege the deal between her and Kaptin Bluddflagg with assassination. Unfortunately, Kaptin Bluddflagg catches her off guard and takes her hat, which he wanted in their deal. Following that, he claims the Judgment of Carrion as his new Krooza, and uses it to leave the subsector.
- Space Marines – Captain Diomedes contacts Inquisitor Adrastia to halt the Exterminatus. The Chapter is then purged of any remaining chaos taint and Gabriel Angelos, after being revived from the brink of death and rebuilt with bionics, is appointed as the new Chapter Master. This appears to be the canonical ending, as corroborated by other Warhammer 40,000 materials: a squad of Blood Ravens appears in Warhammer 40,000: Space Marine, in which their victory in the conflict in Aurelia is mentioned; meanwhile, the exact course of events of the successful Blood Ravens campaign in Retribution is likewise mentioned in some publications, such as Fantasy Flight Games' "Deathwatch: Honour the Chapter" supplement for the Deathwatch pen-and-paper roleplaying game. In Dawn of War III, the rebuilt Gabriel Angelos returns as Chapter Master of the Blood Ravens and Diomedes was made a Chaplain and Jonah Orion was made chief advisor. Meanwhile, at least a portion of the Eldar ending is considered canon as Ronahn managed to retrieve his sister's spiritstone before the two are waylaid by Kyre during their return trip to Ulthwé.
- Tyranids – The Hive Tyrant's psychic strength summons a Hive Fleet, that launches a surprise attack and consumes the entire sub-sector, resulting in a 94% casualty rate for the Imperial Guard forces and the complete annihilation of the Blood Ravens, who refused to retreat.

== Development ==
On September 15, 2010 Relic Entertainment announced that Retribution would be dropping the Games for Windows – Live multiplayer platform in favor of using Steamworks as its primary and only platform., and the new multiplayer platform does not communicate with the old Live platform. This makes the game entirely stand-alone with all the races included (unlike Chaos Rising, which required the original Dawn of War II to use the original four races in multiplayer). Plot-wise, two playable characters (Cyrus and Tarkus) have been carried over from the original campaigns. A new multiplayer matchmaking service was developed for Retribution. The addition of Steamworks also allows inviting Steam friends directly to multiplayer matches as well as free-to-play multiplayer weekends and a much faster patching process.

There were speculations that the new playable race would be Imperial Guard and/or the Inquisition, due to the Inquisition's triple-lined "I" used in the word "Retribution" in the game trailer; in addition, the expansion's wishlist icon in the Steam system features a female Witch Hunter Inquisitor. On December 21, 2010, the German PC gaming magazine Gamestar revealed the new race would be the Imperial Guard.

A multiplayer beta of the game was launched on Steam on February 1, 2011, and ended on February 25.

== Release ==
Specific race packs were released for each of the six races within the campaign, containing special items for that race in the campaign of Retribution, such as armour, weapons and accessories. The Ork race pack is a Steam exclusive and Tyranid pack a THQ online store exclusive, although all were made available as DLC after release, and all come in the Dawn of War II: Retribution Collector's Edition retail box.

Wargear packs were also released for The Last Stand multiplayer mode. Each pack added new wargear to a specific hero class.

There were also two DLC packs released adding new sub-races to use in multiplayer game with unique models and color schemes for units: Dark Angels Space Marine chapter and Eldar Craftworld Ulthwe. Similar DLC pack adding the Ultramarines Space Marine chapter was released on August 16, 2011.

The Tau Crisis Suit Commander is another hero for Last Stand mode available by download.

== Reception ==
Reception

Aggregate scores
Aggregator	Score
GameRankings	81.65%
Metacritic	80/100

Review scores
Publication	Score
Destructoid	8.5/10
Eurogamer	8/10
Game Informer	7.75/10
GameSpot	8.5/10
GamesRadar+	4/5
IGN	8.5/10
PC Gamer (US)	88/100

The game received generally positive reviews upon release. It received an aggregated score of 81.65% on GameRankings based on 36 reviews and 80/100 on Metacritic based on 52 reviews.

Destructoid and Eurogamer acknowledged that while the story had experienced a drop in quality from the base game, the mechanics it carried over from Dawn of War II were perfectly executed. Game Informer said that Retribution was a "mediocre expansion pack even though the base gameplay [was] still quite good", and recommended Chaos Rising instead. GameSpot praised the addition of the Imperial Guard faction, new races, and more diverse gameplay and noted that technical issues marred the Imperial Guard campaign. GamesRadar commended the more intense battles and value for money while criticizing the clunky UI, repetitive campaign, and long loading times. IGN appreciated how the title paid homage to Warhammer lore and added replay value through the addition of new races. PC Gamer called Dawn of War II "an essential purchase" and lauded its revitalization of the tactical gameplay of the base game.

During the 15th Annual Interactive Achievement Awards, the Academy of Interactive Arts & Sciences nominated Dawn of War II - Retribution for "Strategy/Simulation Game of the Year".

== Sequel ==
A few months after Retribution's release, Relic revealed that work had begun on a sequel.

Shortly before THQ's filing for bankruptcy in December 2012, Sega secured a licensing deal agreement with Games Workshop. Sega then purchased Relic Entertainment from THQ in January 2013. This made a future of the sequel uncertain and, in May 2014, Relic would not comment on its status.

However, in September 2015, Relic opened up a new web page featuring Dawn of War III. In October 2015, PC Games News wrote that they expected Dawn of War III to be released in 2016. Dawn of War III was displayed at E3 2016 and was released on April 27, 2017.
