= Warhammer 40,000: Dawn of War III =

2017 video game

- Developer: Relic Entertainment
- Publisher: Sega (Note: Originally published by Sega. Currently self-published by Relic Entertainment after split from Sega.)
- Director: Philippe Boulle
- Producer: Lee McKinnon Pederson
- Writers: Kyle Berndt; Adam Bullied
- Composer: Paul Leonard-Morgan
- Series: Warhammer 40,000
- Engine: Essence Engine 4.0
- Platforms: Windows, macOS, Linux
- Release: Windows; April 27, 2017 macOS, Linux; June 8, 2017
- Genre: Real-time strategy
- Modes: Single-player, multiplayer

Warhammer 40,000: Dawn of War III is a 2017 real-time strategy game with multiplayer online battle arena influences, developed by Relic Entertainment and published by Sega. It is the third mainline entry in the Dawn of War series, and the first new release in the series since Dawn of War II: Retribution in 2011. It was released for Windows on April 27, 2017. Feral Interactive released macOS and Linux versions on June 8 the same year. A successor, Warhammer 40,000: Dawn of War IV, developed by King Art Games, is set to be released in 2026.

== Gameplay ==
The factions available for play are the Space Marines of the Imperium of Man, the Eldar and the Orks (all of whom have appeared in the earlier games of the series). Other non playable factions in-game include the Imperial Guard as well as the Daemons of Khorne while the Necrons make a brief cameo in the epilogue. In the multiplayer game, various skins are available for the three factions, different chapters for the Space Marines, alternate craftworlds for the Eldar, and different clans for the Orks.

== Plot ==
A "catastrophic weapon," known as the Spear of Khaine, is discovered on the lost planet Acheron, and three forces converge on the planet – the Blood Ravens Space Marines under legendary warrior and Chapter Master Gabriel Angelos, the Eldar led by Farseer Macha (with both heroes returning from the first game), and an Ork horde led by Warboss Gorgutz (his fourth appearance, after Winter Assault, Dark Crusade, and Soulstorm).

The campaign begins on the Imperial Knight world of Cyprus Ultima, which is under siege from a massive Ork horde led by Warboss Gitstompa. For reasons unknown, the Imperial Inquisitor Holt has ordered the Imperial Navy to blockade the planet and denies Lady Solaria's Imperial Knight House Varlock any reinforcements planetside. The Blood Ravens under Chapter Master Gabriel Angelos run the blockade to help Lady Solaria, but not before Varlock Keep is looted by Lieutenant Gorgutz. Gitstompa uses the looted parts to build an enormous cannon capable of defeating the Eldar.

Autarch Kyre, the leader of the Biel-Tan warhost on Cyprus Ultima, summons Farseer Macha to aid him against the Orks there. Kyre is using Cyprus Ultima as a staging ground to travel to the planet Acheron when it emerges from the alternate dimension of the Warp. Kyre is obsessed with the Spear of Khaine, named after the lost Eldar god of war and said to be able to kill enemies with a single blow. He seized the Spirit Stone of Farseer Taldeer (Dark Crusade) from her twin brother, the Eldar Ranger Ronahn (Retribution). While in his custody, Taldeer unwittingly told Kyre of the prophecy surrounding the Spear of Khaine. In a trance, she prophecised that the wayfarers would be called forth by the Spear of Khaine and united by the Storm Prince. Convinced that he is the Storm Prince destined to unite the fractured and nomadic Eldar, the power-hungry Autarch secretly keeps her prisoner as a way to swell his own ranks of his Swordwind army through using her as a puppet. Unable to communicate with anyone, Taldeer is effectively isolated from any help. Farseer Macha, however, does not trust Kyre, and secretly begins to build an insurgency with the aid of Ronahn, who pretended to cooperate with Kyre as his spymaster, and Jain Zar, Phoenix Lord of the Howling Banshees.

One detachment of Eldar forces assault the Imperial Starfort Helios where Blood Ravens Librarian Jonah Orion is studying an Eldar artifact, but Gabriel Angelos and his Space Marines arrive in time to rescue the Librarian, although at the cost of critically damaging the Starfort. The Inquisitor is incensed at the damage done and Gabriel orders Chaplain Diomedes (Retribution) to stay with his detachment on Helios to defend it and oversee repairs.

Back on Cyprus Ultima, Gitstompa's cannon is sabotaged by Gorgutz, and it explodes just as he is about to engage Macha's forces, who overrun him. With Gitstompa defeated, Gorgutz quickly subjugates Gitstompa's other subordinates. Gorgutz forms a new warband with them and begins preparations to travel to Acheron, which he heard about after battling the Eldar in the Kaurava system.

Farseer Macha and her forces prepare to assault the Blood Ravens on Cyprus Ultima and nearly kill both Librarian Orion and Gabriel Angelos when a meteor shower interrupts the battle, heralding the arrival of the planet Acheron.

Gorgutz seizes the opportunity to crash his spaceship into another Starfort and overwhelms the defending Blood Ravens before landing on Acheron. Helios crashes on Acheron's outer shell when it emerges from the Warp. Gabriel Angelos and a squad of Terminators boards the Starfort to administer last rites to Chaplain Diomedes, but end up rescuing him from the Eldar and Orks attacking him in the wreckage of Helios.

Farseer Macha and Ronahn manage to have an audience with Gorgutz (after killing many of his troops) and convince him to fight Kyre in an effort to derail Kyre from getting to the true surface of Acheron where the Spear is kept. Learning of the Spear on Acheron from Macha, Gorgutz wants the spear for himself. Ronahn leads Gorgutz straight to Kyre's outposts and Gorgutz kills Wraithlord Valador. While Kyre is preoccupied fighting Gorgutz's forces, Macha, Jain Zar, and a handful of Striking Scorpions raid Kyre's main base where the Spirit Stone of Farseer Taldeer is kept. Macha's strike group barely escapes with the aid of sympathizers within Kyre's ranks as well as a surprise attack from a detachment of Gorgutz's Orks.

Meanwhile, Gabriel Angelos has tracked Gorgutz's warband all the way to the Vault, one of the many passageways to Acheron's true surface below its outer shell. He destroys Wazmakka's cannon that was brought there to break open the vault. The Inquisitor orders the orbital bombardment of the Vault despite Angelos being in the immediate vicinity of it, in an attempt to destroy it and cut off any access to the Spear. The Imperial orbital bombardment does not have the intended effect of sealing the Vault, but rather, breaks it open. Kyre sees the destruction of The Vault as an opportunity to lead his forces down to the true surface of Acheron. Enraged, Librarian Orion and Chaplain Diomedes swears vengeance on the Inquisitor for (seemingly) killing the Chapter Master and opening the way for Kyre. It is not until Lady Solaria informs them of news of Angelos' survival from Inquisitor Horst that they shift priorities towards regrouping with Angelos on the surface instead.

Macha and Ronahn make an unsettling discovery on Acheron - they come across an enormous Greater Daemon of Khorne - a Bloodthirster, trapped in the ice, but attempting to awaken. The Bloodthirster was sealed there by the ancient Eldar eons ago. Kyre also discovers the Daemon but thinks the Spear of Khaine should be used to kill the daemon. Taldeer, Ronahn, and Macha aren't so sure, and think the Spear is nothing more than a trap and decide to cut all ties with Kyre in order to save their people. When they attempt to flee via the Colossus Gates, Kyre locks down their escape routes. Taldeer orders Ronahn to place her Spirit Stone in a Wraithknight and to pilot her new mechanical body to help break down the Colossus Gates' locks. Knowing that only twins, one dead and one living, can pilot a Wraithknight, Ronahn reluctantly complies despite his objections to risking her life again. They flee to another section of Acheron away from Kyre's forces.

Gabriel Angelos and his Blood Ravens, along with Lady Solaria and her Imperial Knight walker, arrive at the Temple of the Spear of Khaine and overrun Kyre's forces as well as a portion of Gorgutz's forces, but Gorgutz exacts his revenge with the help of Big Mek Wazmakka's Beauty the Morkanaut, defeating one of Kyre's Wraithknights and one of Solaria's Imperial Knights.

With Taldeer explaining that the prophecy was unclear and her vision partially obscured, both Macha and Taldeer meditate and try to clearly decipher the contents of the prophecy. Meanwhile, both Kyre and Gorgutz arrive at the altar of the Spear and Kyre quickly bests the Ork Warboss. Kyre takes the Spear and attempts to kill Gorgutz with it. Unfortunately, it is revealed the prophecy regarding the Spear was a trap to free the Daemon. The "Spear's" main blade shatters without harming Gorgutz, and Kyre is consumed in a blood sacrifice that releases the Bloodthirster from the ice. Now freed, the Bloodthirster becomes empowered by the countless lives taken on and around the planet for millennia - lives slain all in pursuit of the "Spear."

All three factions - Eldar, Space Marines, and Orks are stuck battling Warp Spawn generated by the Daemon using echoes of the warriors slain on the planet. Farseer Macha tasks Gorgutz with destroying the Chaos Spires that are powering the Daemon and generating the Warp Spawn. Meanwhile, Macha urges Gabriel Angelos to sacrifice his Battle Barge, the Dauntless - helmed by Captain Balthazar, to cripple the Daemon by ramming it into a fissure on the planet's surface; sacrificing the lives onboard but would destroy the Daemon. Knowing the Daemon was shielding Acheron, Angelos reluctantly complies and the Dauntless crashes directly into one of Acheron's tectonic faultlines; disintegrating the planet. Before the Dauntless impacted, Macha teleported Gorgutz and Angelos to safety.

With Acheron fragmented and destroyed, the Daemon diminishes in size and power. With the urging of Macha, who believe the prophecy predicted all three factions (all of whom are nomadic "wayfarers") must work together to defeat the Daemon, now revealed to be the Storm Prince, the three heroes team up to defeat the Daemon after battling through hordes of Warp Spawn on the fragment of the planet housing the Temple of the Spear. All three heroes warily part ways after defeating the Daemon, but Gorgutz stays back and grabs the Spear for himself as a trophy before leaving.

In an after credits scene, a Necron Overlord has taken notice of the events on Acheron and prepares his armies.

== Development ==
The game was announced in May 2016, seven years after the release of Dawn of War II. According to the game's executive producer, Stephen MacDonald, elements from both of the previous Dawn of War games would be featured in Dawn of War III.

== Release ==
Three retail editions of the game were released: the "Standard Edition" containing the base game; the "Limited Edition" containing the base game along with a premium disc book, lenticular art card and the official soundtrack; and a "Collector's Edition" containing all the contents of the "Limited Edition" along with a replica of the Godsplitter Daemon Hammer, three mounted cloth faction banners and the Masters of War skin pack.

The macOS and Linux ports of the game, developed by Feral Interactive, while able to be played in their own network, are unable to communicate with the original Windows version, which resulted in a divide in the small playerbase shortly after release. Similarly, other games by Relic, also running on the Essence Engine and ported to other platforms by Feral, have featured a separate network for Unix-based systems. The Linux version uses both the OpenGL and Vulkan graphics APIs, while the macOS port uses Apple's Metal.

In February 2018, ten months after release, gaming media outlets published that Relic would stop active development of the game. Relic developers confirmed these claims the same day while promising to maintain game servers and forums online. Their official statement mentions the game did not meet expectations at launch nor during the course of its life.

== Related media ==
A companion novel by the same name was written by Robbie MacNiven and released on April 18, 2017. In addition, a four part comic series began serialization by Titan Comics on April 19, 2017.

== Reception ==
Reception

Aggregate score
Aggregator	Score
Metacritic	77%

Review scores
Publication	Score
Destructoid	7.5/10
Game Informer	7.8/10
GameRevolution	3.5/5
GameSpot	8/10
IGN	7.6/10
Polygon	8/10

GameSpot awarded Warhammer 40,000: Dawn of War III a score of 8.0 out of 10, saying "Dawn of War III builds and maintains an organic tension that yields huge pay-offs, and there's nothing else quite like it." Destructoid awarded it 7.5 out of 10, saying: "Not everything works (especially the strict adherence to the core concept), but it's still very much both a Warhammer and a Dawn of War joint." Hardcore Gamer awarded it 4.5 out of 5, saying: "Warhammer 40,000: Dawn of War III successfully takes the best elements from the previous two games and blends them with traditional RTS mechanics to create a game with deep strategic gameplay." IGN scored the game as 7.6/10, noting that "Relic deserves credit for not simply remaking the same game with prettier graphics, but this hybrid approach doesn't feel as strong as Dawn of War 2's memorable tactical focus."

== Sequel ==
A sequel titled Warhammer 40,000: Dawn of War IV developed by King Art Games and published by Deep Silver, is set to be released in 2026.
