= Warhammer 40,000: Dawn of War II =

2009 video game

- Developer: Relic Entertainment (Note: Ported to Mac OS X and Linux by Feral Interactive)
- Publisher: THQ (Note: Originally published by THQ. Publishing rights picked up by Sega in 2013 upon THQ's bankruptcy. Currently self-published by Relic Entertainment after split from Sega.)
- Producer: Mark Noseworthy
- Designer: Jonny Ebbert
- Programmers: George Hornmoen; Ryan Haksi
- Artists: Roland Longpre; Claudio Alvaro; Nathan Hocken
- Composer: Doyle W. Donehoo
- Series: Warhammer 40,000
- Engine: Essence Engine 2.0
- Platforms: Windows, Linux, Mac OS X
- Release: Windows: NA: February 19, 2009; EU: February 20, 2009; Linux, Mac OS X: WW: September 29, 2016
- Genres: Tactical role-playing, real-time tactics, real-time strategy
- Modes: Single-player, multiplayer

Warhammer 40,000: Dawn of War II is a real-time tactics and tactical role-playing video game based on Games Workshop's fictional Warhammer 40,000 universe, developed by Relic Entertainment and published by THQ for Microsoft Windows. It is the sequel to Warhammer 40,000: Dawn of War.

Dawn of War II was released in North America on February 19, 2009, and in Europe on February 20, 2009, with two expansions Chaos Rising and Retribution being released in 2010 and 2011, respectively. A sequel, Dawn of War III, developed by Relic and published by Sega, was released in April 2017.

== Gameplay ==
Playable armies at the initial release of the game include the Space Marines, Orks, Eldar, and Tyranids. The Chaos Space Marines and the Imperial Guard were later added to the game through its two expansion packs.

The gameplay of Dawn of War II is markedly different from that of Dawn of War and its expansions. Building bases is completely removed. Jonny Ebbert, the game's lead designer, describes the feel of the game by saying that it "takes everything that was great about the original and combines it with the best that Company of Heroes had to offer." There is a heavier focus on utilizing cover, which gives more substantial defensive bonuses. Accordingly, there is also new emphasis on methods of dealing with units in cover. Some weapons, such as grenades and other explosives, can destroy cover, while others, such as flamers, ignore cover bonuses completely. Other differences between Dawn of War II and its predecessors include improved unit AI (squads under fire seek cover, for example), more realistically sized vehicles, and an improved physics engine, though the AI is easy to manipulate, by means such as placing suppression squads which the AI will instantly know have been placed and avoid, thus allowing to funnel the army to the player's needs. This game also includes a fall back command which the AI will use somewhat liberally, making the squad or command unit fall back at a higher speed and become resistant to range damage while being more vulnerable to melee.

As a Games for Windows - Live game, the game uses the Achievements system from Xbox Live, and is the first widely released, PC-exclusive game to use it. Because of this, a player must be able to connect to the Windows Live servers in order to access the game's multiplayer features. The game also requires authentication via Steam. On June 17, 2014, an optional update was released that removes Games for Windows – Live and the defunct GameSpy multiplayer servers for Steam solutions, including Steam Cloud.

=== Campaign ===
Dawn of War II features a non-linear interplanetary campaign, playable as the Space Marines. The campaign can be played either as single-player or cooperatively with another player through an online connection.

The game's campaign departs from those of its predecessors in several key features. One of the most notable departures is that there are no base-building elements, unlike in previous Dawn of War titles. Instead, the player chooses the units to be used prior to beginning a mission, cannot build new units once the mission begins, and has only limited reinforcement options.

A major part of the campaign lies in choosing which battles and even planets to fight in, and there are consequences regarding which missions are chosen. There may be multiple distress calls to answer, for example, each available for only a limited duration. Once a mission is chosen, the player may still have to choose between various objectives, having to decide between saving civilians or obtaining a powerful piece of wargear, for example.

Once a war zone and mission is selected, the player chooses only four squads to take part in the coming battle. Each squad is unique in its combat specialty, personality, and even the voice acting of its squad leader or sergeant. There is a strong narrative focus on the sergeants of these squads who can increase in experience and skills as the campaign progresses, and cannot ultimately be killed. Rather than dying in a mission, squad leaders are "knocked out" and can be revived either by a friendly unit in close proximity or upon completing the mission.

The campaign includes many elements traditionally associated with role-playing games. Squad leaders and commander units can be equipped with the wargear which is gathered from battlefields and slain enemies and by accomplishing objectives during missions. Throughout the campaign, as a Space Marine kills enemies and achieves objectives, he gains experience, "levels up", learns new abilities, and gains bonuses.

=== Squads ===
Force Commander: The player-named Force Commander (named Aramus in the novelization, addressed simply as "Commander" by characters in-game) serves as the player character, he leads the strike force throughout the game and is the one "squad" that always deploys. The youngest Force Commander in the history of the Blood Ravens, he earned a reputation for his ability to command in situations that would have broken other leaders. The Force Commander is never heard speaking outside of battle, where he can be heard shouting the generic battle cry "For the Emperor!" when using the "Rally!" ability, making him an almost silent protagonist. The character is the most versatile one, and can be customized to fulfill most roles. He can use almost any weapon and equipment, save for a few squad-specific items.

Tarkus: Tarkus leads a squad of 3 Tactical Marines, who fulfill the "tank" role by drawing enemy fire and soaking up damage. Tarkus can wield a variety of ranged weapons, from the default bolters to plasma guns and flamers, and his squadmates can be upgraded to use plasma weapons as well. With investment in the "Melee" skill tree, the Tactical Marines can switch to close range weapon, but that reduces their ranged capabilities. The Tactical Marines are potentially the most durable squad and a great addition in any mission, and later in the game even capable of utilizing Terminator armor. A veteran of countless battles, Tarkus' professional, confident, seen-it-all demeanor makes him a model Space Marine Sergeant.

Avitus: Avitus leads a Devastator heavy weapon squad of himself and 2 other Tactical Marines, and is specialized in laying suppressive fire upon enemies to reduce their movement and firing accuracy. The squad members use a default heavy bolter covered by two regular bolters, and Avitus can switch to missile launchers or a plasma cannon when enemy heavy vehicles are expected. Devastator squad ranks highest in terms of raw damage and suppression abilities, although they lack in mobility and melee combat capabilities.

Thaddeus: Thaddeus leads a squad of 3 Assault Marines who specialize in close quarter combat and use jump packs for rapid air assaults, which can stun and break up enemy formations. His squad almost exclusively uses melee weapons, and refocusing to ranged combat is costly and ineffective. A former ganger on Meridian, Thaddeus was the first recruit from that planet in decades, and, although over 80 years old, is considered young and inexperienced compared to his fellow Sergeants, all veterans of several centuries. The process of Space Marine maturation, from a brash fighter into a cold-blooded warrior, is discussed after one of the missions.

Cyrus : Cyrus leads a squad of 3 Scout Marines who specialize in stealth and infiltration. While Scouts are equipped with the ubiquitous bolters by default, and Cyrus can be trained to use flamers, their most effective weapons are unique to the squad - combat shotguns and sniper rifles. Cyrus also gains a special ability depending on the weapon he wields, for example the "Headshot" skill for sniper rifles. The active camouflage ability allows the squad to scout ahead undetected and, when upgraded, to deploy traps and explosives without compromising themselves. They are vital in missions where a direct confrontation is ill-advised.

Davian Thule: A cameo from Dark Crusade, after being critically injured by a Tyranid Warrior, Davian Thule is placed in stasis until his condition can be stabilized. Afterwards, unable to fully recover due to his grievous injuries, he instead becomes a Dreadnought — a cybernetic combat walking vehicle. Although a powerful heavy hitter, Thule is slow and more vulnerable to anti-vehicle weapons and explosives. His default armament — a pair of arms ending in massive power fists, with a flamer fixed under one of them — is geared for melee. However, by replacing one of the arms with an assault cannon, Thule can be turned into a devastating ranged unit.

=== Skirmish ===
Dawn of War II includes a skirmish game as well, playable either as single-player or multiplayer, and uses the Games for Windows - Live online gaming service for multiplayer games and matchmaking.

Prior to a match, a player chooses a faction and one of the chosen faction's three commanders. The various commanders are used to complement different strategies. For example, a player who chooses the Space Marine army can choose among the offense-oriented Force Commander, the support-oriented Apothecary, and the defense-oriented Techmarine.

Unlike most contemporary real-time strategy games, including Dawn of War, most of the unit and research production in Dawn of War II is done from an army's headquarters building, and unit upgrades are performed on the field of battle itself. The focus in the game is on frontline combat and unit-based tactics rather than the more traditional base-building style popularized in titles like Command & Conquer and the Age of Empires series.

There are two game modes in the skirmish game. There is the standard Victory Point Control mode where the key to winning is controlling the critical victory points on the map until the opponent's victory points run down to zero, and in unranked custom matches there is also the annihilation mode where players attempt to completely destroy their opponents' units and structures. In both modes, players fight to control requisition and power nodes which supply factions with required resources. In online ranked play, players compete in 1v1, 2v2 and 3v3 matches. Annihilation games are not supported for ranked play.

=== "The Last Stand" ===
On October 14, 2009, Relic released a new cooperative survival mode for Dawn of War II, called "The Last Stand". Each player takes control of either a Space Marine Captain, an Eldar Farseer or an Ork Mekboy, and co-operates with two other online players in order to take on 20 waves of AI-controlled enemy NPCs inside an arena named "The Bloodied Colosseum", with the final wave being a daemonic horde led by a Chaos Lord and three doppelgängers of the players' characters from Wave 16. With the release of Chaos Rising, the Tyranid Hive Tyrant and Chaos Sorcerer were also made playable. This was further improved with the release of Retribution on March 1, 2011, which added an Imperial Lord General to the selection, as well as a second Chaos-themed arena map called "The Anvil of Khorne", where there are no doppelgängers in Wave 16 and the final wave is the elite Blood Ravens Third Company led by Captain Gabriel Angelos, the original protagonist from Dawn of War. A new purchasable DLC emerged on October 20, 2011, giving players a chance to use the T'au Shas'O Commander. Later on in March 2016, a brand new DLC was announced and released as part of a 5th birthday of Retribution, in which the Necron Overlord became playable.

As the players play through the enemy waves, they can unlock different wargears that grant power-ups and new special attacks for their characters when equipped, by gaining enough experience points, fulfilling certain gameplay criteria, or purchasing DLCs via Steam. The game also provides a collection of palette swaps that the players can choose to customize their characters' gameplay presentation to an extent, similar to the figure painting in the original tabletop fandom.

== Plot ==
Following heavy losses suffered in the Kaurava campaign, the Blood Ravens Space Marine chapter have returned to their home system, Sub-Sector Aurelia, to rebuild. However, the system has recently become plagued by heavy Ork attacks, threatening to wipe out the Chapter permanently. The game opens with the player and Sergeant Tarkus deep-striking onto the desert planet Calderis to aid Captain Davian Thule and his initiates. As they drive away the Orks they are confronted by Mek Badzappa and his wartrukk. Although the Mek escapes, the Space Marines collapse the mine through which they are coming and achieve victory. After this they strike from the cruiser Armageddon into a hamlet where Scout Sergeant Cyrus is waiting for them. They manage to fight their way to Sergeant Avitus, rescue him and save the hamlet from Orks.

After this they receive word that Orks have attacked two more key locations. Cyrus, noting the Orks are displaying unusual strategic skill when picking their targets, hypothesizes they are being directed by an unknown third part, a sentiment Thule agrees with. The first attack is led by a Stormboyz Nob named Skykilla and the second by Warboss Gutrencha. After dealing with the two Orks, the Marines find that both have visited Felhammer Mine recently, and learn that Mek Badzappa is there as well. When they enter the mine, the Space Marines briefly catch sight of a force of Eldar, before the Eldar vanish. The Space Marines are rescued from Ork gunners by Sergeant Thaddeus, who joins their force. They find Badzappa and his platoon under attack by an Eldar Warlock and a company of Guardians; Badzappa, with his mechanical eye, could see that the Eldar were disguising themselves as Orks and directing the Ork attacks on key Imperial targets. Although the Blood Ravens kill the Warlock, the Mek escapes once again. As the Warlock dies he speaks of a greater foe threatening them all that the Orks might have been used to delay, but the heroes remain unconcerned.

They travel to the jungle planet of Typhon Primaris to stop Eldar activity, as a Warp Spider Exarch is stirring up the Orks into revolt and must be eliminated. Afterwards, Thule asks the player to return to Calderis as Mek Badzappa is launching an attack against the capital, and citizens are reporting plants mutating and small purple creatures killing livestock. Cyrus becomes concerned at the Chapter's Astropaths describing a "Shadow in the Warp", but the rest of the Chapter is more preoccupied with the imminent Ork attack. The Space Marines arrive and finally kill the Mek, but they are soon attacked by a force of Tyranids, the greater threat the Eldar warned of. Thule is mortally wounded by a Tyranid Warrior and Techmarine Martellus leads them back to safety after they destroy the Tyranid attack force.

The Space Marines return to Typhon, leaving Apothecary Gordian in charge of Thule. They kill the Eldar ranger Nemerian and return to Calderis to kill the Tyranid Warrior that mortally wounded Captain Thule.

After this they are voxed by Captain Gabriel Angelos (the protagonist of the first game) who tells them that he is bringing his company to aid them in their battle to stop the Tyranids, and gives them three primary objectives: gather a pure sample of Tyranid bio-toxin so that poison can be created (and an antidote to possibly save Captain Thule's life); secure a long-lost Astronomic Array on Typhon, which can find a weakness in the Tyranid Hive Fleet; and gain control of the Angel Forge on the hive world of Meridian, the sector capital, to mass-produce the poisoned weaponry to arm Thule's ships. These can be completed in any order desired. Securing the Astronomic Array will grant the player orbital bombardment and deep-strike, defending Angel Forge will allow Sergeant Tarkus to use Terminator Armour, and gathering the bio-toxin will allow the grievously injured Captain Thule to fight on as a Dreadnought. Meridian is the target of constant Eldar attacks and it is slowly revealed that Idranel, a Farseer of Ulthwé, has been planning to lure the entire Tyranid fleet to Meridian and then destroy it, thus stopping the Tyranid threat and protecting their Craftworld but destroying a planet with population in excess of 32 billion Imperial citizens.

Upon completion of all three objectives, the Tyranid poison is ready for delivery. However, Captain Angelos's ship Litany of Fury and the rest of his fleet are psychically assaulted by the Hive Mind and are in grave danger of becoming lost in the Warp. This effectively takes the reinforcements out of the picture, but the Hive Mind is weakened from the exertion and goes to planet Typhon to feed. The player's entire strike team deploys on the planet and administers the poison to the Hive Mind through its feeder tendrils. In the space battle above, the Armageddon is destroyed and Gordian is killed.

As the poison takes effect, all appears lost as the strike team has no means of retreat and massive waves of Tyranids are preparing to attack. Suddenly, Captain Gabriel Angelos and the entire 4th Company drop in. Angelos leads the player and their forces to attack the Hive Tyrant Alpha, delivering the coup de grâce to the Hive Fleet. As the Tyranids are defeated Gabriel reflects on how the Emperor created the Space Marines to battle the untold horrors of the galaxy, warriors who would fight to the death to defend mankind, and how the strike force are those warriors.

== Development ==
On January 19, 2009, Relic announced that Dawn of War II had gone gold. A beta was started afterwards with an announcement that the beta focused mainly on optimizing multiplayer balance which was to be optimized in a day zero patch.

Dawn of War II was released to the public for beta testing on January 21, 2009, and it was scheduled to run until the game's release date of February 19, 2009. Only purchasers of the Soulstorm expansion pack to Dawn of War were allowed to take part in the first phase of the beta. On January 27, the beta became available to the general public. The beta was downloadable via Valve's Steam online distribution service.

Dawn of War II uses an updated version of the Essence Engine, Essence Engine 2.0. Essence Engine 1.0 was used to power Relic's World War II real-time strategy game Company of Heroes and its two expansion packs Company of Heroes: Opposing Fronts and Company of Heroes: Tales of Valor.

== Release ==
=== Official expansions ===
The first stand-alone expansion entitled Chaos Rising was announced on September 18, 2009, in a gaming magazine podcast. Prior to the announcement on PC Gamer, several moderators for various fan sites were sent Warhammer 40,000 Chaos Terminator Lord Miniatures in boxes bearing Blood Ravens chapter logo and the number MMX. The expansion was released on March 12, 2010.

The second stand-alone expansion, Retribution, was announced on August 17, 2010, and released on March 1, 2011. During this period of time it was shown first to the press at Gamescom. In addition, it was announced on September 15, 2010, that Retribution would not use Games for Windows – Live, and would instead use Valve's Steamworks platform for DRM, achievements, social features and matchmaking. It also features a playable new race: the Imperial Guard.

=== Retail editions ===
- A "Gold Edition" was released; it includes the base game and the Chaos Rising expansion.
- The "Master Collection" includes the base game and both expansions.
- The "Grand Master Collection" includes the contents of the "Master Collection", as well as all additional DLC for Retribution except The Last Stand Necron Overlord and the Ridiculously Bloody Blood Pack.
- The "Anniversary Edition" replaced both the "Master Collection" and the "Grand Master Collection" as a single package on Steam and GOG.com as of September 19, 2024, to commemorate the 15th anniversary of the original game. Owners of the original game were upgraded to the "Anniversary Edition" for free.

== Reception ==
=== Critical reception ===
Reception

Review scores
Publication	Score
1Up.com	A−
Eurogamer	8/10
G4	4/5
GamePro	5/5
GameSpot	8.5/10
GameSpy	4.5/5

Dawn of War II has received a highly positive reception, scoring an average of 85% on Metacritic. Most reviewers have praised it for its fast-paced tactical gameplay and impressive graphics, while criticizing its small number of multiplayer maps, and lack of variety in single-player campaign missions.

GameSpy praised its removal of base building and its "seemingly unlikely hybrid" of real-time strategy and role-playing genres. However it did criticise the single player campaign that having the missions occurring on the same maps "make[s] the missions feel pretty same-y by the end of the campaign." Criticism was also aimed at the use of the Tyranids in the game as "actually fighting them [...] feels a bit underwhelming." but praised the multiplayer and the introduction of logistics, calling it a "stroke of genius." 1UP.com praised the "ingenious addition" of levelled wargear, the tactical choices that squad selection allowed and the replayability that this allowed, but also criticised the continual use of the same maps in single player.

=== Awards ===
During the 13th Annual Interactive Achievement Awards, the Academy of Interactive Arts & Sciences nominated Dawn of War II for "Strategy/Simulation Game of the Year".
