= Warhammer 40,000: Dawn of War – Soulstorm =

- Developers: Iron Lore Entertainment; Relic Entertainment (patches)
- Publisher: THQ (Note: Originally published by THQ. Publishing rights picked up by Sega in 2013 upon THQ's bankruptcy. Currently self-published by Relic Entertainment after split from Sega.)
- Designer: Ian Frazier
- Programmer: Keith Patella
- Artist: Brian Parnell
- Composer: Inon Zur
- Series: Warhammer 40,000
- Platform: Microsoft Windows
- Release: NA: March 4, 2008; AU: March 6, 2008; EU: March 7, 2008
- Genre: Real-time strategy
- Modes: Single-player, multiplayer

Warhammer 40,000: Dawn of War – Soulstorm is the third expansion to the real-time strategy video game Warhammer 40,000: Dawn of War, developed by Iron Lore Entertainment. Like its predecessors, Soulstorm is based on Games Workshop's tabletop wargame Warhammer 40,000, and introduces a multitude of new features to the Dawn of War series, including two new playable factions in the form of the Imperial Sisters of Battle and the Dark Eldar. It is a stand-alone game and does not need the original Dawn of War disc to run, but players must have the prior games installed and provide valid CD keys for these in order to play as anything but the two new factions in Multiplayer.

== Gameplay ==
Strategy gameplay is similar to previous Dawn of war titles, except for the addition of an aerial unit for each faction, that is effective at defeating vehicles or structures, and new campaign gameplay features. As with its predecessor Dark Crusade, Soulstorm features a Risk-style "meta-campaign" featuring 31 territories or provinces spread over four planets and three moons. One difference, however, is that unlike Dark Crusade, there are no persistent bases. Once the player conquers a territory, the base structures the player has built up will not be present in future conflicts, aside from buildings purchased as reinforcements, or as a forward base when attacking during the meta-campaign phase, which is a passive ability unique to the Sisters of battle faction. Each faction starts with a unique passive ability and another faction can obtain it for itself by conquering that faction´s stronghold province and eliminating them as an active participant in the campaign. Another difference is that the strength of an attacking enemy army is no longer based on strength of province they're attacking from, but their army size.

=== Multiplayer ===
Multiplayer remains the same as in previous titles, with players given the ability to either play via LAN or on the GameSpy network. A new 'medal' system has been added that provides rewards for certain player milestones (5-to-1 kill ratio, etc.), but there is no means of viewing the complete collection of medals a player has earned. It is assumed this problem will be addressed when an official patch is released along with other various bug fixes and corrections to the game, such as the current issue restricting certain masses of players from joining online multiplayer games.

== Plot ==
The Kaurava conflict began after a sudden appearance of a Warp Storm near Kaurava IV. Previously, the system was held entirely by the Imperium of Mankind and defended by the Imperial Guard, except for two areas—the Ork infested jungles of Kaurava II and the underground of Kaurava III, holding Necron tombs in hibernation. The warp storm leads to the awakening of the Necrons, and the arrival of Ork warboss Gorgutz, who absorbs the indigenous, technologically primitive Orks into his own forces. Six other factions appear in the system. The Eldar under the leadership of Farseer Caerys arrive in response to the Necron awakening, to face their ancient enemy. The Imperial Guard comes under suspicion by the Imperium's Blood Ravens chapter of the Space Marines, and the Sisters of Battle, for suspected heresy. This forces a conflict between the three imperial factions. A Chaos warband of the Alpha Legion arrives using the warpstorm. The Tau arrive, intending to annex the system into the Tau Empire. Finally, the Dark Eldar, usually avoiding large-scale warfare, see the chaos and confusion of the conflict as an opportunity to capture prisoners and souls.

Several endings exist:

- Chaos: The reason for the Warp Storm is revealed in the Chaos ending to have begun with an ignorant Imperial Guardsman with latent psyker genes who responded to the whispered influence of the Chaos Gods, telling him to prepare a ritual. His actions unknowingly summoned the Alpha Legion to the Kaurava System, thus starting the conflict. The Alpha Legion succeeds in turning Kaurava into a staging ground for attacks into the Imperium.
- Imperial Guard: Vance Stubbs clears the Kauravan defenders of suspected heresy. The surviving Blood Ravens and Sisters of Battle are treated well after their defeat. The entire system is recolonized, except for Kaurava III, containing the Necrons. Kaurava becomes a system of incredible value to the Imperium.
- Blood Ravens: The Blood Ravens treat the Imperial Guard and Sisters of Battle survivors with mercy. They establish Kaurava as a fortress-system, allowing them to use it as a base and recruiting ground.
- Eldar: The Eldar defeat all their enemies and mostly withdraw after concealing evidence of the conflict. The few Imperial Guard survivors manage to rebuild with reinforcements, but hit-and-run attacks by Eldar patrols prevent Kaurava III from being colonized, as to not provoke further Necron awakenings.
- Tau: The Tau establish Kaurava as a system of great importance in the Tau Empire.
- Sisters of Battle: The opposing Imperial forces are executed by the Sisters. They clear the rest of the system and establish Kaurava as a place of pilgrimage within the Imperium.
- Dark Eldar: The Dark Eldar capture incredible numbers of prisoners before departing from the system.
- Orks: Kaurava is conquered and serves as a staging point for a future WAAAAGH!, or an aggressive campaign, under the command of Gorgutz.
- Necrons: Necron forces exploit the confusion between the forces of the living and are able to awaken more of their fellows and later launch further invasions against other factions.

The canonical fate of the Kaurava System depends on the actions taken by the various factions fighting over it, but initially, the only known details on the canonical ending initially came only from dialogue in the sequel, Warhammer 40,000: Dawn of War II. Scout Sergeant Cyrus states that the Kaurava campaign was a failure, and that the majority of the Blood Ravens led by Captain Indrick Boreale were wiped out, costing the chapter half of its manpower in a single campaign. As a result, the severely undermanned Blood Ravens cannot afford to lose their recruiting worlds in sub-sector Aurelia and must defend them at all costs. Dialogue in Warhammer 40,000: Dawn of War III reveals that the Orks led by Gorgutz were indeed the ones who defeated the Blood Ravens under Indrick Boreale and there has been no reliable source to state who won the Kaurava System.

== Development ==
Warhammer 40,000: Dawn of War – Soulstorm was developed by Iron Lore Entertainment as the third expansion to the Warhammer 40,000: Dawn of War. On January 13, 2008, Relic released a 1.12 GB demo of Soulstorm on several gaming websites. The demo allows players to play a tutorial, as well as one skirmish and one scenario map as the Dark Eldar. The demo's loading screens also show the new flying units added in the expansion. The demo scenario depicts an assault by the Dark Eldar, as the playlable faction, on the Space Marine stronghold, similarly to how this battle happens in the campaign. On March 4, 2008, Soulstorm was released first on the North American market, some days later everywhere else. After the end of patch support, the game's community continued the support with own made unofficial patches.

== Reception ==
Dawn of War: Soulstorm

Aggregate scores
Aggregator	Score
GameRankings	74.26/100%
Metacritic	73/100

Review scores
Publication	Score
Eurogamer	6/10
GameRevolution	6/10
GameSpot	6.5/10
GameSpy	3/5
GamesRadar+	4/5
GameZone	7.8/10
IGN	7/10
VideoGamer.com	8/10

Soulstorm received "mixed or average" reviews, according to review aggregator Metacritic.

Eurogamer gave the game a 6 out of 10, writing, "Dawn of War is still a thrilling, explosive real-time strategy, even if it is now starting to look quite raggedy...[Soulstorm] offers too little, and is without the massively appealing races of previous expansions. GameRevolution rated it similarly and praised its amount of maps, single-player content, multiplayer, and solid performance while also acknowledging the aging graphics and uninteresting new factions. GameSpot and IGN commended the addition of the new factions, setting, aerial units, and atmosphere while taking issue with the lack of innovation and identical feel to the previous year's Dark Crusade campaign. GamesRadar appreciated the changes made to balancing and the solid multiplayer but thought that the campaign was weak and supported by an aging engine.
