= The Outfit (video game) =

2006 video game

- Developer: Relic Entertainment
- Publisher: THQ
- Composers: Rob Cairns; Tony Morales
- Platform: Xbox 360
- Release: NA: March 13, 2006; EU: March 17, 2006; JP: November 2, 2006
- Genre: Third-person shooter
- Modes: Single-player, multiplayer

The Outfit is a 2006 third-person shooter video game developed by Relic Entertainment and published by THQ for Xbox 360. Set within war ravaged Europe during World War II, the game combines squad-based combat and strategic gameplay elements with cinematic interludes.

The Outfit gives players the option to control three different squad leaders (voiced by Robert Patrick, Ron Perlman, and Terrence C. Carson), each with their own specific skills and abilities. Via the squad leaders, players are able to control a squad of battle-forged soldiers on missions based in highly destructible battlefields. By engaging in combat with the enemy, players earn "Field Units" (FUs) that can be used to order in "Destruction on Demand" to upgrade their arsenal, order in tanks and many other vehicles, build machine gun nests and anti-tank emplacements, or call for air or artillery strikes.

The game includes 12 single-player missions and cooperative missions, and it supports online play with Microsoft's Xbox Live service. The Outfit is designed to play in high-definition (16:9 ratio) with Dolby Digital surround sound.

== Plot ==
The plot starts off on a beach where the team goes over their overall objectives and then go to save a small town, only to find all of the citizens have been either killed or evacuated except a French priest, Father François. He points out that he is "still a man of God", and therefore would only provide help with his knowledge of the enemy. He also tells them that most of the population was massacred in the village church by General Hans von Beck, who answers only to Hitler.

After defending a small village from a German counterattack, François is found missing and is discovered to be a German collaborator, while the Americans find a new ally in Adrienne, a female member of the French resistance. Meanwhile, two high-ranking officers within the German army quarrel over their duties, one being an SS commander and the other a Wehrmacht general.

During a mission, the team raid a U-boat base to find where von Beck is. Upon successfully stealing an Enigma machine, they find von Beck was not responsible for the massacre, which was instead the act of an SS commander, Victor Morder, and that von Beck had been part of the failed 20 July plot to assassinate Hitler. In a mission to a factory, Deuce is fatally wounded by François, but manages to take out all of the German forces in the area, as well as himself, by throwing a lit cigar into an explosives cache. The remaining Americans eventually corner François in a church in a town ironically similar to the village they first met the priest. Mac decides to spare his life, leaving him at the mercy of Morder. As he is leaving the church, however, François takes aim with an M1911, only to be shot and killed by Mac, using Deuce's favorite revolver.

The Americans form an alliance with von Beck during one of their later missions. With his help, the allied forces eventually arrive at the SS tower stronghold where Morder is making his last stand. They capture one of the SS rail cannons and take down the tower with Morder inside.

The ending shows von Beck surrendering to the American forces and formally saluting. Deuce's grave is shown with his favorite pistol at his headstone. Mac is seen after the credits, reunited with Adrienne.

== Reception ==
Reception

Aggregate score
Aggregator	Score
Metacritic	70/100

Review scores
Publication	Score
Edge	7/10
Electronic Gaming Monthly	6.67/10
Eurogamer	5/10
Famitsu	28/40
Game Informer	7.75/10
GamePro	4.5/5
GameRevolution	C+
GameSpot	6.7/10
GameSpy	3.5/5
GameTrailers	7.8/10
GameZone	7.1/10
IGN	6.9/10
Official Xbox Magazine (US)	8.5/10
FHM	3/5
The Sydney Morning Herald	3/5

The game received "average" reviews according to video game review aggregator Metacritic. In Japan, Famitsu gave it a score of one eight, two sevens, and one six, for a total of 28 out of 40.

Maxim gave it a score of four stars out of five and said: "If modern war games aren't your style, try on this Nazi neutralizer. Realism is an afterthought in this outrageous squad-based shooter that encourages demolition over diplomacy". However, FHM gave it three stars out of five and called it "a WW2 shooter that lobs in some real-time strategy elements alongside the usual grenades. You and your squad of Marines go Nazi-hunting, and the more enemies you kill and bases you snatch, the more points you get". The Sydney Morning Herald similarly gave it three stars out of five, stating that "variety is lacking, ensuring replay appeal is limited to the fun multiplayer modes only".
