= Warhammer 40,000: Dawn of War – Winter Assault =

2005 video game

- Developer: Relic Entertainment
- Publisher: THQ (Note: Originally published by THQ. Publishing rights picked up by Sega in 2013 upon THQ's bankruptcy. Currently self-published by Relic Entertainment after split from Sega.)
- Producer: Jonathan Dowdeswell
- Designer: Andrew Chambers
- Programmer: Dominic Mathieu
- Artists: Andy Lang; Roland Longpre
- Composer: Inon Zur
- Series: Warhammer 40,000
- Platform: Windows
- Release: NA: September 19, 2005; EU: September 23, 2005; AU: September 30, 2005
- Genre: Real-time strategy
- Modes: Single-player, multiplayer

Warhammer 40,000: Dawn of War – Winter Assault is the first expansion to Warhammer 40,000: Dawn of War for Windows by developer Relic Entertainment and publisher THQ. Based on Games Workshop's tabletop wargame, Warhammer 40,000, Dawn of War: Winter Assault was released in September 2005. Some time after its initial release, Winter Assault and Dawn of War were coupled together in a double pack which featured some art on a fold out cover, an Ork with a flamethrower, or a group of Imperial Guard tanks lined up for attack. Though Winter Assault required the base game to play, its follow-up expansions, Dark Crusade and Soulstorm were stand-alone, not requiring the base game.

== Expansion features ==
New units are added to each of the base game's races.

=== Imperial Guard ===
A new faction was included, the Imperial Guard, with some units previously available in certain single player missions of Dawn of War.

The Imperial Guard specializes in defense and attrition warfare, and therefore has the strongest defensive structures of all the factions in the game, as well as garrisonable production structures and a tunnel network between them, allowing stealthy transfer of troops. Their infantry tends to be of lower quality than that of their opponents in terms of weapons, armor, and morale, due to Guardsmen being regular humans. However, the Imperial Guard makes up for this with a range of powerful armoured vehicles, such as the Leman Russ and the Baneblade, as well as the Sentinel walkers, which until the Dark Crusade expansion were the only vehicular unit in the game which could uncapture strategic points. Also, uniquely, the Imperial Guard features not a single primary hero but a Command Squad staffed by a General and up to four secondary heroes, as well as up to 13 stand-alone secondary heroes, 8 out of which are Commissars or Priests that are much more effective when attached to squads (e.g. a Commissar helps to combat morale problems).

=== New campaign ===
There are two new single player campaigns, both of which involve each faction attempting to recover a lost Imperator-Class Imperial Titan. All races from Dawn of War (Orks, Eldar, Chaos, and Space Marines) are available in addition to the new Imperial Guard, with each race trying to find and gain control of the Titan for their own reasons. Although the Titan as a whole is not controllable, its weapon systems can be used to assist in the destruction of the Necrons, who make a cameo in the final mission for each faction. In this campaign at the beginning the player has a choice to either go with "Disorder", personified by the Orks and Chaos Space Marines, or with "Order", which comprises the Eldar and Imperial Guard with the odd appearance by the Space Marines.

=== Other changes ===
Many of the units available in Dawn of War were simplified, reduced or limited for the Winter Assault expansion. For example, Space Marine Predator tanks were limited to carrying anti-tank weapons while Chaos Predators were limited to anti-personnel weapons. In the original Dawn of War game both sides could upgrade their tanks from anti-personnel to anti-tank (Destructor pattern and Annihilator pattern respectively). Likewise the Land Raider was limited to one per player but in turn had greatly increased durability.

Limitations were also applied to the Orks, who lost most of their upgrade choices and became limited in their weapon choices. The Eldar had their "hard counters" removed, meaning that specialized units such as Dark Reapers were no longer as prominently effective against heavy infantry. Some units, including most of the Ork army, also lost the ability to use grenades. The Chaos Space Marines also lost the ability to upgrade to any heavy weapons other than the heavy bolter and plasma gun.

== Plot ==
=== Setting ===
The game takes place in the late 41st millennium, on Lorn V, a winter planet on the fringes of known space. The planet was once controlled by the Imperium of Man, but has fallen into the control of demonic Chaos forces loyal to the Chaos God Khorne. Chaos control over Lorn V is contested by Orkish warbands, who are currently divided amongst themselves. The 412th Cadian Regiment, from the fortress world Cadia, is dispatched to reclaim the world and the Titan upon it. The Eldar travel to the planet to fight their ancient enemy awakening from dormancy, the Necrons. The four faction leaders are Farseer Taldeer of the Eldar, General Sturnn of the Imperial Guard, Khornate Chaos Lord Crull of the Chaos Space Marines and Gorgutz of the Orks. Supporting characters include an imperial Commissar and the Ultramarine Space Marine Chaplain Varnus. The Imperial Guard under the command of Sturnn assault the planet to recover a Titan Dominatus, an ancient war-machine of the Imperium. Except for a reference made, there is no connection to the base game's campaign.

=== Order ===
The Order campaign begins with the landing of Guard forces on the planet. The Eldar secretly assist the Imperium forces. Space Marines under the command of Varnus are rescued to assist the Imperium forces. The Eldar and Imperium form an alliance of convenience. Taldeer reveals that she is on the planet to combat the Necrons, an ancient enemy of the Eldar. The player is given a branching choice whether to finish the campaign as the Eldar or Imperial Guard. Whatever faction is chosen leaves the other behind an energy field. If the Eldar are chosen, the Imperial Guard manage to fight their way to the Titan and assist against the Necrons. The Eldar choice ends with the Titan suffering critical damage, leading to its imminent explosion. The Eldar teleport out. If the Imperial Guard are chosen, then they successfully defeat the Necrons and recover the Titan.

=== Disorder ===
Gorgutz reunites the Orkish clans on Lorn V into one. The entry of the Imperial Guard onto the planet forces an alliance between the Orks and Chaos forces. A choice to finish the campaign is given like the Order campaign. If Chaos is chosen, Crull defeats the Necrons, corrupts the Titan and uses it for his own ambitions. If the Orks are chosen, the Necrons are defeated while the Titan is left abandoned. Gorgutz kills Crull in a duel.

The canonical ending is unknown, however either the Eldar or Imperial Guard were the canonical choices. Taldeer and Gorgutz appear as the Eldar and Ork faction commanders respectively in Dark Crusade.

== Development ==
Winter Assault was announced in early 2005. Several non-gameplay improvements were implemented in Winter Assault. A weather system was introduced to improve immersion. The author C.S. Goto adapted Winter Assault as the novel Dawn of War: Tempest.

== Reception ==
Dawn of War: Winter Assault

Aggregate scores
Aggregator	Score
GameRankings	85.67/100%
Metacritic	85/100

Review scores
Publication	Score
Computer Gaming World	9/10
Eurogamer	8/10
GamePro	8/10
GameSpot	8.3/10
GameSpy	4.5/5
IGN	8.5/10

Winter Assault received "generally positive" reviews, according to review aggregation sites Metacritic and GameRankings.
