= Warhammer 40,000: Dawn of War =

2004 video game

- Developer: Relic Entertainment
- Publishers: THQ (Note: Originally published by THQ. Publishing rights picked up by Sega in 2013 upon THQ's bankruptcy. Currently self-published by Relic Entertainment after split from Sega.); Relic Entertainment (Definitive Edition)
- Director: Alex Garden
- Producer: Jonathan Dowdeswell
- Designer: Jay Wilson
- Programmer: Dominic Mathieu
- Artist: Andy Lang
- Composer: Jeremy Soule (Note: Additional music by Inon Zur)
- Series: Warhammer 40,000
- Engine: Essence Engine
- Platform: Windows
- Release: Original release: NA: September 20, 2004; PAL: September 24, 2004; Definitive Edition: WW: August 14, 2025
- Genre: Real-time strategy
- Modes: Single-player, multiplayer

Warhammer 40,000: Dawn of War is a military science fiction real-time strategy video game developed by Relic Entertainment and based on Games Workshop's miniature wargame Warhammer 40,000. It was released by THQ on September 20, 2004, in North America and on September 24 in Europe.

As a series, Warhammer 40,000: Dawn of War has sold more than 7 million copies worldwide as of January 2013.

Three expansion packs have been released: Winter Assault in 2005, Dark Crusade in 2006, and Soulstorm in 2008. A remastered version of the game and its three expansions, titled Warhammer 40,000: Dawn of War - Definitive Edition, was released on August 14, 2025. The game has three sequels: Dawn of War II (2009), Dawn of War III (2017), and Dawn of War IV (2026).

== Gameplay ==
A squad of Space Marines engage a group of Orks next to a Strategic Point.

Gameplay is initially focused on capturing and holding strategic locations on the battlefield. These control points are captured by infantry squads and provide resources to construct additional units and buildings or unlock certain units in an army's tech tree. Battles are won either by holding a certain number of control points for a period of time or by destroying all of the opposing armies' HQ structures. A number of special conditions are available to choose from to customize matches.

== Synopsis ==
=== Setting ===
The game is set in the Warhammer 40,000 universe: a dystopian vision of the far future in which humanity has forged a galaxy-spanning empire, The Imperium of Man. The Imperium, desperately fighting to preserve the human race from extinction, is in a state of constant war with alien species like the Orks or Eldar, as well as insurrections from renegade worlds or the human servants of Chaos, who employ demonic forces and sorcery under either of the Chaos Gods they serve, having deliberately betrayed their once godlike Emperor of Man.

The single player campaign is set on the planet Tartarus, an Imperial colony under siege by Ork invaders, with the player taking the role of the Space Marines' Blood Ravens 3rd Company, led by Captain Gabriel Angelos, that arrives to assist the planet's 37th Tartarus Planetary Defence Force Regiment of the Imperial Guard, led by Colonel Carus Brom. The story of this campaign also sets the stage for the events of Dawn of War II - Retribution.

=== Plot ===
The Blood Ravens' Space Marines, upon descent to the planet's surface, secure Tartarus' spaceport and start their own operations against the warring Orkish forces. These include key tasks such as the elimination of their leaders (including an Ork Warboss) to destabilize the Orks' fighting spirit. Unknown to the Space Marines, however, the Orks' invasion was in fact engineered by the Chaos Alpha Legion's Sorcerer, Sindri Myr, as a smokescreen to their operations on Tartarus, using the forces of Sindri's supposed commander, Lord Bale. However, during the confrontation with the Warboss, the shuttle which ferries Sindri and Bale away is spotted by a Blood Ravens' scout.

Hearing this, Angelos is set to investigate, but is interrupted by the sudden arrival of Mordecai Toth of the Inquisition, who attempts to order the Blood Ravens to evacuate Tartarus (due to an upcoming Warp Storm that will soon engulf the planet in Chaos energy and prevent warp travel and escape). Angelos allows Toth use of Space Marine transports to assist in the evacuation but desires to remain and investigate, clashing with Toth's resolution, who cites that Angelos' previous request of an Exterminatus (a space-based planetary bombardment) on his once homeworld of Cyrene, years ago, may have affected his judgement, "seeing Chaos where it doesn't exist".

During Angelos' obstinate pursuit, he uncovers the presence of Eldar forces from the Biel-Tan Craftworld, under Farseer Macha, covertly operating on Tartarus and coming across Chaos 'markers' (sacrificial sites which show the way to a specific location) that Angelos orders his long-friend and Librarian, Isador Akios, to document and then destroy. The Librarian, however, secretly harbours Chaos artifacts and he damages the Blood Ravens' transports to allow further research time, being influenced constantly by Sindri's temptations.

Angelos' forces track the Eldar to the urban settlement of Loovre Marr, engaging them in full-scale battle, as Sindri and the Alpha Legion infiltrate the city and abscond with an artifact, which Macha believes is the "key to the undoing of this world". Witnessing the events too late, Angelos presses Macha for more information, but instead, the Eldar leader implicates Toth's involvement in the matter, citing his obstinance in withholding information and using the matter of the upcoming Warp Storm to avoid involving any other interested party in the conflict. Angelos clashes again with Toth, who assumes command of all of the planet's Imperial assets, except the Blood Ravens and 37th Tartarus Planetary Defence Force, after learning Angelos employed Colonel Brom's Imperial Guard to assist him. Toth claims that Angelos' stubbornness to leave the planet may be a sign of Chaos corruption.

On a hint given by Macha, whose forces are severely weakened due to the battle of Loovre Marr, the Blood Ravens track down the Alpha Legion to the ruins of an Imperial Temple where they are stalled by traitorous Imperial Guard regiments, corrupted by Chaos, giving time for Sindri and Bale to evade pursuit once again. After the battle, Angelos confronts Toth when he arrives at the scene, with Toth revealing the planet bears an ancient Chaos artifact called the Maledictum, a stone which contains the essence of a daemon, capable of influencing human minds to perform its bidding, while summoning Warp Storms to imprison any that attempt to escape. Toth explains that the Eldar presence on Tartarus was to prevent the Alpha Legion from unearthing the stone, unwilling to inform or cooperate with Imperial forces due to arrogant behaviour, seeing themselves as "the only capable defence against its influence".

Angelos and Toth make amends and advance against the primary position of the Alpha Legion, as it is performing an unholy ritual to unearth the Maledictum. However, while the Blood Ravens and the remaining loyal Imperial Guard exterminate Lord Bale's forces, the same abandoned by Sindri to die to unearth the artifact, Isador takes the Maledictum and departs with Sindri, revealing that he had been overcome by the temptations of Chaos. Angelos and Toth pursue but only reach him after he has been subdued by Sindri who takes the Maledictum. Toth reveals that he suspected corruption from within the Blood Ravens, but made a mistake in focusing more on Angelos than Isador because of Angelos' obstinacy and dark past, citing it took either "steel or rot" to plead the Inquisition to exterminate the whole population of Angelos' former home. As the Blood Ravens destroy Isador's Chaos forces, Angelos fights Isador in a hand-to-hand duel. Despite Isador's taunts of Gabriel's supposed weakness and guilt for the events of Cyrene, Gabriel overcomes them, citing "innocents must die so that humanity may live", implying that the planet was long corrupted by Chaos and there was no salvation but by destruction. Defeating Isador, Angelos executes him even as the Librarian tries pleading for forgiveness.

Angelos and Toth chase Sindri to a ritual site, as the Warp Storm approaches, but fail to apprehend him before he performs a ritual with the Maledictum to sacrifice himself in order to summon a Daemon Prince. As Toth bequeaths his Daemon Hammer, "God-Splitter", to Angelos, the Blood Ravens, assisted by the Eldar survivors, fight and overcome the remaining Alpha Legion in a violent battle, overcoming the Daemon Prince despite its power. In the aftermath, Toth orders Angelos to destroy the Maledictum, while Macha pleads him to stay his hammer. Angelos, however, quickly destroys it. As all parties start to evacuate, Angelos is called back and faces the daemon that he has unknowingly freed from its prison, the Maledictum. The daemon reveals that all of Tartarus was actually a sacrificial altar to the Chaos God Khorne (the Blood God) and that every death in the confrontation, including the Ork invasion, which was arranged by Sindri, were offerings to empower the stone to allow the Daemon's release. It is implied that had the Blood Ravens realized this and destroyed the Maledictum earlier, the daemon would likely have been destroyed as well.

The daemon allows Angelos and the Blood Ravens to leave, though with a message that he soon would be coming for them all. Gabriel vows to destroy the daemon, stating "I know you now", before finally departing Tartarus.

== Development ==
The game was in development for more than a year by about 30 people.

== Release ==
=== Official expansions ===
The base game has three expansions, all available in retail DVD format and via digital distribution. Each expansion adds substantial additional new content to the game, such as new factions, maps and units. For the latter standalone expansions, users are unable to play any factions in multiplayer other than those added by the expansion itself.

In chronological order of release, these expansions are: Winter Assault, Dark Crusade and Soulstorm. Out of these, Winter Assault requires the base game whereas the other two are stand-alone.

Cumulatively, the expansions add five new factions to the game's pre-existing selection of four, making for a total of nine factions to choose from, along with adding dozens of new maps, tweaks, etc.

=== Retail editions ===
- The "Game of the Year Edition" was released on September 21, 2005 in the US and on September 23 in Europe, containing 4 exclusive maps and other updates.
- Later, the "Game of the Year Edition" and Winter Assault were bundled in the "Gold Edition" in the US, released in March 2006.
- In November 2006, Dawn of War and its first two expansions were released together as "The Platinum Collection" in the US and as the "Dawn of War Anthology" in PAL regions.
- In March 2008, all three expansions along with Dawn of War were released as "The Complete Collection".
- The "Master Collection" on Steam and GOG.com, similar to "The Complete Collection", includes the "Game of the Year Edition" of the game as well as the three expansions.
- The "Anniversary Edition" replaced the "Master Collection" as a single package on Steam and GOG.com as of September 19, 2024 to commemorate the 20th anniversary of the original game. Owners of the original game were upgraded to the "Anniversary Edition" for free.

== Definitive Edition ==
A definitive edition of the game was released on August 15, 2025. It consists of a bundle of the base game and its expansion packs, alongside graphical and gameplay improvements.

== Related media ==
In addition, a series of three novels was released by Black Library and later released as a single omnibus volume.

== Reception ==
=== Critical reception ===
Reception

Aggregate scores
Aggregator	Score
GameRankings	87%
Metacritic	86/100

Review scores
Publication	Score
Computer Gaming World	4.5 out of 5
Game Informer	9.25/10
GamePro	5/5
GameSpot	8.8/10
GameSpy	4.5/5
IGN	8.8/10
PC Gamer (UK)	91%

By early 2009, Dawn of War and its expansion packs together had sold 4 million copies. Dawn of War received a "Silver" sales award from the Entertainment and Leisure Software Publishers Association (ELSPA), indicating sales of at least 100,000 copies in the United Kingdom.

Upon release, the critical response to Warhammer 40,000: Dawn of War was on the whole positive. It was congratulated most frequently for its varied and balanced factions and units, its polished presentation, in particular the high quality of unit animations, and the user interface.

One of the first reviews was by IGN, who awarded the game 8.8/10, in particular praising the large level of graphical and animation detail. They also cited the skirmish and multiplayer as one of the game's strongest points. GameSpot came to similar conclusions, in particular praising the game's presentation and audio.

Conversely, an area of the game that drew criticism was the single player campaign, which many reviewers found to be too short and unchallenging. Another area of weakness identified was a lack of originality in the gameplay. However, these weaknesses were considered to be minor, IGN summarised: "Nothing about the gameplay will really surprise anyone (though the addition of reinforceable squads is pretty neat) but it doesn't particularly matter ... Relic kicked ass creating a great piece of entertainment." The French website Jeux PC awarded the game 16 out of 20, in particular praising the simplicity of the user interface and the intensity of the battles. German reviewer Daniel Matschijewsky awarded the game 83 out of 100, praising the user interface and the sound, but identifying the campaign and the AI as weaker areas.

=== Awards ===
Dawn of War was a runner-up for Computer Games Magazine's list of the ten best computer games of 2004. It received a runner-up position in GameSpot's 2004 "Best Strategy Game" award category across all platforms, losing to Rome: Total War. During the 8th Annual Interactive Achievement Awards, Dawn of War received nominations for "Strategy Game of the Year" and "Outstanding Achievement in Online Gameplay".
