= Warhammer 40,000: Space Marine =

2011 video game

- Developer: Relic Entertainment (Note: Remastered version developed by SneakyBox)
- Publisher: THQ (Note: Original version first published by THQ. Publishing rights to the original release picked up by Sega in 2013 upon THQ's bankruptcy. Currently self-published by Relic Entertainment after split from Sega. Remastered version published by Sega.)
- Director: Raphael Van Lierop
- Composers: Cris Velasco; Sascha Dikiciyan
- Series: Warhammer 40,000
- Platforms: Windows, PlayStation 3, Xbox 360, Xbox Series X/S
- Release: Original release: NA: September 6, 2011; AU: September 8, 2011; EU: September 9, 2011; Master Crafted Edition: WW: June 10, 2025
- Genres: Third-person shooter, hack and slash
- Modes: Single-player, multiplayer

Warhammer 40,000: Space Marine is a 2011 third-person shooter hack and slash video game developed by Relic Entertainment and published by THQ. The game was released for PlayStation 3, Windows, and Xbox 360 in North America, Australia, and Europe in September 2011.

Warhammer 40,000: Space Marine takes place in Games Workshop's Warhammer 40,000 universe and features the Ultramarines chapter. Its gameplay focuses on a hybrid shooting and melee combat model. The game received generally mixed-to-positive reviews from critics.

A sequel, Warhammer 40,000: Space Marine 2, was released in 2024. A remastered version developed by SneakyBox, titled Warhammer 40,000: Space Marine - Master Crafted Edition, was released for Windows and Xbox Series X/S on June 10, 2025.

== Gameplay ==
Space Marine emphasizes melee combat from a third-person perspective.

In Space Marine, the player engages enemies in both melee and at range from a third-person point of view. The player character, Demetrian Titus, has a regenerative force shield (i.e. the "Iron Halo") that can absorb initial damages but require certain cooldown before recovery. When his health gets low, performing stun moves can allow Titus to trigger a quick time event known as "Execution" which results in an instant kill and regaining a portion of his health. Titus is accompanied by the characters Sidonus and Leandros for most of the game, though some missions are performed alone. The game features a "Fury" meter that, when filled up, grants rapid health regeneration and stronger melee attacks. This ability can later be upgraded with purity seals to improve its duration, the rate at which it recharges, and the effectiveness of ranged attacks (slow motion when zoomed, a faster fire rate and increased damage).

The starting weapons include a combat knife and a 8-shot bolt pistol (which is semi-automatic but has infinite ammunition), though the player can acquire other more powerful weapons, hand grenades, ammunitions and medkits along the game. Upgradable ranged weapons include boltgun and heavy bolter, stalker bolter (which functions as a sniper rifle), melta gun (which functions as a combat shotgun), plasma gun, and also a new weapon not featured in the tabletop game known as the Vengeance Launcher, which is a grenade launcher that shoot remotely detonated sticky fusion grenades; upgradable melee weapons include chainsword, power sword (acquired via DLC), power axe and thunderhammer. In certain stages of the game, Titus can also acquire a jet pack which provides short bursts of aerial movements and deals damages within a small area upon impactful landing.

The game's main antagonists are the Orks and later the Forces of Chaos. The Orks are an alien race of brutish looters. The Forces of Chaos are traitor Space Marines who follow the Gods of Chaos, and can summon daemons that live in a parallel dimension known as The Warp. Portals conjured by the Traitor Legions allow daemons to enter the battlefield.

In additional to the single-player campaign, the game also features an 8-vs-8 online multiplayer mode, and a 4-player cooperative survival mode called "Exterminatus", both of which have a class-based gameplay that dictates the type of weapons a player can choose to equip with each loadout.

== Synopsis ==
=== Setting and characters ===
The events of the story take place on Forge World Graia, a planet devoted to producing weaponry for the Imperium of Man, which has been invaded by an Ork WAAAGH! led by Warboss Grimskull.

The game follows a Command Squad of three Ultramarines, a group of genetically-engineered, cybernetically and biologically enhanced super soldiers referred to in-universe as "Space Marines" or "Adeptus Astartes". The main characters are 2nd Company Commander and playable character Captain Demetrian Titus (voiced by Mark Strong), his immediate subordinate Veteran Sergeant Sidonus, and a relatively inexperienced and by-the-book Tactical Marine named Leandros. Other notable characters include Imperial Guard commander Second Lieutenant Miranda 'Mira' Nero and Ordo Xenos Inquisitor Drogan.

=== Plot ===
After the invasion of Forge World Graia by Orks, Imperial military commanders decide to deploy a group of Space Marines of the Ultramarines chapter to reinforce local Imperial forces and reclaim the planet's critical manufacturing capabilities.

Upon arrival, the squad provides assistance to the Guard and its sole surviving junior officer, Second Lieutenant Miranda 'Mira' Nero. After sabotaging captured planetary defense cannons, supply ships are able to reach the beleaguered defenders. While securing the Titan Invictus (a giant, bipedal war machine produced on Graia), Titus answers a distress call from Imperial Inquisitor Drogan (voiced by Danny Webb), from whom they learn of a weapon that can wipe out the Orks, but which needs a power source that is located in a reactor below the Manufactorum. Titus retrieves it and activates the Psychic Scourge, but the Orks are not killed. Instead, a Warp gate to the realm of Chaos is opened, unleashing several daemons that massacre the surrounding Orks. Moments later, the Chaos Lord Nemeroth emerges from the portal. It is then revealed that Drogan was killed at some point prior to meeting Titus and his corpse was possessed and used by Nemeroth as a sleeper agent. Titus gathers enough strength to grab the Power Source, which had been ejected from the Scourge, and Nemeroth is ambushed by Grimskull, the Ork Warboss in charge of their invasion of Graia, allowing the Space Marines to escape.

The Scourge makes a growing Warp portal around the Orbital Spire, allowing Chaos forces to pour in. Seeing this, Titus forms a plan to destroy the portal and the Spire by using the Titan they had secured earlier. The Titan Invictus is supercharged by the Power Source and destroys the Spire. Realizing that the Power Source is too dangerous to be entrusted to anyone, even the Inquisition, Titus decides to bring it back to the Chapter Master of The Ultramarines and the Chief Librarian so they can seal it in the Chapter’s armory. However, Sidonus is killed by Nemeroth and the Power Source is stolen and taken to the remains of the Spire. Leandros is greatly shaken by the fact that Titus appears unharmed by large amounts of Warp energy, which is known to corrupt anything it touches (including Space Marines).

The reinforcement fleet finally arrives, including a company of Blood Ravens Space Marines, the rest of Titus's company and large numbers of Imperial Guard. Titus leads them in an attack through the remaining Chaos forces to stop Nemeroth from performing a ritual to ascend to the status of a Daemon Prince. Titus confronts Nemeroth atop the Spire, and both are knocked off the Spire in the struggle. After crushing Nemeroth's head, Titus breaks the Power Source in half with his hands. Titus survives the exposure to the raw Warp energy again, and is rescued by a Thunderhawk dropship.

Afterward, Titus is approached by Inquisitor Thrax, accompanied by Leandros and escorted by several Black Templar Space Marines, who places Titus under arrest. Leandros believes that his Captain has been corrupted by Chaos based on Titus’ repeated exposure to warp energies. Titus denies accusations of heresy and is backed up in this by Lieutenant Mira, who also protests the accusation, but Titus warns her to back down, knowing the Inquisition may summarily execute the population of the planet. Titus voluntarily goes with Inquisitor Thrax on the condition that the Inquisition leaves the planet and his fellow Ultramarines alone. Before taking off from the planet, Titus chastises Leandros for his single-minded following of the Codex Astartes, and his inability to see past it and think for himself - something Titus believes is the true test of a Space Marine.

A computerised report in Imperial records shows that the threat on Graia has been contained. The planet is under quarantine by order of Inquisitor Thrax, and Titus is under investigation by the Inquisition on charges of heresy.

== Development ==
Developer Relic Entertainment recruited staff with experience of working on console titles to assist in the creation of the game. This included people who had worked on the Gears of War, God of War and Far Cry series.

Two sequels were planned but were cancelled due to the closure of THQ.

Sega took over publishing of the game following their acquisition of Relic Entertainment in 2013, and Relic began self-publishing following their split from Sega in 2024.

The soundtrack for Warhammer 40,000: Space Marine was composed by Cris Velasco and Sascha Dikiciyan.

== Release ==
THQ released a playable demo for Windows and Xbox 360 on August 23, 2011 and for PlayStation 3 on August 24, 2011. In Japan, it was published by CyberFront and released on October 27, 2011.

=== Retail editions ===
Multiple editions were released for the game:

- The "First Edition" was made available through Amazon in Germany and contains the base game along with the bonus Golden Relic Bolter weapon, along with the Emperor's Elite Pack and the Traitor Legions Pack.
- The "Limited Edition" contains all the contents of the "First Edition" along with the Golden Relic Chainsword weapon.
- A "Collector's Edition" of the game was released by THQ, containing the game along with physical extras including a replica purity seal, a hardcover art book, 25 collector's foil cards and the soundtrack. If the "Collector's Edition" was ordered from THQ, a free copy of Darksiders and the Power Sword pre-order bonus was also included.
- An "Ultimate Edition" was released containing the game and all additional DLC on the US PlayStation Store for the PlayStation 3.
- On September 23, 2021, Sega announced and released an "Anniversary Edition" of the game on Steam with it being a free update to owners of the original game. The "Anniversary Edition" includes the original game and all officially released DLC, as well as other digital items such as the soundtrack, strategy guide, art book, cards, ringtone, wallpapers, and the game's launch trailer.

=== Downloadable content ===
Several character skins and models for Space Marine and Chaos Marine chapters have been released, along with content that was originally reserved for those who preordered the game. A new wave-based game mode called "Exterminatus" was also made available for free download.

A downloadable content (DLC) package titled Chaos Unleashed was released on December 20, 2011. It adds a new mode to Exterminatus where players can take on the role of Chaos Space Marines as they fight both the Ork horde and Imperial Guard forces. The pack also includes three new multiplayer maps: Habs Ablaze, Station Tertius, and Aquila Canyon, which can be played in all multiplayer game modes, and ten new achievements and trophies.

An additional DLC package, Dreadnought, was released on January 24, 2012. This premium add-on added a new multiplayer mode called "Dreadnought Assault", in which two teams battle to capture a central location on the map and the winners spawn a player-controlled Dreadnought. The Dreadnought is armed with an Assault Cannon / Autocannon, a Meltagun and a Power Fist / Power Claw and the team must capture points across the map to score points. The DLC also includes three new multiplayer maps: Desolation, Dome Mechanicus, and Chem Refinery.

== Reception ==
Reception

Aggregate score
Aggregator	Score		
Aggregator	PC	PS3	Xbox 360
Metacritic	74/100	70/100	76/100

Review scores
Publication	Score		
Publication	PC	PS3	Xbox 360
Destructoid	N/A	N/A	8/10
Digital Trends	N/A	N/A	8/10
Eurogamer	N/A	6/10	N/A
Game Informer	N/A	8/10	8/10
GameRevolution	N/A	B−	B−
GameSpot	7/10	7/10	7/10
GameSpy	3.5/5	N/A	N/A
GameTrailers	N/A	N/A	7.6/10
Giant Bomb	4/5	N/A	4/5
IGN	7.5/10	7.5/10	7.5/10
Joystiq	N/A	N/A	4/5
Official Xbox Magazine (US)	N/A	N/A	8/10
PC Gamer (UK)	82%	N/A	N/A
PlayStation: The Official Magazine	N/A	8/10	N/A
Digital Spy	N/A	4/5	N/A
The Escapist	4/5	N/A	N/A

Warhammer 40,000: Space Marine received "mixed or average" reviews on Windows and PlayStation 3, while the Xbox 360 version received "generally favorable" reviews, according to review aggregator website Metacritic.

IGN praised the re-creation of the Warhammer 40,000 universe and the variety in the enemy encounters. The A.V. Club gave the Xbox 360 version a B+, saying, "Fortunately, it isn't pure fan service: It offers a fast-paced, gory start to a promising new franchise." GamePro gave the game four stars out of five and complimented the visuals of the game and the blending of hack-and-slash and shooter gameplay, but criticized the campaign, claiming that it was linear and that some of the environments were uninspired. The Daily Telegraph gave the Xbox 360 version three-and-a-half stars out of five, saying that it "can't compete with the genre leaders in terms of spectacle, budget and direction. And one has to question the wisdom of releasing in such close proximity to Gears of War 3. But for Warhammer 40k fans, or those who just can't wait to engage in a little alien slaughter, Space Marine's solid genre mash-up should prove a satisfying battle ground." However, Edge gave the PS3 version a score of five out of ten, saying, "Despite the air of brutality Space Marine tries to cultivate, it's ultimately defined by convenience; by linear levels where you follow the green lights of unlocked doors from one corridor to the next, while the gentle trickle of upgrades and new weapons does just enough to keep you playing. The result is sometimes casually enjoyable, but never vivid, or memorable, or truly involving."

The Escapist gave the PC version a score of four stars out of five, saying that it "combines gameplay elements to nail the feel of being a 7 foot armored tool of destruction. The game will simply leave you wanting more in both good and few bad ways." Digital Spy gave the PlayStation 3 version a similar score of four stars out of five, saying, "The game moves along nicely, eliminating potential problems with repetition; the graphics are great and the multiplayer is enormous fun, despite a few technical problems. OK, so Warhammer 40,000: Space Marine isn't the most original of games, or the most innovative, but it is finely polished and paced, and offers enough entertainment to overlook any shortcomings." The Digital Fix gave the Xbox 360 version a score of seven out of ten, saying that it "seems a bit of a rough diamond; certainly, expectations were high prior to release and if you dig into the meat of the multiplayer you will find a game worthy of your attention and time." However, 411Mania gave the same Xbox 360 version six out of ten, saying that it "ends up looking like a generic knock-off of the games it had a hand in creating creatively." Metro gave the PS3 version a similar score of six out of ten, saying, "The one note action might be pitch perfect, but the lack of variety or any real tactical depth soon drowns it out."

== Sequel ==
On December 9, 2021 Saber Interactive and Focus Entertainment announced Warhammer 40,000: Space Marine 2 with a cinematic trailer. It was confirmed that Captain Titus would be making his return and had become a Primaris Space Marine. The trailer featured Tyranids as enemies, replacing Orks from the original game. It was also announced that the voice role of Titus had been recast, and he would be voiced by Clive Standen.
