= Warhammer 40,000: Dawn of War II – Chaos Rising =

2010 video game

- Developer: Relic Entertainment
- Publishers: THQ (former); Sega (current)
- Producers: Jeff Lydell; Mark Noseworthy
- Designers: Daniel Kading; Jonny Ebbert
- Programmer: Beau Brennen
- Artists: Ian Cumming; Michael J. Moore
- Writers: Philippe R. Boulle; Will Hindmarch
- Series: Warhammer 40,000
- Engine: Essence Engine 2.0
- Platforms: Microsoft Windows, OS X, Linux
- Release: Windows: NA: March 11, 2010; EU: March 12, 2010; Linux, OS X: WW: September 29, 2016
- Genre: Real-time strategy
- Modes: Single-player, Multiplayer

Warhammer 40,000: Dawn of War II – Chaos Rising is a real-time strategy video game developed by Relic Entertainment and published by THQ, and the sequel expansion of Warhammer 40,000: Dawn of War II. The game was released on March 11, 2010 for Games for Windows.

Chaos Space Marines are introduced in the game and all the races in the previous game (Space Marines, Eldar, Orks, and Tyranids) were given new units.

The game predominantly takes place on the ice-covered home-world of the Blood Ravens, Aurelia. Gabriel Angelos explains Aurelia was lost to the Warp for a thousand years, but has now reappeared along with an active Blood Ravens' beacon.

== Campaign ==
Chaos Rising is set one year after the events of Dawn of War II and the defeat of the Tyranid invasion (as well as the Eldar and Ork forces) of sub-sector Aurelia. The campaign marks the return of the Blood Raven heroes from the previous game, the Chaos Lord Eliphas from Dark Crusade, Derosa as the new governor of Meridian, and the heretical Vandis.

New to Dawn of War II: Chaos Rising is the Corruption System. In the campaign there are often multiple objectives which will complete a mission; depending on which one a player chooses to complete, they will become more or less corrupted. Corruption describes how close the player's Marines (i.e. the Force Commander, Jonah and the rest of the Squads under the player's command except for Davian Thule, who is the only member unaffected by corruption) are to turning to Chaos and betraying the Imperium of man. This is a conscious choice in the gameplay and will affect the ending of the game as well as what missions are available throughout the campaign for the player.

Two new environments are available in Chaos Rising to complement the three already available (the jungle/swamp terrain of Typhon, the deserts and canyons of Calderis, and the towering Gothic city-scape of Meridian).

=== Plot ===
The Force Commander and his strike force arrive on Aurelia, along with the newly requisitioned Strike Cruiser Retribution (replacing the Armageddon, destroyed over Typhon Primaris in the previous game), after receiving a Blood Ravens encoded distress signal. The distress signal turns out to be a trap, and the Blood Ravens are ambushed by traitor Guardsmen of House Vandis, the militia of the former governor of the subsector. After escaping the trap and leaving the area, the Force Commander and the Dreadnought Davian Thule move to rescue the Librarian Jonah Orion, who is under attack by Eldar forces that have unearthed ancient ruins and revived Wraithguards.

After receiving a distress call from newly installed Governor Elena Derosa, who had aided them against Vandis in the original campaign, the Blood Ravens proceed to Meridian's Angel Gate where bands of Orks, driven there by House Vandis forces, are looting the area. They later encounter Chaos Space Marines of the Black Legion who are attempting to take over Angel Forge, led by Eliphas the Inheritor, a former Dark Apostle of the Word Bearers who was believed to have been killed on Kronus in Dark Crusade. After halting the Chaos raid, a combined Imperial Guard-Blood Ravens strike force returns to Aurelia to attack Legion forces dug into the area. Resisting intense artillery barrages from House Vandis forces and wave upon wave of cultists, the Blood Ravens discover a Chaos Temple and after a gruesome battle against summoned Daemons, destroy it completely. Taunting them throughout their struggles is Araghast the Pillager, the Chaos Lord commanding the Black Legion forces.

After the Chaos Temple falls, the warp begins to tear the planet asunder which forces them to make an immediate evacuation. Araghast allows the Force Commander and his strike force to escape, and tells Eliphas that his vengeance can wait. Aboard the Retribution, a recording was found that implicates a traitor within the Chapter who gave Araghast's forces the transmitting codes that were used to ambush the Blood Ravens when they first arrived on Aurelia. The Blood Ravens then return to Meridian to aid the 85th Vendoland in recapturing Spire Legis. With the help of Sergeant Thaddeus (who requested to be on the mission, originally hailing from that region), they successfully weaken the Chaos and Heretic forces holding the area. They also destroy an Eldar strike force that was uncovering ancient ruins on Typhon with Sergeant Tarkus. After dispatching numerous problems, Space Marine Scouts on Calderis send out a distress call that they have been engaged by a substantial number of Chaos forces. With the help of Sergeant Cyrus, they save the initiates from certain death and kill a Chaos Sorcerer operating in the area. Soon after, a contingent of the Blood Ravens Honor Guard, led by Captain Apollo Diomedes, arrives. Diomedes, acting on behalf of the Blood Ravens' Chapter Master and Chief Librarian, Azariah Kyras, orders all Blood Ravens to cease all engagements with the Black Legion forces and return to their ships until further ordered.

Disgruntled by the orders but still loyal, the Blood Ravens return to the Retribution. Several highly encrypted transmissions are intercepted. However, despite their best efforts they are unable to fully dissipate the message's masking. Techmarine Martellus, having survived the Tyranid invasion, accesses the Astronomic Array on Typhon. He reports that he has recovered detailed information about the arrivals and departures of a giant Space Hulk, the Judgment of Carrion. The Space Hulk contains a logic engine system that is powerful enough to remove the masking on the intercepted messages. Meanwhile, investigating how heretic forces had duplicated a Blood Ravens signal, Cyrus is able to discover that the traitor is aboard the Retribution.

When the Space Hulk arrives as Martellus predicted, the Blood Ravens find the ship infested by a splinter of the Tyranid Hive fleet. The foul taint of the Warp also permeates the vessel, cutting their stay aboard extremely short. Not far into the Space Hulk, they discover the bodies of fallen Blood Ravens of the Fifth Company; mysteriously their gene-seeds have been prepared but not collected and stored by an Apothecary. Raising even more questions, the names of the fallen Marines are still marked as on-duty within the Chapter Honor Guard. After much progression throughout the ship, slaughtering innumerable feral Tyranids and recovering the remaining gene-seed with Librarian Jonah Orion, the Blood Ravens finally gain access into a large sealed vault that contains the logic engine system. Inside, numerous Space Marine corpses strew the floor, each puzzlingly with their gene-seeds prepared but not collected. While accessing the logic engine, they find a dataslate written by Apothecary Galan that details the expedition he and fellow Marines made onto the Space Hulk.

Galan was part of the expeditionary group led by the then-Librarian Azariah Kyras. The message contains references to a Daemon named Ulkair that was stalking them within the ship. The Daemon is seeking their gene-seed which compelled Apothecary Galan to try and hide them. Galan worries however that, eventually, the subtle whisperings of the Daemon might overcome them, he also worries for Kyras who has exerted much of his psychic strength in fending off the Daemon and his minions. Kyras seems apathetic about the death of his Battle Brothers and slight hints are made from Galan's description of events that point at slight corruption on his part.

Leaving the Space Hulk and allowing Martellus to analyze the newly acquired logic engine to unmasked messages of the traitor, the Blood Ravens answer to yet another distress signal from Governor Derosa. Chaos Forces have besieged the capital city of Meridian and are assaulting the Governor's palace itself. The Force Commander goes to the defense of the Governor and beats back multiple waves of Black Legion and Vandis Heretic forces on the palace's doorstep. The Blood Ravens receive a transmission on their private voice channels from Araghast the Pillager, mocking them and challenging them along with Sergeant Avitus to a duel. The Blood Ravens, despite orders from Diomedes, return to the chosen battlefield of Aurelia to answer Araghast's challenge. Araghast teleports away from the Blood Ravens using warp portals conjured with the aid of Eliphas, who begrudgingly serves as the Chaos Lord's lieutenant. As the Commander and his forces gained the upper hand, Araghast calls for Eliphas to open another portal to help him escape, but Eliphas betrays Araghast and refuses, leaving a furious Araghast to the mercy of the Blood Ravens. With Araghast slain, Eliphas takes command of the Black Legion forces.

Enthralled by the silencing of Araghast, the Blood Ravens remark the fitting end that a leader of traitors was, ironically, destroyed thanks to a traitor. Martellus, analyzing copious amounts of data, reports to the Force Commander that Apothecary Galan is still alive and also within the Honor Guard of the Blood Ravens. They also find yet another coded transmission from the traitor to Galan. But despite the threat posed by Chaos, Captain Diomedes orders all the Blood Ravens to leave the sub-sector immediately. Gabriel Angelos, unwilling to simply leave the Blood Ravens recruiting worlds to be corrupted by Chaos, orders the Force Commander and his squads to disregard Diomedes' orders. Angelos travels to Calderis where Diomedes is operating out of, and confronts him regarding the retreat order. Diomedes, acting in the name of Kyras, declares Angelos and his men traitors to the Chapter, and sends out a notice to all Blood Ravens to kill him on sight.

Knowing that Gabriel is no traitor, the Force Commander and his squads infiltrate Captain Diomedes's fire-base on Calderis. Within, they locate Apothecary Galan along with a host of Honor Guards that they find have all been corrupted by the forces of Chaos. The strike force attacks Galan and defeats him; in his dying moments, the Apothecary thanks them for freeing him from the influence of Chaos and tells them that everyone who had gone aboard the Judgment of Carrion had been corrupted, along with most of the men in the fire-base. Only Captain Diomedes himself is found to be pure of corruption, but is blinded by his pride. The strike force proceeds to the Honor Guard's Command Center where they hope to access its logs to expose the traitor on the Retribution. The Command Center is unfortunately destroyed and Captain Diomedes appears on the scene, branding the Commander and his men as heretics for what they have just done. The Commander and his squad explain to Diomedes what had transpired and the events on board the Judgment of Carrion. Diomedes was shocked to hear about it, along with the name of the daemon, and allows them to escape. Meanwhile, logs from Galan's dataslate that was found on board the Judgment of Carrion reveal that Kyras had fallen to Chaos long before the expedition. In addition, the Daemon Ulkair was imprisoned on Aurelia and they finally realize that Eliphas is planning to release him.

On Aurelia, Eliphas explains that just before the planet was taken by the Warp long ago, Kyras managed to imprison Ulkair after Kyras' master Moriah was killed in battle. Soon after, the warp descended upon the planet taking both Kyras and the Planet. Kyras, trapped within the warp, made a deal with Ulkair to guarantee his escape; Kyras returned centuries later aboard the Judgment of Carrion. Eliphas then sacrifices a captured Blood Raven scout and a plague champion to release Ulkair, a Great Unclean One - a Greater Daemon of Nurgle, the Chaos god of plague and decay. Ulkair thanks Eliphas for releasing him and promises him more power and control under its service. As the player and his squad return to Aurelia, they discover the identity of the traitor. The traitor varies based on the Corruption level of the squads under the player's control. The one with the highest Corruption is the traitor. If none of the player squads are corrupted, the traitor is Techmarine Martellus. The traitor immediately leaves the Retribution and joins with the Chaos force on the ground, and the Commander leads his loyal squads in pursuit to destroy him.

After they kill the traitor, he tells them that Ulkair has been revived and confirms that Kyras was corrupted by Chaos. Gabriel arrives with his battle barge, the Litany of Fury, and is informed by the Commander and his men of the traitor and the corruption of Kyras. Gabriel, wasting no time, launches a grand assault upon the ancient Blood Ravens chapter keep on Aurelia, where Kyras bound Ulkair. Making use of Predator tanks to secure a beachhead, numerous Chaos bases are destroyed as the Force Commander and his squad gather to assault Ulkair. As they begin to approach the Daemon, they are intercepted by Eliphas, who guards the only way to reach Ulkair. Before they can deal a killing blow, Eliphas is saved by the warp and escapes death yet again, leaving the Commander and his forces free to battle Ulkair. In a long and difficult battle, the Daemon is finally vanquished and sealed again. However, Ulkair remarks that no prison may hold him forever and that he will eventually return and slaughter them all.

Back aboard the Litany of Fury, Gabriel declares their victory over the Black Legion and Ulkair the Unclean One. He tells though of the greater challenges that await them, since Azariah Kyras has been corrupted by Chaos, the only thing that the Blood Ravens may do now is slay him. Gabriel then speaks to the Commander and his squad about their actions (which depends on the Corruption level of the Commander and his squads, and whether they chose to redeem Captain Diomedes or slay him on Calderis). Meanwhile, Eliphas awakens in a prison of some sort, where he is met by Warmaster Abaddon, the lord of the Black Legion. As Abaddon advances on him, Eliphas swears that as he promised, the Blood Ravens will fall.

=== Ending ===
Once the player reaches the end of the game, it gives out five endings that the player may receive depending on the player's redemption and corruption levels.

- Full Purity - If the player does all the redemption missions and kills Apothecary Galan and not Captain Diomedes, and only one of your squad leaders was corrupted before turning the traitor, the player's character and his squads will act as Agents of Purification within the Chapter and with the help of Gabriel and Diomedes after learning the truth about the Corruption within the Blood Ravens. The player's character is bestowed the position of Brother Captain of the Fourth Company.
- Purity - If the player kills Galan and spares Diomedes, but the corruption level of your squads is above zero, the player is marked as a renegade along with Gabriel, who commends the player character for being willing to oppose Kyras' command and for purging the corruption within his ranks, and calls for a rallying of others in the Chapter with similar courage to oppose Kyras and the forces of Chaos.
- Neutral - If the player does both redemption and corruption in all of the missions (Killing all the Blood Ravens, and not killing both Diomedes and Galan), the player's character will be banished from the chapter and exiled to the Eye of Terror for a hundred years and sentenced to pay for his sins with his blood or the blood of his enemies.
- Corruption - If the player has greater corruption points than his redemption, player's character will be executed for heresy by Gabriel using his Thunder Hammer.
- Full Corruption - If the player does all of the corruption missions and has a full level of corruption in all of his squads, the player's character becomes the next Chaos Lord of the Black Legion war-band on Aurelia and is Gabriel's next target.

==== Canonical ending ====
In the Space Marine Campaign in Dawn of War II: Retribution, it's revealed that Apollo Diomedes is alive and still serves under Chapter Master Kyras, but still refuses to believe that the Chapter Master serves Chaos even though he was convinced of his honor guard's corruption on Calderis. Tactical Sergeant Tarkus reveals that the traitor of the Force Commander's strike-force was Devastator Sergeant Avitus, who served with him on Kronus. After he slew Avitus, Tarkus makes an oath of silence and is dubbed as "The Ancient". Scout Sergeant Cyrus, Techmarine Martellus and Librarian Jonah Orion still serve under Captain Gabriel Angelos and Captain Davian Thule was killed in the prologue mission of the Chaos Campaign (non-canonical) but does not appear in any other campaign. Assault Sergeant Thaddeus was never mentioned and the player Force Commander was marked as a renegade alongside Angelos by Kyras after he kept his exposure to corruption at a minimum.

== Reception ==
Reception

Aggregate scores
Aggregator	Score
GameRankings	85.39%
Metacritic	84/100

Review scores
Publication	Score
1Up.com	A-
Eurogamer	9/10
GamePro	4.5/5
GameSpot	8.5/10
GameSpy	4/5
GameTrailers	8.5/10
IGN	8.5/10

Chaos Rising received "generally positive" reviews, according to review aggregator Metacritic.

During the 14th Annual Interactive Achievement Awards, the Academy of Interactive Arts & Sciences nominated Chaos Rising for "Strategy/Simulation Game of the Year".
