= Relic Entertainment =

Canadian video game developer

Relic Entertainment Inc.
- Formerly: THQ Canada Inc. (2004–2013)
- Type: Private
- Industry: Video games
- Founded: May 1997; 29 years ago
- Founders: Alex Garden; Luke Moloney; Erin Daly; Aaron Kambeitz; Rob Cunningham; Gary Shaw; Shane Alfreds
- Headquarters: Vancouver, British Columbia, Canada
- Key people: Justin Dowdeswell (CEO)
- Products: Homeworld series; Dawn of War series; Company of Heroes series
- Parent: THQ (2004–2013); Sega (2013–2024)
- Website: relic.com

Relic Entertainment Inc. (formerly known as THQ Canada Inc.) is a Canadian video game developer based in Vancouver, founded in 1997. The studio specializes in real-time strategy games and is known for series such as Homeworld, Warhammer 40,000: Dawn of War and Company of Heroes. Acquired by THQ in 2004, the company was sold to Sega on January 22, 2013, as part of THQ's bankruptcy and operated under its European division. By May 2024, Relic had secured a partnership with an external investment group, allowing it to split from Sega and operate independently.

== History ==
=== Founding and Homeworld (1997–2004) ===
Relic was founded in May 1997 by Alex Garden, Luke Moloney, Erin Daly, Aaron Kambeitz, Rob Cunningham, Gary Shaw, and Shane Alfreds. The name of the company was chosen because they liked the name and it was easy to pronounce. Their first title, Homeworld, was released on September 28, 1999, to critical acclaim and successful sales. Though they did not immediately continue working on the franchise (Sierra Entertainment, the game's publisher, owned the rights), the game did have a spin-off, Homeworld: Cataclysm, developed by Barking Dog Studios and published by Sierra.

Their next title was Impossible Creatures, released by Microsoft on January 7, 2003. It focused on a fictional environment during the 1930s, allowing players to design units from different anatomical parts of animals. The game was successful, though it did not receive the same attention as Homeworld.

Homeworld 2 was released on September 16, 2003. Although it boasted improved graphics and features and changed some elements of gameplay from the original, reviews cited some issues and did not score it as highly as its predecessor.

=== Acquisition by THQ (2004–2013) ===
On April 27, 2004, publisher THQ announced it was acquiring Relic for close to US$10 million in an all-cash transaction, completed around early May 2004.

Relic released Warhammer 40,000: Dawn of War on September 20, 2004, a real-time strategy game based on Games Workshop's popular Warhammer 40,000 franchise. The game was a success, with many reviewers applauding its innovative resource management system and squad-based interface. As a series Warhammer 40,000: Dawn of War has sold more than 7 million copies worldwide as of January 2013. Following up on the success of Dawn of War, Relic released an expansion pack entitled Warhammer 40,000: Dawn of War: Winter Assault on September 23, 2005. The expansion added a fifth faction, the Imperial Guard, to the game, as well as giving the existing races several new units. The expansion was mildly successful, although it did not have the impact of the original game. Warhammer 40,000: Dawn of War: Dark Crusade, a second, standalone expansion pack for Dawn of War, was released on October 9, 2006.

Relic's first foray into the console world of gaming, The Outfit, was released on March 13, 2006, for the Xbox 360. Not very successful, many reviewers saw it as a love-it-or-hate-it game. It was also criticized for its weak single-player modes.

Company of Heroes, a World War II-themed real-time strategy game, was released on September 12, 2006. It used Relic's new Essence engine. The engine, which had been designed in-house by Relic, featured many next-generation graphical effects, including HDR and dynamic lighting, as well as utilizing the Havok middleware physics engine. The game was very successful and won many awards from multiple gaming magazines and websites. As of January 2013, the Company of Heroes series has sold more than 4 million copies worldwide. On September 25, 2007, Company of Heroes: Opposing Fronts, the stand alone expansion pack to Company of Heroes was released. It introduced two new playable armies, the British 2nd Army and the German Panzer Elite. On November 3, 2008, Relic announced a second Company of Heroes stand-alone expansion, Company of Heroes: Tales of Valor, which was released on April 9, 2009. This expansion introduced a new campaign, new units, weapons, game play features and three new game types.

There has been speculation supported through various sources that Relic has re-acquired the rights to the Homeworld franchise from Vivendi. Finally, following the discovery of a document on the United States Patent and Trademark Office's electronic filing system by a fan, THQ confirmed that Relic indeed owns the trademark again, making a continuation of the series under THQ's lead possible. However, no comment on future installments was given.

Relic released the sequel to Dawn of War, Warhammer 40,000: Dawn of War II, on February 18, 2009. It featured the introduction of the Tyranids to the Dawn of War series. In an attempt to avoid recent complaints about digital rights management, Relic chose to release Dawn of War II on Steam and use Games for Windows – Live to arrange multiplayer matches. Subsequently, expanded with Warhammer 40,000: Dawn of War II – Chaos Rising in March 2010, and Warhammer 40,000: Dawn of War II – Retribution in March 2011, the latter saw the multiplayer platform move to Steamworks.

In early September 2011, Relic released its second cross platform console title, Warhammer 40,000: Space Marine. It was released for PC, PlayStation 3 and Xbox 360 on September 6, 2011, in North America and September 9, 2011, in Europe. It features the Ultramarines chapter. Its gameplay focuses on a hybrid shooting and melee combat model.

In May 2012, Relic Entertainment announced it was developing the highly anticipated sequel Company of Heroes 2 for the PC platform, scheduled for release in early 2013. In this sequel the game moves the battle away from the Western Front of World War II and refocuses on the Eastern Front.

=== Acquisition by Sega (2013–2024) ===
In December 2012, during THQ bankruptcy filings, it was revealed that Relic Entertainment "is currently developing Company of Heroes 2 for a calendar year 2013 release and a new game with the working title Atlas for a release in calendar year 2014." On January 23, 2013, it was revealed that THQ had sold Relic Entertainment to Sega for US$26.6 million as part of an auction of the company's properties. Sega outbid ZeniMax Media by $300,000. The Homeworld franchise was sold to Gearbox Software at a separate auction in April 2013.

In November 2015, Relic Entertainment and Sega relinquished the rights of Impossible Creatures to THQ Nordic after it was revealed that neither THQ nor Microsoft Studios owned the rights to the video game. In May 2016, Relic Entertainment announced Warhammer 40,000: Dawn of War III, which was released for personal computers in 2017.

On August 21, 2017, Microsoft announced that Relic will develop Age of Empires IV.

On July 12, 2021, Relic Entertainment announced Company of Heroes 3 for PC to be released late 2022. It was revealed the game is in pre-alpha stage and that they have "been co-developing the game with the community members for years now." On May 23, 2023, three months to the day after the release of Company of Heroes 3, it was reported that Sega would be laying off more than 120 employees at Relic, blaming external factors negatively impacting the wider industry.

=== Split from Sega (2024–present) ===
On March 28, 2024, Relic Entertainment announced that an external investor had assisted it in going independent. One week later, the studio laid off over 40 employees.

== Technology ==
The Essence Engine featured many new graphical effects at the time it was introduced, including high-dynamic-range lighting, dynamic lighting and shadows, advanced shader effects and normal mapping. The Essence Engine is also one of the first RTS engines to create detailed faces with facial animations.

In Company of Heroes: Opposing Fronts, the Essence Engine was further improved to include weather effects, and also added support for DirectX 10 on Windows Vista.

Dawn of War II uses an updated version of Essence Engine (Essence 2.0) which allows for more detailed models and textures; more advanced lighting and shading effects; more complex "sync-kills" than those in Dawn of War; and better support for multi-processor systems.

Company of Heroes 2 is the first game to feature the 3rd generation of the Essence Engine (Essence 3.0) which features DirectX 11 support. Improvement to the engine featured in the game include the new line-of-sight technology, TrueSight, which aims to better emulate troop visibility in real combat. In contrast to traditional unit visibility, TrueSight more accurately represents a unit's visibility range based on environmental conditions and type of unit. Essence 3.0 also incorporates a weather-simulating technology known as ColdTech which allows for realistic obstacles and destructible environments.

== Awards ==
- Best Developer, IGN.com Best of 2006 Awards
