= Warhammer 40,000: Dawn of War – Dark Crusade =

- Developer(s): Relic Entertainment
- Publisher(s): THQ (Note: Originally published by THQ. Publishing rights picked up by Sega in 2013 upon THQ's bankruptcy. Currently self-published by Relic Entertainment after split from Sega.)
- Producer(s): Jonathan Dowdeswell
- Designer(s): Jonny Ebbert
- Programmer(s): Nick Waanders
- Artist(s): Ian Cumming
- Composer(s): Inon Zur
- Series: Warhammer 40,000
- Platform(s): Microsoft Windows
- Release: NA: October 9, 2006; AU: October 29, 2006; EU: November 3, 2006
- Genre(s): Real-time strategy
- Mode(s): Single-player, multiplayer

Warhammer 40,000: Dawn of War – Dark Crusade is the second expansion to the real-time strategy video game Warhammer 40,000: Dawn of War developed by Relic Entertainment and published by THQ. Based on Games Workshop's tabletop wargame, Warhammer 40,000, Dark Crusade was released on October 9, 2006. The expansion features two new races, the Tau Empire and the Necrons. Including the Imperial Guard from Dawn of War's first expansion pack Winter Assault, a total of seven playable races in this expansion.

Unlike Winter Assault, Dark Crusade is a standalone expansion that does not require prior installation of Dawn of War or Winter Assault to play, allowing the user to play as all seven factions in both single player Skirmish and Campaign modes.

Parallel to the release of Dark Crusade, THQ also released a triple pack of Dawn of War, Winter Assault, and Dark Crusade, dubbed Dawn of War Anthology. The case is embossed with images of all the faction leaders of the campaign dressed in their respective wargear.

== Gameplay ==
Khorne Berzerkers attacking an Imperial Guard listening post.

As with previous Dawn of War titles, Dark Crusade is focused on the conflict part of gameplay; in order to obtain more resources players must fight over them. Each player starts off with a base and wins by fulfilling mission objectives. There are multiple tiers of technology, with each allowing for more powerful units and upgrades.

The Tau fighting the Necrons for a Control Point.

=== Campaign ===
Unlike the previous games in the series, Dark Crusade features a non-linear sandbox campaign in which the factions compete for control of Kronus. The player begins the campaign by selecting a faction. Campaign gameplay is broken into rounds consisting of two phases, the world map and the battle map.

==== World Map ====
The world map is divided into territories, each of which can be captured and controlled by the various factions. Each faction starts with a "stronghold" territory, that faction's home base. Each faction also has an army led by that faction's leader. Every round, the player may move his or her army to an adjacent allied territory, or attack an adjacent enemy territory. When the player attacks a territory, gameplay will transition to a real-time battle in the battle map (see next section). After the player's turn, the NPC factions will each take a turn where they move their army and/or attack. If an NPC attacks a territory controlled by the player, the player is given the option to auto-resolve the battle based on the relative strengths of the territory and attacking faction, or to play out the battle in the battle map.

Capturing a faction's stronghold territory will remove that faction from the game; likewise, if the player's stronghold is captured, he or she will lose the game. Other territories, when captured, grant bonus abilities or the ability to manufacture "honor guard" units for the player's army. Each owned territory produces a "planetary requisition" resource that can be used to purchase honor guard units or garrison standard units on the player's owned territories.

==== Battle Map ====
The battle map is where attack and defense actions are resolved. This is a traditional real-time battle similar to previous games in the series. Some offensive battles, particularly to capture enemy strongholds, feature scripted and story driven missions similar to campaign missions in the previous Dawn of War games. Other offensive battles, and all defensive battles, play out as generic skirmishes where the objective is to destroy all enemy bases. Notably, the game includes a "persistent bases" feature: any structure that the player builds in a battle will be present in future battles when the player defends that territory (unless the structure is destroyed). Research upgrades are not persistent and must be re-acquired in each battle as normal.

During an attack, the player will start the battle with his or her faction's commander unit and any active honor guard units. Honor guard units that survive the battle can be used in the next attack action. During a defense, the player will start with any units garrisoned in the territory. If the defense takes place at the territory where the player's army is currently located, the player will also start the battle with the commander and honor guard units. NPC armies also have commander and honor guard units that follow the same rules.

=== Units ===
The number of units a player may field at one time is determined by population and vehicle 'squad caps'; these limit the number of infantry troops and vehicles a player may have on the battlefield. Squad caps may be increased using methods differing between races. Most units have a melee attack and a ranged attack. Units are often specialized to be better using one attack type. All units also have stances; these affect how the units respond to enemies. There are four types of units: commanders, infantry, heavy infantry and vehicles.

Commanders are hero units, and can usually only be built once. If they perish, they may be rebuilt. A sub-class is the semi-commander unit, which has many abilities like the commander unit but may be built multiple times. Infantry are foot soldiers, and may either be regular or heavy, with heavy infantry being much tougher than normal infantry. Vehicles are heavy weaponry and transports, and include tanks, artillery, troop carriers and walkers.

Most units come in squads. These are groups of infantry that are commanded as a single entity. They may be reinforced with additional members, equipped with special weapons, or be attached to hero units. Some squads have special abilities, such as grenades, teleportation, and stealth, unlocked with research or leader units. Unit longevity is determined by their health and morale points, which govern a squad's fighting effectiveness. Both are reduced by weaponry; morale recharges independently or due to unit abilities, while health is increased by healer units or repair, with some units also able to heal themselves. The Necrons have the ability to reassemble themselves and spawn again.

=== Multiplayer ===
Players may either connect directly by IP connection, or play on their LAN. There are eight game modes available for online skirmish play, such as Annihilate, which requires the player to destroy every enemy buildings capable of unit production or Sudden Death, which causes a player to be eliminated if another captures one of their strategic points. Multiple game modes may be enabled, calling for multiple winning conditions. Due to its nature as a standalone expansion pack, the player may only play as the Tau or Necrons in multiplayer. They may enter their original Dawn of War CD key to gain access to the original four races. Likewise, a Winter Assault CD key is needed to access the Imperial Guard.

== Plot ==
=== Setting ===
After the Eldar on Lorn V break their alliance with the Imperial Guard during the events of Winter Assault, the Guard form a task force led by Colonel Lukas Aleksander to hunt their leader, Farseer Taldeer. The awakening of Necrons on the fringe planet of Kronus causes Taldeer to travel there with Aleksander in pursuit. The planet has been under the tenuous control of the Tau Empire for centuries, having wrested it from the Imperium of Mankind and subjugated its human population. The protagonist of Fire Warrior, Kais, leads the Tau forces arriving on the planet. Feral Orks are combined into a force by the arrival of Warboss Gorgutz, who killed the former ruler of Lorn V, the Chaos Lord Crull. The Chaos Lord Eliphas commanding forces from the Chaos Undivided warband Word Bearers arrives in turn to conquer the world and retrieve Crull's skull. Blood Raven Space Marines under the charge of Captain Davian Thule are tasked by Chapter Master Azariah Kyras to purge the world and retrieve relics and information pertaining to the chapter's early history. However, Thule's orders lead him into conflict with the Imperial Guard forces.

=== Possible Endings ===
- Tau: The Tau regain control of Kronus. Imperial Guard forces and human dissidents are forced into reeducation camps. Humanity becomes a small minority on Kronus, with mass sterilization rumored to have been undertaken.
- Chaos: Eliphas ascends into Daemonhood, uses Kronus as a staging point, and leads Chaos forces in the most devastating offensive since the Horus Heresy.
- Necron: The Necrons purge Kronus of all life, and campaigns throughout nearby systems, repelling all attempts at retaking the planet.
- Ork: Gorgutz uses the planet as a recruiting ground for his later campaigns.
- Imperial Guard: Aleksander remains on the planet as its Imperial governor. He yields command of his regiment, passing it to his deputy.
- Eldar: Taldeer leaves the planet after putting enemy forces into chaos, leaving it as anarchic, contested by warlords.

=== Canonical Plot ===
The canonical plot of the game follows the Blood Ravens. The Blood Ravens defeat the Imperial Guard and kill Colonel Aleksander. The survivors are given treatment and evacuated off-world. The Blood Ravens then defeat the Eldar, capturing and then executing their leader, Taldeer. The Word Bearers are defeated and Eliphas' body is destroyed by a daemon. The Necron Lord of Kronus is destroyed by Thule, though he loses an eye in the process. The Tau and Orks are defeated by an unknown force. With the Blood Ravens victorious, the world is returned to the Imperium of Man, though not before it is purged and pillaged. The Imperial Guard report the Blood Ravens to the Imperial Inquisition, though Thule and his officers manage to convince the Inquisition that their actions were justified. However, the victory on Kronus precedes the revelation of Kyras' allegiance to Chaos, and the defeat of the Blood Ravens in the Kaurava System.

=== Campaign ===
The expansion features a "Risk-based strategic layer", a campaign including a "meta-map", similar to that in Westwood Studios's Dune games as opposed to the programmed, linear storylines of previous versions. Due to this lack of linearity, there is no plot aside from the opening cinematic; rather, as the player conquers various opposing factions the game provides a narrative specific to whom the player has conquered. If the player wins the campaign, a cinematic is played that depends on which faction the player was controlling.

The player may pick a faction to play as, and then engages in turn-based combat with the other A.I.-controlled factions. There are multiple provinces, which are conquered by fighting a regular skirmish match over them. These may either give a special bonus or supply special 'honour guard' units, which are powerful, non-trainable versions of regular units. They may only be made on the main battlefield overview screen, and, like provincial reinforcements, cost planetary requisition, a resource gained on a per-turn basis based on how many provinces the player controls. Honour guard units transfer over provinces and may be used repeatedly. There are also seven 'Stronghold' provinces that function as bases for respective factions; these are made like more traditional campaign games, with multiple secondary and primary objectives that vary from faction to faction.

The Tau commander, equipped with a majority of wargear upgrades.

Also, a race's commander unit may be upgraded with special "wargear", unique, customizable upgrades that vary by race. These are awarded at battle milestones, ranging from a certain amount of kills to conquering many provinces.

Campaign scenarios are persistent, meaning that all player structures are 'saved' when a game is won. For example, if a player builds a base and conquers a province, only to have a neighbouring faction attack aforementioned province, the player will start out with all the buildings of the previous base, as well as any building upgrades. However, the player's researched technologies will not be carried over and must be reacquired. The AI always begin with their bases at the same location on the map, with the exact number of bases and the buildings they contain dependent on their strength level and progression into the Campaign. If the player has previously built structures near the location of an enemy base, these structures may be cleared to make room for the AI's starting structures. Players may also choose to garrison provinces with units that are instantly available should the province be attacked. These are bought with planetary requisition.

== Setting ==
=== Races ===
All five of the pre-existing factions gain new units, and two new playable races are available.

==== Tau Empire ====
One of the two newer races, the Tau are unique in multiple ways. Tau warriors and vehicles are powerful in ranged battles, but lack melee prowess; their commander even lacks a melee attack entirely. Many Tau units tend to be relatively fragile, few in number, and expensive. To compensate, they fight alongside the alien Kroot, using these primal warriors as auxiliaries. Also, they are the only race with a 'choice' in their final technology choices; two final tier buildings are presented, which provide different end-game units and technologies. Only one may be chosen. The Tau also do not have any standalone defensive structures or minefields. However one of their Heavy Infantry; the Broadside Battlesuit, can be entrenched and use its shoulder mounted railguns, effectively making them into turrets.

==== Necrons ====
The Necrons are unique, as they do not require requisition to build their army. All units are in and of themselves free of requisition point cost. Power is the only resource Necrons need, in order to perform research, construct buildings and to construct and reinforce squads. However, capturing Strategic Points and building Obelisks (the Necrons listening post) on them will increase the speed of research and building, and will also expand the population cap. The Necron Monolith, their home base, is restored as more buildings are built, while also unlocking new units, and functions as the only vehicle- and troop-producing building. When fully restored it becomes mobile (albeit very slow, though it can teleport) and is armed with powerful weaponry. Many Necron units have the ability to resurrect, and most will leave persistent corpses on the battlefield that may either self-resurrect after they die or be restored by specialized Necron units (this resurrection can actually allow the Necrons to go over their population cap).

Necrons were previously seen in Winter Assault at the end of the single-player campaign, but noticeably stronger.

== Development ==
Dark Crusade uses the same engine as the original Dawn of War game, which allowed game developer Relic to focus most efforts on revamping the single-player campaign and balancing out the two new races. By E3 2006, the two new races were demonstrated through an in-engine feature, though no playable version was showcased. New units were unveiled regularly after August 11. The first available playable build was released on September 18 to GameSpot. Dark Crusade exited the development stage on September 21, and was expected to be shipped worldwide by October 9.

== Reception ==
Reception

Aggregate scores
Aggregator	Score
GameRankings	87/100
Metacritic	87/100

Review scores
Publication	Score
GameSpot	8.8/10
IGN	8.7/10
PC Gamer (US)	79/100

The expansion was praised as an "excellent real-time strategy game", with its non-linear single-player campaign, stabilized multiplayer and additional features, and was selected by IGN and GameSpot as the best expansion pack of 2006. Most were quite surprised by the quality and size of the expansion, stating that the large amount of new content "[breathed] new life into the game". Critics cited the excellent balancing between races, saying it had a positive effect on both single-player and multiplayer. Aside from new units and races, changes to the gameplay mechanics, such as reworking of the elite unit system, were well-received, as critics felt that the changes "forced players to actually think about using real combined arms tactics in multiplayer and contributed to more games decided by genuine strategy and skill rather than just who can spec out the proper build order."

Some critics stated that the game's weak points included its complexity; some reviewers disliked how much micromanagement was required to effectively field one race against another, saying that this complexity was detrimental to the game. As one reviewer mentioned, "...when I stop having fun, I stop playing." The learning curve was also stated as being very steep for an RTS, due to each race being different. Another thing critics disliked was the player's inability to 'zoom out' with the in-game camera; this sometimes got in the way of large battles, and was especially noticeable when playing as or against the Tau, as their long-range weapons often resulted in them engaging their targets off-screen. While general consensus on the revamped single-player campaign was positive, some critics felt that it was not particularly challenging; they found that the AI was strategically weak, and there were no random elements in most skirmish missions that would enhance replayability. The usage of a random auto-resolve feature to determine which races won which territories was seen as a downside; also, one critic found that the AI attacked his homebase very rarely, and that they would attack insignificant zones regardless of the opportunity to capture more significant ones. In terms of new additions, some critics felt that the races, in particular the Necrons, were overpowered.

Dark Crusade won Computer Games Magazine's 2006 "Expansion of the Year" award. The editors wrote, "With this expansion, Dawn of War has become the ultimate Warhammer game."
