= Rich Keeble =

British actor

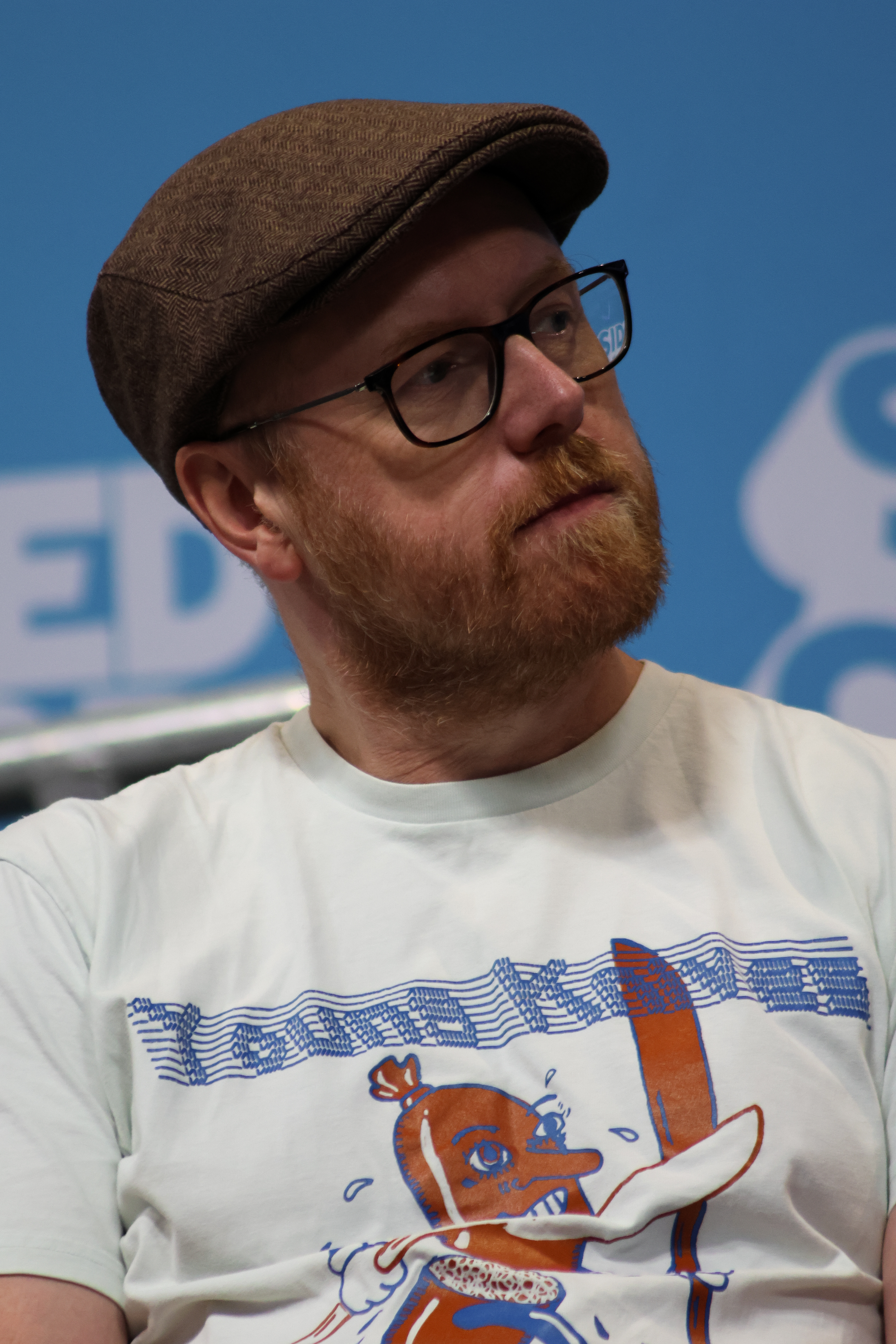
- Keeble at MCM Birmingham 2026
- Years active: 2010-Present

Rich Keeble is a British actor and voiceover artist. He is known for appearances in TV series including Brian Hetherington in Rivals (2024-present), Mr Arnold in Good Omens (2023), Trevor in The Change (2023-2025), and various characters in The Emily Atack Show (2020-2021). Other TV appearances include Ghosts (2022), The Beaker Girls (2023) and Trying (2022).

He is also known for his voice acting in video games including Monoco and other characters in Clair Obscur: Expedition 33 (2025), for which he longlisted for a BAFTA, Two-Face / Harvey Dent in Lego Batman: Legacy of the Dark Knight (2026), Fenrico in Wuthering Waves (2025), and Frank Fairburne in Strange Brigade (2018).

== Early life ==
Keeble attended Tiffin School in Kingston upon Thames in the 1990s.

== Career ==
=== Television, film and online ===
Between 2010 and 2015, Keeble appeared as various characters in sketches for Lee Nelson's Well Good Show, Alan Carr's Summertime Specstacular, Alan Carr's New Year Specstacular, hidden camera show Fool Britannia (starring Dom Joly), and had small roles in sitcoms Birds of a Feather and The Delivery Man. In 2013, he appeared in a recurring ident on the BBC directed by Victoria Pile, playing the character of Gary whose living room is invaded by a panda played by Steve Marsh.

In 2015 he portrayed Dr. Williams in the drama thriller film Survivors.

Keeble co-writes and stars in the comedy web series Rich Keeble Vanity Project which won the "Best UK Series" award at UK Web Fest, and later won "Best British Web Series" at the 2017 Pilot Light TV Festival, and "Best Supporting Actor (comedy)" (for co-star Sam Legassick) at the Indie Series Awards. It was also nominated for "Best UK Series" and "Best Writing" in the web series competition of the 24th Raindance Film Festival.

In November 2016 he regularly appeared on the entertainment television series Animal Antics on Viasat Nature, directed by Nick Mavroidakis (Rude Tube). In March 2017 he appeared in Comedy Central's Bad Snappers and Channel 4's The Last Leg, appearing as a journalist in a sketch with Mr Blobby, and in another episode as an archaeologist discovering the remains of hosts Adam Hills, Josh Widdicombe and Alex Brooker. He appeared in an episode of The Rebel with Simon Callow in November 2017.

He provided the voice of the radio DJ on the Halloween special live episode of Inside No.9 broadcast on BBC Two on 28 October 2018. He was 'Richard the lawyer' in the 2018 Christmas special of Through the Keyhole, with Keith Lemon and Christopher Biggins.

In March 2019, he portrayed PC Mortimer in Series 2 of Porters (Dave). He also played three characters in the BBC1 sitcom Warren - Shop Assistant and two other voice roles (Radio Presenter and Taxi Operator). Keeble stars as William in the film Criminal Audition, which premiered at London FrightFest 2019. He has received a positive critical reception for his performance. In December 2019, he appeared as Mark Waddington in the BBC soap opera Doctors.

In 2022 he appeared as Toby in the fourth series of Ghosts. That year he also appeared as Tom Taylor the tree surgeon in Not Going Out, group leader Jared in Trying on Apple TV, and as a priest marrying Johnny Vegas and Sian Gibson's characters in Murder, They Hope. He also appeared in Kiell Smith-Bynoe's Channel 4 Blap, Red Flag.

In 2023 he appeared opposite Matthew Macfadyen in ITV drama, Stonehouse, and in an episode of The Beaker Girls on CBBC, playing Scott, a disgruntled cafe owner who gets Tracey Beaker arrested. Later that year he appeared as a room service waiter in Not Going Out, as Trevor in The Change, and as Mr Arnold in Series 2 of Good Omens.

In 2024 he appeared in Truelove opposite Phil Davis and Lindsay Duncan, Meet the Richardsons playing Jon Richardson's dentist, Kaos, Rivals playing TV director Brian Hetherington (reunited with Good Omens co-star David Tennant), and Christmas comedy film Bad Tidings with Lee Mack and Chris McCausland.

He also appears in the music video for the Young Knives single "Dissolution".

=== Voice work ===
He played the character Frank Fairburne in Strange Brigade, released 28 August 2018.

In 2023 he portrayed the Mouth of Sauron in The Lords of the Rings: Gollum video game.

=== Stage ===
In January 2011 he starred as British double agent Donald MacLean in A Morning with Guy Burgess at the Courtyard Theatre, London, written by John Morrison and based on the life of Guy Burgess. The play was featured on The Review Show on BBC Two. In 2014 he appeared in the comedy sketch show Kaile, Keeble & Kuntz with Luke Kaile at the Edinburgh Fringe.

== Filmography ==
=== Film ===
Year	Title	Role	Notes
2010	Made in Dagenham	West Ham Supporter	
2011	scAIRcrows	Ben	Short
2011	A Life, Unfulfilled	Michael Raznik	Short
2012	Girls Just Wanna Have Fun		Short
2012	A Slightly Exaggerated Reenactment of a Voicemail I Never Actually Left for Tom Lenk		Short
2012	Amina	Job Seeker	
2013	Eva's Diamond	Oregano	
2013	You're a Vision	Simon	Short
2013	Rehab	TV Executive	
2014	Tunstall	Dr. Samuel Johnson	Voice
2014	M.O.N.E.Y	Frankie	
2015	Cato Street to Newgate	Judge	Voice
2015	Survivors	Dr. Williams	
2016	The Dependents	The Harvester	Short
2016	R.U.I.	Newsreader / RUI Baby Boy	
2017	Finding Fatimah	Additional Voices	
2018	King of Thieves	Security Operative	scenes deleted
2018	Rob & Beth	Rob	Short
2019	Dovetail	Harry	
2019	Criminal Audition	William	
2021	The Southampton DNA: The New 21/22 Kit	Scientist	Short
2022	The People We Hate at the Wedding	Rich Setting Candles	
2024	Bad Tidings	Euan	

=== Television ===
Year	Title	Role	Notes
2010-2011	Lee Nelson's Well Good Show	Telegraph Reporter / Reporter / General Medical Council Member	3 episodes
2011	Losing the Plot	Redders	TV movie
2012-2013	All in the Method	Rich / Voiceover / Speaking clock / Pablo	5 episodes
2012	Alan Carr's Summertime Specstacular 2	Runner	
2012	Muzzle the Pig Presents...	Rupert Marigolds / Billy	2 episodes
2012	Alan Carr's New Year Specstacular	Rich - Paramedic	
2013-2014	The Kaile & Keeble/Keeble & Kaile Show		4 episodes
2013	Fool Britannia	Hannibal Lecter / Chugger / Riot Policeman	2 episodes
2013	Hunka Wunda	Narrator / Joshua / Doctor	3 episodes
2014	Birds of a Feather	Bookshop Manager	Episode: "Gimme Shelter"
2014	Against the Clock	Rob	2 episodes
2014	The Feeling Nuts Comedy Night	Man accosted by Angelos Epithemiou	
2014	Alan Carr's New Year Specstacular	Officer Steve	
2015-2016	Rich Keeble Vanity Project	Rich Keeble	13 episodes
2015	The Delivery Man	Photographer	Episode: "Celebrity"
2015	Rules of Life	Stan	5 episodes
2015	Alan Carr's New Year Specstacular	Nicole's Date	
2016	Animal Antics	Himself	13 episodes
2016	The Unusual Suspects	Police Chief / Voiceover	4 episodes
2016	Drek Steele: Space Pirate	Drek Steele / Ship computer	Voice
2016	Sam Delaney's News Thing	Simon	1 episode
2017	Bad Snappers	Vicar	2 episodes
2017	The Last Leg	Archaeologist / Terrence Penfence - Journalist	2 episodes
2017	Last Leg: The Correspondents	Hand Sanitiser Man	Episode: "Sanitising Period Poverty"
2017	The Rebel	Ticket Inspector	Episode: "Death"
2018	Tits Up	Business Man	Episode: "A Problem"
2018	Ant & Dec's Saturday Night Takeaway	Driving Examiner	1 episode
2018	Joe Lycett's Got Your Back	Phil - Satanist	Episode: "Non-TX pilot"
2018	100mph Tales	Narrator / Various	Voice. 6 episodes
2018	Inside No. 9	Radio DJ	Voice. Episode: "Dead Line"
2018	Through the Keyhole	Richard the Lawyer	Episode: "Through the Christmas Keyhole"
2019	Porters	PC Mortimer	Episode: "Halloween"
2019	Warren	Shop Assistant / Taxi Operator / Radio Presenter	2 episodes
2019	Doctors	Mark 'Masculus' Waddington	1 episode
2020	The Trouble with Maggie Cole	Radio DJ / Telephone caller	Voice. 2 episodes
2020	In the Long Run	Parent	1 episode
2020	The Duchess	Ted	1 episode (scene deleted)
2020	Rich Keeble Zoom Chats	Rich Keeble	3 episodes
2020-21	The Emily Atack Show	Various	5 episodes
2021	Goldie's Oldies	Celebrity Shark Bait Announcer / Tim	2 episodes
2021	Ted Lasso	Clive Winkleman	Episode "Rainbow"
2022	Bloods	Paramedic	1 episode
2022	Here We Go	Dog owner	1 episode
2022	Red Flag	Ritchie Porter	Channel 4 Blap
2022	Trying	Jared	1 episode
2022	Ghosts	Toby	Episode "Gone Gone"
2022	Murder, They Hope	Priest	Episode "A Midsummer Night's Scream"
2022	It's What She Would Have Wanted	Gary	
2022-23	Not Going Out	Tom Taylor / Matthew / Unknown Caller	3 episodes
2023	Stonehouse	Producer	1 episode
2023	The Beaker Girls	Scott	Episode "The Last Straw"
2023-26	Good Omens	Mr Arnold	2 episodes
2023-25	The Change	Trevor	4 episodes
2024	Truelove	Estate Agent	1 episode
2024	Meet the Richardsons	Rich - Jon's Dentist	2 episodes
2024	Kaos	Man in Booth	2 episodes
2024-present	Rivals	Brian Hetherington	Series regular
2025	Casualty	Bruce Pope	Episode "For the Record"

=== Video games ===
Year	Title	Role	Notes
2015	Elite Dangerous: Horizons	Anarchic Flight Control / USA Crew / Audio Logs	
2016	Eve: Valkyrie	US Captain / Pilots / Crew	
2017	Total War: Warhammer	Ungrol Stoneheart	Call of the Beastmen DLC
2017	Crimson Saga: Dragonore		
2018	Battle Boom	Various	
2018	Warhammer: Vermintide 2	The Blightreaper	Shadows Over Bögenhafen DLC
2018	League of Angels III	King of Darkness / Lightning Ghost / Blood Prince	
2018	Strange Brigade	Frank Fairburne	
2019	Ancestors Legacy	Crusader Knight / Crusader Sergeant / Spy / Hassassin / Balian	Saladin's Conquest DLC
2019	Astrologaster	Robert Devereux	
2019	War Song	Horton / Gatlin / Bangar / Robin	English version
2019	Don't Even Think	DET-i CEO	
2019	Rise of Kingdoms	Julius Caesar	English version
2019	Game of Survival		
2020	Warhammer: Vermintide 2	Nurgloth The Eternal	
2020	Old Gods Rising	Professor Martin Lewis	
2020	Spellforce 3: Fallen God	The Fial Darg	
2021	Dead Man's Phone	Home Secretary	
2021	Coffin Valley	Judge / Priest / Brute	
2021	Georgiana Bones and the Hapless Heist	Narrator / The Guardian	
2021	Devil May Cry: Peak of Combat	Griffon / Phantom / Lucifer	English version
2022	Total War: Warhammer III	Bloodthirster	
2023	The Lord of the Rings: Gollum	The Mouth of Sauron	
2024	New World: Aeternum	Marcel Dupont	
2025	Wuthering Waves	Fenrico	Version 2.0
2025	Split Fiction	Board Member / Additional Voices	
2025	Clair Obscur: Expedition 33	Monoco / François / Mask Keeper / Simon / Additional Voices	
2025	King of Meat	Keith Vertex	
2025	Duet Night Abyss	Avar / Clive / Urien	
2026	Cairn	The crystal-cutter	
2026	Marathon	UESC Captain Orion	
2026	Mouse: P.I. for Hire	Crooked Cop / MPD Lieutenant / MPD Officer / Old Jonah / Steamboat Bouncer / Undercover Agent / Ze Scientist	
2026	Lego Batman: Legacy of the Dark Knight	Two-Face / Harvey Dent / Deathstroke	
2026	Warhammer 40,000: Mechanicus II	Rho / Hehki	
TBA	Titan Quest II	Pan	
TBA	Emberville	Unannounced role	In production

== Discography ==
- Rich Keeble & The More Accomplished Musicians (2017)
- In The Bath (2018)
- Lazy (2018)
- I Hope Every Special Day You Have Is Ruined in Some Way (2020)

== Awards and nominations ==
Year	Award	Category	Nominated work	Result	Ref.
2016	24th Raindance Film Festival	Best UK Web Series	Rich Keeble Vanity Project	Nominated	
2016	24th Raindance Film Festival	Best Writing (Web Series)	Rich Keeble Vanity Project	Nominated	
2016	UK Web Fest	Best UK Series	Rich Keeble Vanity Project	Won	
2017	Pilot Light TV Festival	Best British Web Series	Rich Keeble Vanity Project	Won	
2021	26th Audie Awards	Audie Award for Mystery	The Guest List (by Lucy Foley)	Nominated	
2026	31st Audie Awards	Audie Award for Romance	Looking for Group (by Alexis Hall)	Nominated	
2026	22nd British Academy Games Awards	Performer in a Supporting Role	Clair Obscur: Expedition 33	Longlisted	
2026	24th Game Audio Network Guild Awards	Best Ensemble Cast Performance	Clair Obscur: Expedition 33	Won	
