= Health in the Gambia =

With an estimated population of about 2.8 million and around 30% of the Gambia’s population lives below the international poverty line of $1.25 USD per day, with only 1.52% of its GDP on health in 2022 (WHO recommended budget for health is 5% of the GDP) The Gambia has made significant strides in the health of its people though it is still lagging in certain health targets with new emerging threats rising. The life expectancy at birth of the general population has improved from 31.2 years in 1950, to 65.9 years 2023 (average life expectancy in the world was 73.3 years in 2023) with average life expectancy as of 2023 being 64.2 years in men, and 67.5 years in women. This has been largely attributed to improvement in healthcare delivery, disease prevention and healthcare promotion programs.

The Human Rights Measurement Initiative finds that Gambia is fulfilling 63.7% of what it should be fulfilling for the right to health based on its level of income. When looking at the right to health with respect to children, Gambia achieves 93.9% of what is expected based on its current income. In regards to the right to health amongst the adult population, the country achieves only 83.4% of what is expected based on the nation's level of income. Gambia falls into the "very bad" category when evaluating the right to reproductive health because the nation is fulfilling only 13.8% of what the nation is expected to achieve based on the resources (income) it has available.

== Healthcare structure ==
There are 4 referral hospitals operated by the government: The Edward Francis Small Teaching Hospital in Banjul and smaller hospitals at Bansang, Farafenni and Bwiam. There are 8 main health centres and a further 16 smaller centres.

A group called Power Up Gambia operates in the Gambia to provide solar power technology to health care facilities, ensuring greater access to electricity.

Recently, Riders for Health, an international aid group focused on sub-Saharan countries in Africa, was noted for providing enough health-care vehicles for the entire country. Riders for Health manage and maintain vehicles for the government. The initiative addresses a major barrier to universal health care—transport—and allows health workers to visit three times as many villages every week.

== Health trends and current health issues ==
Even with the rise of Non communicable Diseases (NCDs) as leading causes of morbidity and mortality; communicable diseases, maternal and neonatal conditions remain the predominant contributors of morbidity and mortality in the Gambia. Table 1 below shows a comparison of the top 10 causes of morbidity and mortality in the Gambia as measured in disability adjusted life years

Table 1:Comparison of the top 10 causes of morbidity and mortality in the Gambia as measured in disability adjusted life years
Rank	1991	2021
1	Maternal and neonatal conditions	Maternal and neonatal conditions
2	Respiratory infections and TB	Respiratory infections and TB
3	Enteric infections	Cardiovascular diseases
4	Other infectious diseases	HIV/AIDS and other STIs
5	Neglected tropical diseases and malaria	Other non-communicable diseases
6	Other non-communicable diseases	Enteric infections
7	Nutrition deficiencies	Mental disorders
8	Cardiovascular diseases	Neglected Tropical diseases and malaria
9	Unintentional injuries	Nutrition deficiencies
10	Mental disorders	Unintentional injuries

== Maternal and child health ==
Although the maternal mortality ratio have reduced over the years from 632 per 100,000 live births in 2010, to 352 per 100,000 live births in 2023, the country is still far from achieving the SDG 3.1 target of reducing the global maternal mortality ratio to less than 70 deaths per 100,000 live births by 2030. In addition, neonatal mortality rate reduced from 3.3% in 2010 to 2.3% as of 2023, under-5 child mortality rate from 7.3% in 2010 to 4.4% in 2023. According to UNICEF, above estimates are primarily brought about by a weak health sector, due to insufficient financial and logistical support, a deteriorating physical infrastructure, lack of supplies and equipment, shortages of adequately and appropriately trained health personnel, high attrition rates, and an inadequate referral system. In Gambia, the number of midwives per 1,000 live births is five and the lifetime risk of death for pregnant women is one in 49.

== Vaccination ==
In October 2012, it was reported that the Gambia had made significant improvements in polio, measles immunisation, and the PCV-7 vaccine.

The Gambia was certified as polio-free in 2004. "The Gambia EPI program is one of the best in the World Health Organization African Region," Thomas Sukwa, a representative of the WHO, said, according to the Foroyaa newspaper. "It is indeed gratifying to note that the government of the Gambia remains committed to the global polio eradication initiative."

According to Vaccine News Daily:

- The Gambia is tied for third place in Africa for measles immunisation among one-year-old children.
- The Gambia is tied for fourth place in the world for the DTP3 immunisation for one-year-old children.
- The Gambia is ranked second in Africa for "feverish children under the age of five who received antimalarial treatment, according to Trading Economics."

== Female genital mutilation ==
According to the World Health Organization in 2005, an estimated 78.3% of Gambian girls and women have suffered female genital mutilation.

== HIV/AIDS ==
In conjunction with UNAIDS, the Gambia has made significant strides in promoting HIV/AIDS prevention, treatment and care with HIV incidence rates reducing from 1.66 per 1000, to 0.46 per 1000. This has been through programs like the Education Plus Initiative, global fund grants among others. However, the country is still far from achieving the 95-95-95 targets with only 64% of those living with HIV estimated to know their status, 70% of people living with HIV estimated to be on ART (antiretroviral treatment), and 79% of those on ART being virally suppressed. AIDS mortality is still high with only a slight reduction from 0.77 in 2000, to 0.43 in 2024.

== Nutrition status ==
According to the Global Nutrition report, The Gambia is on target to achieve one of the global nutrition targets of reducing anaemia among women of reproductive age by 50% whereby in 2019, it is estimated that only 49.5% of women of reproductive age were affected by anaemia. However, the estimate of stunting in children as of 2020 was 17.5%, 5.1% of children were wasted as of 2020, and about 53.6% of infants were exclusively breastfed in the first 6 months as of 2020. The number of overweight children also rose to 2.1% in 2020 as opposed to 1.2% in 2019. The proportion of adults with obesity is increasing with estimates of 14.8% in adult females, 5.6% in adult males, with the proportions expected to rise.

== Potential future impact of climate change on health ==
According to the Climate Finance Vulnerability Index, The Gambia ranks 173rd out of 188 in countries with the propensity to adapt to the impact of climate change with a climate risk of 84.3 and climate change financial vulnerability risk of 66.5. According to the IMF, the country is currently more prone to flooding, storms, drought, and economic loss from crop failures. In the domain of health, The Gambia is at risk of a surge in vector borne diseases, malnutrition, extreme heat effects, displacement and migration due to climate disasters, and a strain on health infrastructure.
