= Granado Espada =

2006 video game

- Developers: IMC Games Co., Ltd.
- Publishers: KOR: HanbitSoft; SEA/NA/EU: IMC Games
- Engine: PathEngine; Tree Rendering - SpeedTree; Animation - EmotionFX
- Platform: Microsoft Windows
- Release: KOR: February 14, 2006; SEA: October 24th, 2017; NA: May 16th, 2018; EU: June 3rd, 2020
- Genre: Fantasy MMORPG
- Mode: Multiplayer

Granado Espada is a Korean fantasy MMORPG developed by IMC Games Co., Ltd. The game was released in February 2006 in South Korea, and English localizations were launched in the summer of 2007 in North America and Southeast Asia. Granado Espada won the 2006 Korean Presidential Award for Best Graphics and Game of the Year with features previously unseen in MMORPGs, such as the possibility to control multiple characters at once. Granado Espada features an art style based on the Baroque period of Europe, contrary to its genre's ubiquitous sword and sorcery aesthetics.

== Setting ==
The world of Granado Espada takes place on a newly discovered continent based on the Americas during the Age of Exploration. The world is divided into different maps and grouped into themed regions such as forests, tropical jungles, plains, swamps, deserts and ice fields.

The continent, currently under the control of the fictional Kingdom of Vespanola as a colony, is in a crisis due to negligence by the home nation due to a war in the Old World. On the continent itself, internal strife has arisen from the feud between the Royalists supporting the Vespanolan crown, and the Republicans campaigning for independence. Therefore, the Vespanolan Queen has ordered a policy of Reconquista for the continent by attracting more people from the Old World to settle there. The player takes the role of a pioneering family from the Old World, eager to explore the continent and eliminate elements that will threaten the survival of its people.

== Game features ==
=== Multiple character control ===
A three-character team (fighter, elementalist, scout) using the MCC System

Granado Espada distinguishes itself from many modern-day MMORPGs with a Multiple Character Control (MCC) system. Rather than playing one character at a time, or using multiple clients, a player may control a party of up to three characters simultaneously. This aspect of the game gives it more of the feel of traditional, non-networked role-playing video games. Up to three characters can be selected to be part of a team in the Barracks Mode or Quarters. Any member of the party can be selected to be part of a team, regardless of differences in levels or classes.

=== Areas and quests ===
Dungeons in Granado Espada are interspersed between towns and generally composed of three to five levels with successively more difficult mobs. Boxes and barrels are a unique feature of dungeons - and part of the anti-AFK features of the game. They randomly spawn throughout the dungeon, and if destroyed they release a group of monsters to attack the players.

The final levels of the first two dungeons - Al Quelt Moreza and the Tetra Ruins - end with a main quest storyline Mission Room for a single player, or a room in which a boss mob may be challenged by teams of players. Missions are instances, wherein players get their own "instance" of a specific map just for themselves. Thus there can be several players attempting to kill a boss in a dungeon, each within their own instances.

There are Waypoints or (player chosen) save locations that players may teleport to by using a warp scroll. Five locations may be saved initially. Up to five more waypoint locations may be purchased from the Cash Shop (Bazaar).

Teleporters or Warps also exist to teleport players to fixed areas in the game using an item called the Teleport/Warp scroll. A new player is able to visit the three main towns (Reboldeaux, Port of Coimbra and Auch) from the beginning, and is not required to conduct exploration trips to find them. Both zone maps and a global map is provided to help players navigate through the game.

Quests are an important part of the game, though the quantity and quality varies at different levels. They provide some rewards such as "Vis" (the game's currency), experience cards, Glaziums (polishers), equipments or recruitable NPCs cards. Various NPCs throughout the towns and in some dungeon locations may be approached to initiate quests, which, like in traditional MMORPG format, usually consist of killing a number of monsters and/or obtaining their drops. With the release of Pioneering quests, players are able to delve into the story revolving around Granado Espada and its colonial power, Vespanola, in addition to the various factions on the continent itself, allowing new players to build on their quests bit-by-bit.

Granado Espada has a main quest line that extends to the highest levels and zones: the Frozen Fields of the north, Errac (Zeia), the mysterious southwestern region of Castilla, as well as the isolated isle of Viron (Byron). Access to the high-level end game raids such as the Ice Wizard's Tower, Mufasa of the Occulta Fortress, Tower of Chaos in Castilla in addition to Lucifer Castle can only be gained by completing the main pioneering quest line and other prerequisite quests.

Shiny crystals are a new addition to the game since V5.0. These crystals are common drops from lower level mobs and can be turned in for pioneer weapons and armors designed to help a pre-veteran character gain levels more easily. In addition, all pioneer equipments at levels 1, 20, 40 and 60 have the base stats of items 20 levels higher, while level 80 pioneer equipments have the same stats as a normal level 96 equipment (currently removed).

=== Dueling, Player vs. Player & Baron Mode ===
Granado Espada has a Dueling System by which a player may issue a challenge to another player's team. Both teams then enter a combat arena separate from the rest of the actual game world to do battle. This feature is available by clicking on the other family's name for a duel and also available at PvP officers in the Major cities (Reboldoeux, Coimbra, Auch) where four types of battles are available.

Another method for PvP is through the Baron system. In Player-kill (PK) servers, players are able to forcibly attack another player without their consent, and in the process become a baron as a penalty like dropping their items in inventory from baron level 1 to 4, while at level 5 baron they would start to drop their equipped item. Barons are not able to speak with NPCs and are treated as mobs while on the field. Being in baron mode also allows player access to Los Toldos, a hideout for barons, and to get the opportunity to complete quests within there. To remove the Baron mode, players must kill mobs that enable them to decrease their Baron points. Once they reach zero, the player will be able to get out of Baron mode.

In the past, players would only be able to PvP with those playing in the same server. With the introduction of the Cross-World PvP system in Version 5.0, players from different servers are able to duel each other in individual or team modes. The individual or team which wins at least three rounds will be declared the winner. Points are acquired or deducted based on the number of matches the player wins or loses. Additional benefits including experience points and purchase points for the Cross-World PvP shop are also awarded to players regardless of whether they win or lose. To encourage participation, there is also a ladder system in which players are ranked according to the points they receive through winning or losing matches.

== Characters ==
Initially, players are able to create their own family from five stock models, namely - the Fighter, Musketeer, Wizard, Scout, and Elementalist. As the player progresses through the game, NPC characters can be recruited into the player's family. The said characters' fighting abilities can be customized through learning and developing various fighting stances, in addition to equipping them with various armors and accessories with different options. Costumes also play a large role in the customization process, and many have been developed for both the stock characters and RNPCs.

=== Barracks system ===
All characters are assumed to be from the same family. They all share the same family surname that is used to identify a player in game. Characters are generated and maintained within a Barracks System. It allows players to see all of their active characters, and use the "Dressing Room" to create new characters if space permits. Each individual barrack may hold up to nine characters. Each country's version of Granado Espada provides a different number of initial starting slots with a new account. Using in-game money or the cash shop, users can expand their slots. Every ninth slot automatically opens a new barrack. Therefore, if the player has 20 slots, barracks one and two are full and the player has two characters in the third.

Based on the Korean regional server version, there are currently a maximum of twelve barracks (108 characters) per account.

=== Trading characters ===
Granado Espada allows the trading of RNPC (Recruitable NPCs) or UPC (Unique Playable Character) cards between different players, allowing combinations of teams with more than one of the same RNPC, as a player may only obtain a particular RNPC card once. The card is used up once the RNPC is created in the Barracks.

Some RNPCs may only be purchased by using items from the Cash Shop (Bazaar). Soso (Feng Ling), Baek-Ho (Baihu), Angie, Kurt and Eduardo (Edward) are examples of this class of RNPCs (No longer pay in cash shop). Their cards are not tradeable. Instead, one must purchase a Mercenary card from the Cash Shop (Bazaar). Using the said Mercenary License card, the RNPC is "Merced" and can then be traded.

Premium RNPCs, for example, Emilia the Sage, can be obtained by the code provided in the Granado Espada Limited Signature Edition Box Set. Depending on which regional server the player is on, other RNPCs such as Panfilo the Battlecook, Idge the Battlesmith can be purchased from the Cash Shop while Ralph is only available during promotions. The Japanese server has its own unique RNPCs Mifuyu, which can only be obtained for a limited period through a quest, and Andre de Lou-Oshiba, a recent addition based on the real-life Japanese comedian. Other regional servers starting from the Korean server has since modified Mifuyu and released her as Asoka, with different stats and stances. The Japanese server has since released an alternate Asoka with a dark-colored scheme compared the original Mifuyu, who sports a red/white-color scheme.

=== Factions/Clans ===
A Family may join a faction (clan). A faction can hold up to a hundred players. When a faction feels it is powerful enough, it may challenge and attempt to complete two quests to raise its faction/clan level to 51, then 52. Upon completion of the second quest, a faction may choose to join either the Royalist or Republican Party, in which faction members gain a buff which raises their family level.

Every Saturday evening (North American time) or Sunday evening (Singapore time) these factions compete against each other in a Colony War to control the colonies located in various zones of the world map. As an incentive, factions which occupy a colony are rewarded with vis based on the number of colonies they occupy.

With the V7.0 patch, factions may join either Lealtad (Esmero) or Gleichstellung (Souveran), which are the secret militant arms of the Royalist and Republican parties respectively. Individual faction members can also join these secret societies to gain access to side-quests as well as to raise their respective factions' levels. For every five members who join their faction's affiliated secret society, the faction's level will increase by one as well as increases its members' attack damage on mobs by 2% per level gained.

In addition, players belonging to these two opposing secret societies will square off in three different zones, namely the three towns of Cite de Reboldeoux, Port of Coimbra and the City of Auch. This full-scale Alliance War is available every Saturday and lasts for 90 minutes. Opposing parties not only have to defeat enemy players, but also acquire items scattered all over the map or disarm the opposing party's leader and his/her followers to gain points to gain victory.

=== Stances, Skills & Level Promotion ===
Each class has several Stances which have varying level and equipment dependencies. Each stance's level is independent from a character's level. As the character levels a stance, they gain skill points that can be used within that stance in addition to increasing the stance's stat bonuses. A stance may have up to five different skills which are unlocked as the stance levels up. Additional generic stances may be purchased at the class Master, from Emilia for constellation expert stances, while some are rewarded via quests.

One feature of stances is that stances which have the same equipment requirements can be swapped on the fly using the F5-F8 keys (alternatively, using the number keys 4–7). The musketeer's Standing Shot and Kneeling Shot stances are examples of this, as well as the fighter's Back Guard and High Guard stances.

However, stances are limited in that only particular stances may be used with a certain equipment type, e.g., a fighter wanting to use the Roof Guard stance would have to use a Great Sword, rather than a sword and shield. A musketeer wanting to use the Flintlock stance would have to use a Rifle, rather than a pistol. A stance is usable only when it is learned; unlearned stances are greyed-out and unavailable for use.

When a new player starts out, their character starts out at Level 1, while the RNPCs he or she recruits start out at various levels. When the characters reach level 100, they are able to be promoted with the use of 25 Shiny Crystals to become Veterans, and in the process create a new leveling system. In later updates, players gain the ability to move beyond Veteran level to become Expert (Level 110–120), Master (Level 120–130), High Master (Level 130–140) and Grandmaster (Level 140–150).

== Licensing ==
HanbitSoft, the publisher of the Granado Espada, manages the Korean and Japanese (under its subsidiary Hanbit Ubiquitous Entertainment) servers by itself while regional servers are licensed to various online game companies based in their respective regions.

=== Localization History ===
==== K2 Network ====
K2 Network announced in January 2007 that they would be bringing Granado Espada to the North American and European markets in Summer 2007 under the title of Sword of the New World. Originally released under a pay-to-play model, the game later became free-to-play on August 21, 2007. K2 Network was subsequently renamed GamersFirst and changed the name of the North American server to Sword 2.

==== T3Fun Transfer ====
On 31 October 2012, after 5 years of service, GamersFirst made a significant announcement through the Administrator 'Raiden''s topic—Sword game transfer notice—on General SNW Discussion, one of their Official Subforums. Due to the expiration of the licensing contract with IMC Games and HanbitSoft on 31 December 2012, North American operations of the game would be transferred to T3Fun—a subsidiary of the Korean publisher HanbitSoft—from 1 November 2012 to 31 December 2012. The transition only required players to 1) give their explicit consent to transfer their "S2 game data" (e.g.: User ID, Password, Email, billing & game data) from K2 Network to T3Fun, be it through the in-game Barracks or the website's newly created 'landing page', and 2) wait for the transfer's completion in January 2013. In preparation for this, GamersFirst took multiple precautions: halting new account creation on their website, ceasing Gold purchases from 1 December 2012 onward, restricting the in-game bazaar to users with existing gold, etc. One of the many consequences of this transfer was the forced merger of all users across the 3 servers onto a single one, which came with its own set of consequences. Two of which being: 1) in the case that a user had an in-game 'family' on more than 1 server, only the main (or highest level) family would transfer to T3Fun and 2) any 'family' under level 5 that didn't have Cash Shop items present was deleted. Another set of consequences revolve around the deletion of various in-game community data (e.g.: party, friend's list, colony, Squad, Secret Guard, Clans, etc.). It wasn't revealed until a week later on 7 November 2012 that "Clans will be disbanded".

===== Transfer Reception =====
The reception to this was varied. One of the very first replies, 7.5 hours later, was by the member 'exosia' in which they expressed a single statement: "**** just got real". 2 minutes later, member 'Belligero' quoted 'Katsuru''s deleted jest:

To all the winners of the Red Carpet Event:

Gratz you guys.

Rofl

— Katsuru, Sword game transfer notice, Official Subforums, General SNW Discussion

Member 'Irashiryu' stated 1 minute later, "Sad to see G1 let such a gem of a game go like this" and was immediately followed up by member 'Infina' simply replying with the captionless You Don't Say? meme of Nicolas Cage. Beyond the many positive replies directed at Administrator 'Raiden', some of the reactions give way to suspicions users had about the service ending.

Well, this was bound to happen sooner or later. Good news for us, players not so good news for G1.
It was a pleasure being under your supervision Raide :) Can't say that I'll miss anything else G1 related thou...

— Tergar, Sword game transfer notice, Official Subforums, General SNW Discussion

Quite the contrary, this is a very good thing for us. I could elaborate quite heavily on this but there is no reason for anyone to be emoing.

— Valteka, Sword game transfer notice, Official Subforums, General SNW Discussion

Remember all those people saying it was all doom and gloom and conspiracy theory....

Told ya so :troll_face:

That being said, this looks great for us

— Higherarche, Sword game transfer notice, Official Subforums, General SNW Discussion

Sometime between 10 August 2013 and 11 November 2013, after at least 30 pages of discussion, the topic (and likely the entire forum) was no longer accessible. Leaving over 13,167 topics and 168,267 replies behind.

===== T3Fun =====
On T3Fun's Portal, no later than 9 December 2012, a number of promises were made by Sword 2's new publisher. Among 3 untradable special rewards was the promise "to offer the latest update much faster from a service by the Developer, imcGAMES in partner with Hanbitsoft" and providing "more and more fun event[s]" through "various quests and events". They also redirected GamersFirst users to their own forum GE FORUM Go, which opened "on 14th November" and went from having atmost 69 users online on day-one to 87 on 28 December 2012 and then 301 on 9 January 2013 before possibly capping at 446 on 11 July 2020. The website's domain no longer belonged to T3Fun by 28 May 2022 at the very latest. Similar to GamerFirst, leaving a bare minimum of 692 topics and 4,111 posts by 655 members behind.

==== RNTS Media GmbH ====
Although GamersFirst had a functional server for the European market, publishing rights for the EU market would be transferred to RNTS Media GmbH after the expiration of the contract. RNTSgames has announced the name of the EU regional server to be Granado Espada - Resurrection.

==== IAHGames ====
On 10 August 2007, IAHGames, the company which the game is licensed to in Singapore, Malaysia, the Philippines, Vietnam as well as Australia and New Zealand, announced its business model for Granado Espada. Subsequently, they informed players that on August 30, 2007, the game would become commercial. IAHGames gave players a 90-day free trial if they achieved Level 20 by that time. New players had a free five-day trial period and after which, they are required to pay. On December 5, 2007, as with other regional servers, the game became free-to-play. On 27 April 2017, IAHGames ceased game service in SEA Server operation.

After more than three years of operation The9, licensee and operator of the mainland Chinese regional server, has announced that it would terminate Granado Espada's game service, citing the expiration of its contract with IMC Games. It has since stopped accepting new registrants from September 22, 2010, and began to wind down the regional server gradually. On the midnight of November 22, 2010, the servers officially went down. Game service in mainland China subsequently resumed in March 2011 under a new licensee. Astrum Nival, the operator of the Russian regional server, has ceased game service on November 30, 2012. This marked the first time that a Granado Espada regional server has completely ceased service without any transfer to another local operator.

EuroGameZ server shut down EU server on August 1, 2013, due to Interruption of Service. T3Fun server shut down NA server on September 16, 2021.

In January 2024, the publisher from Taiwan announced that the TW service will be discontinued and shut down by the end of February 2024 after 17 years long operation.

December 31, 2024, IMC Games Granado Espada Japan shut down.

=== Version Updates ===
The latest content theme for the Korean server is "Return to Orpesia". After defeating the evil Viscount Montoro, the player gets the opportunity to return to the old continent of Orpesia, where Bristia, the defeated enemy of Vespanola, announces the opening of a sea route to the New World, linking the midway island of Viron (Byron) to the Bristian port city of Kielce. The player then gets involved in a new main quest line and aids the Bristian Liberation Army to free their homeland from Vespanolan hegemony.

With the release of the "Return to Orpesia" expansion, version numberings have returned to 1.0, with an added "B", which either stands for "Bristia" or "Beginning" to symbolize a major milestone in the game's content and storyline. As of April 2013, the Korean, Japanese, Taiwanese, Southeast Asian and North American regional servers have upgraded to the new "Return to Orpesia" series. However, the Korean servers reverted to the original version numberings on January 9, 2013, reason being that the new "B" version series caused confusion. Thus, IMC decided to revert to the original numberings which is still used by its internal development team. Subsequent patches to other regional servers also followed suit.

The current version is Ailis Episode 2 - Dead End in Korean server

== Reception ==
Critical reaction to the North American release has been mixed. IGN's Metacritic lists an average rating for the game at 66, which is also the listed industry average for all games at the site. GameRankings has the game listed at a similar figure of 70%. GameSpot gave a rating of 4.0 (out of 10.0) citing "tedious quests and little payoff". IGN expressed similar concerns, noting the familiar grind between many other Korean MMOs. "You know, it's frustrating because as much as you want to like this game, unless Korean is your preferred flavor of MMO, you probably just won't."

X play on G4 gave it a 4 out of 5; Reviewer Adam Sessler was pleased, noting that out of all the free MMORPGs this one was worth playing, saying it was refreshing to have a setting other than a fantasy world, and citing the unique gameplay mechanic of the MCC system. PC Gamer magazine, also gave it a positive review, giving the game a 90% out of 100% rating, saying it "offered a fresh feel through small improvements and one substantial innovation" compared to other Korean MMOs.
