= Heist (video game) =

Cancelled video game

- Developer: inXile Entertainment
- Publisher: Codemasters
- Designer: Scott Crisostomo
- Engine: PathEngine
- Platforms: Microsoft Windows, PlayStation 3, Xbox 360
- Release: Cancelled
- Genre: Action-adventure
- Modes: Single-player, multiplayer

Heist (stylized as Hei$t) is a cancelled action-adventure video game that was developed by inXile Entertainment and would have been published by Codemasters for Microsoft Windows, PlayStation 3 and Xbox 360. It was to be set in San Francisco, California, c. 1969, following a group of criminals as they performed various thefts.

== Plot ==
In 1969, Johnny Sutton got out of jail where he ended up for committing a small robbery. He finds out his father has died, leaving one big job unfinished in San Francisco Mint. Since Johnny is coming from a family of prominent thieves, which led him to follow their footsteps, being behind the bars just increased his desire to become the best bank robber of all time. He decides to finish what his dad wasn't able to by putting together a crew.

== Gameplay ==
Heist was planned to be an open world action game. Every operation had to be carefully assessed from the start by consulting Uncle Sal. In such case, he would lay out the security measures, vault details, skill level needed to crack the safe and camera positions. Johnny was able to inspect the banks as a regular customer in order to get an understanding of the locations. The plan was to have six main banks with their own designs and security, with additional twenty side banks in order to have the players improve their skills. During all missions, he would be joined by Crumb, Cracker and Kid. Each of them had their own strong points: Crumb relied on power and used a shotgun, Kid was useful in the getaways, while Cracker used his safe-cracking skills.

The Shot Calling feature allowed the players to assign the crew's responsibilities, who would then perform their given roles. If the crew members thought they were more suitable elsewhere, they would notice Johnny or even decline the order for the tasks seen as impossible to complete. Besides the regular button press system for communication, Heist was also to include a voice-control option that allowed the players to give orders by using a microphone. All orders were tied to their separate commands, fully customizable at the same time. Depending on how the situation was being handled, the time limit to finish the job would change accordingly. The gameplay was designed to punish the players for their mistakes, relying on a domino effect as a consequence. If the players didn't bring together the customers and clerks, they could try to escape and set off the alarm through the front door or behind the cashier's desk. The security guards would tend to pull out their guns at any time if the player doesn't watch over them, resulting in the police being alerted by the people passing nearby and arriving as fast as possible. There was an implemented "reprimand-and-reward" system, where Johnny's interactions with other teammates would affect their future behaviors. For example, if he praised or scolded one of them for what they have done, that person would remember that and act by it next time. The notoriety that was made to that point affected how would the police try to handle the team. It could also cause the civilians to start carrying guns and turn into vigilantes.

If the team managed to leave the bank, the getaway would start immediately. The goal was to get to a safe place while driving as Kid across the streets of San Francisco and avoiding road blocks on the way. The police could have been slowed by shooting at their vehicles, or by distracting them with roadside objects. Some other groups would also try to stop the gang, each with their own methods and strengths: FBI, National Guard, vigilantes and street thugs. Every vehicle possessed an individual value for both armor and health, which was upgraded both performance wise and visually. Between the main story jobs, the players were able to complete side missions with additional gear or money as a reward, such as robbing diners or making alliances with other gangs. The allies were set to help the gang during the escape by various measures, such as stage protests or trucks blocking the way.

== Development ==
Initially, inXile had an agreement to develop an open-world project for PlayStation 3 in Unreal Engine, but they didn't know the specifications at the time, which led to performance issues related to random-access memory on the console.

With Scott Crisostomo as a lead designer, Heist was inspired by the '60s movies for the visual style, and several action movies for the overall feel, like Bullitt, Point Break and Dog Day Afternoon. The intent was to use the '60s rock and roll songs for the soundtrack. The developers used Need for Speed: Most Wanted as a reference for the car chases found in-game. The game was to be powered by PathEngine. Actor Christian Slater would have provided a voice in the game.

According to Brian Fargo, the development took a hit because of too much involvement by Codemasters.

== Release ==
Heist was announced on March 20, 2007, with a scheduled release date of Q4 2007 for Microsoft Windows, PlayStation 3 and Xbox 360. A month later, it was presented on the publisher's event Code 07 with a gameplay footage. At that point, Heist was about 30 to 35 percent complete. In December 2007, the game was pushed to Q2 2008 as a part of the Codemasters 2008 lineup's reveal. After missing out on summer 2008 release, there was little to no word about the state of the project since.

=== Cancellation ===
Codemasters announced on 28 January 2010 that the game had been cancelled. The British publisher furthered the statement by announcing it would no longer publish games developed by external studios.
