= Farthest Frontier =

Video Game

- Developer: Crate Entertainment
- Publisher: Crate Entertainment
- Engine: Unity
- Platform: Microsoft Windows
- Release: October 23, 2025
- Genres: City-building, survival
- Mode: Single-player

Farthest Frontier is a city-building game developed and published by Crate Entertainment. Released in Early access for Microsoft Windows on August 9, 2022, it tasks players with establishing, expanding, and defending a settlement in a remote wilderness.

== Gameplay ==
Farthest Frontier is a city-building and survival management simulator. Players begin with a small group of settlers and must gather raw materials, construct shelters, and establish stable food sources to survive environmental conditions.

The game features a granular farming system. Players must manage soil fertility, crop rotation, rock removal, and weed control to maintain crop yields. The economic system includes a multi-tiered production chain featuring craftable items and dozens of building types.

Players manage villager logistics by assigning professions such as farming, foraging, mining, and manufacturing. The simulation includes historical disease mechanics; players must secure clean water supplies, provide varied diets, and build medical facilities to prevent outbreaks of cholera, scurvy, dysentery, and bubonic plague. Combat mechanics require players to build walls, towers, and barracks to defend the settlement against waves of raiders and wildlife.

== Development ==
Farthest Frontier was developed by Crate Entertainment, an independent studio known for the 2016 action role-playing game Grim Dawn. The game represents a genre pivot for the studio. Crate Entertainment announced the game in early 2021 and released it into early access on Steam on August 9, 2022. Following three years of updates, the game exited early access with its 1.0 update on October 23, 2025.

== Reception ==
During its development and upon release, Farthest Frontier received positive coverage from gaming publications.

Rock Paper Shotgun highlighted the game's agricultural simulation, describing the multi-year crop rotation and soil management requirements as an "unexpected joy," though noting that the late-game town management lacked the immediate appeal of the early survival stages. PC Gamer similarly commended the complex production chains and intricate crop rotation mechanics, calling them highly satisfying despite a sluggish early game pace while waiting for town expansions. Eurogamer praised the organic and difficult nature of the initial settlement building, noting that it captured the most appealing elements of the city-builder genre. IGN commended the title's historical survival aspects and realistic food preservation mechanics, but pointed out early performance optimization issues and minor economic quirks.

The game sold over 1.2 million copies by the time of its 1.0 launch in late 2025.
