= Titan Quest: Immortal Throne =

2007 video game expansion pack

- Developer: Iron Lore Entertainment (Note: Mobile port developed by HandyGames. Console version developed by Black Forest Games.)
- Publishers: THQ (2007); THQ Nordic
- Producer: Michael Verrette
- Designer: Arthur Bruno
- Programmer: Keith Patella
- Artist: Michael Sheidow
- Writer: Dean O'Donnell
- Composer: Scott Morton
- Platforms: Windows, PlayStation 4, Xbox One, Nintendo Switch, Android, iOS
- Release: March 2, 2007: Windows; EU: March 2, 2007; NA: March 5, 2007; AU: March 8, 2007; PlayStation 4, Xbox One; WW: March 20, 2018; Nintendo Switch; WW: July 31, 2018; Android, iOS; WW: February 2, 2021
- Genre: Action role-playing
- Modes: Single-player, multiplayer

Titan Quest: Immortal Throne is a 2007 expansion pack to the action role-playing game Titan Quest (2006). Developed by Iron Lore Entertainment, it was originally published by THQ for Windows: it would be Iron Lore's last original project prior to their closure in 2008. Versions were later published by THQ Nordic for PlayStation 4, Xbox One and Nintendo Switch in 2018; and iOS and Android in 2021.

Following directly on from the events of Titan Quest, Immortal Throne follows the player character as they are confronted by a new wave of monsters attacking the mortal realm from the Underworld. Gameplay is identical to that of Titan Quest, with navigation through locations around the Ancient world and action combat. For Immortal Throne, improvements were made to the inventory system and multiplayer, and a new character class was added.

Development began in July 2006 after work was completed on Titan Quest, with preparatory work beginning prior to this. Staff members returned while assuming different roles to the original game: Michael Verrette produced, Michael Sheidow acted as art director, the script was written by Dean O'Donnell, while Arthur Bruno took over as main designer. Scott Morton returned to compose new tracks. The concept was to both expand upon the narrative of Titan Quest and improve the gameplay experience. It also went for a darker aesthetic compared to the original. Announced in November 2006, it released to a positive critical reception and favorable sales.

== Gameplay ==
Gameplay from Titan Quest: Immortal Throne, which is near-identical to its predecessor. Shown is the player character (centre) using a skill on surrounding enemies from the new "Dream Master" ability.

Like its predecessor Titan Quest, Immortal Throne is an action role-playing game where the player-created character navigates environments within the Ancient World: in Immortal Throne, the player begins by exploring locations like Rhodes and Epirus, before entering the Underworld and passing through supernatural locations such as the Styx and Elysium. Players progress through the story and different locations by completing quests from non-playable characters (NPCs) for various rewards, including money and experience points.

Combat happens in real-time, featuring a hack and slash style where the player character attacks enemies highlighted with the mouse. As the character gains experience levels through completing quests and killing enemies, they can access Mastery skill trees linked to different combat styles, similar to a character class system: players can have access to a primary and secondary skill tree, which grand either passive or active boons upon characters. Items and equipment, which include new armor and weapons alongside healing potions, are acquired from defeated enemies or purchased from merchants. Players of the original Titan Quest can import their current selected character into Immortal Throne, while new players must complete the main campaign before accessing Immortal Throne.

Immortal Throne features multiple additions and alterations over Titan Quest. The main addition is a new Mastery titled Dream Mastery: available to new players from the start of the main campaign, it is a magic-focused skill that relies on illusion and stasis effects to disrupt enemy groups. Among the abilities available are putting nearby enemies to sleep until they are hit by a weapon strike, turning enemies on each other, and effects which make enemies take damage when they strike the player or faster health and energy recovery. In addition to extra quests, new items and equipment are included. An additional item slot for the player character is reserved for Artifacts, charms crafted for the player by Enchanters after the player discovers enough Arcane Formulae after defeating enemies. Artifacts are divided into three levels (Lesser, Greater and Divine), which grant a variety of status effects depending on their level. A separate type of item are Scrolls, expendable items that produce powerful effects and can be equipped in a similar fashion to healing potions. Additional sellers and storage Caravans are included in between towns. Multiplayer functions return from the original game, while adding refinements such as the ability to automatically join parties and engage in player-versus-player matches.

== Plot ==
Immortal Throne picks up immediately after the events of the main game: after the titan Typhon has been defeated, the Olympian gods hail the player character as humanity's hero, and decide that the human world can function without their protection. The player is transported to Rhodes, where a new wave of monsters has appeared: this is blamed by Tiresias on the player's activities creating strife in the Underworld, the source of the monsters. To discover the reason behind the attacks, the player must seek out the sorceress Medea, who sends the player to a region near the Pindos Mountains. Following a path into them, the player finds the path into the Underworld, where the dead are trapped in limbo due to the Judges of the Underworld no longer passing sentence on them. After the player defeats Charon and Cerberus, who have abandoned their original purposes, they head through Elysium. The player learns that Hades, god of the Underworld, is launching an attack on the living world now that the more powerful Olympians have left humanity unprotected. After trapping Hades' army in the Underworld, the player then defeats Hades himself. Persephone then appears, dubs the player "Godsbane" and declares that humans have earned the right to control both life and death.

== Development and release ==
Development on Immortal Throne began in early June 2006, a few weeks after the original Titan Quest went gold. Preparatory work was in progress during the late development stages of Titan Quest, with staff drawing up feature lists and choosing what features to improve and what additions to make. According to producer Michael Verrette, Immortal Throne was considered an extension of Titan Quest, as many of the elements it included were features that could not be included in the original game due to time constraints. Multiple staff from Titan Quest returned, either in their original roles or different roles: Verrette became producer after being a sound designer for the original game, Arthur Bruno became lead gameplay designer, and Michael Sheidow and Scott Morton returned as art director and composer respectively. The original graphics engine was carried over from the original game with some accompanying refinements. The level design was based around the increased vertical elements in environments, giving a wider variety of gameplay spaces and vistas. A big addition to the game was the Dream Mastery character class, which was both designed to fit in among the existing character classes and to be a useful skill in cooperative multiplayer. The level editor, a feature present in the original game, was left mostly intact, although additional development features were added such as lockable day and night cycle and preview features for new elements. Visually, the game was themed around a descent into the Underworld: the deeper the player went on their journey, the darker the environments became. Immortal Throne would be the last original property worked on by Iron Lore Entertainment: after completing work on Soulstorm, an expansion to Warhammer 40,000: Dawn of War, the studio was forced to close in February 2008 due to difficulties in securing any funding for future projects.

The game's story was born from wanting to expand upon the original game's theme of the growing rift between mankind and the gods. The Greek Underworld was the one major mythical location that the developers of Titan Quest had not yet approached. As it offered a rich source of material for their creative staff, it was made the location for the expansion. The story concept the team began with was the possibility of a secondary hostile force besides the Titans that had only kept away from humans due to the presence of the Olympians, and now rose up as they retreated from human affairs. With the quests, the team worked to improve on the structure and impact they had in the original, introducing famous places and people from history and mythology. They also expanded the variety of side quests, and included elements such as legends and customs related to the dead. The script was written by Dean O'Donnell. While an experienced playwright, he encountered new challenges in writing for the video game medium, as he needed to always assume that the player had spoken first to a selected NPC and to contain the necessary information in the first line of dialogue with embellishment in additional lines. Aesthetically, the tone of Immortal Throne was darker than that of its predecessor, with one of the main elements of this change being the cover art: according to designer Arthur Bruno, this was in reaction to the unfavorable impression players received from the surface appearance of Titan Quest when compared to the darker take on Grecian mythology in the God of War series.

Immortal Throne was announced by publisher THQ in November 2006, four months after the release of Titan Quest. The game went gold in February 2007. It released in 2007 in Europe on March 2, North America on March 5, Australia on March 8, and in Japan on March 23. The game was released on Steam on July 17, 2007 alongside its predecessor by THQ. Immortal Throne was re-released as part of the Titan Quest gold edition: it released on October 22, 2007 in the West, and on April 25, 2008 in Japan. Since its release and the closure of Iron Lore, fan patches were created to address issues found within Immortal Throne such as bugs and multiplayer issues. The Titan Quest intellectual property was purchased by Nordic Games after THQ began selling off its shares in the wake of its 2013 bankruptcy. Beginning in 2016, Nordic Games began supporting the game's Steam version with patches to fix gameplay and multiplayer issues, along with glitches and bugs. Titan Quest was later ported to mobile devices in 2016 by DotEmu under supervision by Nordic Games: when asked whether Immortal Throne would also be released on the platforms, DotEmu stated that they were focusing on the main game and would hopefully port Immortal Throne at a later date. The Immortal Throne content was eventually included in the Legendary Edition, published on January 12, 2021. It was also included in the 2019 Anniversary Edition upgrade, and the game's console ports released in 2018; March 20 for PlayStation 4 and Xbox One, and July 31 for Nintendo Switch. The console ports were developed by Black Forest Games, while the mobile version was developed by HandyGames.

== Reception ==
Reception

Aggregate score
| Aggregator | Score |
|---|---|
| Metacritic | 80/100 (23 reviews) |

Review scores
| Publication | Score |
|---|---|
| 1Up.com | A |
| Eurogamer | 7/10 |
| Game Informer | 8/10 |
| GameSpot | 7.9/10 |
| GameSpy | 4/5 |
| IGN | 7.8/10 |
| PALGN | 8.5/10 |
| PC Gamer (UK) | 7/10 |

In its debut month, the NPD Group reported that Immortal Throne reached #13 in the dedicated PC gaming charts. According to Bruno, the combined worldwide sales of Titan Quest and Immortal Throne totaled over one million units worldwide by late 2008. It also continued to sell well on Steam, though exact figures were not given.

Titan Quest: Immortal Throne received positive reviews from professional critics upon release. Aggregate review website Metacritic assigned a score of 80/100 based on 23 reviews. 1UP.com's Jeff Green positively noted that Immortal Throne had transformed his character "from bored millionaire to desperate pauper" due to the increased amount of desirable loot and its rebalanced economy. Eurogamer's Jim Rossignol, while admitting that the expansion would not bring in new players, enjoyed the additional playtime and the improvements it made. Game Informer's Adam Biessener said that it "breathed new life" into Titan Quest while staying true to the conventions of its genre. Ryan Davis of GameSpot praised the improvements it made to the original game, but noted performance drops on computers that exceeded the game's recommended specifications.

GameSpy's Thierry Nguyen enjoyed the expansion and particularly noted the Dream Mastery's impressive ability roster compared to others in the game, but noted that it retained its formulaic structure from Titan Quest. IGN's Steve Butts said that, while it would not win new fans due to its similarity to Titan Quest, praised the new additions and tweaks while criticizing the lack of improvements made to multiplayer. PALGN's Mark Marrow was highly positive, saying that despite its flaws Immortal Throne "further cements [Titan Quest's] position as being a worthy purchase for fans of the genre". Quintin Smith, writing for PC Gamer UK, admired the effort put into the creation of the new zone and praised the gameplay additions despite elements such as the Dream Mastery not being as innovative.
