= Survivors (2015 film) =

- Directed by: Adam Spinks
- Written by: Adam Spinks; Laurence Timms
- Starring: Joanne Gale; Simon Burbage; David Anderson; Adrian Annis
- Cinematography: Daniel Gahnstrom
- Edited by: Phillip Biggs
- Music by: Buz
- Distributed by: Continuum Motion Pictures; Matriarch Multimedia Group
- Release dates: 20 October 2015 (United States); 26 October 2015 (United Kingdom)
- Running time: 92 minutes
- Country: United Kingdom
- Language: English
- Budget: £10,000

Survivors is a 2015 British horror film directed by Adam Spinks, co-written by Spinks with Laurence Timms.

== Premise ==
The film follows journalist Kate Meadows (Joanne Gale) and her cameraman Duke (Simon Burbage) as they embark on a mission to uncover whether or not a government weapons contractor has secretly been using humans as their test subjects.

== Main cast ==
- Joanne Gale as Kate Meadows
- Simon Burbage as Duke Wilcott
- David Anderson as Paul
- Adrian Annis as Alan
- Vanessa Mayfield as Louise Whelan
- Lydia Kay as Security Guard
- Rich Keeble as Dr. Williams

== Production ==
The film was made on a budget of £10,000 and was crowdfunded. Initial filming began in 2012, with additional pick ups in 2014. In between filming blocks, Spinks shot the feature film Extinction.

== Release and reception ==
Survivors was released in the UK on 26 October 2015 on DVD and on VOD, having been made available in the US, Canada and Mexico a week earlier on 20 October.

Critical reaction to the film was generally positive. James Simpson of Infernal Cinema described the film as "a superb British horror". Elliott Maguire of UK Horror Scene praised the actors, particularly Burbage, as well as the visual effects and sound design, but was critical about the pacing of the film. Trilbee commented on a number of production deficiencies but was again complimentary about the acting quality, in particular that of Gale, concluding that the film "does something rather unique in the low-budget scene in that it brings the subgenre back to what made it so relevant and popular in the first place; that it’s not about the zombies or the make-up, it’s about the people."

The film won "best director" at the Mac Horror Film Festival 2015.
