= All in the Method =

- Genre: Comedy
- Created by: Luke Kaile; Rich Keeble
- Starring: Luke Kaile; Rich Keeble
- Country of origin: United Kingdom
- Original language: English
- No. of seasons: 1
- No. of episodes: 5

Production
- Producers: Luke Kaile; Rich Keeble
- Production locations: London, United Kingdom
- Running time: 10 minutes

Original release
- Network: YouTube
- Release: 17 June 2012 – 22 June 2013

All in the Method is a British comedy web series produced, written by and starring Luke Kaile and Rich Keeble. The series is broadcast on the internet and premiered on 17 June 2012. So far, five episodes of season one have been made. The show can be found distributed on the web via YouTube. The series sees Rich and Luke as flat-sharing brothers who have both chosen the poorly paid profession of acting as their chosen career paths. Both of them believe in the ‘method’ form of acting, where they become their character twenty-four-seven. This naturally results in the pair getting themselves into scenarios that their everyday lives would never have come close to brushing with if it wasn't for their commitment to the acting cause.

Both Keeble and Kaile's experiences as actors and writers helped prepare them for producing All in the Method in many ways, despite never having produced a web series before. The cast includes many people they've worked with on past projects, both in the theatre and in film, and many of the characters are inspired by those past experiences. All in the Method was screened at the Raindance Film Festival and won 'Best Guest Actor' (Peter Glover) at LA Web Fest 2014.
