= Titan Quest =

2006 action role playing hack and slash video game

- Developer: Iron Lore Entertainment (Note: Additional work by Demiurge Studios. Mobile port developed by DotEmu, later development by HandyGames. Post-2017 expansions developed by Pieces Interactive and Digital Arrow. Console version developed by Black Forest Games.)
- Publishers: THQ (2006); THQ Nordic
- Producer: Jeff Goodsill
- Designer: Brian Sullivan
- Programmer: Max McGuire
- Artists: Michael Sheidow; Rich Sullivan; Josh McHugh
- Writer: Randall Wallace
- Composers: Scott Morton; Michael Verrette
- Platforms: Windows, iOS, Android, Nintendo Switch, PlayStation 4, Xbox One
- Release: Windows; NA: June 26, 2006; EU: June 30, 2006; iOS; May 19, 2016; Android; July 7, 2016; PlayStation 4, Xbox One; March 20, 2018; Nintendo Switch; July 31, 2018
- Genre: Action role-playing
- Modes: Single-player, multiplayer

Titan Quest is a 2006 action role-playing game developed by Iron Lore Entertainment and published by THQ for Windows, first physically and then in 2007 through Steam. A mobile port was developed by DotEmu and published in 2016, and versions for PlayStation 4, Xbox One and Nintendo Switch were released in 2018. All these versions were published by THQ Nordic. The story follows a player-created protagonist as they navigate Ancient Greece, Egypt and China on a quest to defeat the Titans after they escape from their ancient prison. The gameplay is similar to the Diablo series, with player navigation being handled with a mouse-driven tile-based interface, and gameplay revolving around role-playing mechanics and real-time combat. Four expansions have been created for the game; Titan Quest: Immortal Throne in 2007, and three others between 2017 and 2021.

Titan Quest was envisioned by game designer Brian Sullivan as a role-playing game set in Ancient Greece similar to Age of Mythology. Production began in 2004 after a successful pitch to THQ. The script was written by Randall Wallace, while Sullivan acted as the designer. Despite being in a mythical setting, the team wanted to make the environments and towns feel as realistic as possible, leading to a large amount of research into ancient cultures. Enemies were inspired by the game's regional mythologies, with designs inspired by the stop-motion work of Ray Harryhausen. The music, composed by Scott Morton and Michael Verrette, was created to avoid the looping tracks of other games.

First announced in 2005, Titan Quest received generally positive reviews when released, being both praised as a good example of the genre while at the same time being criticized for its traditional gameplay. Sales of the main game and its expansion have been estimated as approaching one million units. The mobile port was tricky for its developers due to adapting the game for touchscreen controls: like the console version, it received positive reviews upon release. The engine and gameplay of Titan Quest later became the foundation for Grim Dawn, a video game developed by team members from Iron Lore following the studio's closure.

A sequel, titled Titan Quest II, is set to be released in January 2027.

== Gameplay ==
Gameplay for Titan Quest: shown are the UI, and combat between the protagonist and multiple enemies in an Egyptian environment: the attacks use magical powers linked to the "Storm" Mastery.

Titan Quest is an action role-playing game set in the pre-Roman Ancient World: these include Ancient Greece, Egypt, and the Silk Road leading through Asia. Players take control of an avatar: players are able to choose gender, name and tunic color. The three-dimensional world is navigated through an overhead third-person view, with the player character being controlled with the mouse through a point-and-click interface, while abilities are mapped to keyboard buttons. The environment is obscured by a "Fog of War" effect which blacks out unexplored environments on the minimap. Optional text tutorials for gameplay elements are unlocked progressively throughout the game and can be viewed at any time.

As they progress, players gain experience points through defeating enemies and completing quests for non-player characters (NPCs) scattered around environments: these raise a character's experience level, which grant access to fresh skills and points that can be used to upgrade character attributes such as health and energy levels, dexterity, intelligence, or strength. If the player dies, they respawn at rebirth fountains scattered through the world, although they lose some accumulated experience points. Quests are divided into Main Quests related to the central narrative, and side quests unique to particular areas of the world. Other NPCs can be found in towns and cities that act as Merchants selling equipment and items: these can be both bought and sold. Player characters have multiple equipment slots, which can take armor for limbs and torso, weapons or shields, and accessories that grant passive boons.

Fighting takes the form of real-time hack and slash combat, with players attacking randomly generated enemies highlighted by the mouse. Available weapon types for characters include swords, clubs, axes, and staves. In addition to the standard attack with an assigned weapon, offensive skills can be deployed. Using active skills triggers a cooldown meter, rendering that skill unusable until the meter depletes. Items and equipment can also be looted from fallen enemies and chests scattered through environments: these range in quality, with grey standing for damaged or low-quality gear while purple stands for a "Legendary" item, and orange denotes a Relic or Charm which can be equipped to the player to increase an attribute such as elemental damage resistance. The majority of items and equipment are randomly generated, and are associated with particular types of enemies. The world's currency, Gold, can be gained through quest completion, opening chests and defeating certain enemies. Gold is used with the various shop NPCs in exchange for their services.

After leveling up for the first time, the player can access Masteries, skill tree-based upgrade systems where skill points unlocked upon leveling up can be used to access and boost different skills. Mastery abilities expend energy, which is replenished over time when skills are not in use or by using energy drinks. There are eight available Masteries to choose from (Defence, Warfare, Hunting, Rogue, Earth, Storm, Nature and Spirit). Players can access two Masteries at any one time, mixing skills from both trees. The combination of different Masteries create different character classes: for instance, combining Nature and Earth Masteries grants players the "Summoner" class, while Defense and Warfare Masteries create the "Conqueror". There are 36 possible Classes, which include pure disciplines within one Mastery and hybrids between different Masteries. After a certain point in the game, the player has access to Mystics, NPCs which can reallocate skill points for a fee.

In addition to single-player, the title features cooperative multiplayer, where players can accept invitation from up to six other players to join their game session through either LAN or online connection. Alongside being able to fight enemies together, players can swap messages and exchange loot. There is also a Level Editor available, where players can access developer tools and create their own levels which can be shared with other players. The editor features a large number of options for environment customization, including adjusting the shade of environmental elements like roads.

== Synopsis ==
Titan Quest begins with a narration, detailing how the Titans once ruled the primordial darkness before the light of the Olympian Gods appeared: after a great war, the Titans were exiled and imprisoned, and the Olympians ushered in a golden age. An unknown time later, a trio of lesser Titans known as Telkines broke the conduit linking Olympus with the mortal world, and summoned armies of monsters to prepare for the release of the Titans. The player character begins their quest at the village of Helos, where beasts are destroying the local crops. Fighting their way through Greece, they learn of Telkines from a group called the Order of Prometheus. After defeating the first Telkine beneath the palace of Knossos, the player travels to Egypt and attempts to restore the connection between Earth and Olympus. The ritual fails, and they must defeat a second Telkine. The player then pursues the final Telkine along the Silk Road to China. Pursuing the Telkine to the Wusou Mountains, the player is too late to prevent the release of the Titan Typhon, who travels to Olympus to destroy the gods. After the player defeats Typhon, Zeus declares that humanity has proven itself able to live without the protection of Olympus.

Multiple expansion packs detail further adventures undertaken by the player character. In Immortal Throne, the player descends into the Underworld to confront the source of an outbreak of monster attacks. In Ragnarök, the player travels to the Norse realms, allying with the inhabitants of Asgard against an invasion by the Jotunn and the schemes of the treacherous Loki. In Atlantis, the player is called by Poseidon to help against attacks coming from the corrupted city of Atlantis. In Eternal Embers, the player travels to China and must deal with the ten sun spirits, who seek to avert their prophesied destruction and begin attacking mortals.

== Development ==
Titan Quest was the brainchild of game designer Brian Sullivan: while he was working on Age of Empires, which sported a Grecian setting, he came up with the concept of creating a similar game while including the region's mythology. The concept work for Titan Quest began in 2000, when its developer Iron Lore Entertainment was formed by Sullivan and Paul Chieffo. The two brought together a skeleton team to create a demo with which to find a publisher. During this time, the game was described by producer Jeff Goodsill as being "on the drawing board". The creative leads on the project were Sullivan, Chieffo, programmer Max McGuire, and artists Rich Sullivan and Josh McHugh. According to Sullivan, the pre-production process lasted over a year. Iron Lore's January 2004 pitch to THQ was successful, and development began once they had secured a contract in 2004. The initial staff up to that time was just nine people working in a small office area: when production started and further staff were hired, the team size grew to 38, which included temporary and late development additions. Sullivan was involved in multiple areas of the development, but his main responsibility was game design and overseeing content creation. Titan Quest was aimed at both casual and hardcore gamers, as the necessary prices for games necessitated reaching out to a wide audience to get a profit. For this reason, the team chose the action role-playing genre. Developing the game was made more difficult by the necessity to create Iron Lore around it, recruiting and training new staff. Other studios were also involved with development. Towards the end of development, Demiurge Studios was brought in to help with the final stages during the alpha-beta-ship stages. Demiurge first helped with memory optimization; then worked on the level editor and modification functions so they worked as an independent function; and finally created installers for both the demo and the main game. Demiurge's involvement gave Iron Lore more time and energy to devote to fixing bugs and polishing gameplay. The CGI opening cinematic was created by Blur Studio.

According to designer Ben Schneider, the basic story was built around the recurring motif in multiple mythologies where a younger generation of deities defeat older primal beings, with the main premise being that victory being overturned. They stayed within their mythological subject matter rather than straying into historical events: this was due to an incident during the release of Age of Empires where the developers needed to cut a scenario showing Korean people coming under attack from invading Japanese due to potential political and popular backlash in both countries. The game's story and script were written by Randall Wallace, a screenwriter who had written recent successful films Braveheart and Pearl Harbor. Titan Quest was his first time writing for a video game. Together with Iron Lore staff, Wallace created a story where humans and the Olympians faced both the Titans and the mythical beasts allied with them that had retreated to the forgotten parts of the world. According to Wallace, Iron Lore wanted story to be a priority in contrast to most other video games, with the player experience focusing on growing their character and learning the world's lore from NPCs. Speaking about his experience writing for the game compared to his work on films, he needed to work within more rigid guidelines and the need to make the story fit in with the gameplay and content. This meant that some scenarios needed to be cut either due to budget limitations or some sequences working so well that they were extended. A major change from his writing for films was that it was the side characters rather than the main character that drove the story forward, so he needed to make them entertaining and important to furthering the plot. The team wanted a world with a scope beyond the main story, with material covering all of its locations. They also included NPC storytellers that would relate local legends and myths to the player in a similar way to storytellers of the time. Later, lead gameplay designer Arthur Bruno faulted the presentation as unappealing compared to the version of Greek mythology portrayed by God of War series, saying that the original atmosphere "was seriously lacking a sense of dread and mystery".

=== Design ===
Concept art of helmet types designed by Michael Sheidow, the game's art director

The game's art director was Michael Sheidow, who had done concept work for Dungeons & Dragons Online before joining Iron Lore. Initially hired as lead artist, Sheidow was at the time feeling "burnt out" by the design approaches used for Dungeons & Dragons Online. He became art director after the then-current art director proved inadequate for the job, and after the initial shock, set to work managing the general artwork for the title. He was in charge of a 12-strong artistic team, and they needed to create a cohesive experience without a clear narrative to guide them. They also needed to account for the four months "wasted" time under the previous art director. A large amount of research went into what environments, architecture and other elements could be put into each environment so it fit in with the game's setting. Sheidow personally did several helmet designs for the game, all based on surviving examples of early-Bronze Age helmets, along with added elements from other ancient helmet types. He created a broad range of helmet shapes which could be then adjusted with different materials to create high variation. The majority of weapon design was handled by Joe Mirabello, who claimed to have created nearly 1000 different weapons split between six types.

Enemy creatures were taken from the various mythologies the team drew from, and their designs inspired by the stop-motion work of Ray Harryhausen. Sheidow valued the chance of working with mystical creatures, as his previous work had been limited to stock fantasy monsters from the Dungeons & Dragons universe. According to him, the process started when the chosen enemy monsters were given initial designs by lead concept artist Rich Sullivan. Each design was reviewed, and the most suitable was chosen. Creature designs needed to incorporate design choices from the game, such as the monsters' environments and individual fighting styles. They also needed to consider how much detail to put into character models depending on their relative position to the camera at any given time. When it reached the modelling stage, the monster designs were further refined to work within the restrictions of the game, then it was sent to the art time again for final adjustments and mapping of unique animations. The particle effects were handled by Travis Doggett: one of the more prominent pieces of his work were the mastery skills, which had particular themes related to their abilities. According to animator Brian Labore, model animation proved a taxing task, as there were over eighty different monsters which ranged from typical mythical beings to more exotic and unique enemies from each region. The player character also had "hundreds" of animations to incorporate.

The game used a specially developed proprietary engine developed by Iron Lore staff. This was done as, when development started, no third-party engines existed that could support the team's vision for the game: in Sullivan's words, there were "plenty of technology solutions for someone creating a shooter, but not as much for a role-playing game". One of the key parts of the new engine was an environmental creation tool dubbed "the editor" by staff. This tool combined a tile-based horizontal plain with a height-based map, and allowed for subtle adjustments to environments and terrain with easy-to-use developer tools. Level and plain boundaries were set using cliffs and plateaus within the environment. Objects such as chests and enemies could be then "dropped" into environments using a point-and-click system, some of which could be directly integrated using special "tile" elements which stitched into the wider environment for objects such as bridges and crags. All of this necessitated a large amount of research on multiple subjects, including the flora of Egypt and the appearance of Ancient Greek roads and paths. This development tool was the version released with the retail version so players could create and share their own levels. Level and map creation was handled by a three-person team, with each one needing to agree upon a specific layout and design before it went into full production. While early builds used a high amount of detail along level boundaries, the team switched to simple boundary designs as they "read better" for players and allowed better technical performance. The challenge the content creation team set themselves was creating these areas while making boundaries seem natural. This combination of height and grid-based navigation and environments had not been done when the system was being designed in 2002: most of the map was shaped using the height map, while specialist features and horizontal navigation used the grid. In a preview about the game, the developers said the game was built around "database driven modular proxies", a system where different elements within environments were seamlessly interacted and could interact freely. The artificial intelligence (AI) was designed so individual units would behave differently depending on situation and combat ability. The pathfinding for AI units such as NPCs and enemy units was handled using the PathEngine, a licensed middleware engine dedicated to this task. Titan Quest was one of the first major Western titles to use PathEngine.

Gameplay was compared frequently to Blizzard's Diablo series. According to Sullivan, the comparison was inevitable as Diablo helped define the genre, and was emphasized by the lack of action RPGs at the time. While the core gameplay remained traditional, they attempted to innovate in other areas. Character creation was simplified to simply choosing a name and gender rather than character types being tied to classes or chosen proficiency. They also effectively removed tutorials so players could get straight into gameplay, using games like Neverwinter Nights as an example of tutorials impeding players during early stages. When creating the skill system, the team looked at earlier successful RPGs and considered how they could improve on them. They also wanted to avoid creating characters who had "a little of everything" while offering replayability. The result was the creation of the themed masteries, with the added element of skill acquisition not being tied to level progression, allowing for players to bank skill points for different purposes. This system was built to encourage player freedom and represent logical character progression rather than tying one character to one class. Spawn points for enemies were governed by a random generation system, of what monsters are spawned depending on both environment and player level. Loot was controlled by a database system which mixed and matched characteristics to produce "over 100,000" item combinations. Loot drops were also made to fit the types of creatures killed, in contrast to other games such as World of Warcraft which had animals dropping currency and weapons regardless. Loot types were also designed to be clearly visible on enemies so players could pick and choose which enemies to engage and which defeated enemy to loot. According to Bruno, the team were limited with the amount of impact and realism they could put into combat by the necessity of keeping the game within its prescribed ESRB age ratings of "E for Everyone" and "T for Teens": this meant that blood was non-existent and hit reactions were minimal, negatively affecting player impressions of the game. Multiplayer was part of the game plan from its beginnings, with the main goal being to foster a community around the game. Bruno later faulted the lack of secure multiplayer as one of the major faults with the game: THQ apparently was unwilling to invest in this.

=== Audio ===
The music and sound design for Titan Quest was handled by Scott Morton and Mike Verrette. In his role as sound designer, Morton worked from specifications sent by other parts of the Titan Quest development team. This enabled the free modification of sound elements, but also meant that unexpected and large work loads with short deadlines were a constant possibility. The sound design process for each object and character that needed sound effects was the same: based on their appearance, a new sound effect would be created. In the case of monsters, different sound effects were created for different scenarios, such as them seeing the player for the first time or when in battle. The sounds within environments were designed to be "real" and "visceral". The game's audio engine enabled these sound effects to be dynamically shifted depending on their setting.

The music was challenging due to drawing from multiple cultures, then being brought together into a cohesive score while keeping each region distinct from the other. To get the right feeling, the team did research into the historical musical instruments used in each of the game's regions. Rather than a linear progression of looping musical tracks, the norm for most games at the time, the score was broken up into stingers that were brought into the environment when needed. This cuing of themed musical pieces was coupled with a second system tied to environmental progression: musical pieces were arranged in the playlist, then could be cued in depending on the circumstances and environment on-screen. For vocal tracks, the lyrics were written in Ancient Greek: the main vocal piece, "When Gods Fall", was infused into the other vocal tracks and acted as a "cornerstone" for the score. The vocals were provided by Taunia Soderquist.

== Release ==
Titan Quest was first announced in May 2005, with its first public exhibition being at that year's Electronic Entertainment Expo. The game released for Windows on June 26, 2006 in North America, and June 30, 2006 in Europe. According to Bruno, when originally shipped, the ESRB raised the game's rating to "M for Mature" due to the scantily-clad Nymph familiar, although the rating was later amended to its current one. In Japan, the game released on September 1, 2006: it released in English with the manual translated into Japanese. The game was released on Steam on July 17, 2007 alongside its expansion by THQ. An updated version, subtitled Gold Edition, was released on October 22, 2007 in the West and April 25, 2008 in Japan. It contained both the main game and its first expansion.

Titan Quest would be one of only three projects Iron Lore worked on in its lifetime, and the only original project alongside Immortal Throne: after completing work on Soulstorm, an expansion to Warhammer 40,000: Dawn of War, the studio was forced to close in February 2008 due to difficulties in securing any funding for future projects. Some of team founded a new studio called Crate Entertainment and licensed the Titan Quest engine to develop Grim Dawn, dubbed by staff as a spiritual successor to Titan Quest. The Titan Quest intellectual property was purchased by Nordic Games (later THQ Nordic) after THQ began selling off its shares in the wake of its 2013 bankruptcy. Beginning in 2016, Nordic Games began supporting the game's Steam version with patches to fix gameplay and multiplayer issues, along with glitches and bugs. An overhauled version of the game, subtitled Anniversary Edition, was released on August 31, 2016. Compiling all updates and expansions up to that point, it was offered as a free upgrade for players who already owned Steam versions of the game.

=== Later versions ===
A port of Titan Quest for mobile devices was developed under license from Nordic Games by DotEmu, a French developer who had previously developed a successful mobile port of Ys Chronicles I. The controls and interface were redesigned from the ground up to work for touchscreen controls, something the team spent months on. Despite the changes, the team worked to make the gameplay as close as possible to the original experience. They also put in additional options for actions such as targeting enemies with mastery abilities and searching for loot It released on May 19, 2016 for iOS. The Android version was released on July 7. Following the game's release, Dotemu handled the project to THQ Nordic, who re-published the game in 2018. It was released a third time that same year under new developer HandyGames as Titan Quest HD. An updated version subtitled Legendary Edition was released on January 12, 2021, which included all DLC and expansion packs up to that point. Titan Quest was later ported onto PlayStation 4, Xbox One, and Nintendo Switch in 2018. The PS4 and Xbox One version were released on March 20, while the Switch version was released on July 31. These console versions were created by Black Forest Games.

=== Expansions ===
Development on an expansion pack began shortly after the release of Titan Quest, with preparatory work happening during the final stages of the main game's development. The expansion, Titan Quest: Immortal Throne, was first announced in late 2006 and eventually released in March 2007. Over eleven years later, a second expansion was released. Titled Titan Quest: Ragnarök, it was released on November 17, 2017 exclusively for the Anniversary Edition. A third expansion subtitled Atlantis was released in May 2019. It included new challenge modes and an in-game casino. PS4 and Xbox One versions of both expansions were released in March 2020. Both Ragnarök and Atlantis were developed by Pieces Interactive. A fourth expansion, Eternal Embers, released in December 2021. Eternal Embers was developed by Digital Arrow.

== Reception ==
Reception

Aggregate score
Aggregator	Score
Metacritic	PC: 77/100 iOS: 80/100; PS4: 55/100; XONE: 66/100; NS: 65/100

Review scores
Publication	Score
1Up.com	B−
Eurogamer	7/10
GameSpot	7.6/10
GameSpy	3.5/5
Gamezebo	3.5/5
IGN	8.1/10
PALGN	9/10
PC Zone	8.1/10
TouchArcade	4.5/5
VideoGamer.com	8/10

On its release in the US, Titan Quest debuted at #3 in the dedicated PC game charts. In the UK, the game debuted at #25 in the multi-platform charts. In a later interview, Arthur Bruno stated that the title had sold "surprisingly well" despite a slow start, with combined sales for Titan Quest and Immortal Throne reaching over one million units by late 2008. It also continued to sell well on Steam, though exact figures were not given.

Titan Quest received positive reviews upon release: aggregate site Metacritic recorded a score of 77/100 based on 51 critic reviews. Eric Neigher of 1UP.com enjoyed Titan Quest while noting that it stayed within genre traditions: he rounded off his review by saying "While it may not break, or even dent, any new ground, Titan Quest features a beautifully realized game world based on a tried-and-true core mechanic, with tons of replayability". Jim Rossignol of Eurogamer said that, while it stood high among its contemporary peers, Titan Quest did not evolve the genre enough for him to really enjoy it. GameSpy's Miguel Lopez praised the visuals, gameplay, character customization and editing tools. His main criticisms were performance difficulties and the large potential for cheating in multiplayer. GameSpot's Ryan Davis called it "the next-best thing" to a new Diablo title, praising its single-player campaign and multiplayer while faulting its familiar feel, inventory system and recurring technical issues.

IGN's Tom McNamara generally praised the gameplay despite some awkward elements, called the sound design "well done", and positively noted its graphics despite some technical troubles. He also cited the multiplayer as the main part of the game's replay value, as it was otherwise fairly linear in design. PALGN reviewer Mark Marrow called Titan Quest "one of the best PC games on the market for the year", saying it revitalized its genre despite some minor issues with gameplay and presentation. PC Zone's Sam Kieldsen praised the gameplay and leveling system, along with its graphics and soundtrack. His main criticisms were its low difficulty, repetitive structure and weak storyline. VideoGamer.com's Tom Orry said the game "doesn't really do anything new", but praised its presentation and noted that it was more accessible than others within the genre. In his review of the mobile port, Shaun Musgrave of Touch Arcade shared many points of praise with earlier reviewers, along with calling it a good port despite some minor issues such as framerate drops. Gamezebo's Rob Rich praised the gameplay elements carried over from the original, and positively noted its graphical detail despite persistent framerate drops. His main complaints were the inventory system, and problems with contextual commands such as picking up items.

The Academy of Interactive Arts & Sciences nominated Titan Quest for "Role-Playing Game of the Year" at the 10th Annual Interactive Achievement Awards.

== Sequel ==
On August 11, 2023, it was announced that a sequel, titled Titan Quest II, was in development. The game is scheduled to stay in early access until January 19, 2027.
