= STAND (charity) =

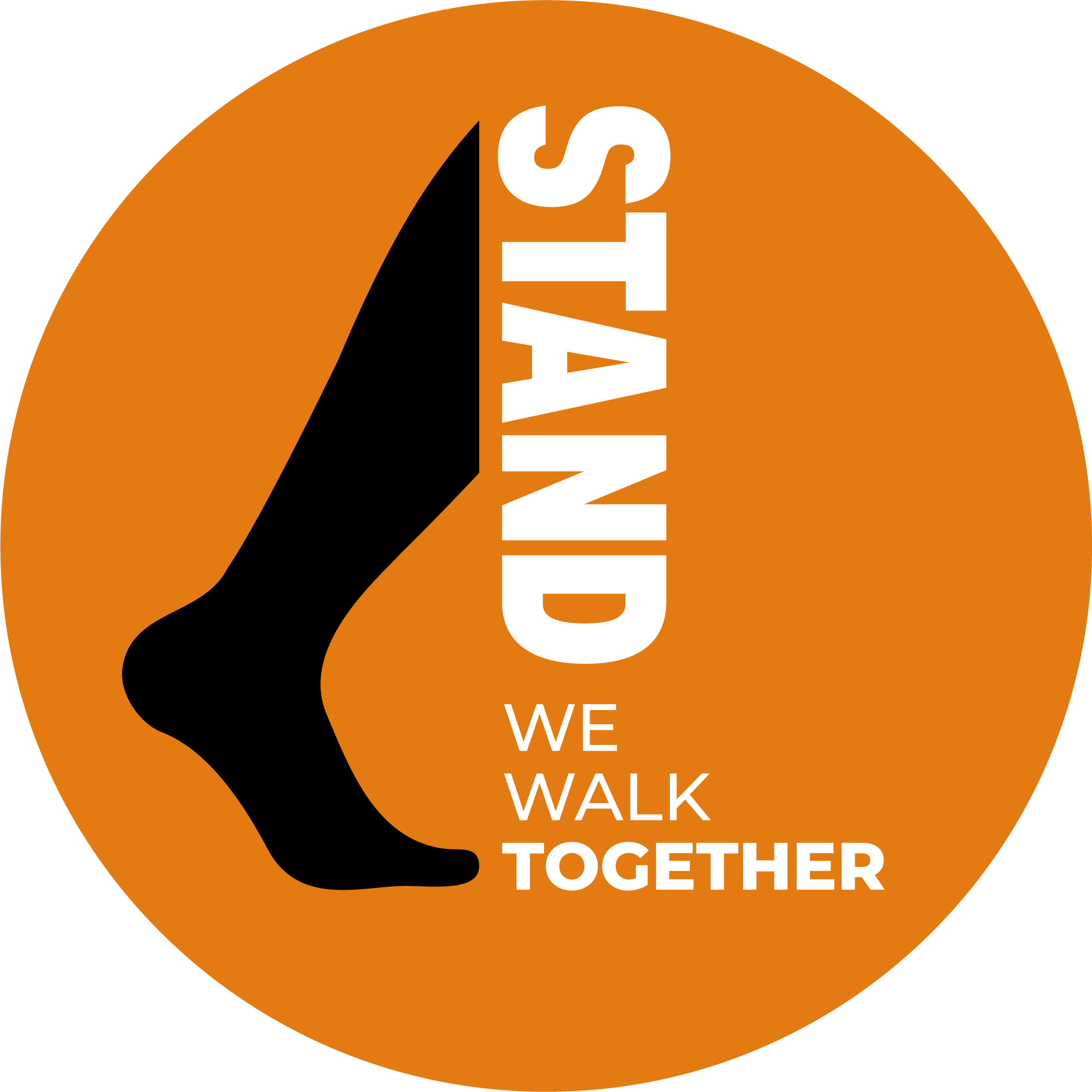
- Formation: 12 March 2014
- Founder: Tom Williams
- Founded at: United Kingdom
- Type: Registered charity
- Purpose: Minimise waste of prosthetic components & provide prosthetic support and rehabilitation for those experiencing limb loss.
- Headquarters: Bristol
- Budget: £570,000
- Staff: 7
- Volunteers: 15
- Website: stand.ngo

Founded as Legs4Africa in 2014, the organisation recently rebranded to STAND. It continues its mission of rescuing unwanted prosthetic legs, refurbishing them, and distributing them to sub-Saharan African countries. Additionally, STAND provides physical and emotional rehabilitation services for amputees.

It was founded in 2014 by Tom Williams; the registered address is in Arnesby, in Leicestershire. In 2014, the charity raised £6000 with a crowdfunder campaign. In April 2014, Legs4Africa sent a van carrying about 500 used prosthetic legs to The Gambia. They were donated to the Royal Victoria Teaching Hospital in Banjul, where prostheses were particularly needed for victims of land mines and diabetes. Another 1000 were sent to The Gambia in January 2015 and in June 2016 about 500 were shipped to Tanzania.

In December 2022, the charity raised £20,000 to help amputees in Northern Ghana. It has rescued over 14,000 prosthetic legs. During the 2023 King's New Year Honours, Tom Williams was awarded the Order of the British Empire.

It currently operates in The Gambia, Senegal, Ghana, Benin, Tanzania, Uganda and Kenya.
