= Titan Quest II =

Upcoming video game

- Developer: Grimlore Games
- Publisher: THQ Nordic
- Engine: Unreal Engine 5
- Platforms: Windows; PlayStation 5; Xbox Series X/S
- Release: Early access; August 1, 2025; Full release; January 19, 2027
- Genre: Action role-playing
- Modes: Single-player, multiplayer

Titan Quest II is an upcoming action role-playing game developed by Grimlore Games and published by THQ Nordic. A sequel to Titan Quest, the game is set to be released for Microsoft Windows, PlayStation 5, and Xbox Series X/S on January 19, 2027. It was released for PC via early access in August 2025.

== Gameplay ==
Titan Quest II is an isometric role-playing video game in which the player must fight against the Greek goddess Nemesis, who corrupts the threads of fate in an effort to eliminate anyone who opposes her. The overall combat abilities of the player character are determined by four primary attributes—Might, Agility, Knowledge, and Vigor—and three secondary attributes: Fitness, Resolve, and Cunning. Certain armors and weapons require minimum attribute levels to equip.

Players can utilize two primary attack types and employ Barrier and Dodge to mitigate or avoid damage. For additional active abilities, players can select from two of four "Masteries", each of whom is catered to a specific playstyle. For instance, the Storm mastery focuses on the use of lightning- and ice-based magic, while the Warfare mastery focuses on melee-combat and direct confrontations with enemies. Skills can be further adjusted using modifiers Players are encouraged to explore each location, where they will find side quests, additional loot and rewards, and hidden boss characters.

== Development ==
Iron Lore Entertainment attempted to create a sequel to Titan Quest immediately after the release of the original game, but they failed to secure funding for the title, resulting in its cancellation. In 2013, Embracer Group (then known as Nordic Games) acquired the rights to the Titan Quest franchise after THQ, the publisher of the original game, declared bankruptcy. Titan Quest II is currently being developed by Grimlore Games, which previously released SpellForce 3. The game is developed using Unreal Engine 5.

Titan Quest II was announced by publisher THQ Nordic in August 2023. Originally set to be released via early access in late 2024 or early 2025, Grimlore Games delayed its release to August 1, 2025, to avoid competing with other new ARPG releases. The game is scheduled to stay in early access until January 19, 2027.

== Sales ==
Titan Quest II sold 300,000 copies in less than 72 hours of its early access release.
