= Alex Brooker =

British television presenter and sports journalist

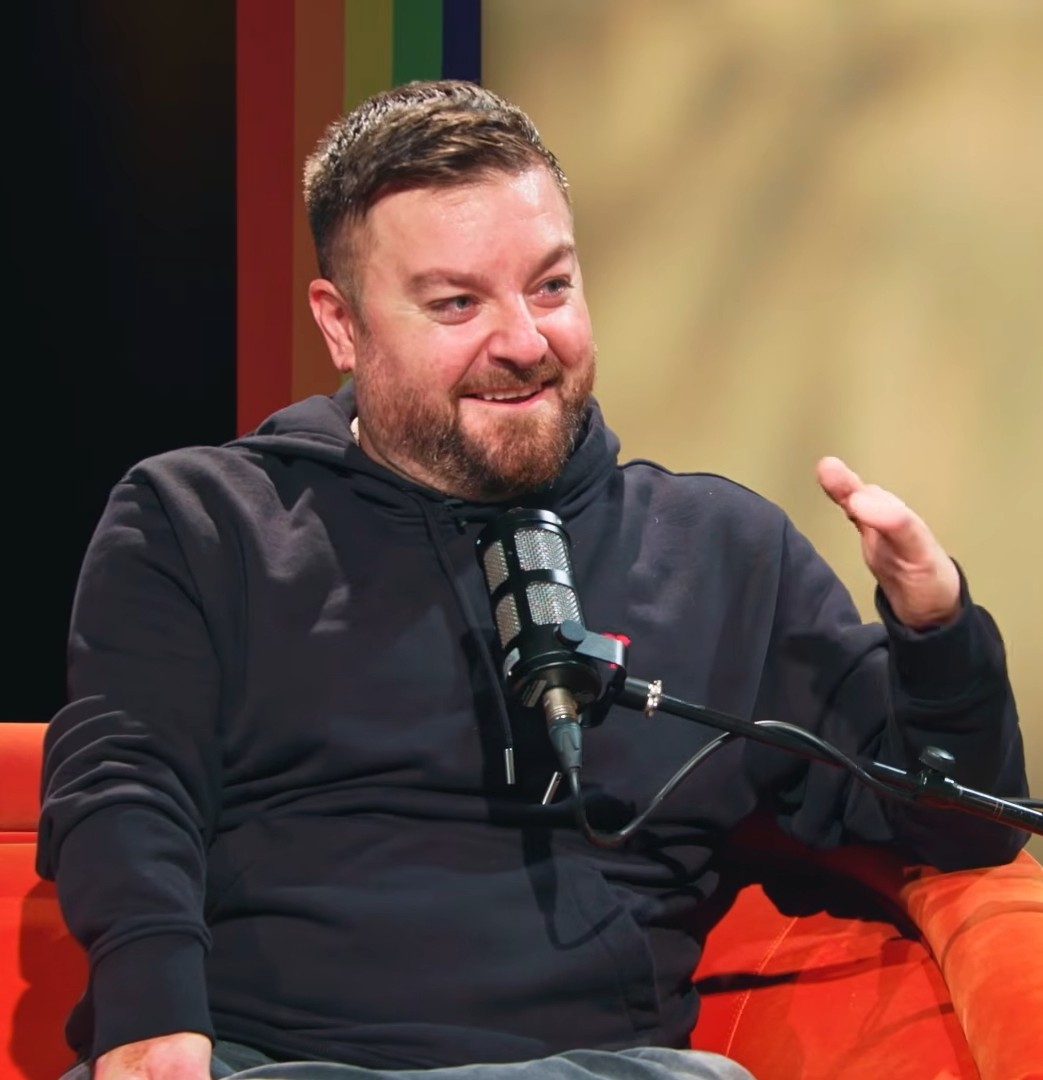
- Brooker in 2026
- Born: Alexander James Brooker; 15 May 1984 (age 42); Croydon, London, England
- Education: Liverpool John Moores University (BA)
- Occupations: Journalist, television presenter, comedian
- Employer: Channel 4
- Notable credits: The Last Leg (2012—present); The Jump (2014); The Superhumans Show (2016)
- Spouse: Lynsey Brooker (m. 2014)
- Children: 2

Alexander James Brooker (born 15 May 1984) is an English journalist and presenter best known for his television work with Channel 4.

Since 2012 Brooker has co-hosted The Last Leg, a Channel 4 panel show with Adam Hills and Josh Widdicombe. He co-presented Channel 4 ski-jumping show The Jump with Davina McCall in 2014. In 2016 he began presenting The Superhumans Show for Channel 4 daytime. In February 2018 Brooker signed with Leeds Rhinos' Foundation PDRL (Physical Disability Rugby League) team.

== Career ==
Brooker went to the Norton Knatchbull School in Ashford, Kent, before graduating from Liverpool John Moores University in 2006 and working as a sports reporter on the Liverpool Echo. He now works for the Press Association.

Brooker entered Channel 4's Half a Million Quid Talent Search in 2012, which aimed to find disabled talent for coverage of the 2012 Summer Paralympic Games and beyond. He first appeared as a trackside reporter on Channel 4's coverage of the 2011 BT Paralympic World Cup. Brooker interviewed the likes of Boris Johnson and David Cameron during the 2012 Summer Paralympics opening ceremony and was a co-host on The Last Leg with Adam Hills, a nightly alternative look at the Games. Brooker was also on The Last Leg of the Year, an end of year special with Adam Hills and Josh Widdicombe.

Since 25 January 2013 Brooker has been a co-host on The Last Leg on Channel 4. In February 2015 Brooker interviewed Nick Clegg for the programme: his performance was described by political journalist Hugo Rifkind as "a model of how to talk normally to a politician – and make them talk normally back".

On 1 August 2013 Brooker hosted a one-off documentary about body image on Channel 4, Alex Brooker: My Perfect Body.

In January and February 2014 Brooker co-presented the first series of celebrity reality show The Jump on Channel 4 opposite Davina McCall. The series was broadcast live over 10 nights from a mountainside in Austria. However, Brooker did not return for the second series in 2015. In 2016, he presented The Superhumans Show on Channel 4.

From 2020 to 2021, he co-presented One Night In with Josh Widdicombe.

In May 2022, the BBC announced that Brooker would be one of the guest presenters to take over Richard Osman's role on Pointless.

In 2024, Brooker participated as "Bigfoot" on the fifth series of The Masked Singer and finished in second place.

== Personal life ==
Brooker was born in Croydon. He was born with congenital abnormalities of his hands and arm, and a twisted right leg which had to be amputated when he was a baby. He now wears a prosthetic leg.

In 2014 Brooker married accountant Lynsey, and the couple have two daughters. The family live in Huddersfield, West Yorkshire.

Brooker is a supporter of Arsenal F.C., appearing regularly on the Footballistically Arsenal podcast.

=== Charity ===
In May 2014, Brooker fronted a campaign called "End The Awkward" by disability charity Scope, which used comedy to shine a light on the awkwardness that many people feel about disability. Brooker appeared in three advertisements guiding viewers through awkward situations that they may encounter with a disabled person.

In September 2012, Brooker won The Million Pound Drop Live with Josh Widdicombe playing for Echoes Foundation, Scope Joseph's Goal.

Brooker is the official ambassador of UK-based charity Legs4Africa.

== Filmography ==
=== Television ===
- Half a Million Quid Talent Search (2012)
- The Last Leg (2012–present)
- Alex Brooker: My Perfect Body (2013)
- The Jump (2014)
- The Superhumans Show (2016)
- The NHS: A People's History (2018)
- Very British Problems (2018)
- Alex Brooker: Disability and Me (2020)
- One Night In (2020–21)
- Hobby Man (2022)

=== Guest appearances ===
- The Million Pound Drop Live (September 2012) – Contestant with Josh Widdicombe
- Alan Carr's Grand National Specstacular (19 March 2013) – Guest
- Sunday Brunch (28 July 2013) – Guest
- Celebrity Fifteen to One (20 September 2013, 13 June 2014) – Contestant
- 8 Out of 10 Cats (18 October 2013, 8 November 2013, 14 April 2014, 4 November 2014, 27 June 2017, 15 April 2019) – Panellist
- Never Mind the Buzzcocks (18 November 2013, 14 October 2014) – Guest
- Fake Reaction (23 January 2014) – Panellist
- Virtually Famous (4 August 2014) – Panellist
- Celebrity Juice (11 September 2014) – Guest
- The Chase: Celebrity Special (20 September 2014) – Contestant
- Celebrity Squares (15 October 2014) – Guest
- The Apprentice: You're Fired! (5 November 2014) – Panellist
- Britain's Got More Talent (28 May 2015) – Panellist
- 8 Out of 10 Cats Does Countdown (28 August 2015) – Panellist
- Celebrity Benchmark (23 October 2015) – Contestant, won £6,000 for charity
- All Star Mr & Mrs (25 November 2015) – Contestant
- Would I Lie to You? (13 January 2016) – Contestant
- Sunday Brunch (6 March 2016)
- Duck Quacks Don't Echo
- Very British Problems (2015–2016) – Interviewee
- John Bishop: In Conversation With... (2016) – Interviewee (Series 1 Episode 4)
- Alex Brooker: Disability and Me (2020) – Presenter
- Tipping Point: Lucky Stars (11 October 2020) – Contestant
- Richard Osman's House of Games (11–15 January 2021, 12–16 February 2024) – Contestant
- Redknapp's Big Night Out (27 May 2021) – Guest
- Big Zuu's Big Eats (25 July 2022) – Guest
- Pointless (7–21 February 2023) – Guest co-host
- The Masked Singer (December 2023 - February 2024) – Bigfoot, runner up
- Bluey (December 2024) – Chef Harlow (minisode "Butlers")
- Romesh Ranganathan's Parents' Evening (18 October 2025) – Contestant
- QI (25 November 2025) - Contestant - Winner
