= Brian Sullivan (game designer) =

American video game designer

Brian Sullivan is a computer game designer and entrepreneur known for developing Titan Quest and the Age of Empires series of games. He is also the co-founder of Iron Lore Entertainment and Ensemble Studios. Sullivan won the 1998 Computer Game Developers Association (GDC) Spotlight Award for Achievement in Game Design for his work on Age of Empires.

In addition to his work in the video game industry, Sullivan has also worked as a professor at Northeastern University, teaching a number of design courses.

Sullivan graduated from Carnegie Mellon University.
