= Alan Carr's Specstacular =

- Title card for Alan Carr's New Year Specstacular
- Presented by: Alan Carr
- Country of origin: United Kingdom
- No. of episodes: 10

Production
- Producer: Open Mike Productions
- Production location: The London Studios
- Running time: 95–150 minutes

Original release
- Network: Channel 4
- Release: 31 December 2011 – 31 December 2017

Related
- Alan Carr: Chatty Man; The Sunday Night Project; The Justin Lee Collins Show

Alan Carr's Specstacular is a special broadcast on Channel 4 presented by Alan Carr. The show features Alan and guests all competing in sketches, games and musical performances. The show was originally broadcast on 31 December 2011 as Alan Carr's New Year Specstacular and has spawned to various other specials including two Summertime Specstaculars in 2012 and a Grand National Specstacular in 2013.

The title sequence, designed by Lee Jacobs, sees Carr mischievously setting off a giant rocket in the basement of Channel 4. It blasts through the roof to the delight of the queueing crowd outside to spell out the show's title.

== Episodes ==
No.	Original release date	Viewers (millions)	Guests
1	31 December 2011	1.86	Jonathan Ross, Micky Flanagan, Melanie Sykes, Gok Wan, Olly Murs, Kirstie Allsopp, Alesha Dixon, Bruno Tonioli, Heston Blumenthal, JLS & The Ting Tings
2	31 December 2012	1.9	Melanie Sykes, Jonathan Ross, Jimmy Carr, Jack Whitehall, Christine Bleakley, Gok Wan, Rylan Clark, Krishnan Guru-Murthy, Jamie Laing, Bruno Mars, DJ Fresh & Ms. Dynamite
3	31 December 2013	2.18	Abbey Clancy, Ben Cohen, James Corden, Keith Lemon, Seann Walsh, Emma Willis, Katy B, Tinie Tempah & Labrinth
4	31 December 2014	1.85	Jonathan Ross, Alesha Dixon, Mark Wright, James Corden, Caroline Flack, Tulisa, Professor Green & Seann Walsh
5	31 December 2015	1.79	David Guetta, Danny Dyer, Mel B, Greg Davies, Kelly Brook, Nish Kumar & Ellie Goulding
6	31 December 2016	1.57	Keith Lemon, Laura Whitmore, Greg Rutherford, Professor Green, Danny Dyer, Will Mellor, Gemma Collins, Sinitta, Bratavio, Professor Green, Tieks & Sinitta
7	31 December 2017	1.32	Big Narstie, Jonnie Peacock, Keith Lemon, Caroline Flack, Alex Brooker & Binky Felstead

=== Summertime Specstacular ===
Alan Carr's Summertime Specstacular was broadcast on 8 June 2012, during the week of celebrations for the Diamond Jubilee of Elizabeth II. Carr was joined by guests David Walliams, Justin Bieber, The Saturdays, the cast of Made in Chelsea, Amy Macdonald, Carol Vorderman, Paddy McGuinness, Christian Jessen and Rizzle Kicks. Carr was also visited by Russell Brand via video link.

The special was watched by 1.746 million viewers, the second most watched broadcast on Channel 4 that week.

=== Summertime Specstacular 2 ===
Alan Carr's Summertime Specstacular 2 was broadcast on 17 August 2012, during Channel 4's Funny Fortnight. Guests included Jonathan Ross, Tulisa, Keith Lemon, Melanie Sykes, Paloma Faith, Labrinth and Fatima Whitbread. Team GB Olympic medallists Mo Farah, Nicola Adams, Greg Rutherford, Louis Smith, Heather Stanning and Helen Glover also appeared.

The special was watched by 1.37 million viewers.

=== Grand National Specstacular ===
On 19 March 2013 Alan Carr's Grand National Specstacular was announced by Channel 4 as part of their line-up of programming building up to the 2013 Grand National. The 95-minute special was broadcast on 5 April 2013, on the eve of the Grand National, and featured Jonathan Ross, Paddy McGuinness, Kimberley Walsh, Louis Walsh, James Nesbitt, Abbey Clancy, Rylan Clark, Alex Brooker, Russell Brand and Clare Balding, with music performed by Madness.

Miranda Hart was scheduled to appear but could not after injuring her knee earlier in the week.

The celebrities played games and drew out which horses they got in the sweepstake.

The special pulled in 1.49 million viewers.

=== Alan Carr's Christmas Cracker ===
On 25 December 2018, Alan Carr hosted a Christmas extravaganza in his own style from his very own Alpine Log Cabin. Guests included Channing Tatum, Emilia Fox, Danny Dyer, Lily Allen, Sharon Horgan, Olly Murs, Russell Howard, Alesha Dixon, Freddie Fox, Dani Dyer, Vicky McClure, Martin Compston, and Chris Kamara, plus surprise sketches and musical performances.

== Controversy ==
During the 2013 festivities, the guests discussed adult themes, including Gok Wan telling Carr to "fuck off" and joking that he would not perform oral sex on him, Blumenthal talking about a strap-on sex toy and Ross commenting on a full-frontal naked picture of N-Dubz star Dappy. Following the show, Channel 4 received fifty-seven complaints from viewers, and it was believed that government-approved regulatory authority for the broadcasting, telecommunications and postal industries, Ofcom, would investigate the show. However, after consideration, Ofcom has confirmed that the show had met "generally accepted standards" for a show aired after the 9pm watershed. A Channel 4 spokesman said: "It was an irreverent end-of-year party, appropriately scheduled post-watershed with clear warnings."
