= Education Plus Initiative =

The Education Plus Initiative (2021–2025) was created to prevent the spread of AIDS in adolescent girls and young women. It is a joint initiative of five organizations, namely; United Nations States Agency for International Development (UNAIDS), United Nations Educational, Scientific and Cultural Organisation (UNESCO), United Nations Population Fund formerly, United Nations Fund for Population Activities (UNFPA), United Nations Children Fund formerly, the United Nations International Children Emergency Fund (UNICEF) and UN Women.

The five-year initiative was launched in 2021 during the Generation Equality Forum at Paris. The initiative was intended to help protect the health and safety of girls and young women.

== Context ==
The initiative was launched in line with the 2016 Political Declaration on Ending AIDS. The Declaration aimed at reducing the spread of HIV globally among adolescents and young women between the ages of 15 and 25 years. By then, in Sub-Sahara Africa, adolescent girls and young women constituted a quarter of all new case recorded in the year 2019. In 2019, the number of new cases were 2,800,003 worldwide.

It was estimated that 4,500 of adolescents acquires the disease every week. The statistics indicated that adolescent girls in Sub-Sahara Africa represents 72% of all new cases among the adolescents worldwide, and 14% of all cases worldwide. In 2019, 23,000 adolescent girls and young women died of HIV related illnesses.

It was noted that adolescent girls and young women have double the risk of contracting the disease compared to their male counterparts. Statistics also indicated that keeping girls in secondary school helps protect them from acquiring the disease. These findings provided the rationale for the initiative to claim secondary education as a positive right for adolescent girls.

== Creation ==
Education Plus Initiative was first announced by a United Nations States Agency for International Development (UNAIDS) executive director at the Nairobi Summit in November 2019. The initiative was endorsed and co-led by the heads of UNAIDS, UNESCO, UNFPA, UNICEF and UN Women. It was launched during the Generation Equality Forum in Paris, France in July 2019.

On 17 July 2022, 12 Sub-Sahara African nations announced the launch of the initiative, which was described as a commitment to girls' and women's education and safety. At the continental launch, Leaders of the Africa Union 4th Mid-Year Coordinating Meeting in Lusaka, Zambia pledged to support the Education Plus Initiative. The President of the African Union, President Macky Sall of Senegal, launched the initiative with the support of other Heads of State and also the Chairperson of the Africa Union Commission Moussa Faki Mahamat.

== Participating countries ==
The participating countries that lead the initiative and act as peer motivators to other countries are referred to as "champion countries" by the initiative. According to the initiative, fifteen African countries in the Sub-Sahara Africa had signed up to be champions of the initiatives. They include:

- Benin
- Cameroon
- Eswatini
- Gabon
- The Gambia
- Lesotho
- Malawi
- Senegal
- Sierra Leone
- South Africa
- Tanzania
- Uganda
- Zambia
