= Edward Francis Small Teaching Hospital =

Coordinates: 13°27′27″N 16°34′39″W

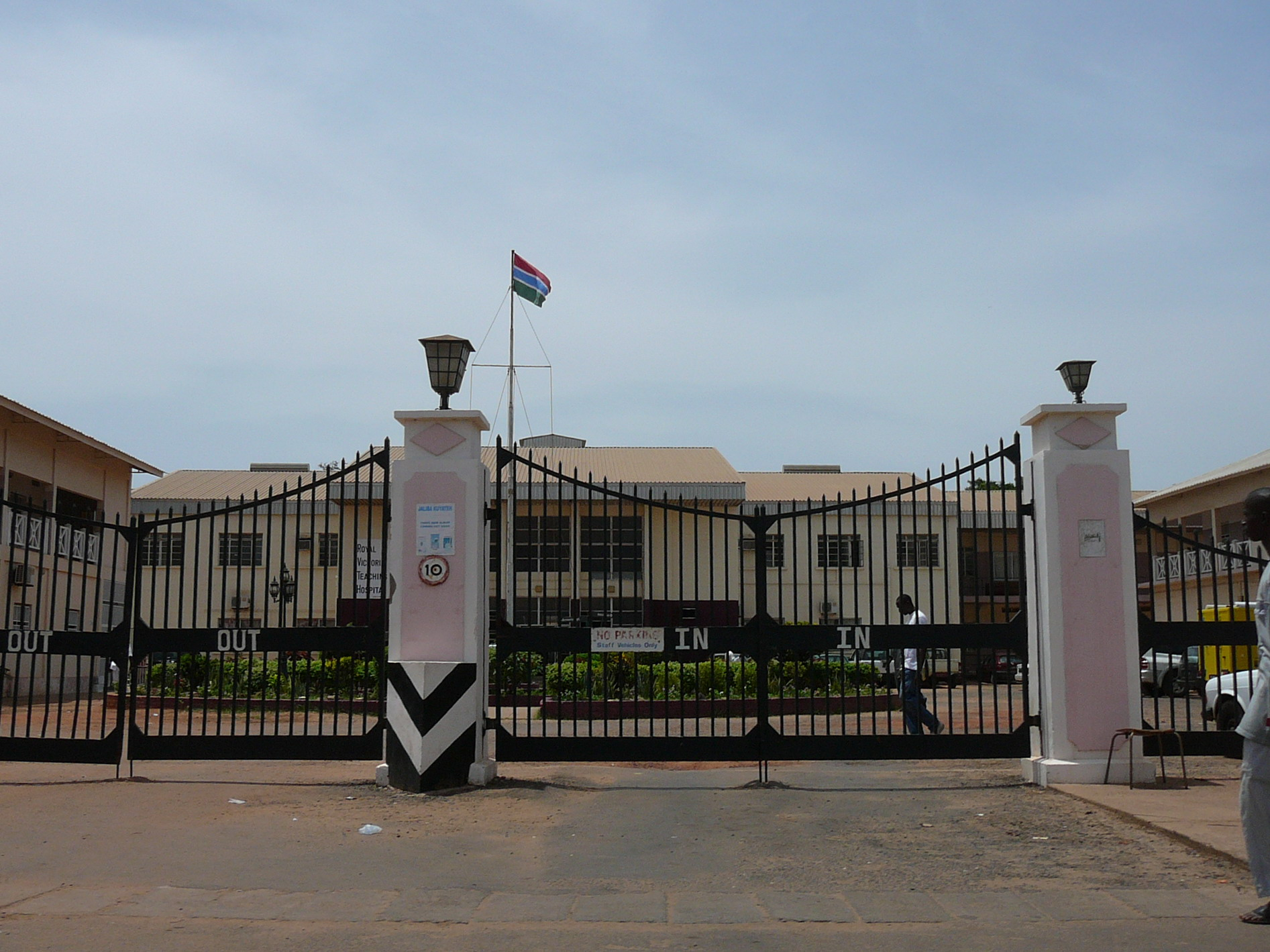

Geography
- Location: Banjul, the Gambia

Organisation
- Type: Teaching Hospital
- Affiliated university: University of the Gambia

Services
- Beds: 540

Links
- Lists: Hospitals in the Gambia

Edward Francis Small Teaching Hospital (EFSTH) is a tertiary referral hospital in Banjul, the capital city of The Gambia. It is the largest hospital in the country, originally founded by British colonialists in 1853. Until 2013, it was known as the Royal Victoria Teaching Hospital (RVTH).

== History ==
Edward Francis Small Teaching Hospital (EFSTH) was founded in 1853 by the British colonial government of what was then the Gambia Colony and Protectorate.

The World Health Organization (WHO) donated two million dalasis-worth of equipment for maternal and childcare in 2014.

In 2019, the Nurses' Association at the hospital made a public statement lamenting poor working conditions and low salary.

In particular, they named the lack of basic items such as proper bins to dispose of waste and fridges to keep medications and other items.

== Departments ==
=== Paediatrics ===
The paediatric department has 100 beds and admits around 3000 patients annually. It primarily admits patients with severe malaria, acute respiratory infection, malnutrition, septicaemia, and gastroenteritis.

=== Maternity ===
Maternity care in The Gambia is free and is provided by the government. Evidence suggests that more than half of caesarean sections in The Gambia are carried out at EFSTH.

=== Blood ===
There is a blood bank at EFSTH, but blood is often in short supply and patients' relatives are often required to donate their own blood. This can result in delays to emergency blood transfusion services.

== Teaching ==
EFSTH became a teaching hospital during the 1990s, in order to tackle the reliance on foreign doctors. The school is operated in conjunction with the University of the Gambia. Its first intake was in 1999 and it had taught 76 doctors by the end of 2011. It offers a six-year undergraduate MBBS course.
