= Grim Dawn =

2016 action role-playing game

- Developer: Crate Entertainment
- Publisher: Crate Entertainment
- Composers: Steve Pardo; Chris Wilson
- Engine: Titan Quest
- Platforms: Windows; Xbox One
- Release: Windows; February 25, 2016; Xbox One; December 3, 2021
- Genres: Action role-playing, hack and slash
- Modes: Single-player, multiplayer

Grim Dawn is an action role-playing game for Windows developed by Crate Entertainment and published in February 2016. A version for Xbox One was released in December 2021. Developed using the Titan Quest engine, it is set in a thematically dark fictional world loosely based on the Victorian era. It received generally favorable reviews from critics and had sold 7 million units (including its DLC) by February 2022.

== Plot ==
Grim Dawn takes place in Cairn, a setting in which humanity has been brought to near extinction by a trans-dimensional war.

The conflict begins when the humans in the setting begin to contact Aetherial entities from another dimension. Using what was learned from these entities, they open a portal to bring one into their own dimension and learn that the Aetherials could possess humans, and that these humans would retain enhanced abilities after the spirit was removed from the host. The people then released more Aetherials into the world, who themselves opened more portals and would intend to use humanity for their own purposes.

This attracted the attention of another race known as the Cthonians, who declared war to destroy humanity before it could be completely dominated. The war caused enormous numbers of casualties to the human population and damaged the fabric of reality, causing additional horrors to manifest.

The remaining human survivors reside in scattered enclaves, observing the war to learn of their enemies' weaknesses and using powers gained from exposure to the warp to prepare to retaliate at the invaders.

== Gameplay ==
Grim Dawn is an action role-playing game that features fast-paced real-time combat and emphasizes collecting loot, such as armor, potions, weapons, and money (in the form of Iron Bits). The game's crafting system is similar to the one used in Warcraft III: Reign of Chaos's popular mod Defense of the Ancients. Grim Dawn also builds upon systems from Titan Quest, including improved physics, location-specific damage effects, dynamic weather, a rotatable camera, dismemberment, the addition of factions, and a completely redesigned quest system.

=== Character classes ===
There are ten distinct character classes in the game.

- Six from the base game (Soldier, Demolitionist, Occultist, Nightblade, Arcanist, Shaman).
- Two from the Ashes of Malmouth expansion (Inquisitor, Necromancer).
- One from the expansion, The Forgotten Gods (Oathkeeper).
- One from the expansion, Fangs of Asterkarn (Berserker).

Each player character can combine two of these classes and their various skills and modifiers.

=== Factions ===
The game features several non-player character (NPC) factions, with some of them friendly to the player, and others hostile. The player can earn favor with some factions to unlock additional quest lines, vendor discounts and special faction-based items and augments. Some neutral factions can be turned into allies, but aiding one will make the enemy of another. Hostile factions will remember your deeds and deepen their hatred, sending out large packs and elite heroes to hunt the player down. Some initially friendly factions may also become hostile depending on player choices.

=== Devotion ===
A system of skills that serves as an extra layer of character development. The devotion system lets the player acquire devotion points by finding and restoring destroyed or corrupted shrines hidden throughout the game world, and spend them to unlock various bonuses and abilities from a giant constellation map.

=== Crafting ===
The game's crafting system allows you to combine salvaged components into unique crafted items and then, later, use those basic crafted items with higher-tiered recipes to produce powerful equipment and consumables. Blueprints and Recipes can be collected from slain enemies, chests or quest rewards.

=== Difficulty ===
Grim Dawn has three difficulty levels: Normal, Elite and Ultimate. As with Titan Quest and some other games of the ARPG genre, each subsequent difficulty is unlocked by defeating the Final Boss of the base game on the previous difficulty (ex. to unlock Elite Difficulty, you must first complete Normal Difficulty base game content).

Normal also has a "Veteran" mode, for additional challenge, which increases monster damage and stats, as well as granting an Experience boost. In July 2026, as part of the Fangs of Asterkarn expansion, the Ascendent mode was added for as a modifier of the Ultimate difficulty level, which greatly enhances enemy stats.

On creation of a new character the player also has the option of selecting Hardcore mode, in which a character's death is permanent and thus becomes no longer playable. Any equipment a Hardcore character has at time of death is lost forever. Hardcore mode characters do not share a stash with Normal mode characters and can only join multiplayer sessions with other Hardcore characters.

=== Multiplayer ===
Players can form a party of up to four members. The strength and toughness of monsters scale with the number of players, as does the amount of loot. Items and Iron Bits can be traded between players in a party. The host of a multiplayer session can also enable Player vs. Player (PvP) mode, in which players who are not in the same party can attack and kill each other.

== Development ==
Following Iron Lore Entertainment's failure to secure funding for its next project, former members of Iron Lore announced they had created a new company on February 18, 2008. Nine days later, the company announced it would be working as a contractor for Demiurge Studios, providing art and design leadership on one of the company's projects.

On August 19, 2008, Crate announced the acquisition of the Black Legion intellectual property that has been in development at Iron Lore before the studio closed. Iron Lore had attracted significant interest from publishers while pitching Black Legion in late 2007 but had not been able to survive long enough to close a publishing deal. Crate had hoped to pick up on the momentum that Black Legion had gained but due to the U.S. economic recession publishers opted to pass on a large project from the studio.

Crate Entertainment announced on July 27, 2009, that they had licensed the Titan Quest engine from Iron Lore and announced Grim Dawn's development on January 21, 2010. Initially, few details were revealed, with Crate Entertainment stating that Grim Dawn is set in a thematically dark fictional world loosely based on the Victorian era.

Grim Dawn's development is notable for Crate Entertainment's open appeal to their fans for financial support. In a posting on the game's official website, the developers announced that after a period of increased email activity from fans wishing to donate to Crate to support the project, they had added a pre-order page to the game's official website allowing fans to contribute to the project in an official manner. Fifteen days later in another posting on the game's official website, Crate stated that they had received financial support from the gaming website Gamebanshee and one of the authors of the gaming-related web comic Penny Arcade. Despite this support from their fans and various websites, Crate manager Arthur Bruno stated in an interview with The Escapist that pre-orders made for only a very small percentage of Grim Dawn's total budget. In a later interview with the gaming website Big Download, Bruno again confirmed that donations and pre-orders alone were insufficient to fund the project completely. Additionally, Bruno revealed that Crate intended to provide new gameplay content for Grim Dawn through expansions every six to ten months.

On April 17, 2012, Crate Entertainment opened a project page on Kickstarter, setting a funding goal of $280,000, with the halfway point of this goal being reached in four days. It finished up with $537,515, well exceeding its initial funding goal. Crate released an alpha version of the game (Build 8) through the Steam Early Access program on May 15, 2013.

== Release ==
On February 25, 2016, the game entered full release with v1.0.0.0 (build 31 hotfix 1). The version for Xbox One, featuring all previous DLC and expansions, was released on December 3, 2021.

=== Downloadable content and expansions ===
The Crucible

On August 3, 2016, a new game mode called The Crucible was released as downloadable content.

Ashes of Malmouth

On October 11, 2017 Grim Dawn's first expansion, Ashes of Malmouth, was released

The Forgotten Gods

On March 5, 2018, a second expansion was announced, called Forgotten Gods, and was released on March 27, 2019.

Fangs of Asterkarn

On August 29, 2023, Fangs of Asterkarn, Grim Dawn's third expansion was announced. It was released on July 23, 2026.

== Reception ==
=== Critical reception ===
Reception

Aggregate score
| Aggregator | Score |
|---|---|
| Metacritic | PC: 83/100; XONE: 86/100 |

Review scores
| Publication | Score |
|---|---|
| GameSpot | 8/10 |
| IGN | 8.7/10 |
| PC Gamer (US) | 83/100 |

Grim Dawn received generally favorable reviews from 29 critics, according to review aggregator Metacritic.

Leif Johnson of PC Gamer wrote: "If anything, Grim Dawn is both empowered and chained down by its retro stylings, preventing, say, the randomized levels of Diablo III and thus its endless potential for replay. But on the upside, none of its recent competitors deliver that old-style hack-and-slash experience so purely and so satisfyingly, and its hybrid class system makes each new jaunt a little different. More than once it found me playing until dawn, and my appreciation for any game that manages to do that is anything but grim."

=== Sales ===
By May 2017, Grim Dawn had sold over 1 million units worldwide and its DLC, Crucible had sold over 200,000.

In April 2019, Crate announced that the Forgotten Gods expansion had sold over 100,000 units, bringing the total number of units sold between the base game and its DLC to over 3 million.

In May 2020, one of the game's designers stated in a forum post that the game and its DLC were approaching a total of 5 million units sold.

In February 2022, Crate announced that the game and its DLC had sold 7 million units.
