= Iron Lore Entertainment =

American video game developer

- Company type: Corporation
- Founded: Maynard, Massachusetts (2000)
- Defunct: February 27, 2008
- Fate: Defunct
- Headquarters: Maynard, Massachusetts
- Key people: Brian Sullivan, Founder, First President, Creative Director; Paul Chieffo, Founder, Technology Director; Jeff Goodsill, Producer, President; Arthur Bruno, Designer; Ian S. Frazier, Producer
- Products: Titan Quest; Titan Quest: Immortal Throne
- Number of employees: 39 (peak)
- Website: www.ironlore.com

Iron Lore Entertainment was an American video game developer founded in October 2000 by Brian Sullivan and Paul Chieffo.

== History ==
In late June 2006, the company released Titan Quest, an action role-playing video game for publisher THQ. Titan Quest is set in ancient Greece, Egypt, Mesopotamia and China, and makes use of the mythology of those civilizations. The company released an expansion pack, Titan Quest: Immortal Throne, in March 2007.

Iron Lore received the New Studio award at the 7th annual Game Developers Choice Awards, recognizing outstanding achievement of a studio whose first title was released in 2006.

It was announced in the October 2007 issue of Games for Windows Magazine that Iron Lore Entertainment was assisting with the development of the Relic Entertainment title Warhammer 40,000: Dawn of War: Soulstorm, which was the third and final expansion for Dawn of War. It proved to be their last project.

On February 27, 2008, it was announced that Iron Lore Entertainment had closed down owing to an inability to secure funding for its next project.

== Legacy ==
Following the closure, former members of Iron Lore formed a new company called Crate Entertainment.
