= Strange Brigade =

2018 video game

- Developer: Rebellion Developments
- Publisher: Rebellion Developments
- Director: Tim Jones
- Designers: Steve Bristow; Kory Vandenberg
- Artist: Andy Pattinson
- Writer: Gordon Rennie
- Platforms: Windows; PlayStation 4; Xbox One; Stadia; Nintendo Switch
- Release: Windows, PlayStation 4, Xbox One: WW: 28 August 2018; Google Stadia: WW: 1 August 2020; Nintendo Switch: WW: 15 June 2021
- Genre: Third-person shooter
- Modes: Single-player, multiplayer

Strange Brigade is a 2018 cooperative third-person shooter game developed and published by Rebellion Developments. In the game, the player fights against different mythological enemies and solves puzzles. It was released for PlayStation 4, Windows, Xbox One on 28 August 2018, for Stadia on 1 August 2020, and for Nintendo Switch on 15 June 2021. It received mixed reviews from critics.

== Gameplay ==
Strange Brigade is a third-person shooter with a huge emphasis on cooperative gameplay. In the game, the player assumes the role of an adventurer in the 1930s and can team up with three other players to fight against different mythological enemies like mummies, giant scorpions and minotaurs. The game's four playable characters, who can be customized, have different weapons and abilities. Players have a large arsenal of weapons at their disposal. Each weapon has several upgrade slots, which can be used to enhance combat efficiency. Players can switch and upgrade their weapons at the workbenches found in a level. They can also activate different traps, such as spinning blades and spikes, to kill enemies.

The game features branching levels which encourage exploration. By solving puzzles, players will discover new relics which can unlock "amulet powers". These powerful amulet powers can be activated by absorbing the souls of enemies. Players can also find treasure chests to unlock powerful prototype weapons, and collect gold coins to purchase new weapons.

== Plot ==
4000 years ago Seteki, an Egyptian Pharaoh, ruled tyrannically, using black magic. Wadjet, the Goddess of Time and Justice, opposed Seteki's barbaric rule, and along with her priests went to war against Seteki, eventually leading to Seteki's defeat. Her body was hidden in a nameless tomb and all record of her existence was erased, her name living on only in legend.

In 1930 after Several thousand years passed, The archaeologist Edgar Harbin releases Seteki's spirit after he opened her tomb to further his career. Veronica Brownring, an agent of the Department of Antiquities who was keeping an eye on Harbin, managed to send a distress message to headquarters prior to the release. The Department dispatches the Strange Brigade, a team of people experienced in defending the British Empire from supernatural threats to uncover what Seteki is after.

Searching a hidden valley leads to the group discovering a soul cage, which Seteki is using to harness the power of trapped souls. Destroying the cage results in Seteki's power being reduced. So the groups sets out to destroy the rest.

The Strange Brigade set out across Egypt to foil Seteki's plans and rid the world of her undead army.

After destroying the last Soul Cage, the Brigade are informed that they are not finished yet, and though the cages are destroyed, Seteki herself is still loose, and may have a plan for world destruction, by opening a bridge between the mortal realm and the Underworld.

The Brigade sets out to finish Seteki off once and for all, following her into the underworld, finding her in control of Ammit, the Devourer of Souls. Seteki commands the beast to attack the Brigade, however they manage to break Seteki's control over the beast, and after sufficiently enraging the beast, it turns on Seteki and devours her, ending her threat to humanity once and for all.

The Brigade heads off to find the portal back to the mortal realm, sharing some light banter, comparing their fight with Seteki to their past adventures.

== Development ==
Strange Brigade was developed by Rebellion Developments. The gameplay was inspired by cooperative games such as Left 4 Dead and Rebellion's own Zombie Army Trilogy, while the story and the game's tone were inspired by the adventure serials released in the 1930s.

== Release ==
Strange Brigade was announced on 7 June 2017. The game was released for PlayStation 4, Windows, and Xbox One on 28 August 2018. Players who pre-ordered the game were given access to the "Secret Service Weapons" pack, while those who purchased the Digital Deluxe edition have access to the game's season pass and other post-launch content for free. A Collector's Edition contained physical items such as an airship model and an artbook.

== Reception ==
Reception

Aggregate score
Aggregator	Score
Metacritic	(PC) 68/100 (PS4) 73/100 (XONE) 75/100

Review scores
Publication	Score
GameRevolution	7/10
GameSpot	7/10
GamesRadar+	3/5
Hardcore Gamer	3.5/5
IGN	7.5/10
PC Gamer (US)	68/100
Push Square	7/10
Shacknews	5/10
VideoGamer.com	6/10

=== Critical reception ===
Strange Brigade received "mixed or average" reviews from critics for the PC and PlayStation 4 versions, while the Xbox One version received "generally favorable" reviews, according to review aggregator website Metacritic.

In December 2018, Strange Brigade was featured as one of The Telegraph's "50 best games of 2018".

=== Awards ===
Year	Award	Category	Result	Ref.
2017	Gamescom 2017	Best Booth Award	Nominated	
2019	National Academy of Video Game Trade Reviewers Awards	Art Direction, Period Influence	Nominated	
2019	National Academy of Video Game Trade Reviewers Awards	Game, Original Adventure	Nominated	
2019	The Independent Game Developers' Association Awards	Heritage Award	Nominated	
