= PathEngine =

French software company

- Industry: Software
- Founded: 2000; 26 years ago
- Website: pathengine.com

PathEngine is a software company as well as an advanced path finding software development kit, created under the leadership of Thomas Young. The company was founded after Young left Infogrames Sheffield, and the first commercial version of the software was offered in 2002. The software uses a technique called points of visibility path finding, where the agent takes into account dynamic obstacles and agent shape when navigating between points. Over time, the software has been optimized with rapid bug-fixes, and has been made to support platforms such as the Xbox 360. PathEngine has been used in games such as Titan Quest, among others.

== History ==
PathEngine was founded in 2000. The first version of PathEngine SDK was released in early 2002. By the end of 2005, over 50 finished products had been released that used PathEngine.

In 2007, the 5.10 version was released. Improvements included a new graph search core and several bugfixes. In 2010, PathEngine released version 5.23.

== Features ==
PathEngine supports personal computers running the Microsoft Windows, Linux and FreeBSD, as well as the game consoles of Xbox 360 and PlayStation 3.

PathEngine implements the search for the path and the movement of the agent in a three-dimensional medium with dynamic obstacles. There is a dynamic control overcoming obstacles and automation of content. Such a technology applied to some very large and detailed worlds includes special optimization for embossed surfaces (or other surfaces that combine detailed obstacles with a good overview and large open spaces).

== License terms ==
PathEngine is a commercial software product created solely for the purpose of being licensed by third parties. There are three types of licenses for PathEngine SDK, each of which differs in price and level of access to the source code. In addition, each license may differ depending on which and how many platforms the final product will be released on.
