= List of video games released in 2027 =

The following is a comprehensive index of all games releasing in 2027, sorted chronologically by release date, and divided by quarter. Information regarding developer, publisher, operating system, genre, and type of release is provided where available.

For a summary of 2027 in video games as a whole, see 2027 in video games.

== Legend ==
Video game platforms
DROID	Android	iOS	iOS, iPhone, iPod, iPadOS, iPad, visionOS, Apple Vision Pro	LIN	Linux, SteamOS
OSX	macOS	NS	Nintendo Switch	NS2	Nintendo Switch 2
PS4	PlayStation 4	PS5	PlayStation 5	PSVR	Playstation VR, PlayStation VR2
Quest	Meta Quest / Oculus Quest family, including Oculus Rift	tvOS	tvOS	WIN	Windows, all versions Windows 95 and up
XBO	Xbox One	XBX/S	Xbox Series X/S		

Types of releases
Compilation	A compilation, anthology or collection of several titles, usually (but not always) belonging to the same series
Early access	A game launched in early access is unfinished and thus might contain bugs and glitches or have some of the content missing
Episodic	An episodic video game that is released in batches over a period of time
Expansion	A large-scale DLC to an already existing game that adds new story, areas and additions and/or changes to the game's mechanics
Full release	A full release of a game that launched in early access first
Limited	A special release (often called "Limited" or "Collector's Edition") with bonus collector's material. Often provided to people who pre-order a game
Port	The game first appeared on a different platform and a port was made. The game is like the original, with few or no differences
Remake	The game is an enhanced remake of an original, made using a new engine and/or assets and thus containing completely new sound, graphics and possibly changes to the story and/or gameplay
Remaster	The game is a remaster of an original, released on the same or different platform, with (usually minor) changes to graphics, sound and/or gameplay
Rerelease	The game was re-released on the same platform with no or only minor changes

Video game genres
4X	4X game	Action	Action game	Action RPG	Action role-playing game
Action-adventure	Action-adventure game	Adventure	Adventure game	Auto battler	Auto battler
Battle royale	Battle royale game	Brawler	Beat 'em up	Bullet heaven	Vampire Survivors–like
Bullet hell	Bullet hell	Business sim	Business simulation game	City builder	City-building game
CMS	Construction and management simulation	Cozy	Cozy game	Dating sim	Dating sim
DCCG	Digital collectible card game	Deck building	Deck building game	Dungeon crawl	Dungeon crawl
Extraction shooter	Extraction shooter	Farming	Farm life sim	Fighting	Fighting game
Fitness	Fitness game	FPS	First-person shooter	God game	God game
Graphic adventure	Graphic adventure	Hack and slash	Hack and slash	Hero shooter	Hero shooter
Horror	Horror game	Immersive sim	Immersive sim	Interactive film	Interactive film
Life sim	Life simulation game	Metroidvania	Metroidvania	MMO	Massively multiplayer online game
MOBA	Multiplayer online battle arena	Monster tamer	Monster-taming game	Music	Music video game
Narrative adventure	Narrative adventure game	Otome	Otome game	Party	Party video game
Platform fighter	Platform fighter	Platformer	Platformer	Puzzle	Puzzle video game
Racing	Racing video game	Rhythm	Rhythm game	Roguelike	Roguelike, Roguelite
RPG	Role-playing video game	RTS	Real-time strategy	RTT	Real-time tactics
Run and gun	Run and gun game	Sandbox	Sandbox game	Scrolling shooter	Scrolling shooter
Shoot 'em up	Shoot 'em up	Shooter	Shooter game	Simulation	Simulation video game
Social sim	Social simulation game	Soulslike	Soulslike	Sports	Sports video game
Stealth	Stealth game	Strategy	Strategy video game	Survival	Survival game
Survival horror	Survival horror	Tactical RPG	Tactical role-playing game	Tactical shooter	Tactical shooter
TBS	Turn-based strategy	TBT	Turn-based tactics	Tower defense	Tower defense
TPS	Third-person shooter	Vehicular combat	Vehicular combat game	Virtual pet	Virtual pet
Visual novel	Visual novel				

== List ==
=== January–March ===
Release date	Title	Platform(s)	Type(s)	Genre(s)	Developer(s)	Publisher(s)	Ref.
January 7	Armatus	WIN, NS2, PS5, XBX/S	Original	Roguelike, TPS	Counterplay Games	Fictions	
January 7	BrokenLore: Ascend	WIN, PS5, XBX/S	Original	Horror, Survival	Serafini Productions		
January 8	Ember & Blade	WIN, OSX, LIN	Early access	Action RPG, Rougelike	LINE Games Corporation		
January 11	Bad House	WIN	Original	Auto battler, Strategy	Andrew Morrish	Dometu	
January 11	The Hambagu Shop	WIN, NS, PS5, XBX/S	Original	Cozy, Horror, Simulation	Mike Ten	Serafini Productions	
January 12	High Roller Penny	WIN	Original	Rougelike	Kniv Studio		
January 13	Lucky Luke: The Lonesome Cowboy Collection	WIN, NS, NS2, PS4, PS5, XBO, XBX/S	Compilation	Shooter	Graphite Lab, Implicit Conversions	Infogrames	
January 14	13Z: The Zodiac Trials	WIN, NS2, PS5	Original	Action, Roguelike	Mixed Realms	Mixed Realms, Clouded Leopard Entertainment (consoles)	
January 14	Danganronpa 2×2	WIN, NS, NS2, PS5, XBX/S	Remake	Visual novel, Adventure	Gemdrops, Too Kyo Games	Spike Chunsoft	
January 14	Sturmjäger	WIN, NS, PS5, XBX/S	Original	Shoot 'em up	Byteproduct		
January 14	Terranigma	WIN, NS, NS2, PS4, PS5, XBX/S	Remaster	Action RPG	Clear River Games		
January 15	Ananta	WIN, PS5, iOS, DROID	Original	Action RPG	Naked Rain	NetEase	
January 15	Fitness Boxing: Touken Ranbu – Shutsujin! Exercise Honmaru (JP)	NS, NS2	Original	Fitness, Rhythm, Sports	Imagineer		
January 15	Stranger Than Heaven	WIN, PS5, XBX/S	Original	Action-adventure	RGG Studio	Sega	
January 15	TankRat	WIN, PS5	Original	Action-adventure	Alpha Channel	Kepler Interactive	
January 18	Cook, Serve, Delicious!: Re-Mustard!	WIN	Remaster	Cooking	Vertigo Gaming		
January 19	Titan Quest II	WIN, PS5, XBX/S	Full release	Action RPG	Grimlore Games	THQ Nordic	
January 19	isekizima: Ruins and Tails Journey	WIN	Original	Action, Platformer	TamagawaSoft		
January 20	Cats in the Shell	WIN	Early access	Auto battler, Roguelike	Raven Studio	Infini Fun	
January 20	Usual June	WIN, OSX, XBX/S	Original	Action-adventure	Finji		
January 21	Arizona Sunshine	WIN, NS2, PS5, XBX/S	Remake	TPS	Vertigo Games		
January 21	Crystals of Irm	WIN, NS, PS4, PS5, XBO, XBX/S	Original	RPG	Lots of Stuff Games	Deck13 Spotlight	
January 21	DevilConnection	NS, iOS, DROID	Port	Adventure	ChaoGames	Playism	
January 21	Lelu	WIN, NS2, XBX/S	Original	Metroidvania	jamierowan	Electronic Sheep Games, Super Rare Originals	
January 21	Temtem: Swarm	NS	Port	Action, Rougelike	Crema, GGTech Studios	Crema	
January 21	Wandering Sword	NS, NS2, PS5, XBX/S	Port	RPG	The Swordman Studio	Clouded Leopard Entertainment, Spiral Up Games	
January 26	Cleaner Company	WIN	Original	Simulation	Wildflame Studio	Mythwright	
January 26	Everything is Crab	NS, NS2, PS5, XBX/S	Port	Roguelite	Odd Dreams Digital	Secret Mode	
January 26	Forza Horizon 6	PS5	Port	Racing	Playground Games	Xbox Game Studios	
January 26	Villion: Code (WW)	WIN, NS, NS2, PS4, PS5	Port	RPG	Compile Heart	Idea Factory International	
January 27	Caladrius 2/Dark Element	WIN, NS, PS5	Original	Shoot 'em up	MOSS	H2 Interactive	
January 27	Hollow Home	WIN, XBO, XBX/S	Original	RPG, Survival	Twigames	Crunchy Leaf Games	
January 27	Prison Of Husks	WIN, PS5	Original	Soulslike	Glass Head Dolls	Glass Head Dolls, WINGS	
January 28	Earth Defense Force 6	NS2	Port	TPS	Sandlot	D3 Publisher	
January 28	Fate/Extra Record	WIN, NS, NS2, PS4, PS5	Remake	RPG	Type-Moon Studio BB, Meteorise	Aniplex	
January 28	Gal Guardians: Servants of the Dark	NS2	Port	Metroidvania, Action-adventure	Inti Creates		
January 28	Karous: The Blur of Re:venant – New Order (JP)	NS, PS4, PS5	Remake	Scrolling shooter (vertical)	RS34		
January 28	Kimiiro Patra IF (JP)	WIN, NS, PS5	Original	Visual novel	Entergram		
January 28	Metroid Ravenous	NS2	Original	Action-adventure	MercurySteam, Nintendo EPD	Nintendo	
January 28	RPG Maker U2U	WIN	Original	RPG	Gotcha Gotcha Games		
January 28	Taito Milestones 5 (JP)	NS	Compilation	Shoot 'em up	Hamster Corporation	Taito	
January 28	Tropico 7	WIN, NS2, PS5, XBX/S	Original	CMS, Government sim	Gaming Minds Studios	Kalypso Media	
January 28	Until Dawn 2	PS5	Original	Interactive film, Survival horror	Firesprite	Sony Interactive Entertainment	
January 28	Warhammer 40,000: Dark Heresy	WIN, PS5, XBX/S	Original	RPG	Owlcat Games		
January 28	Witchbrook	WIN, NS, NS2, PS5, XBX/S	Original	Life sim, RPG	Chucklefish		
January	Rockbeasts	WIN, PS5, NS, XBX/S	Original	RPG	Lichthund	Critical Role	
January	Slime Rancher 2	NS2	Port	Life sim	Monomi Park		
February 2	Elta: Defy All Gods	WIN, PS5, XBX/S	Original	Action, Platformer	Afterburner Studios	Focus Entertainment	
February 4	He-Man and the Masters of the Universe: Dragon Pearl of Destruction	WIN, NS, PS4, PS5, XBO, XBX/S	Original	Brawler	Bitmap Bureau	Limited Run Games	
February 4	Metro 2039	WIN, PS5, XBX/S	Original	FPS	4A Games	Deep Silver	
February 4	Muramasa: Revenant Blades	WIN, NS, NS2, PS5	Remaster	Action RPG	Vanillaware	Marvelous Entertainment	
February 4	Romancing SaGa 3: Destinies United	WIN, NS, NS2, PS5, XBX/S	Remake	RPG	Square Enix		
February 5	Sagas of Lumin	WIN	Original	Action-adventure, RPG	Elos Games And Arts	GameDev.ist	
February 8	Outward 2	WIN	Early access	RPG	Nine Dots Studio	Nine Dots Publishing	
February 11	Astonishia Story (WW)	WIN, NS, NS2, PS5	Remake	RPG	Netmarble Neo, Waycoder	NIS America	
February 11	Spyder: Agent 8	WIN, NS, NS2, PS5, XBX/S	Original	Adventure, Stealth	Sumo Digital	PQube	
February 12	Tomb Raider: Legacy of Atlantis	WIN, NS2, PS5, XBX/S	Remake	Action-adventure	Crystal Dynamics, Flying Wild Hog	Amazon Game Studios	
February 16	Yu-Gi-Oh! Tag Force GX	WIN, NS, NS2	Remake	DCCG, RPG	Matrix Software	Konami	
February 17	Among Us Story: On Guard	WIN, OSX, NS2, iOS, DROID	Original	Adventure	Innersloth		
February 18	Mr. Magpie's Harmless Card Game	WIN, NS2, PS5, XBX/S	Original	Deck building, Horror	Giant Light Studios	Behaviour Interactive, Gambit Digital	
February 18	Persona 4 Revival	WIN, PS5, XBX/S	Remake	RPG, Social sim	P-Studio	Atlus	
February 18	Psikyo Memories	NS2, PS5	Compilation	Shoot 'em up	Edia		
February 19	The Road of Dust and Sorrow	WIN, NS, NS2, PS5, XBX/S	Original	Adventure, Survival horror	Painted Black Games	Silver Lining Interactive	
February 22	Tales of Tuscany	WIN, NS, PS5, XBX/S, iOS, DROID	Original	RPG	Nico Papalia	Top Hat Studios	
February 23	Fable	WIN, PS5, XBX/S	Original	Action RPG	Playground Games	Xbox Game Studios	
February 23	Final Fantasy XIV: Evercold	WIN, OSX, NS2, PS4, PS5, XBX/S	Expansion	MMORPG	Square Enix		
February 25	Atelier Karia: The Night Kingdom & the Guide of Memories	WIN, NS2, PS5, XBX/S	Original	RPG	Gust	Koei Tecmo	
February 25	Demon Kill Demon: Yomi 1984 (JP)	WIN, PS4, PS5	Port	RPG	Experience		
February 25	Hyrule Warriors: Age of Calamity – Definitive Edition	NS2	Remaster	Hack and slash	Omega Force	Nintendo: JP: Koei Tecmo	
February 25	Seeker Eye (JP)	NS, NS2, PS5	Original	Horror, Visual novel	Mages		
February 25	Ys VIII: Lacrimosa of Dana	NS2	Port	Action RPG	Nihon Falcom	NIS America	
February	Calame	WIN, PS5, XBX/S	Original	Tactical RPG	Nextale Games		
February	Demi and the Fractured Dream	WIN, NS, NS2, PS5, XBX/S	Original	Action-adventure	Yarn Owl	Annapurna Interactive	
February	Konosuba: Prosperity to This Beloved Town! (JP)	WIN, iOS, DROID	Original	RPG	Kadokawa Corporation		
March 1	Meg’s Monster	PS5	Port	Adventure, RPG	Odencat		
March 4	Eternal Anima	WIN, NS2, PS5, XBX/S	Original	RPG	Marvelous		
March 4	Next: The Portopia Serial Murder Case (JP)	WIN, NS, NS2	Remake	Adventure	G-Mode, room6	G-Mode	
March 4	Shin-chan: Me and the Professor on Summer Vacation	NS2	Port	Adventure	Millennium Kitchen	Neos	
March 4	Shin-chan: Shiro and the Coal Town	NS2	Port	Adventure	Millennium Kitchen	Neos	
March 4	Trine 6: Together in Time	WIN, NS, NS2, PS5, XBX/S	Original	Puzzle-platformer	Frozenbyte	Cooldown Games	
March 4	Wo Long 2: Wings of Ember	WIN, NS2, PS5, XBX/S	Original	Action RPG, Hack and slash	Team Ninja	Koei Tecmo	
March 5	Gundam Rogue Orbit	WIN, PS5, XBX/S	Original	Action-adventure	Bandai Namco Studios	Bandai Namco Entertainment	
March 8	Petal Runner	WIN, NS2	Original	RPG	Nano Park Studios	iam8bit	
March 9	Grave Seasons	WIN, NS, PS5, XBX/S	Original	Farming, Horror	Perfect Garbage	Blumhouse Games	
March 10	Shadow of the Road	WIN	Original	RPG	Another Angle Games	Owlcat Games	
March 10	Trainwatch	WIN	Original	Adventure	Harvester Games	11 bit studios	
March 11	My Arms Are Longer Now	WIN, NS, NS2, PS4, PS5, XBX/S	Original	Adventure, Stealth	Toot Games	Jackbox Games	
March 11	Road Kings	WIN, PS5, XBX/S	Original	Vehicle sim	Saber Interactive	Focus Entertainment	
March 18	007 First Light	NS2	Port	Action-adventure	IO Interactive		
March 18	The Apothecary Diaries: The False Imperial Brother	WIN, NS, NS2, PS5	Original	Adventure	Gust	Koei Tecmo	
March 18	Earth Defense Force 6.2: Invaders from Another World (JP)	PS5	Remaster	TPS	Sandlot	D3 Publisher	
March 18	Senxin Aleste (JP)	NS, PS4, PS5	Port	Scrolling shooter (vertical)	M2		
March 25	Baptiste	WIN, NS2, PS5, XBX/S	Original	Horror (psych)	Digital Dreams, Firenut Games	Firenut Games	
March 25	Girls und Panzer: All-Star Tank Carnival (JP)	WIN, NS2, PS5	Original	Action	D3 Publisher		
March 25	Renai, Hajimemashite (JP)	NS, PS4, PS5	Port	Visual novel	ASa-Project	AirVelocity	
March 25	ReVamp	WIN	Original	Rougelike, Tower defense	Digital Sun		
March 25	Saihate Station: Twilight Edition	NS	Port	Adventure, Horror	viv	Playism	
March 25	Super Battle Golf	NS2, PS5, XBX/S	Port	Sports (golf)	Brimstone	Oro Interactive	
March	Cassette Beasts 2002	WIN, LIN, NS2, PS5, XBX/S	Original	RPG	Bytten Studio	Raw Fury	
March	Croak	WIN, XBX/S	Original	Platformer	WoodRunner Games		
March	Dumpster Gang	NS2, PS5, XBX/S	Port	Sandbox	Coyote House Games	Curve Games	
March	Forge of the Fae	WIN, OSX, LIN, NS, PS4, PS5, XBO, XBX/S	Original	RPG	Datadyne	Deck13 Spotlight	
March	Into the Dead: Our Darkest Days	WIN, OSX, NS2, PS5, XBX/S	Full release	Survival	PikPok		
March	inZOI	WIN, OSX, PS5	Full release	Life sim	inZOI Studio	Krafton	
March	Join Us	WIN, PS5, XBX/S	Original	Survival	Wolf Haus Games		
March	Karous: The Blur of Re:venant – New Order (JP)	WIN	Port	Scrolling shooter (vertical)	RS34		
March	No Rest for the Wicked	WIN, PS5	Full release	Action RPG	Moon Studios		

=== April–June ===
Release date	Title	Platform(s)	Type(s)	Genre(s)	Developer(s)	Publisher(s)	Ref.
April 7	Exodus	WIN, PS5, XBX/S	Original	Action-adventure, RPG	Archetype Entertainment	Wizards of the Coast	
April 8	Final Fantasy VII Revelation	WIN, NS2, PS5, XBX/S	Remake	Action RPG	Square Enix		
April 15	PSYCHO DEAD	WIN, PS5	Original	Survival horror	MOON CATALYST		
April 20	Stronghold 4	WIN	Early access	RTS	Firefly Studios		
April 22	Melty Blood: Twi-Lumina	WIN, NS, NS2, PS4, PS5, XBO	Remaster	Fighting	French-Bread	Aniplex	
April 27	Mariachi Legends	WIN, NS, PS5, XBX/S	Original	Metroidvania	Halberd Studios		
April 27	Pony Island 2: Panda Circus	WIN	Original	Action-adventure	Daniel Mullins Games		
May 13	The Grimm Reapress and the Drearytale Monster (WW)	WIN, NS, NS2, PS5	Original	Action-adventure	Nippon Ichi Software	Clouded Leopard Entertainment, Nippon Ichi Software	
May 20	God of War Laufey	PS5	Original	Action-adventure	Santa Monica Studio	Sony Interactive Entertainment	
May 20	Persona 4 Revival	NS2	Port	RPG, Social sim	P-Studio	Atlus	
May	Guild Saga: Vanished Worlds	WIN, PS5	Full release	RPG, TBS	Ocelot Technologies		
May	Haunted Paws	WIN, NS, NS2, PS4, PS5, XBX/S	Original	Cozy, Horror	Lazy Flock		
June 30	Rustown	WIN, XBX/S	Original	Stealth, Adventure	Plotrick		

=== October–December ===
Release date	Title	Platform(s)	Type(s)	Genre(s)	Developer(s)	Publisher(s)	Ref.
November	Canyons	WIN, PS5, XBX/S	Original	Extraction shooter, TPS	RedRuins Softworks	HypeTrain Digital	

=== Unscheduled releases ===
Title	Approximate date (Note: The calendar year is divided into four quarters, often abbreviated Q1 (January to March), Q2 (April to June), Q3 (July to September) and Q4 (October to December).)	Platform(s)	Type(s)	Genre(s)	Developer(s)	Publisher(s)	Ref.
171	Unknown	WIN, NS, PS4, PS5, XBO, XBX/S	Full release	Action-adventure	Betagames Group	Betagames Group, QUByte Interactive (Consoles)	
Acorn: Seed of Resistance	Unknown	WIN	Original	Auto battler, RPG, Roguelike	Guidelight Games	Ghost Ship Publishing	
Acornia: Mirror Worlds	Q1/Q2	WIN, NS2, PS5, XBX/S	Original	Action-adventure, CMS	Splashteam	The Arcade Crew	
Acts of Blood	Unknown	PS5, XBX/S	Port	Brawler, Action	Eksil Team	Big Fan Games	
AfterZero: The Last Drive	Unknown	WIN, PS5, XBX/S	Original	Adventure, Survival	3DClouds		
Age Twisters	Unknown	WIN, NS2, PS5, XBX/S	Original	Adventure	Piccolo Studio	Krafton	
Akatori	Unknown	NS2	Port	Metroidvania	Contrast Games	Games Harbor, Esprit Games	
Alien Deathstorm	Q1/Q2	WIN, PS5, XBX/S	Original	Horror, FPS	Rebellion Developments		
All Army Attack	Unknown	WIN	Original	Rouglike	BlackLight Games	Devolver Digital	
Aloft	Q1/Q2	WIN, PS5	Full release	Survival, Sandbox	Astrolabe Interactive	Funcom	
Angelian Trigger (JP)	Unknown	PS5	Port	Shoot 'em up	PiXEL		
Anima: Song from the Abyss	Unknown	WIN, PS5, XBX/S	Original	Action RPG	Anima Project		
Arcane Eats	Unknown	WIN	Original	Deck building	Wonderbelly Games	Skystone Games	
ArcheAge S: Strait of Freedom	Unknown	WIN	Original	MMORPG	XL Games	Kakao Games	
Arma 4	Unknown	Unknown	Original	FPS	Bohemia Interactive		
Artius: Pure Imagination	Q1	WIN, LIN	Original	Action, Platformer	PVic Games	IndieArk	
Ascenders: Beyond the Peak	Q1/Q2	WIN	Early access	Roguelite	Ludogram	Twin Sails Interactive	
Assetto Corsa Rally	Unknown	WIN	Full release	Racing (sim)	Kunos Simulazioni, Supernova Games Studios	505 Games	
Astrae Oratio	Unknown	iOS, DROID	Original	RPG	Dynamis One	NC	
At Fate's End	Unknown	WIN, OSX, LIN, PS5, XBX/S	Original	Action-adventure	Thunder Lotus Games		
Attack Only	Unknown	WIN	Original	RPG	Heaviside Creations		
Ayakashi Fishing Folktails (WW)	Q2/Q3	NS, NS2	Original	Action	Toybox	Natsume Inc.	
Azur Promilia (WW)	Q2/Q3	WIN, PS5, iOS, DROID	Early access, Port	Action RPG	Manjuu		
The Backworld	Q2	WIN	Original	TBS, RPG	Numor Games	Top Hat Studios	
Bad Magpie	Unknown	WIN, OSX, XBX/S	Original	Narrative adventure	Milktooth		
Bakudo	Unknown	WIN, NS2	Original	Action	Sayil Games	Shueisha Games	
Bathory: Heritage of Blood	Unknown	WIN, NS	Original	Metroidvania, Soulslike	Moonana		
Beastieball	Q1/Q2	WIN, OSX	Full release	Monster tamer, Sports	Wishes Unlimited	Klei Entertainment	
Beaten Path	Unknown	WIN, NS, PS5, XBX/S	Original	Tactical RPG	Peacebreak Studio	Wales Interactive	
Becrowned	Q1	WIN, NS2, PS5, XBX/S	Original	Survival, Horror (Psych)	13th Street Games	Top Hat Studios	
Blighted	Unknown	WIN, NS2	Original	Metroidvania, Action RPG	Drinkbox Studios		
Bloodstained: The Scarlet Engagement	Unknown	WIN, PS5, XBX/S	Original	Metroidvania, Action RPG	ArtPlay	505 Games	
Bloody Hell Hotel	Unknown	WIN	Original	Simulation	Unfold Games	Unfold Games, Gambit Digital	
B.L.U.E. NOVA	Unknown	WIN	Original	TPS	GungHo Online Entertainment		
The Boba Teashop: Refill	Unknown	WIN, PS5, XBX/S	Original	Horror (psych)	Serafini Productions, Mike Ten	Serafini Productions	
BrokenLore: Miki-Chan	Unknown	WIN, NS2, PS5, XBX/S	Original	Horror (psych)	Serafini Productions	Serafini Productions, Soft Source Publishing	
Burn-9	Unknown	WIN, OSX, LIN	Original	Adventure	14 Hours Productions	Fellow Traveller	
Cairn	Q1/Q2	NS2	Port	Adventure	The Game Bakers		
Castaway Diary: Portal to the Unknown Isles	Unknown	WIN	Early access	Survival	REMIMORY		
Chronicles: Medieval	Q1/Q2	WIN	Early access	Action, Sandbox	Raw Power Games		
Chrono Odyssey	Unknown	WIN, PS5, XBX/S	Original	MMORPG	Chrono Studio	Kakao Games	
Chronoscript: The Endless End	Q2	WIN, PS5, XBX/S	Original	Action-adventure, Metroidvania	DeskWorks	Shueisha Games	
City of None	Unknown	WIN, LIN	Original	Platformer, Adventure	Extremely OK Games		
Civilization VII: Earthrise	Unknown	WIN, OSX, LIN, NS, NS2, PS4, PS5, XBO, XBX/S, iOS, tvOS	Expansion	4X, TBS	Firaxis Games	2K	
Clockfall	Unknown	WIN, PS5, XBX/S	Full release	Roguelike, Action RPG	Rever Games	Radical Theory	
Clockwork Revolution	Unknown	WIN, XBX/S	Original	Action RPG	inXile Entertainment	Xbox Game Studios	
Clutch	Q1/Q2	WIN, PS5, XBX/S	Original	Action, Racing	Maverick Games	Focus Entertainment	
Cometrox!	Q1	WIN	Original	Rhythm	piebuster	piebuster	
Company of Heroes: Definitive Edition	Q1/Q2	WIN	Remaster	RTS	Blackbird Interactive, Relic Entertainment	Relic Entertainment	
Conan: The Black Pyramid	Unknown	WIN	Original	Action RPG, Rougelite	Games Farm	Grindstone	
CONQ: Crown Of No Quarter	Unknown	WIN, PS5	Original	Action-adventure	Athena Games		
Conquista: Tide of Wills	Q2/Q3	WIN	Original	4X, CMS	MicroSimulation	Shueisha Games	
Contact Protocol	Q1/Q2	WIN, NS2, PS5, XBX/S	Original	Simulation	Cold Zephyr Games	Kinetic Publishing	
Craftopia	Unknown	WIN, XBX/S	Full release	Survival, Sandbox	Pocketpair		
Crazy Taxi: World Tour	Unknown	WIN, NS2, PS5, XBX/S	Original	Racing	Sega		
Cresata	Unknown	WIN, PS5, XBX/S	Original	Action, Platformer	Rocket Panda Games, Shatter Flask Syndicate		
Crescent County	Q2/Q3	WIN, LIN, NS2, PS5, XBX/S	Original	Adventure	Electric Saint	Kinetic Publishing	
Cutout	Unknown	WIN	Original	Action, Horror	906 Games	Big Blue Sky Games	
Cytus II	Unknown	NS, NS2	Port	Rhythm	Rayark, Esquadra	Flyhigh Works	
Daba: Land of Water Scar	Q1/Q2	PS5	Original	Action RPG	DarkStar Games	Sony Interactive Entertainment	
DCKO	Unknown	iOS, DROID	Original	Fighting	Drop Fake	Drop Fake, Warner Bros. Games	
Decapolice	Unknown	WIN, NS2, PS5	Original	RPG	Level-5		
Deltarune: Chapter 6	Unknown	WIN, OSX, NS, NS2, PS4, PS5	Episode	RPG, Adventure	Toby Fox, 8-4 (Consoles)		
The Detective Is Already Dead (JP)	Unknown	NS	Original	Adventure	Taito		
The Detectorist Guild	Q1/Q2	WIN, NS, PS5, XBX/S	Original	RPG	Full Stop Studios	PQube	
Digimon Story: Time Stranger – A Hero's Eternal Legacy	Unknown	WIN, NS, NS2, PS5, XBX/S	Expansion	RPG	Media.Vision	Bandai Namco Entertainment	
Dokapon Kingdom: Connect 2	Q2/Q3	WIN, NS, NS2	Original	Party	Compile Heart	Idea Factory International	
Dragon Ball Xenoverse 3	Unknown	WIN, PS5, XBX/S	Original	Action RPG, Fighting	Dimps	Bandai Namco Entertainment	
Dragon Quest RPG: The Cursed Tree and the Chosen Isle	Unknown	DROID, iOS	Original	RPG, TBS	WFS	Square Enix	
Dragon Slayer: The Legend of Heroes I & II	Unknown	WIN, NS, PS4, PS5	Compilation	RPG	Edia		
Drova II: Torn Lands	Unknown	WIN, NS, PS4, PS5, XBO, XBX/S	Original	Action RPG	Just2D	Deck13 Spotlight	
Dungeon Lurker	Q1	WIN	Original	Dungeon crawl, Roguelike	13AM Games		
Dungeons & Dragons: Long Rest Tavern	Q1/Q2	WIN	Original	CMS	Homo Ludens	Dotemu	
The Duskbloods	Unknown	NS2	Original	Action	FromSoftware	JP: FromSoftware; WW: Nintendo	
Duskers 2.0	Q3/Q4	WIN	Early access	Strategy	Misfits Attic		
Dust: Origins	Q1/Q2	WIN	Original	Action	Airship Syndicate		
Dust till Dawn	Unknown	WIN	Original	Adventure, Cozy	Mac n Cheese Games		
El Paso, Elsewhere 2	Unknown	WIN, XBX/S	Original	TPS	Strange Scaffold		
The Eminence in Shadow: Phantom Echoes	Unknown	WIN, NS2, PS5	Original	Action, Roguelite	Aiming, Team Caravan	JP: Aiming; AS: Clouded Leopard Entertainment; WW: NIS America	
Encryption	Unknown	WIN	Original	Horror (psych)	Digital Lighthouse Games		
The End of History	Q1	WIN, PS5, XBX/S	Full release	Sandbox, Tactical RPG	Tatamibeya	WorldMap	
Endurance Motorsport Series	Q1/Q2	WIN, PS5, XBX/S	Original	Racing (sim)	KT Racing	Nacon	
Enshrouded	Q1/Q2	XBX/S	Port	Survival, Action RPG	Keen Games		
The Escapists 3	Unknown	WIN, NS2, PS5, XBX/S	Original	Tactical RPG	Team17		
Everbloom	Q1/Q2	WIN, NS2	Original	Life sim	Torbie	Fictions	
The Expanse: Osiris Reborn	Q2	WIN, PS5, XBX/S	Original	Action RPG, TPS	Owlcat Games		
Exterminauts	Unknown	WIN, PS5, XBX/S	Original	TPS	Behaviour Interactive	Level Infinite	
Fallen Tear: The Ascension	Unknown	NS, PS5, XBX/S	Port	Metroidvania	Winter Crew	CMD Studios	
Family Time	Q1	WIN	Original	Adventure, Life sim	sgthale		
Far Cry 3 Classic Edition	Q1/Q2	NS2	Port	FPS	Ubisoft Montreal	Ubisoft	
Far Cry 3: Blood Dragon Classic Edition	Q1/Q2	NS2	Port	FPS	Ubisoft Montreal	Ubisoft	
Faraday Blues	Unknown	WIN, PS5, XBX/S	Original	DCCG, Strategy, Visual novel	Serenity Forge		
Finding Polka	Q1/Q2	NS	Port	Adventure	lidlocks	Parco Games	
Flesh & Wire	Unknown	WIN, PS5	Original	FPS, Horror (psych)	Running With Scissors		
Floor Plan: Slap Out Of It!	Q1/Q2	WIN, OSX, NS, NS2	Original	Adventure, Puzzle	Turbo Button		
The Free Shepherd	Unknown	WIN, PS5	Original	Adventure	Frame Interactive		
Frostpunk 1886	Unknown	WIN	Remake	City builder, Survival	11 Bit Studios		
Full Belly Breakout	Unknown	WIN	Original	Adventure	Zxima	Playism	
Gachiakuta: Breakout	Unknown	WIN, PS5, XBX/S	Original	Survival, Action RPG	Com2uS		
Game of Thrones: War for Westeros	Unknown	WIN	Original	RTS	PlaySide Studios		
Genokids	Unknown	WIN, OSX, LIN	Full release	Hack and slash, Action	Nukefist		
Girls' Frontline: The Lunasia Covenant	Unknown	DROID, iOS	Original	TPS	Sunborn Network Technology, Hecate Team	Sunborn Network Technology	
Girls und Panzer Hakunetsu! Mahjong Tag Battle Desu! (JP)	Unknown	NS2, PS5	Original	Digital tabletop	Mages		
Gobble (WW)	Unknown	WIN, NS, NS2, PS5	Original	Action	Nippon Ichi Software	NIS America	
Goblin Cleanup	Unknown	WIN, NS2, PS5, XBX/S	Full release	Simulation	Crisalu Games	Team17	
The God Slayer	Unknown	WIN, PS5, XBX/S	Original	Action RPG	Pathea Games		
Gods With Badges	Unknown	WIN	Original	Strategy	Strange Scaffold		
Goodbye Seoul	Q1/Q2	WIN	Original	Adventure, Puzzle	JINO Games	Neowiz	
Gravity Circuit 2	Q1/Q2	WIN, NS, NS2, PS5	Original	Action, Platformer	Domesticated Ant Games	Dear Villagers	
Graytail	Q4	WIN, XBX/S	Original	Action-adventure	Concode		
Greak 2: Alliance of the Storms	Unknown	WIN, NS, PS5, XBX/S	Original	Metroidvania	Navegante	Team17	
Great Northern	Q1/Q2	WIN, OSX, NS, PS4, PS5, XBX/S, iOS, DROID	Original	Interactive film	Little Wooden Toys		
The Grimm Reapress and the Drearytale Monster (WW)	Unknown	WIN, NS, NS2, PS5	Original	Adventure	Nippon Ichi Software	NIS America	
Gunvolt Chronicles: Luminous Avenger iX 3	Unknown	WIN, NS2	Original	Action, Platformer	Inti Creates		
HAEX	Unknown	WIN	Early access	FPS, Survival	Dead Astronauts		
Hakuoki Memoirs: Drifting Clouds (WW)	Q1/Q2	NS	Original	Otome, Visual novel	Idea Factory	Idea Factory, Otomate, Eastasiasoft	
Hatsune Miku: Starry Party	Unknown	WIN, NS2	Original	Party	Good Smile Company	Crypton Future Media	
HellHeart Breaker	Q1	WIN	Original	Action, Roguelike, Dating sim	BattleBrew Productions		
Hello Sunshine	Unknown	WIN	Original	Survival, RPG	Red Thread Games	Megabit Publishing	
Heroes of Might and Magic III Remake	Unknown	WIN, PS5, XBX/S	Remake	TBS	Ubisoft		
Hexplorando	Unknown	WIN, NS	Original	Puzzle, Sandbox	Hexplora Interactive	Maximum Entertainment	
Higurashi no Naku Koro ni Jong Remaster (JP)	Unknown	WIN, NS, PS5	Remaster	Adventure, Digital tabletop	City Connection		
Hitman Classic Trilogy Remastered (Note: Includes the remastered versions of Hitman: Codename 47, Hitman 2: Silent Assassin, and Hitman: Contracts.)	Unknown	WIN, PS5, XBX/S	Remaster, Compilation	Action, Stealth	Saber Interactive	Saber Interactive, IO Interactive	
Hoarder	Unknown	WIN, PS5, XBX/S	Original	Horror (psych)	Byzel	Awaken Realms	
Hollywood Hustle: A Prop Collector Simulator	Unknown	WIN	Original	Simulation	Woodpile	Maximum Entertainment	
Holstin	Unknown	WIN, NS, PS4, PS5, XBO, XBX/S	Original	Survival horror	Sonka	Team17	
Holy Horror Mansion	Unknown	WIN, NS2, PS5	Original	RPG	Level-5		
Homura Hime	Unknown	NS2, PS5	Port	Bullet hell, Action	Crimson Dusk	Playism	
Horizon Steel Frontiers	Q1/Q2	WIN, iOS, DROID	Original	MMO, RPG	NC		
Hoshin Engi Re:surrection	Unknown	WIN, NS2, PS5	Original	Action, Roguelite	Lastwonder	Shueisha Games	
Hounded	Unknown	WIN, PS5	Original	Adventure	IMPRNT STUDIOS	Silver Lining Studios	
Humankind 2	Unknown	WIN	Original	4X	Amplitude Studios		
Hunter: The Reckoning – Deathwish	Q2/Q3	WIN, PS5, XBX/S	Original	Action RPG	Teyon	Nacon	
Hyperdrop: A Pachinko Roguelite	Unknown	WIN, LIN	Original	Roguelite	Dark Dark Goose	Devolver Digital	
Hyperspace Neptunia: Unlimited (WW)	Unknown	WIN, NS, NS2, PS4, PS5	Original	RPG	Compile Heart	Compile Heart, Idea Factory International	
HYPERyuki: Snowboard Syndicate	Q1	WIN, NS2, PS5, XBX/S	Original	Sports (snowboarding)	Wabisabi Games	Acclaim, Inc.	
Idol Manager: Virtual Venture	Unknown	WIN, OSX	Early access	Business sim, Visual novel	Glitch Pitch	Playism	
Ill	Unknown	WIN, PS5, XBX/S	Original	Survival horror	Team Clout	Mundfish Powerhouse	
Illusion of Itehari: trail (WW)	Unknown	NS	Original	Otome, Visual novel	LicoBiTs	Broccoli, Aksys Games	
Infinite Alliance	Unknown	WIN, NS, NS2, PS4, PS5, XBO, XBX/S	Original	RPG	Critical Games	Electric Airship	
Intergalactic: The Heretic Prophet	Q2/Q3	PS5	Original	Action-adventure	Naughty Dog	Sony Interactive Entertainment	
isekizima: Ruins and Tails Journey	Unknown	NS	Port	Action, Platformer	TamagawaSoft		
Is It Wrong to Try to Pick Up Girls in a Dungeon? Frontier Zero	Unknown	WIN, iOS, DROID	Original	Unknown	enish, Inc.		
Itachi: Haunted Abodes – Wandering Through 2000s Tokyo Culture	Unknown	WIN	Original	Adventure	room6		
Jay and Silent Bob's Joint Venture	Unknown	WIN	Original	Farming	Starworks Studios	Nitrate Games	
Jiaohun	Unknown	WIN, PS5	Original	Horror (psych)	12AM Blackout		
Jujutsu Kaisen Rumble: Survivaton	Unknown	WIN, NS2, PS5, XBX/S	Original	Bullet heaven	poncle	Shueisha Games	
Kaguya	Unknown	WIN	Original	Bullet hell, Shoot 'em up	Flypot.LLC	AMATA Games	
Keelblade	Unknown	WIN	Original	Action RPG	Digital Confectioners		
Kemuri	Unknown	WIN, PS5	Original	Action	Unseen		
Kena: Scars of Kosmora	Unknown	WIN, PS5	Original	Action-adventure	Ember Lab	Sony Interactive Entertainment	
Kidbash: Super Legend	Q1/Q2	WIN, PS4, PS5, XBO, XBX/S	Original	Platformer, Roguelike	Authentic Remixes, Fat Raccoon	Acclaim, Inc.	
Kingdom III: Rising Realms	Unknown	WIN, NS2, PS5, XBX/S	Original	Strategy	Fury Studios	Raw Fury	
Kingdom Come: Deliverance II Royal Edition	Unknown	NS2	Port	Action RPG	Warhorse Studios	Deep Silver	
Kingdom Hearts IV	Q3/Q4	WIN, NS2, PS5, XBX/S	Original	Action RPG	Square Enix		
Kirby and the World Beyond	Q1/Q2	NS2	Original	Adventure	HAL Laboratory	Nintendo	
Knock Off: The Battle for Imagination	Q2	WIN, PS5 XBX/S	Original	Fighting	Mechaghidora	Bit Bot Media	
Kumarn: The Wandering Spirit	Unknown	WIN	Original	Adventure, Horror	WereBuff Studio	Wired Productions	
Ladder Lad	Unknown	WIN, OSX, NS	Original	Platformer	Antfood, BUCK Games	BUCK Games	
Laica	Q1/Q2	WIN	Original	Survival horror	Santa Studio	ambr	
Lair of the Leviathan	Unknown	WIN, NS, PS4, PS5, XBO, XBX/S	Original	RPG	Nostalgic Realms, Whiskeybarrel Studios	Deck13 Spotlight	
The Last Hour of an Epic TO THE MOON RPG	Unknown	WIN	Original	Adventure	Freebird Games		
Lazare's Sacrifice	Unknown	WIN	Original	Deck building	Dream Reality Interactive	Curve Games	
The Lift	Unknown	WIN, PS5, XBX/S	Original	Simulation	Fantastic Signals	tinyBuild	
LitGirls: Bookbound Dungeons	Q1/Q2	WIN	Original	Dungeon crawl, RPG	Nanairo Enterprise	Dangen Entertainment	
Little Prince Tyger	Unknown	WIN	Original	Action, Roguelike	Saltitude	Team17	
Lollipop Chainsaw 2 Back2Back	Unknown	PS5	Original	Action-adventure, Hack and slash	JP Universe	Dragami Games, Nada Holdings	
Long Gone	Unknown	WIN, OSX	Original	Narrative adventure, Survival	Hillfort Games	Hillfort Games, Outersloth	
Lords of the Fallen II	Q1	WIN, NS2, PS5, XBX/S	Original	Action RPG	Hexworks	CI Games	
Lost and Found Co.	Q1/Q2	NS, NS2	Port	Hidden object, Adventure	Bit Egg		
Lost Museum: Echoes of the Chromageists	Q2	WIN, NS2	Original	Adventure	Happinet, Wit One	Happinet	
The Lost Wild	Unknown	WIN, PS5	Original	Survival horror	Great Ape Games	Annapurna Interactive	
Lufia I & II: The Sinistrals Saga	Unknown	WIN, NS, NS2, PS5	Compilation	RPG	Taito	JP: Taito; WW: Clear River Games	
Magenta Down	Unknown	WIN, XBX/S	Original	Adventure	2 Ton Studios		
Magicians: The Devil's Deal	Unknown	WIN, PS5, XBX/S	Original	FPS	Uppercut Games	Focus Entertainment	
Mana Alchemy	Unknown	WIN	Original	Bullet heaven, RPG	Metasla		
Maneater 2	Unknown	WIN, NS2, PS5, XBX/S	Original	Action RPG	Demiurge Studios, Tripwire Interactive	Tripwire Interactive	
Marked for Mayhem	Unknown	WIN	Original	Action	Bladework Games		
Marvel 1943: Rise of Hydra	Unknown	Unknown	Original	Action-adventure	Paramount Games Studio	Plaion	
Mega Man: Dual Override	Q1/Q2	WIN, NS, NS2, PS4, PS5, XBO, XBX/S	Original	Platformer	Capcom		
MegaGum	Q1/Q2	WIN	Original	Platformer	N-Zone	N-Zone Productions	
Memoria Wake	Q1/Q2	WIN, XBX/S	Original	Action-adventure, Soulslike	Team Crescendo		
Mercenaries Grace: Black Feather and the Golden Right Arm (JP)	Q1/Q2	WIN	Port	Tactical RPG	RideonJapan		
Metal Slug Ultimate Collection	Unknown	WIN, NS, NS2, PS5, XBX/S	Compilation	Run and gun	SNK Corporation		
Militsioner	Unknown	WIN, XBX/S	Original	Immersive sim	TallBoys	Critical Reflex	
Mononoke no Kuni	Unknown	WIN	Original	Action RPG, Adventure	Lights-Interactive	Happinet	
Monster Hunter Wilds: Ascendance	Unknown	WIN, NS2, PS5, XBX/S	Expansion	Action RPG	Capcom		
MoonHack	Unknown	WIN	Original	Visual novel	ASTRA		
Moosa: Dirty Fate	Unknown	WIN, PS5, XBX/S	Original	Action	Studio IGGYMOB		
Moshi Monsters	Unknown	MOBI	Port	Virtual pet	Mind Candy		
Murals	Unknown	WIN	Original	Action-adventure	Dlala Studios		
Muv-Luv: Tactics – Kalidasa at Nightmare	Unknown	WIN	Original	Tactical RPG	Fuzz	aNCHOR	
My Cannibal Family	Unknown	WIN, PS5, XBX/S	Original	Horror, Simulation	Wolf & Wood	Raw Fury	
My Time at Evershine	Unknown	WIN, NS2, PS5, XBX/S	Original	Life sim, RPG	Pathea Games		
N Plus Infinity Times Two	Unknown	WIN, LIN, NS2, PS5, XBX/S	Original	Platformer	Metanet Software		
Nautus	Unknown	WIN	Early access	Adventure	Magic Design Studios	Arc Games	
Navinosuke: The Yo-kai Buster	Unknown	WIN, NS	Original	RPG	Kohachi Studio	Happinet	
Neosphere of the Deep-Blue Sky: Legacy (JP)	Q1/Q2	WIN, NS	Remaster	City builder	Kogado Studio		
Netcode Warriors	Unknown	WIN, PS5	Original	Fighting	Son Studios		
Neverway	Unknown	WIN, OSX, LIN, NS	Original	Horror, Life sim, RPG	Coldblood Inc.	Coldblood Inc., Outersloth	
NightRunner	Unknown	WIN, LIN	Original	Extraction shooter, Survival	314 Arts		
Ninja JaJaMaru: Yokai Night Parade	Unknown	WIN, NS2, PS5	Original	Action RPG, Hack and slash	City Connection		
Ninjala 2: The Uncharted Planet	Q1/Q2	NS2	Original	Action-adventure	GungHo Online Entertainment		
No Law	Unknown	WIN, PS5, XBX/S	Original	FPS, Action RPG	Neon Giant	Krafton	
No, I'm Not a Human	Unknown	NS, PS5, XBX/S	Port	Horror, Visual novel	Trioskaz	Critical Reflex	
Noroi Ayashi: The Infinith Oddity	Unknown	WIN, NS, NS2	Original	Action-adventure, Stealth, Horror	Clover Lab, SuperNiche	Game Source Entertainment	
Okko The Exiled	Q1/Q2	NS, PS4, PS5, XBO, XBX/S	Original	Action-adventure	Frozen Flame Interactive	Eastasiasoft	
Olympia Soirée: Catharsis (WW)	Unknown	NS	Original	Otome, Visual novel	Otomate	Idea Factory, Aksys Games	
Omega Phenex Commenced Project Six	Unknown	WIN	Original	Action	Surume Game Koubou	Astrolabe Games	
On Donuts and Holes	Unknown	WIN	Original	Adventure	Atsuki Miyamura, Kako no Nikomi	room6	
Ondeh Ondeh Kaya's Tasty Tale	Unknown	WIN, NS2, PS5, XBX/S	Original	Action-adventure, Puzzle	Metronomik	Bandai Namco Entertainment	
ONI Zero: Cross (JP)	Unknown	Unknown	Original	RPG	Mebius		
Ontos	Unknown	WIN, PS5, XBX/S	Original	Adventure	Frictional Games	Kepler Interactive	
Onyx: The Dark Grip	Unknown	NS2	Original	Horror	Bloober Team		
Over The Hill	Unknown	NS2, PS5, XBX/S	Port	Adventure	Funselektor Labs, Strelka Games	Funselektor Labs	
Paper Perjury	Unknown	NS, NS2, PS4, PS5, XBX/S	Port	Adventure, Visual novel	Paper Cat Games		
Pastry Panic!	Unknown	NS2	Port	Cooking	Megatent	Nicalis	
Penguin Colony	Unknown	NS2, PS5	Port	Narrative adventure	Origame Digital	Fellow Traveller	
Perceptum	Q1/Q2	WIN, PS5, XBX/S	Original	Horror (psych)	Duck Reaction	Perp Games	
Petit Planet	Unknown	NS2	Port	Life sim	miHoYo		
Phasmophobia	Unknown	WIN, NS2, PS5, XBX/S	Full release	Horror (psych)	Kinetic Games		
Phoenix Wright: Ace Attorney – Dual Destinies VR	Unknown	Quest, Meta VR Glasses	Port	Visual novel	AMATA Games		
Photo Roboto: A Timesnap Adventure	Unknown	WIN	Original	Adventure, Cozy	Monomyth Games		
Piggy One Super Spark	Q2	WIN, OSX	Original	Action	Hanabushi, hako life	room6	
Pikuniku 2	Unknown	WIN, NS2	Original	Adventure, Puzzle	Sectordub	Devolver Digital	
Pixel Washer	Unknown	WIN, NS, NS2	Full release	Simulation	Valadria	Acclaim, Inc.	
The Player Who Can't Level Up	Q1/Q2	WIN, NS2, PS5, XBX/S	Full release	Roguelike, Action	Tripearl Games		
Pocket Wheels	Q1/Q2	WIN, OSX, NS, PS4, PS5, XBO, XBX/S	Original	Platformer, Racing	Florian Wolf	Deck13 Spotlight	
Pokémon Winds and Waves	Unknown	NS2	Original	RPG, Adventure	Game Freak	JP: The Pokémon Company; WW: Nintendo	
Police Simulator	Unknown	WIN, PS5, XBX/S	Original	Simulation	Grip Studios	Astragon	
Postal 2 Redux	Q1	WIN, OSX, LIN, PS4, PS5, PSVR, Quest	Remake	FPS	Flat2VR Studios, Team Beef, Running With Scissors	Flat2VR Studios	
Postal 2 VR	Unknown	WIN, PSVR, Quest	Port	FPS	Flat2VR Studios, Team Beef, Running With Scissors	Flat2VR Studios	
PRIMA MATERIA	Unknown	WIN	Original	Visual novel	Radi Art	Synergia, Top Hat Studios	
Professor Layton and the Curious Village Remake	Unknown	WIN, NS, NS2, PS5	Remake	Adventure, Puzzle	Level-5		
Project Spirits	Unknown	WIN, MOBI	Original	Action RPG	Shift Up	Level Infinite	
Project TAL	Unknown	WIN, PS5	Original	Action RPG	MADNGINE	Wemade Max	
Prospice: Anomalous Logistics	Unknown	WIN, PS5, XBX/S	Original	Horror (psych), Simulation	Code Wakers	Forklift Interactive	
Psychic Force 2012	Unknown	WIN, NS, PS5	Port	Fighting	Taito	Cosmo Machia, Taito	
Putty World	Q2	NS2	Remake	Platformer	System 3		
PVKK	Unknown	WIN, OSX	Original	Puzzle	Bippinbits	Kepler Interactive	
Quiet Express: Cabin 909	Unknown	WIN	Original	Adventure	Kazuhide Oka, Studio 909	Studio 909	
Ragnarok Console Project	Q1/Q2	WIN, NS2, PS5, XBX/S	Original	RPG	Waycoder	Gravity, Daewon Media Game Lab	
Really Illegal Golf	Q1	WIN	Original	Sports (golf), Stealth	Pushlab Games	No More Robots	
Red Kiss	Unknown	WIN, XBX/S	Original	RPG	Wispfire	Fellow Traveller	
Remothered: Tormented Fathers Remastered	Q1	WIN, NS2, PS5, XBX/S	Remaster	Survival horror	Stormind Games		
Remothered: Broken Porcelain Remastered	Q1	WIN, NS2, PS5, XBX/S	Remaster	Survival horror	Stormind Games		
R.E.P.O.	Unknown	NS2	Port	Survival horror	Semiwork		
Resident Evil Veronica	Unknown	WIN, NS2, PS5, XBX/S	Remake	Survival horror	Capcom		
Rev. NOiR	Unknown	PS5	Original	RPG	ILCA, Konami Digital Entertainment	Konami Digital Entertainment	
Rise of the Spellbaker	Unknown	WIN, PS5, XBX/S	Original	Action-adventure	Realmforge Studios	Kalypso Media	
Rizz Dungeon: Skeleton Key to My Heart	Unknown	WIN, OSX, LIN	Original	Dungeon crawl	Snoozy Kazoo		
Road to Jukai	Unknown	WIN	Original	Horror (psych)	Endflame	tinyBuild	
Rogue Fortune	Unknown	WIN, NS2, PS5, XBX/S	Original	Action, Roguelite	Glowmade		
Rover's Tale	Unknown	WIN, NS2, PS5, XBX/S	Original	Metroidvania, Adventure	Observer Interactive		
Sa[meow]rai: Silverwing Stray	Q1	WIN	Original	Action-adventure	Gou Hong Studio	Gcores Publishing, Happinet	
Samurai Pizza Cats: Blast from the Past!	Unknown	WIN, consoles	Original	Action RPG	Blast Zero	Red Dunes Games	
Sayagatari: Promise of the Cursed Blade (WW)	Unknown	WIN	Original	Visual novel	Visual Arts Scripts	Visual Arts	
Sea of Remnants	Q1/Q2	WIN, PS5, XBX/S, iOS, DROID	Original	Adventure, RPG, Roguelike	Joker Studio	NetEase Games	
Sea Sniffers	Unknown	WIN	Original	Cozy	Blastmode, MP2 Games	Playism	
The Secret of Weepstone	Unknown	WIN	Original	Dungeon crawl	Talesworth Game Studio	DreadXP	
Senua	Unknown	WIN, PS5, XBX/S	Original	Action-adventure	Ninja Theory	Xbox Game Studios	
Shade of the Marionette: The Story of Piyorita	Q3/Q4	WIN, NS2, PS5, XBX/S	Original	Action RPG	Kiwi Walks		
Untitled Shantae game	Unknown	Unknown	Original	Platformer	WayForward		
Shenmue III Enhanced	Q1/Q2	WIN, NS2, PS5, XBX/S	Remaster	Action-adventure	YS Net	Inin Games	
Shironeko Project Infinity (JP)	Unknown	NS, NS2	Original	Action	Colopl		
Silent Planet - Elegy of a Dying World	Q2	WIN	Original	Metroidvania	Vertex Zero	Red Dunes Games	
The Sinking City 2	Unknown	NS2	Port	Survival horror	Frogwares		
Sker: The Bleeding Veil	Q1/Q2	WIN, PS5, XBX/S	Original	Survival horror	Stormind Games, Wales Interactive	Wales Interactive	
Slain 2: The Beast Within	Unknown	WIN, PS5, XBX/S	Original	Action, Platformer	Steel Mantis	Silver Lining Interactive	
Slap Out Of It!	Unknown	WIN, consoles	Original	Adventure, Puzzle	Turbo Button		
SlashZero	Q1/Q2	WIN, PS5	Original	Action, Platformer, Roguelike	Streetlamp Studio	Skystone Games	
Smalland II: Lost Realms	Unknown	WIN, PS5, XBX/S	Original	Survival	Maximum Entertainment		
Smersh: Wolfhound	Q2	WIN	Original	Stealth, TPS	Haggard Games		
Snack World: Reloaded	Unknown	WIN, NS2, PS5	Remake	Action RPG	Level-5		
Sol Shogunate	Unknown	WIN	Original	Action RPG	Chaos Manufacturing		
Son of Thanjai	Q1/Q2	WIN, PS5, XBX/S	Original	Action-adventure	Ayelet Studio		
Spine	Q2/Q3	WIN, PS5, XBX/S	Original	Action, Brawler	Nekki		
Spyro: A Realm Beyond	Q1/Q2	WIN, NS2, PS5, XBX/S	Original	Platformer	Toys for Bob	Activision	
Squad	Unknown	PS5, XBX/S	Port	FPS, Tactical shooter	Offworld Industries	Secret Mode	
Squadron 42	Q2	WIN	Original	Vehicular combat (spaceship), Action-adventure	Cloud Imperium Games		
Stage Fright	Unknown	WIN, NS, NS2	Original	Adventure	Ghost Town Games	Hello Games	
Star Trek: Shadow Frontier	Unknown	WIN, NS2, PS5, XBX/S	Original	Action-adventure, Survival horror	Bloober Team	Paramount Games Studio	
Stardust: Wish of Witch	Q1	NS2, PS5	Port	Tactical RPG	Kniv Studio	Silver Lining Interactive	
Starseeker: Astroneer Expeditions	Unknown	WIN, NS2, PS5, XBX/S	Full release	Adventure	System Era Softworks	Devolver Digital	
State of Decay 3	Unknown	WIN, PS5, XBX/S	Original	Survival	Undead Labs	Xbox Game Studios	
Story of Seasons: Your Wonderful Life	Q1/Q2	Quest, Meta VR Glasses	Original	Farming	Grounding Inc., Marvelous	Marvelous	
Sublustrum	Q1	WIN, consoles	Remake	Adventure	Phantomery Interactive	Brickwork Games	
Sugar Lies	Q1/Q2	NS	Port	Visual novel	Kogado Studio		
Sunkissed City	Unknown	WIN, OSX, LIN	Original	Life sim	Mr. Podunkian		
Sweetheart	Unknown	WIN, OSX, NS, PS5, XBX/S	Original	Narrative adventure	Genie Boy Games		
The Talos Principle 3	Unknown	WIN, PS5	Original	Puzzle, Adventure	Croteam	Devolver Digital	
Tempus Vitae	Unknown	WIN, PS5, XBX/S	Original	FPS, Metroidvania	Whiteboard Games		
Tenjutsu	Unknown	WIN, NS2	Original	Action, Rougelike	Deepnight Games	Devolver Digital	
Tetris Effect: Mixed Realities	Unknown	Quest, Meta VR Glasses	Original	Puzzle	Monstars, Resonair	Enhance Games	
Threads of Time	Q2/Q3	WIN, NS, NS2, XBX/S	Original	RPG	Riyo Games	Balor Games	
Tianji: Shadow of the Ancients	Unknown	WIN, NS, NS2, PS5	Original	RPG	Justdan International		
Tiny Metal 2	Unknown	WIN	Original	TBT	Area 35		
Tom Clancy's Rainbow Six Tactics	Unknown	WIN, PS5, XBX/S	Original	TBT	Ubisoft		
Toshinden Collection (Note: Includes Battle Arena Toshinden, Battle Arena Toshinden 2 and Battle Arena Toshinden 3)	Unknown	WIN, NS2, PS5	Compilation	Fighting	Edia		
Trivia Murder Party 3	Unknown	WIN, NS, NS2, PS4, PS5, XBO, XBX/S	Full release	Party	Jackbox Games		
Turok: Origins	Q1/Q2	WIN, NS2, PS5, XBX/S	Original	Action-adventure, TPS	Saber Interactive		
UN:Me	Unknown	WIN, NS2, PS5	Original	Adventure	historia	Shueisha Games	
Uncanyon	Unknown	WIN, NS2, PS5, XBX/S	Original	Puzzle, Adventure	Graceful Decay	Annapurna Interactive	
Undefeated: Genesis	Unknown	WIN, PS5	Original	Action-adventure	Indie-us Games	Chorus Worldwide	
Unyverse	Unknown	WIN	Original	Action RPG	Afrime Studios		
Venus: The Last Ascent	Q3/Q4	WIN	Full release	Survival	Breaking Walls		
VICE Undercover	Q1	WIN, OSX	Original	Simulation, Adventure	Ancient Machine Studios		
Vindictus: Defying Fate	Unknown	WIN, PS5	Original	Action RPG	Nexon		
Virtua Fighter Crossroads	Unknown	Unknown	Original	Fighting	RGG Studio	Sega	
Vision Quench	Q1	WIN	Original	Looter shooter	WizMUD Games	Pocketpair Publishing	
Vivarium	Unknown	WIN, XBX/S	Original	Adventure	Studio Meadowflower	Serenity Forge	
The War of the Worlds: Siberia	Unknown	WIN	Original	Action-adventure	1C Game Studios	For-Games CR	
Wardens of Avalon	Unknown	WIN	Original	Action RPG	Runes Studio	The Arcade Crew, Dotemu	
Warhammer Age of Sigmar: Deathmaster	Unknown	WIN, NS2, PS5, XBX/S	Original	Action, Platformer	Old Skull Games	Dotemu	
Warlock: Dungeons & Dragons	Unknown	WIN, PS5, XBX/S	Original	Action-adventure	Invoke Studios	Wizards of the Coast	
Warota: I Live Next to The Demon King's Castle LOL	Unknown	WIN, NS2, PS5	Full release	City builder (village)	Team Earth Wars	One or Eight	
Welcome to Brightville	Unknown	WIN, PS5, XBX/S	Original	Action	Contrast Games		
Westlanders	Q1/Q2	WIN	Early access	CMS, Sandbox	The Breach Studios	Team17	
Wild Wild Eden	Q1/Q2	WIN	Early access	Survival, RPG	Magnus Games Studio	Shueisha Games	
Wilderings: The Lost Spring	Q1/Q2	WIN, NS, PS5, XBX/S	Original	Action, Roguelite	Herobeat Studios	Kabam	
Winds of Viridia	Q1	WIN, NS2	Original	Action-adventure	Shark Jump, Matt Trobbani	Shark Jump	
Witch the Showdown	Unknown	WIN, PS5, XBX/S	Full release	Deck building	CitalesGames	Perp Games	
The Witcher 3: Wild Hunt – Songs of the Past	Unknown	WIN, NS2, PS5, XBX/S	Expansion	Action RPG	CD Projekt Red, Fool's Theory	CD Projekt	
Wolcen II	Unknown	WIN	Early access	Action RPG, Dungeon crawl	Wolcen Studio		
The Wolf Among Us 2	Unknown	WIN, NS, NS2, PS5, XBO, XBX/S	Original	Graphic adventure, Interactive film	Telltale Games	Telltale Games, PM Studios	
WonderPaws	Unknown	WIN, iOS, DROID	Original	Life sim	Cat Paw Latte	Farlight Games	
Worms: Galactic Tactics	Unknown	WIN, NS2, PS5, XBX/S	Original	TBT, Roguelike	Absolutely Games	Team17	
Xenoblade Genesis	Unknown	NS2	Original	Action RPG	Monolith Soft	Nintendo	
Yakoh Shinobi Ops	Unknown	WIN, PS5	Original	Stealth, Action	Acquire	Shueisha Games	
Zoopunk	Unknown	WIN, PS5, XBX/S	Original	Action-adventure	TiGames		
