= Video games in Russia =

Video games in Russia encompass the development, distribution, and cultural impact of gaming within the country. The industry traces its roots to the Soviet era, with globally influential contributions like Alexey Pajitnov's Tetris, created in 1984. Since then, the Russian gaming industry has continued to grow, with a market size of 2.3 billion dollars and total audience of 110 million people in 2026. Despite challenges such as widespread piracy, international sanctions, and government regulation, video games have influenced Russian economy and culture through esports, gaming language, and game development.

== History ==
The history of gaming in Russia began in the early 1980s in the Soviet Union, when various personal computers such as the Atari 400 and 800, Commodore 64, and ZX Spectrum 48/128 were brought to the country from the United States, Europe, Japan, and China. At the same time, a local brand, Electronika, released a series of portable game consoles which were mostly clones of Nintendo products. By the mid 80s, Soviet programmers and enthusiasts began trying to develop their own games. The most famous Russian game designer of this era is Alexey Pajitnov, who is best known for creating Tetris. Several NES clone consoles, made by the Taiwanese company Bit Corp, were released in the USSR as well.

The Dendy, a Taiwanese hardware clone of the Famicom/Nintendo Entertainment System, was released for the Russian market in 1992. By 1994, over one million Dendy units were sold in Russia. The Dendy went on to sell a total of 6 million units in Russia and other post-Soviet states.

In 2010, Ministry of Communications and Mass Media of Russia encouraged Russian video game companies to make video games that were deemed "patriotic," as it was felt that foreign video game publishers made games that were anti-Russian.

In 2024, Valve agreed to take down all banned video game content from its Russian store on Steam in alignment with Russia's attempts to increase censorship. Russia also banned Discord for allowing "terrorist and extremist activities" to take place on its platform.

== Demographics and popularity ==
Russia is one of the world's largest gaming markets, ranking 11th globally in 2018 with 65.2 million players spending $1.7 billion on video games. Among the online population, PC gaming is the most popular, with 60% of men and 39% of women playing the game. Mobile gaming is nearly evenly split between genders, with 52% of men and 46% of women participating. Console gaming remains less popular, with participation rates of 21% for men and 13% for women.

Additionally, a 2019 VTsIOM survey revealed that one in five Russians actively played video games. Another 33% had played in the past but no longer did, while 48% said they had never played. Participation was highest among younger age groups, particularly those aged 18–24 and 25–34. However, older demographics in ages 45–59 and over 60 were more likely to play every day.

World of Tanks, a Belarusian-made battle simulator, was the most popular game, named by 11% of respondents. Other favorites included the classic card game Solitaire (7%) and the Russian-made mobile game Pirate Treasures (4%).

While many Russians play video games, most Russians are reluctant to spend money on it. Nearly 79% of respondents said they would not pay for games, subscriptions, or gaming equipment. Among those willing to spend, the average monthly expenses they are willing to make was 959 rubles ($14.30).

== Regulation ==
=== Digital isolation ===
As of 2022, there is a significant digital divide between Russia and the global Internet community in terms of operating systems and social media platforms. The removal of support for operating systems created by Apple, Samsung, and Microsoft has limited the availability of new game releases, updates, and online multiplayer functionalities, further isolating Russian gamers from the global gaming community. The Russian government also limits access to YouTube, Instagram, and X, claiming a lack of oversight. Some players note feeling stifled by the government's crackdown on freedom of speech, expressing that censorship has stripped them of the opportunity to connect with like-minded individuals and build a sense of community.

=== Government ===
Russian authorities are using specific scenes in video games to spread propaganda through "trending" social media networks such as Vkontakte, Russia's most popular one. For example, the government circulated videos of Minecraft players re-enacting the Battle of Soledar from the invasion of Ukraine on social media networks. The government also boosted engagement on content from World of Tanks, where players celebrated the defeat of Nazi Germany with a recreation of the Soviet Union's parade of tanks in Moscow in 1945. The government subsidizes Russian game designers who develop patriotic video games, such as Cutting Edge which features a clash between distinctly advantageous Russian troops and American troops.

== Piracy ==
The International Intellectual Property Alliance 2009 report estimated 282.1 million in market value losses due to video game piracy in Russia. Because many retailers upcharge titles, many Russian gamers resort to purchasing pirated games. In 2022, around 69% of Russian gamers reportedly pirated a video game. Pirated video game content is often accessed through BitTorrent indexing sites and Wireless Application Protocol (WAP) websites on mobile devices. Many internet game cafes and large retail chains also openly carry pirated video game products. Russian law enforcement monitors piracy through raids of disc plants, warehouses, and businesses. However, investigations may take months to over a year due to a large volume of cases and government understaffing.

== Markets ==
The video game market in Russia has steadily increased since 2018. In 2020, the volume of the market increased by an estimated 35% while 2021 saw a substantially smaller increase of 7.7%.

=== Impacts of Russo-Ukrainian War ===
Due to the Russian invasion of Ukraine, many game developers left the video game industry as well as many business partners finding it difficult to interact with Russian companies amidst the ongoing sanctions. This led to the market decreasing in volume by 80% with many Russians opting to pirate games to circumvent the sales bans. The Russian government attempted to support the video game industry during this time by distributing grants to game developers. One of the motivations behind these grants was to promote patriotic values in video games.

== Language ==
The Russian gaming sphere has developed its own set of terms that are widely used across various games through methods such as abbreviation, calquing, and prefixing. In addition, since English is the predominant language in games, gamers use these methods to further their English knowledge both passively and actively. One such example is the usage of "забуститься" (zaboostit'sya), a term used in PlayerUnknown's Battlegrounds which means "boost" or climb up a hill in-game.

== Esports ==
=== Growth of esports ===
Russia has emerged as one of the top esports markets, second only to Sweden. Major tournaments attract large crowds, with fans paying up to 9,900 rubles ($175) for three-day passes. Esports infrastructure includes 3,000 computer clubs operating across 89 regions and growing by 15–20% annually.

Esports was officially recognized by the Russian government in 2001. Although it was temporarily removed from the National Sport Register in 2006 due to administrative changes, it was reinstated in 2016. By 2017, esports was granted equal status with other officially recognized sports.

Virtus.Pro, one of Russia's professional esports teams, has earned nearly $9 million in Dota 2 prize money and led the Commonwealth of Independent States (CIS) region during the 2017/2018 Dota Pro Circuit season. The team also won the regional League of Legends championship against M-19, securing a prize of 1.5 million rubles ($26,300). Virtus.Pro invested in infrastructure, including bootcamps and game houses, to support player development and Russia's growing esports scene.

=== The Russian Esports Federation (RESF) ===
The Russian Esports Federation (RESF), established in 2000, has organized over 1,000 competitions and awarded more than 300 million rubles in prize money. In 2024 alone, the federation conducted up to seven online tournaments daily. Major events under the Russian Esports Federation (RESF) include the Russian eSports Cup, the Championship of Russia, Russian Cup, RESF Open, BRICS Championship, Open Esports Student Games (OXY), All-Russian Student Esports League, National Student Esports League, School Mindsports & Esports League, Russian Electronic Football Cup, and the Electronic Football Championship of Russia. The Russian eSport Cup featured games like Dota 2, League of Legends, FIFA, and Hearthstone. The National Student eSport League also brought together university teams from across Russia, involving 102 teams from 91 universities.

=== Esports media and trends ===
Unlike in countries such as China and South Korea, which heavily emphasize video streaming, esports media in Russia is shaped by a hybrid model that blends traditional text-based journalism with video content. Platforms like Cybersport.ru exemplify this approach, having over 43 million visitors annually and generating approximately 200 million views. Russian esports media also incorporates "creolization," a strategy that combines verbal and visual elements to enhance audience engagement. This includes features such as hashtags, hyperlinks, sponsor logos, and interactive components like memes and call-to-action buttons.

== War influence in games ==
- IL-2 Sturmovik: Battle of Stalingrad: Simulates airplanes on the Eastern Front of World War II.
- The Truth About 9th Company: Simulates the Battle for Hill 3234 from the Soviet War in Afghanistan. The 2008 World Russian People's Council deemed the game effective in promoting patriotism and educating younger generations on Russian military history.
- Call of Duty: Black Ops Cold War: Before launch, the game was advertised with clips of real footage from the Cold War, including a teaser voiced over by KBG defector Yuri Bezmenov and news clips from the 1960s.
- Company of Heroes II: Based on the Eastern Front of World War II . The release was censored for being "anti-Russian" and portraying Soviet soldiers as war criminals.

== Russian game developers ==
| Name | Description | Platform | Most famous for | Games |
|---|---|---|---|---|
| 1C Company | 1C Game Studios is a multinational video game development studio and subsidiary of 1C Company. | PC | IL-2: Sturmovik | Rise of Flight: The First Great Air War, Deathless: The Hero Quest, Caliber, The War of the Worlds: Siberia |
| AIHASTO | AIHASTO is a Russian independent developer team founded by MakenCat and Umeerai. | PC | MiSide | Umfend, Wire Lips |
| Alter Games | Alter Games is a video game development company based in Moscow. | PC | Partisans 1941 | |
| Astrum Entertainment | Astrum Entertainment is a Russian video game developer and publisher based in Moscow. | PC, Console, Mobile | Allods Online | Warface, Legend: Legacy of the Dragons |
| Baba Yaga Games | Baba Yaga Games is a Russian video game developer based in Saint Petersburg. | PC, Console | Vasilisa and Baba Yaga | One Eyed Kutkh, Job Fit For a Devil |
| Battlestate Games | Battlestate Games is a Russian video game developer based in Saint Petersburg. The studio was founded in 2014 by Nikita Buyanov. | PC | Escape from Tarkov | Escape from Tarkov: Arena |
| Blackhub Games | Blackhub Games is a video game developer based in Moscow, Saint Petersburg and Nizhny Novgorod. | Mobile | Black Russia | |
| Brutal Software | Brutal Software is an independent video game developer. Formerly known as Narko Games. | PC | Vladik | Vladik Brutal, Valakas Story |
| CarX Technologies | CarX Technologies is a Russian video game developer based in Moscow and Krasnodar, with a focus on racing games. | PC, Console, Mobile | CarX Drift Racing | CarX Street, CarX Rally |
| Cats Who Play | Cats Who Play is a Russian video game developer based on Zelenograd. The studio was founded in 2005, with a focus on the development of real time strategy games. | PC | Syrian Warfare | Three Heros, The Cat! Porfirio's Adventure, Terminator: Dark Fate - Defiance, Front Edge |
| Cyberia Nova | Cyberia Nova is a Russian video game developer based in Novosibirsk. The studio was founded in 2015, with a focus on historical action role-playing games. | PC | Smuta | Zemsky Sobor |
| Dark Crystal Games | Dark Crystal Games is a video game studio based in Saint Petersburg, founded by industry veterans, including former Larian Studios developers. | PC | Encased: A Sci-Fi Post-Apocalyptic RPG | |
| Eagle Dynamics | Eagle Dynamics is a flight simulation software developer founded in Moscow in 1991 by Nick Grey and Igor Tishin. Following the death of Tishin in 2018, the company moved its headquarters to Switzerland, with employees around the world. | PC | Digital Combat Simulator | Su-27 Flanker, Flanker 2.0, Lock On: Modern Air Combat |
| FishSoft | FishSoft is a developer of fishing video games. | PC | Russian Fishing 4 | |
| Forward Development | Forward Development is a driving simulation software developer based in Novosibirsk. | PC | City Car Driving | City Car Driving 2.0 |
| Four Quarters | Four Quarters is an independent developer based in Moscow. | PC, Console, Mobile | Loop Hero | Please, Don't Touch Anything |
| HFM Games | HFM Games is a Russian video game developer based in Saint Petersburg. | PC | FPV Kamikaze Drone | |
| K-D LAB | K-D Lab is a Russian video game developer founded in 1995 and based in Kaliningrad. | PC | Vangers | Perimeter, Perimeter 2: New Earth, Maelstrom: The Battle for Earth Begins, Spanking Runners |
| KranX Productions | KranX Productions is a Russian game developer founded in 2004 by Andrey Kuzmin, formerly of K-D LAB and based in Kaliningrad. The studio remains closely associated with K-D Lab. | PC | The Truth About 9th Company | King's Bounty: Legions |
| Konstantin Koshutin | Konstantin Koshutin is an independent Russian game developer. | PC, Console, Mobile | HighFleet | Hammerfight |
| Morteshka | Morteshka is a Russian video game developer founded in Perm. The company also maintains offices in Yerevan, Armenia. | PC, Console | Black Book | The Mooseman, One-Eyed Likho |
| Mundfish | Mundfish is a multinational video game developer founded in 2017, and since headquartered in Cyprus. | PC, Console | Atomic Heart | Atomic Heart 2 |
| Owlcat Games | Owlcat Games is a game development studio founded in 2016 by Oleg Shpilchevskiy and Alexander Mishulin.The company is now headquartered in Paphos, Cyprus. | PC, Console | Pathfinder: Kingmaker | Pathfinder: Wrath of the Righteous, Warhammer 40,000: Rogue Trader, The Expanse: Osiris Reborn, Warhammer 40,000: Dark Heresy |
| Lesta Games | Lesta Games is a Russian video game development and film production company based in Saint Petersburg, Moscow, Minsk and Tashkent. From 2011 to 2022, the company was owned by Wargaming. | PC, Console, Mobile | Mir Tankov | The Entente: Battlefields WW1, Pacific Storm, Aggression – Reign over Europe, Reign: Conflict of Nations, Mir Korablej |
| Lipsar | Lipsar is a Russian video game developer based in Innopolis. | PC | Sparta 2035 | |
| Steel Balalaika | Steel Balalaika is a Franco-Russian video game developer founded in 2021. | PC | Broken Arrow | |
| Targem Games | Targem Games is a Russian video game developer and publisher based in Yekaterinburg, founded in 2002. | PC, Console, Mobile | Crossout | Battle Mages, Hard Truck Apocalypse, Star Conflict, Blazerush, Folk Hero |
| WATT Studio | WATT Studio is a Russian animation and video game studio founded in 2020. | PC | Tsarevna | GRIMPS, Hannah's Day |
