= Golden Lap =

2024 video game

- Steam edition cover
- Developers: Funselektor Labs, Strelka Games
- Publisher: Funselektor Labs
- Platforms: Windows; macOS; Android
- Release: September 26, 2024; 2 years ago
- Genre: Management
- Mode: Single-player

Golden Lap is a 2024 management video game developed and published by Funselektor Labs.

== Gameplay ==
A qualifying race. The leaderboard, track, and metrics of a driver can be seen.

Golden Lap is a sports management video game. Set in the 1970s, the player takes control of a Formula One team, managing personnel, car construction, driver training, and race performance. There are two game modes available: Career, where the player creates a team and manages it throughout the season, and Quick race, where a single race is played with a preset team. Core gameplay, with cars represented as colored dots racing along a thick line, is shared between the two.

The first part of a race is qualifying. Here, each car is sent out individually, with drivers competing for faster lap times and better start positions that come with it. They gain tuning tokens while on the track, which is spent on upgrading the car once they return to the pits. Tokens are spent on three categories that represent different metrics of car performance, each with its own sweet spot, known as the "Golden Tune". The closer the tune is to golden, the better the car will perform; however, a tune exceeding Golden results in a penalty and significantly worsened performance.

After qualifying (which lasts 30 in-game minutes) concludes, the main race begins, with cars lining up on the starting grid and racing along the track. Here, the player must balance speed, fuel consumption, and stress so that the cars do not crash, which may result in a driver getting injured and missing a race or dying..

== Development and release ==
Golden Lap was created and published by Funselektor Labs, a Vancouver, Canada-based indie developer best known for their singleplayer racing games Absolute Drift and Art of Rally. It was released for Windows and macOS through Steam on September 26, 2024, following two playtesting periods in April and May.

== Reception ==
Golden Lap was released to a positive reception. Review aggregator Metacritic gave the game a score of 78, meaning "Generally Favorable".

Its simplistic gameplay received praise, with Mark Warren of VG247 labeling it "wonderfully relaxing minimalism" and Ben Lyons of Gamereactor describing it as "an F1 management simulator without all the fuss".
