= 171 =

171 may refer to:

- 171 (number), the natural number following 170 and preceding 172

== Dates ==
- 171 BC, the BC year
- AD 171
- January 17 (17.1), a day in every year
- AD 17 January (17.1), a month in a particular year
- January 1971 (1.71), a month in a particular year

== Places ==
- 171 Ophelia, asteroid #171, the asteroid Ophelia, the 171th asteroid registered, a main-belt asteroid
- 171 (road), see List of highways numbered 171

== Other uses ==
- Route 171 (MBTA), a bus route in Massachusetts, US
- 171 (New Jersey bus)
- 171 (video game)

== See also ==
- Flight 171 (disambiguation)
- Class 171 (disambiguation)
