= Class 171 =

Class 171 may refer to:

- British Rail Class 171, a type of diesel multiple-unit train
- Class 171, a Caledonian Railway 0-4-4T steam locomotive
- DRG Class ET 171, a three-car electric multiple-unit train

== See also ==
- All pages containing titles with "class" and "171"
- 171
