= Anima: Gate of Memories =

2016 video game

- Developer: Anima Project
- Publisher: Badland Indie
- Composers: Damian Sanchez; Marc Celma
- Engine: Unity
- Platforms: Microsoft Windows; Linux; PlayStation 4; Xbox One; Nintendo Switch; Remaster; PlayStation 5; Windows; Xbox Series X/S; Nintendo Switch 2
- Release: June 3, 2016; Remaster; PS5, Windows, Xbox Series X/S; November 7, 2025; Nintendo Switch 2; 2026
- Genre: Action role-playing
- Mode: Single-player

Anima: Gate of Memories is a 2016 action role-playing video game developed by Anima Project and published by Badland Indie. The game is based on the Spanish tabletop role-playing game Anima: Beyond Fantasy. It received mixed reviews from critics.

Remasters of it and its sequel were released on November 7, 2025 for Microsoft Windows, PlayStation 5, and Xbox Series X/S. They are scheduled to release for Nintendo Switch 2 in 2026.

== Gameplay ==
Anima: Gate of Memories is a third-person action RPG, with both combat and exploration. The game is open world and players can explore the world of Gaia and pick which tasks they complete, which in turn will impact the game's ending. The players are able to control the characters of The Bearer and Ergo Mundus. Only one of the two characters can fight at a time, however players can freely switch between them during fights.

== Soundtrack ==
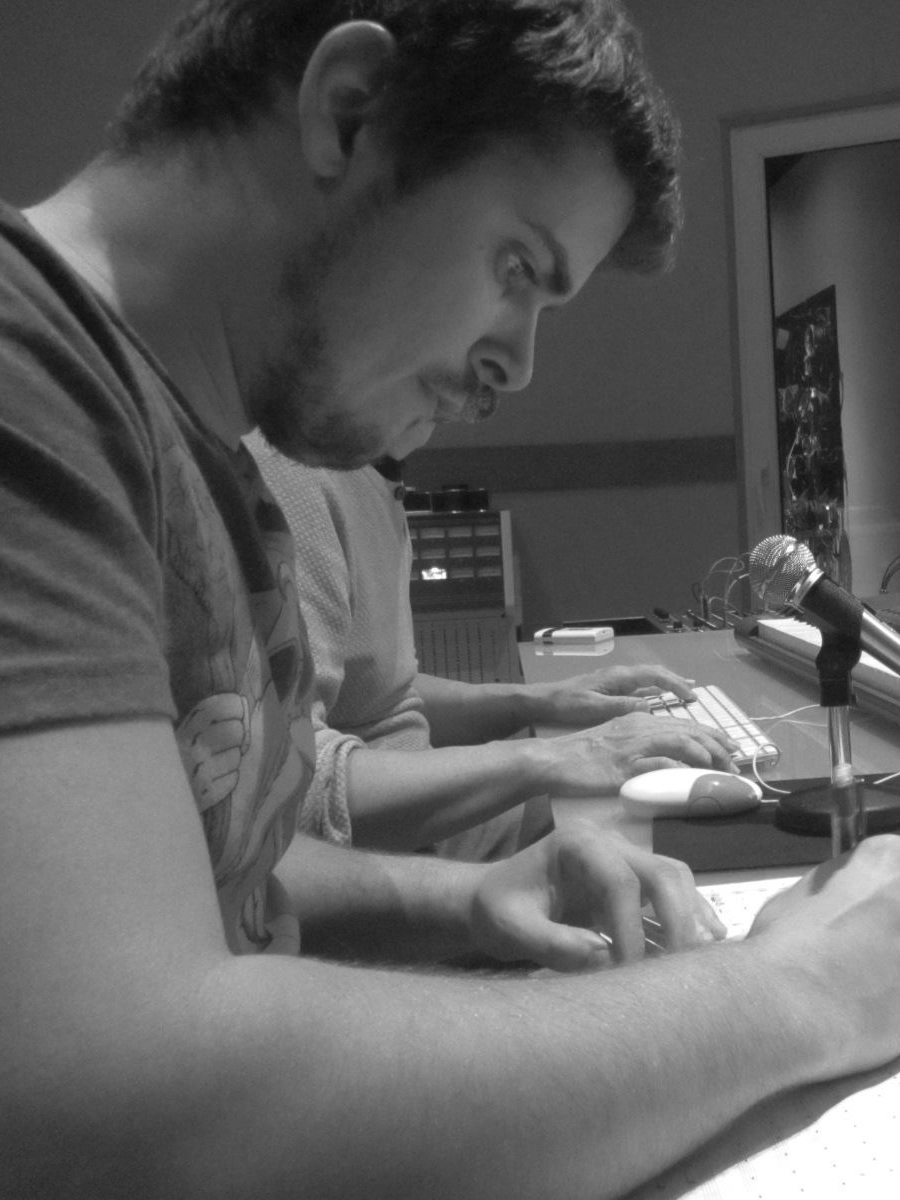
Damian Sanchez

The soundtrack is developed by Damian Sanchez and Marc Celma. Sanchez is a music composer, producer, sound designer and audio director of his own music production company based in Valencia, Spain, while Celma is a composer with a career of 15 years in the doom metal band Mentat.

== Reception ==
Reception

Aggregate score
Aggregator	Score
Metacritic	(PC) 69/100 (XONE) 72/100 (PS4) 52/100

Review scores
Publication	Score
Destructoid	8/10
Hardcore Gamer	6/10
IGN	8.5/10

Anima: Gate of Memories received "mixed or average" from critics, according to review aggregator website Metacritic. The game was praised for the longevity, the environments, and the soundtrack, while the criticisms were for the uncooperative camera, the bad tutorials, and the voice acting.
