= Flight 171 =

Flight 171 may refer to the following aviation incidents or significant flights:

- Indian Airlines Flight 171, crashed while landing at Bombay Airport, 1976
- Air India Flight 171, crashed just after takeoff from Ahmedabad, 2025
- Saha Airlines Flight 171, crashed on landing at Mehrabad Airport, 2005

== See also ==
- 171
