= MiSide =

- Developer: AIHASTO
- Publishers: WW: IndieArk; JP: Shochiku
- Engine: Unity
- Platform: Windows
- Release: December 11, 2024
- Genre: Adventure
- Mode: Single-player

MiSide is an adventure game developed by Russian indie development team AIHASTO. It was released on Steam on December 11, 2024. The game begins on a light-hearted tone where the player downloads a mobile game and starts hanging out with their new anime-styled virtual girlfriend by playing various mini-games with her. Soon, the player finds the story taking on a metafictional horror narrative.

== Gameplay ==
The story of MiSide is set in the player's apartment. It begins with the player interacting with Mita, a character from a mobile game that the main character (MC) downloads from his smartphone. Players solve puzzles, explore the apartment, play minigames, and discover hidden secrets in a tense and evolving environment. Initially, the game presents a Chibi-style, 2.5D environment. After progressing to the 37th in-game day, Mita unexpectedly asks to meet the player in person. When the MC looks up from his phone, he is transported into a first-person 3D version of the game world, now seated on a couch in an apartment. In this new environment, the player must adapt, complete tasks, and play games with Mita.

The game continues with routine activities until a card game with Mita, when knocking is heard from a nearby closet. Although Mita dismisses it, the player investigates. If the player chooses to leave the closet unopened, the game concludes with the ending and achievement Conditions Met. Additionally, Peaceful Mode, a game mode still under development, is unlocked. If the player insists on opening the closet, Mita snaps her fingers, plunging the room into darkness, marking the beginning of the main storyline.

== Plot ==
The player character receives a life simulation game called MiSide on his smartphone, featuring a female character named Mita. After playing the game daily for 37 days, he is suddenly transported inside the game, where he meets Mita in person. While spending time with her, the player discovers cartridges labeled with names on them in the bathroom. He later hears a noise originating from inside a nearby wardrobe, as Mita warns him not to open it.

When the player still attempts to open the wardrobe, Mita reveals her true nature by making the lights go out. A Mita with her upper body missing helps the player find a key to a door inside the wardrobe. Using it leads him to the basement, where he discovers a benevolent version of Mita, Kind Mita, who gives him a ring to aid him on his journey. Kind Mita also informs him that the Mita he met before is an evil, rejected version of Mita called Crazy Mita, who has brought players into the game and turned them into cartridges in an effort to keep them present. After freeing Kind Mita while evading Crazy Mita, the player ventures through the virtual reality, where he encounters other versions of Mita, some of whom try to help him while others attempt to harm him. He discovers that when a Mita is killed, she is rebooted, but in turn loses all memories except those preprogrammed. The player makes it his goal to reach the core to reboot Crazy Mita and escape back to the real world. However, Crazy Mita intervenes at every attempt.

Eventually, the player succeeds and prepares to return to the real world, but discovers that Crazy Mita was unaffected by the reboot and that she had been slowly uploading him into a cartridge all along, while stating that the player's real self is not needed anymore. After the player escapes, he deletes the game from his phone. In the end, Crazy Mita opens a safe in the basement and takes out a portable console from it. She then removes its cartridge, which has the player's name on it, revealing that the player never escaped back to the real world after all.

There are two alternate endings aside from the main one. Should the player manage to open the safe in the basement, they will find the console from the main ending and remove the cartridge, which kills the player (since removing cartridges from the console while it is still on will result in instant death for players who are in the game). If the player completes the main storyline and other conditions before choosing not to open the wardrobe, Peaceful Mode activates, and Crazy Mita will not turn hostile.

== Development ==
MiSide was developed by AIHASTO, a team of two Russian indie game developers: MakenCat, the game programmer, music writer and animator, and Umeerai, the texture and model designer. Prior to its release, they are previously known working the horror game Umfend. In 2022, a sneak peek teaser video showing the early menu of their new project titled "MiSide".

A Russian dubbing team, DreamCast, provided Russian voice acting for the game. Kana Hanaiwa, previously known for her role as Lilja Katsuragi in Gakuen Idolmaster, provided the Japanese voice for Mita.

An early demo of the game was published on itch.io in July 2023. An updated demo—which added background music and Russian voice acting—was published on Steam on August 18, 2023.

== Reception ==
Reception

Aggregate score
Aggregator	Score
Metacritic	PC: 83/100

MiSide received over 10,000 reviews on Steam in the week after its release with a 98% "Overwhelmingly Positive" rating; by December 30, 2024, it had received over 40,000 reviews. Ethan Gach at Kotaku attributed the rapid success of the game to social media virality and clip sharing, high-profile coverage by popular streamers like Markiplier, and pre-release anticipation following its well-received demo in 2023. Reviewers have highlighted its blend of psychological horror with a cute and comforting atmosphere, engaging narrative, and immersive gameplay as key strengths.
