= Warhammer 40,000: Dark Heresy =

Upcoming video game

- Developer: Owlcat Games
- Publisher: Owlcat Games
- Series: Warhammer 40,000
- Platforms: PlayStation 5; Windows; Xbox Series X/S; Nintendo Switch 2
- Release: PC, PS5, Xbox Series X/S; January 28, 2027; Nintendo Switch 2; TBA
- Genre: Role-playing
- Mode: Single-player

Warhammer 40,000: Dark Heresy is an upcoming role-playing video game developed and published by Owlcat Games. Based on the tabletop RPG of the same name, it is set to be released on January 28, 2027 for PlayStation 5, Windows and Xbox Series X/S. A version for Nintendo Switch 2 is also in development.

== Gameplay ==
Dark Heresy is a role-playing video game played from an isometric perspective. As with Rogue Trader, Owlcat's previous game, the game features turn-based combat, and introduces a morale system. High morale grant the party or the opposing characters combat buffs, while low morale will cause some of them to panic or surrender. In addition, it also features a number of gameplay improvements, such as a reworked cover system and line of sight, and the introduction of new character abilities. Individual body parts of an enemy can be targeted, maiming them and hurting their combat capabilities. Some enemies also have a "concentration" ability, enabling them to deal devastating damage to the player's crew, though their attacks can be disrupted through damaging them or lowering their morale.

Outside of combat, Dark Heresy is also a detective game where the Inquisitor must inspect and analyze evidence, identify suspects involved in a crime, and connect threads of events to uncover the underlying conspiracy. Companions can also give additional insights to each investigation. A journal keeps track of the player's progress in each investigation. The game does not halt the player's progress if they declare an innocent NPC as a heretic, though each choice has consequences, and characters in the world will react to the Inquisitor's decisions.

== Story ==
In the game, the player assumes control of an Imperial inquisitor and their party of companion characters, who are dispatched to an area of the galaxy known as the Calixis Sector to investigate a series of disappearances and uncover the mysteries behind the "Tyrant Star" which holds the power to planetwide destruction.

== Development ==
Dark Heresy is Owlcat Games' second game set in the Warhammer 40,000 universe following Rogue Trader. According to the team, instead of refining existing systems, they opted to rebuild most of them from scratch in an effort to introduce "more components for the player expressing himself, be it in combat, in inventory, in a cutscene, or in a dialogue". Compared to Rogue Trader, Dark Heresy was designed to be a shorter experience, with a larger focus on reactivity. Executive producer Anatoly Shestov added that the narrative of Dark Heresy had a darker, less heroic tone. The team deliberately avoids indicating whether player choices are correct, believing this aligns with the Inquisition’s thematic moral ambiguity, where players may unknowingly prosecute innocent individuals. Night Lords, which are villainous Space Marines who betrayed the Imperium, serve as one of the game's antagonists, and the team consulted with Black Library author Aaron Dembski-Bowden to give these characters more depth. The game includes full voice-overs for all characters in the game.

Dark Heresy was announced by Owlcat Games and Games Workshop in May 2025. The game is set to be released on January 28, 2027 for Windows, PlayStation 5, and Xbox Series X and Series S. A Nintendo Switch 2 version is also planned.
