= Absolute Drift =

2015 video game

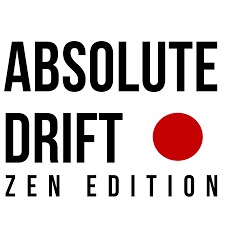
- Developers: Funselektor Labs; FlippFly (Zen Edition)
- Publishers: Funselektor Labs; FlippFly (Zen Edition); Noodlecake (iOS)
- Engine: Unity
- Platforms: Linux, OS X, Windows, PlayStation 4, Xbox One, iOS, Android, Switch, Apple TV
- Release: Windows, OS X, Linux; 29 July 2015; PS4; 29 August 2016; Xbox One; 25 August 2017 iOS; 12 July 2018; Android; 4 December 2018; Switch; 3 December 2020
- Genre: Racing
- Mode: Single-player

Absolute Drift is a racing video game developed and published by Funselektor Labs. It was released on 29 July 2015 on Windows, OS X and Linux. It was also released on 29 August 2016 on the PlayStation 4 and 25 August 2017 on the Xbox One respectively as Absolute Drift: Zen Edition. Physical media copies on disc were released for the PlayStation 4 platform through Limited Run Games on 13 October 2017, and was limited to 4,000 printed copies. A Nintendo Switch version was released on 3 December 2020.

== Gameplay ==
Absolute Drift features 5 free roam areas and 34 tracks. In the free roam areas, there are various objectives for the player to complete which unlock more levels and cars. The tracks also have objectives to complete, including gaining points in a drift-based scoring system.

== Release ==
Absolute Drift: Zen Edition has been released on the PlayStation 4 which went on sale on 15 November in the United States. It was also released on the Xbox One which was also released in November. Absolute Drift began on Windows, OS X and Linux on 29 August 2016 which is a month before the Zen Edition release. It was then made available on iOS and Android in 2018. A Nintendo Switch version was released on 3 December 2020.

== Reception ==
Reception

Aggregate score
Aggregator	Score
Metacritic	PC: 66/100; PS4: 78/100; NS: 70/100

On Windows, Absolute Drift received "mixed or average" reviews from critics, according to the review aggregation website Metacritic, while Absolute Drift: Zen Edition received generally favorable reviews on the PlayStation 4.

== See also ==
- Art of Rally, 2020 racing game also developed by Funselektor Labs
