= The Expanse: Osiris Reborn =

Upcoming video game by Owlcat Games

- Developer: Owlcat Games
- Publisher: Owlcat Games
- Director: Alexander Mishulin
- Composer: Paweł Perepelica
- Engine: Unreal Engine 5
- Platforms: PlayStation 5; Windows; Xbox Series X/S
- Release: Early 2027
- Genre: Action role-playing
- Mode: Single-player

The Expanse: Osiris Reborn is an upcoming action role-playing video game developed and published by Owlcat Games. The project expands the universe of the science fiction novel series The Expanse, created by Daniel Abraham and Ty Franck. The game is set to be released for PlayStation 5, Windows and Xbox Series X and Series S.

== Gameplay ==
The Expanse: Osiris Reborn is an action role-playing video game played from a third-person perspective. In the game, the player fights against enemies using a variety of firearms and gadgets, and hides behind cover to recover and regenerate lost health. At the beginning of the game, players can customize their player avatar and choose their specialization and background. As they progress, they will unlock new abilities across four skill trees that improve their mastery of using weapons and gadgets, enhance their survival skills, and improve their crewmates' combat performance. Weapons can also be customized and upgraded at workbenches. Players need to converse with various non-playable characters, some of which will join the player's party and become a companion who will assist them in combat. The game introduced a system allowing companion characters to destroy environmental structures to eliminate large groups of enemies. Throughout the game, players must make decisions that may influence the narrative.

== Plot ==
The player will take on the role of the commander of the Pinkwater Security mercenary squad, controlling a space frigate and fighting for survival in outer space. The game's events run parallel to the TV show's first two-and-a-half seasons, or the franchise's first two books.

== Development ==
Owlcat Games approached Alcon Entertainment and showed them early concepts for the game when they were about to finish developing Warhammer 40,000: Rogue Trader. Pre-production of the game started in 2022. Director Alexander Mishulin added that the game was smaller in scope when comparing with Rogue Trader, as it was designed to be more "cinematographic". Since it is the studio's first third-person game, Owlcat had to expand to recruit developers who had worked on other third-person RPGs such as Cyberpunk 2077. According to the developers, the main source of inspiration for them was the Mass Effect game series, and that some of the actors from the 2015 television series The Expanse will be involved in the development and will reprise their roles in the game. According to the team, the game will retain the core themes of the franchise, while having a lighter tone as it explores the ordinary life of people in the Expanse universe. David Gaider, who previously served as the writer for the first three Dragon Age game, also contributed to the game's narrative. After receiving negative feedback from early players, the team recast the lead male protagonist, who will now be voiced by Blythe Melin.

The game was officially announced on June 7, 2025. A closed beta for the game was released on April 22, 2026. It is set to be released for Windows, PlayStation 5, and Xbox Series X and Series S in early 2027.

== Reception ==
At the Golden Joystick Awards 2025, The Expanse was nominated for Best Game Trailer and Most Wanted Game.
