= Russian eSports Federation =

Russian esports organization

Russian eSports Federation (RESF) is the official eSports organization of Russia and is a member of the International e-Sports Federation.

RESF was founded in 2000 and achieved state recognition in 2001, 2004, and 2016.

It organizes the Russian eSports Cup, National eSports Student League, and eSports Championship of Russia.

Engaged in mass competitions, accreditation of sports fields, preparation of training materials, educational projects, and development of clubs and sections.
