= 171 (video game) =

- Logo
- Developer: Betagames Group
- Publishers: Betagames Group (PC); QUByte Interactive (consoles)
- Designers: Diogo Moraes; Renato Cesar; Kleverson Vieira; Eduardo Favaro
- Programmers: Diogo Moraes; Renato Cesar
- Artist: Eduardo Favaro
- Composer: Wesley "Wzy" Rios
- Engine: Unreal Engine 5
- Platforms: Windows; Nintendo Switch; Nintendo Switch 2; PlayStation 4; PlayStation 5; Xbox One; Xbox Series X/S
- Release: Alpha version; 17 November 2022; Final version; 2027
- Genre: Action-adventure
- Mode: Single player

171 (Um Sete Um) is an upcoming action-adventure game developed by Betagames Group, an independent team based in the state of São Paulo, Brazil. It is being published by Betagames Group for Windows and by QUByte Interactive for PlayStation 4, PlayStation 5, Xbox One, Xbox Series X/S, and Nintendo Switch. Set in the fictional city of Sumariti, based on Sumaré in São Paulo, the game revolves around Nicolau Souza, a young man with a turbulent life who gets entangled into the world of crime. The game's open world allows movement on foot or on a variety of vehicles.

The game was first conceived around 2010, when Brazilian-themed mods for Grand Theft Auto: San Andreas were common. Development was slow in the first years due to the small team of less than ten people working part-time on the project. Initially the Blender 3D engine was used, but in 2015 the game was re-created in Unreal Engine 4. 171 was publicly unveiled in that same year, generating great expectation in the media and being frequently nicknamed "the Brazilian Grand Theft Auto" thanks to its similarities with and inspiration from that famous game series. Betagames has since been releasing new development updates.

In January 2019, Betagames Group received over R$68,000 (equivalent to US$18,378) in donations on Catarse, a Brazilian crowdfunding platform, which contributed to its development and promotion in that year's Brasil Game Show (BGS) convention. After a pre-alpha release in March 2020, a second Catarse crowdfunding in May 2020 accumulated over R$195,000 (US$37,500). An alpha version was released in November 2022 through early access. A full release is expected for 2027.

== Name ==
In the Brazilian Penal Code, article 171 describes the crime of estelionato (confidence trick). Therefore, in Brazilian Portuguese slang, 171 refers to a con artist, or, more broadly, a "crook" or criminal.

== Gameplay ==
Inspired by the Grand Theft Auto series, 171 is an open-world action-adventure game with role-playing and third-person shooter elements. The player controls a young criminal living in a low-income neighborhood in Brazil who can complete several gigs, both legal and illegal, purchase and use firearms, drive and steal vehicles, and commit other illicit acts such as murder and theft. The scenery is a faithful parody of real-world neighborhoods in Brazil.

== Development ==
171 is by Betagames Group, an independent developer team of initially ten members, localized in the state of São Paulo, Brazil. In 2010 and 2011, a time when mods for games such as Grand Theft Auto: San Andreas that incorporated Brazilian elements (such as clothes, vehicles and locations) were popular, they had the idea of creating a similar game taking place in Brazil. In an interview for the website Nerd Interior, when asked "how did you come up with the idea of an open-world game specifically set in Brazil", Diogo Moraes, one of the developers, replied: "It's hard to find someone nowadays who doesn't like open-world games, isn't it? We, for instance, love the freedom adopted in those games, which are true works of art plus I think, 171 is the best game I’ve developed... Seeing mods that brought Brazilian content and even locations, despite fractioned, but more and more frequently [to video games] woke our interest and made us see the possibility of a creation focused on that goal. With time we saw that it wasn't just cool, but something that not only we, but people in general, were expecting." Between 2010 and 2015, the team used the Blender 3D engine, until it was replaced by Unreal Engine 4 in 2015. Development of 171 was slow in those early years. In 2015, Betagames even released another game, Minta se Puder ("Lie if you Can"), for Windows. A Patreon crowdfunding campaign for 171 was created that same year. As explained by Diogo Moraes, the development process is being carried out only part time: "Even though we are an indie team that can only dedicate their free time to [the game's] development, which in fact reflects in its production time, the project remains in intense development."

In October 2015, Betagames Group released a teaser trailer on their YouTube channel depicting 171's setting, gameplay and concept. The video obtained instant popularity in several media, including television: it appeared, for example, on the Programa do Porchat aired by RecordTV. The song used in the trailer was "Chavão", by Família Shake; Betagames Group consequently invited singers, DJs, bands and other independent artists to send their work to them so that it could be used in the game. Furthermore, the developers also invited graffiti artists to send their visual works, which they considered a form of cultural expression, giving an opportunity for less fortunate artists to get national recognition. Two days thereafter, another update, this one bringing new vehicles and weapons and changing the design of police cars, was released.

"Besides being developers, we also like to play. We know that these functions in an open-world game, like ours, must be treated with respect and attention. There's no point in creating a map as wide as an ocean but as shallow as a water pod."

— Kleverson Vieira, chief modeler of 171, about the game's development process.

In late 2016, Betagames Group's official website released a countdown to February 2017. Many speculated that the game would be released on that date. However, it was actually the date of a major update that was later postponed to May. In the following month, the team announced their partnership with Mega Provedor, an Internet service provider located in São Paulo, with the goal of allowing Betagames Group to "support a larger amount of daily online players", due to the large number of accesses the website was receiving. An online mode was also speculated. Finally, in May 2017, Betagames Group released another update, this one showing a gameplay experience on the expanded map. Through a partnership with YouTube channel Gigaton Games, the walkthrough had reached over 2 million views and 170,000 likes by June. The video shows the protagonist walking around the city, with several details referencing Brazilian suburbs, such as houses with unfinished walls, trash bins and painted utility poles. After another two months, another update showed the success of the social project released back in April 2016, in which several artists, including Família Shake, Sephion, Paradgma and Quartzo Records, sent their work to the developers. In September 2017, a YouTube channel, SanInPlay, analysed conceptual art of the game and concluded that the city in which the game would take place, up until then a secret, was based on Sumaré in upstate São Paulo, taking the fictional name Sumariti.

In February 2018, another development update was released with a video showing the protagonist driving a vehicle. The process of car tuning, the HUD, and new sound and map elements were also demonstrated. In late 2018, the team released the update "Jogar pra perder não é comigo" ("I do not play to lose") which showed new gameplay features, such as shooting mechanics and vehicle destruction. They also started a crowdfunding campaign on the Brazilian platform Catarse to present a playable game in the 2019 edition of the Brasil Game Show convention, in addition to providing free giveaways and extra content to supporters. By early 2019, the campaign had already reached R$68,000, successfully enlisting 171 into that year's Brasil Game Show. On 13 April 2020, another crowdfunding campaign started on Catarse: the first goal aimed at R$57,135 (US$11,030) and the second one an additional R$21,632 (US$4,174), with both goals combined totalizing R$78,767 (US$15,204). The second part of the funding would be invested on motion capture equipment for animation improvement. The campaign was successful with the team receiving over R$30,000 (US$5,791) in the first 24 hours and the intended amount in another day, allowing for a speeding up in the game's development. In total, this second campaign received over R$197,000 (US$38,038).

== Marketing and releases ==
Betagames Group has frequently promoted 171 on YouTube, with videos showing its development process. Some gaming channels have also established partnerships with the developers to announce new updates. A crowdfunding campaign on Catarse was launched with the goal of speeding up the game's development and promoting it on Brasil Game Show (BGS) in 2019. Depending on the value donated, the supporter would receive a copy of the then upcoming pre-alpha version and some giveaways, such as a T-shirt, a mug, a poster and a sculpture of the game's protagonist. 171's promotion on BGS 2019 resulted in many news articles about the game in the Brazilian media. IGN considered 171 one of the highlights in the convention, emphasizing its visibility among the audience. About their project being nicknamed the "Brazilian GTA", some of the developers said: "we don't like to call it the "Brazilian GTA", but they agreed that such comparison was "inevitable" and that they sometimes felt "flattered" for 171 being equated to "Rockstar's multi-billion franchise".

=== Pre-alpha versions ===
The first pre-alpha version was demonstrated on Brasil Game Show in October 2019 and consisted of ten cars, two weapons and a limited part of the city map. A second development version, titled "Pre-Alpha 2", was released on 25 March 2020. Its release was originally predicted for late 2019, but it had to be postponed in order to provide a "higher-quality experience to players". This new version is available for Microsoft Windows via Steam only for those who sponsored the previous campaign on Catarse with at least R$50 and for some few media personalities intending to promote the game, such as YouTubers who had signed partnerships with the developers. Unlike the first version showcased on BGS, Pre-Alpha 2 included a "wanted" system similar to that of Grand Theft Auto games, in addition to voice acting in Brazilian Portuguese and the possibility of changing clothes. This version was praised mainly for its setting, vehicle gameplay and voice acting.

After the release of Pre-Alpha 2, some YouTube channels and websites used the game's name for scams, claiming that it was available on other platforms (such as Android) and that there was a free version available for download, both on mobile devices and Windows. Some related that viruses capable of stealing their data entered their devices. Betagames Group and others positioned themselves against such acts and those channels were reported, with some of the videos being deleted. This, however, showed that several people were interested in obtaining the game, so Betagames Group announced that another crowdfunding campaign would be launched in the future.

=== Alpha version and early access ===
An alpha version was declared possible after another successful campaign on Catarse in May 2020. Predicted for the second semester of 2020, it would include new mechanics, a day-night cycle, new weapons, new vehicles (such as motorbikes), improvement of police and pedestrian AI, new movements, weapon shops, new clothes and bug fixes.

Due to the impact of the COVID-19 pandemic in the game's production, the alpha release was postponed to 23 March 2021. After additional production problems, it was postponed again to an unspecified time, with the developers announcing that they would not set another date for the alpha before "being fully sure of its conclusion in the best state of refinement". After a teaser trailer on 12 October 2022, the alpha was finally released on 17 November 2022 for Windows via early access on Steam, with versions for PlayStation 4, PlayStation 5, Xbox One, Xbox Series X/S and Nintendo Switch predicted for a later date. On its release day, 171 Alpha was the best sold game on Steam.

==== Fraud controversy ====
On 20 November, the developers were investigated after accusations of fraud and embezzlement according to a publication by a developer of the website MixMods. In the following day, Betagames published a statement defending themselves from the accusations.

=== Beta version ===
During the Catarse campaign of January 2019, Betagames Group commented that "if our goals are reached, we will be able to release a beta version somewhere in 2021". During the May 2020 campaign, the team confirmed that the beta version was still expected for 2021. After multiple delays, Betagames Group announced the cancellation of the beta in November 2024.

=== Final version ===
After the alpha release, Betagames Group stated its plans to release the final version of 171 in 2024, but also commented that the date might be changed in the future. The game has also switched to using Unreal Engine 5. In December 2025, Betagames Group stated that they expected to release the final version of 171 in Q3 2026. However, in October 2026, the game was postponed to sometime in 2027 due to the passing of the game's developer and full game not being 100% finished.
