= Pathfinder: Kingmaker =

2018 video game

- Developer: Owlcat Games
- Publisher: Deep Silver
- Director: Alexander Mishulin
- Programmer: Alexey Drobyshevsky
- Artist: Victor Surkov
- Composers: Inon Zur; Dmitry V. Silantyev (Note: Additional music by Mikhail Kotov, Sergey Eybog, Alexander Fomichev, Dryante)
- Series: Pathfinder
- Engine: Unity
- Platforms: Linux, macOS, Microsoft Windows, PlayStation 4, Xbox One
- Release: Linux, macOS, Windows; 25 September 2018; PlayStation 4, Xbox One; 18 August 2020
- Genre: Role-playing
- Mode: Single-player

Pathfinder: Kingmaker is a 2018 isometric role-playing game, developed by Owlcat Games, and published by Deep Silver, originally for Microsoft Windows, macOS, and Linux. Based on Paizo Publishing's Pathfinder franchise, the game sees players assume the role of a hero who becomes the ruler of their own kingdom, whereupon they deal with several problems that endanger their rule from neighbouring lands, various factions, and an otherworldly threat.

The game was developed following a successful Kickstarter campaign in 2017 by Owlcat, and focuses on a mixture of classic RPG gaming based upon notable titles such as Baldur's Gate, and basic management involving city building and contending with various events that impact the player's kingdom. The game received mixed reviews, praising the game's story and management system, but criticizing the difficulty curve and other problems.

An enhanced edition of Pathfinder: Kingmaker was released in 2019, with a console version, Pathfinder: Kingmaker - Definitive Edition, released on PlayStation 4 and Xbox One in 2020; a Nintendo Switch version was also planned but later canceled. A sequel, Pathfinder: Wrath of the Righteous, was released in 2021. As of 2026, the game is currently owned by Knights Peak, a subsidiary of My.Games, with over two million copies sold.

== Gameplay ==
Pathfinder: Kingmaker focuses on players assuming the role of a hero character they create, who will create their own kingdom and have to manage it, while contending with a variety of different main quests, alongside a multitude of side quests and locations to explore. The gameplay is modeled on the Pathfinder role-playing tabletop game, and is based on similar systems from classic computer RPGs such as Baldur's Gate and Neverwinter Nights. The game is played from an isometric perspective, allows players to conduct combat either in pausable real-time or turn-based, and features a range of different party companions they can recruit; these include established Pathfinder characters, along with new characters created for the game.

Pathfinder's unique aspect is an emphasis on realm-building - which begins after the player is given a kingdom of their own to rule over. Players begin with a single territory, but can acquire new lands with the option to add a new settlement in newly acquired territory. Settlements allow the player to construct different buildings, which confer bonuses to the kingdom's stats and specialized abilities (such as a fast-travel system between settlements), unlocking new buildings and building slots when they earn the right to upgrade a settlement - from a village, to a town and then to a city. To run the kingdom efficiently, players must appoint Advisors - roles the player can assign to any companions and allies they recruited, initially to five of the kingdom's stats, unlocking the remaining roles upon improving each advisor in rank. Advisors can then be assigned to either conduct projects - which can confer benefits for the player - or to handle kingdom events: these consist of problems that need handling or special opportunities (the latter can be ignored without penalty), the success of which is impacted by the difficulty of the event and the skill of the assigned advisor, and impacts how much a kingdom stat is changed; players can increase the chance of success by using special "Crisis Points" tokens, earning more from ranking up an advisor. At times, when an advisor is a certain rank and a stat is a certain amount, the player will be given a situation with different choices - these further impact a kingdom by improving or decreasing a kingdom stat, unlocking new projects, or providing a free building to construct.

Character customization allows players to choose which class they can use, with restrictions based on certain factors such as traits - each class also denotes what abilities/spells a character can use, along with what equipment they can use. The game features an alignment system - based on two factors: Lawful and Chaotic; Good and Evil - but unlike in Baldur's Gate, it fluctuates depending on the choices players make during the game - for example, if the player's character is True Neutral, choosing an action that is Lawful Good or Chaotic Evil, their alignment will shift to the respective alignment they went with. The alignment of the player's character provides notable additional choices which can impact how a situation changes, as well as also denoting how their kingdom will be perceived by its residents.

== Plot ==
=== Setting ===
Pathfinder: Kingmaker is based on the six modules that make up the Pathfinder Adventure Path campaign published in 2010. The game takes place in the world of Golarian, the setting for Pathfinder, which is inhabited with races and creatures in a similar context to that of the Dungeons & Dragons franchise, with the exception that some (such as satyr, dryads, unicorns and manticores) live within another dimension known as "The First World" - with Golarian's inhabitants referring to them as the Fey.

The game's story, including that of the DLC content, takes place within a region known as the Stolen Lands - a harsh land often plagued by bandits and monsters, and considered a buffer zone for several kingdoms including Brevoy, Pitax and Mivon, featuring a mixture of mountainous terrain, plains, forests and swamplands.

=== Synopsis ===
Jamandi Aldori, a noble in the kingdom of Brevoy, offers heroes their own barony within the Stolen Lands, if they can defeat the Stag Lord - a bandit leader operating in the region. Several heroes who arrive at her home heeding her summons are killed by raiders; Jamandi suspects a spy from Pitax aided them, with suspicion divided between the player's character and a gnome called Tartuccio. After the pair leave with their own party from survivors of the raid, the player's character finds evidence revealing Tartuccio was the spy, who is seeking a relic for Pitax's ruler, King Irovetti; Tartuccio is later killed when he finds the relics held by tribe of kobolds, after the player's party attempts to arrest him. During their search for the Stag Lord, the player's character is given aid by a nymph called the Guardian of the Bloom, who promises a reward if the Stag Lord is defeated, due to them using harmful magic upon the land. The player's character succeeds in defeating the Stag Lord, whereupon they become the new Ruler of their own kingdom by Jamandi.

After the kingdom is founded, the Ruler is asked by the Guardian to meet them alone for their promised reward; however, the nymph ambushes them with Fey creatures, giving no reason for her actions, and forcing the Ruler to escape the ambush. Over the coming months, the kingdom is soon beset with problems: the Ruler is forced to deal with attacks by trolls and kobolds who have formed their own kingdom - in which they discover Tartuccio was somehow resurrected as a kobold, but with no idea why; and ending a mysterious condition called the Bloom - in which people are forcefully made to ingest magical seeds that eventually bloom inside them, killing them and spawning monsters. During this time, the Ruler encounters visions concerning the Guardian, who is kind-hearted compared to how she was to them, and an unknown Fey entity who punished the nymph for something they did. Whilst resolving these issues, the Ruler is aided by two priests: Tristian, a devout follower of their faith; and Jhod Kavken. Both detect unnatural energy coming off a nearby hilltop, suspecting it is cursed to release monsters. After preparing for and dealing with waves of Fey creatures, Jhod later determines the attacks were not from a curse, but someone in the First World invading the mortal world; though with no idea why.

The Ruler later is tasked to investigate a neighbouring kingdom that was being formed in the eastern regions of the Stolen Lands, after it goes quiet. After discovering the cause of the trouble, the Ruler is betrayed by Tristian, who was working for the Guardian; the Ruler is later forced to track them down, whereupon they either kill them, exile them, or forgive them and let them return to atone. The Ruler then aids Brevoy repel a barbarian attack - in the process, learning the leader of the barbarian horde was being influenced by someone else into doing so, but with no clear idea why. In response to their aid, Jamandi recognises the Ruler's barony as a kingdom, leading to them being crowned as its monarch. In responspe to this, Irovetti invites the Ruler to visit them for a celebration; however, after finding him meddling in their kingdom in order to conquer it, the Ruler is forced to kill them for their actions.

Eventually, the Ruler and their allies discover that all of the recent events they dealt with were orchestrated by the Guardian, who launches another attack on their kingdom. After defending against it, the Ruler leads an expedition to find the nymph, discovering a portal to their realm in the First World. Once there, they discover the nymph was once a kind-hearted being called Nyrissa, whose pride led her to attempt to become an Eldest - an immortal ruler of the First World. Her actions, however, angered the other Eldests, with one of them, the Lantern King, punishing her by stripping a part of her soul and cursing her to make amends by destroying a total of a thousand kingdoms. The Ruler and their companions realize that Nyrissa effectively brought the downfall of kingdoms formed in the Stolen Lands; with the downfall of Pitax being her 999th kingdom she needed for her apology.

Now aware of what is going on, the group find their way into Nyrissa's home, battling and eventually defeating her. The effect of doing so collapses her own kingdom, completing the magical apology she needed to make to the Lantern King. At this point, the player is given a choice on how to complete the game:

- If the player lets Nyrissa bring her apology to the Lantern King, the Eldest accepts it, but reveals her actions have now cursed her with what she had sought out. For the Ruler, their kingdom is saved from further trouble by the nymph, allowing it to continue to live on.
- If the player kills Nyrissa or offers her an alliance, the Lantern King reveals they aided the Ruler in various guises during the story. Angered, though, that they ruined their "game" by killing/allying with Nyrissa, he proceeds to launch an attack with the spirits of Nyrissa's victims, bringing the Ruler's kingdom into the First World. The Ruler fights to reclaim their capital with their allies, and ultimately defeats the Lantern King, who offers them immortality as their herald, but otherwise ends further trouble to the kingdom.
- If the ruler researches curses extensively, is kind to Nyrissa to the point of showing her love, and recovers a relic called The Briar, the Ruler offers it to them as a means to end the curse they were under. In doing so, Nyrissa is returned to her kind-hearted true self, whereupon she allies with the Ruler to defeat the Lantern King. To defeat the Eldest, who is determined to be the real villain of their troubles, the Ruler convinces Nyrissa to use a mask imbued with part of the Eldest's power, bouncing back his own curses on him and killing him permanently. The Ruler and Nyrissa enter an alliance, with the kingdom acting as a conduit between the mortal world and the First World.

=== Varnhold's Lot ===
During the time the Ruler is working to establish their kingdom, Jamandi appoints the mercenary leader Maeger Varn to form their own barony, called Varnhold, in the eastern Stolen Lands. Maeger is aided in their endeavour by the wizard Cephal Lorentus, and a small group of mercenaries who work with the General (the player's character in the DLC), as they deal with problems impacting Varnhold's development. Centaurs later attack the barony; in the wake of their defeat, they warn the General not to disturb an ancient evil slumbering beneath the land. Maegar later sends the mercenaries to end a civil war in a nearby village caused by a death cult; after defeating them, the cultists' leader informs them a great "master" has awoken from its tomb.

After determining these words refer to the evil the centaurs warned them about, Maegar has the General accompany him and Cephal to find the tomb. The group soon discover it to be a fortress sunk into the ground, filled with illusions and traps. After Maegar and Cephal are separated from them, the General leads their party deeper into the fortress, finding a portal to the First World, and discovering the evil is a powerful Will-o'-the-wisp. After defeating it, the group encounter a satyr called the Horned Hunter (who in the main story is actually the Lantern King) who reveals recent events were all a long joke created by them.

The Hunter then offers a "gift" to the general, which varies depending on the player's choice in the DLC, where they either: become a mimic, eating other adventurers; forced to defend the tomb from an endless army of Fey; or become stranded in the First World. Regardless of the General's fate, the Hunter kills off their companions, whilst Maegar and Cephal return to Varnhold assuming the worst is behind them.

=== Beneath the Stolen Lands ===
During the main story, the Ruler starts having dreams pointing to a massive dungeon in the Narlmarches called the Tenebrous Depths. Seeking out the dungeon, they and their party encounter a silver dragon called Xelliren, who reveals it sent the dreams to the Ruler. The dragon explains that the dungeon is host to a Spawn of Rovagug, an ancient creature that lay waste to entire continents. Several metallic dragons helped to bring it down with the other races centuries ago, but Xelliren fears it is returning; it sort out heroes to help defeat it, but the Spawn spread its influence into the dungeon, driving mad anyone that came to stop it.

Xelliren implores the Ruler to help it stop the Spawn, asking them to also bring down four adventurers who were driven mad and have now become threats within. Aided by their companions, the party delves deep into the dungeon, dealing with each corrupted adventurer in their path and coming across their belongings. How the player deals with the Spawn when they find depends on certain actions:

- If the player focuses on finding the Spawn and defeating it, Xelliren congratulates the Ruler for their success. However, it warns the pattern will likely repeat against thousand of years later, but that for now, the threat is over.
- If the player checks the journals and writings of the fallen adventurers, they find evidence that Xelliren was unintentionally helping the Spawn by bring it adventurers. Shocked by the revelation, Xelliren disappears; later returning to aid the Ruler's party in the fight with the Spawn. Although the dragon is mind-controlled, the Ruler saves Xelliren by defeating the Spawn, whereupon the dragon congratulates them for permanently defeating the creature.

== Development ==
Following the game's announcement, Owlcat announced they were considering different funding avenues. This culminated in the June 2017 launch of the Kickstarter campaign, which was billed as for expanding the game rather than funding it. The campaign ended by the end of the month after raising US$909,057 from more than 18,000 contributors. Chris Avellone, an acclaimed scriptwriter for other role-playing games, contributed to the game.

The game was published by Deep Silver and was released on 25 September 2018. On June 6, 2019, Enhanced Edition update was released for computer platforms. On August 18, 2020, ports for PlayStation 4 and Xbox One were released subtitled Definitive Edition. The computer versions got an update at the same time that was titled Enhanced Plus Edition.

== Reception ==
Reception

Aggregate score
Aggregator	Score
Metacritic	PC: 73/100; PS4: 74/100; XONE: 74/100

Review scores
Publication	Score
GameSpot	6/10
IGN	6.8/10
PC Gamer (US)	69/100

Pathfinder: Kingmaker received mixed reviews, holding an aggregate score of 73 out of 100 on Metacritic. The Game Debate review praised the game's engrossing story, depth and realm management feature, calling it "a beautiful looking, rich CRPG, that delivers a great place to adventure, an interesting land to rule and the tools to carve out a realm that you can call home". In a somewhat less enthusiastic review, GameSpot's Daniel Starkey believes the game to be "hampered by a litany of small issues, balancing, and the gargantuan knowledge base you'll need to play most effectively", while also lauding the narrative and the kingdom management aspect of the game, mentioning that "for those with the patience, the rewards are well worth the investment". The game has also been criticized for its inconsistent difficulty curve and the opaqueness of some of its mechanics.

On the technical side, the game's launch was plagued by numerous bugs, long loading screens and balance issues, which hurt the game's initial reception with both professional critics and customers. In the following months, many of these issues have been fixed by patches except the Playstation 4 edition that remains subject to regular crashes, save file deletion and assorted technical, frame rate and graphical issue.

In September 2021, the game had sold over one million copies worldwide.

== Sequel ==
Owlcat announced a sequel, Pathfinder: Wrath of the Righteous, in December 2019. Narratively, the game follows the same-named Adventure Path published in August 2013, where the player's party becomes involved in a battle between mortals and demons. The sequel builds on the engine from Kingmaker to address concerns raised by critics and players, and expands additional rulesets from the tabletop game, including new character classes and the mythic progression system. Owlcat launched a Kickstarter campaign in February 2020 to raise additional development funds for the title. The Kickstarter successfully raised over US$2 million of its requested US$300,000, allowing for several stretch goals to be added during development.
