= Owlcat Games =

Video game developer

- Industry: Video games
- Founded: June 8, 2016; 10 years ago
- Founder: Alexander Mishulin; Oleg Shpilchevsky
- Headquarters: Paphos, Cyprus
- Key people: Oleg Shpilchevskiy; Alexander Mishulin
- Products: Pathfinder video games Warhammer 40,000: Rogue Trader
- Number of employees: 600
- Parent: My.Games (2016–2019)
- Website: owlcat.games

Owlcat Games is a video game developer founded in 2016 by Oleg Shpilchevskiy and Alexander Mishulin. It is headquartered in Cyprus, with a satellite office in Armenia. It is best known for developing computer role-playing games such as Pathfinder: Kingmaker (2018), its successor, Pathfinder: Wrath of the Righteous (2021), and Warhammer 40,000: Rogue Trader (2023).

== History ==
Owlcat Games was founded in 2016 in Moscow by game developers who had previously worked on titles such as Heroes of Might and Magic V, Silent Storm and Etherlords, and massively multiplayer online role-playing games (MMORPG) such as Allods Online and Skyforge. After working extensively on MMORPGs, the studio pivoted to create single-player role-playing video games. Partnering with Paizo and publisher Deep Silver, the studio's first game, Pathfinder: Kingmaker, was partly funded through Kickstarter and released in 2018. It received criticisms for its technical issues, and Owlcat spent months introducing patches and free updates to the game.

Initially a studio within My.Games, Owlcat raised $1 million in funding from investment firm Gem Capital in December 2019 for the development of another Pathfinder game, and became an independent studio. The sequel, Pathfinder: Wrath of the Righteous, once again partly funded through Kickstarter, was released in late 2021 and sold more than 1 million copies. The company's most recent game, Warhammer 40,000: Rogue Trader, was released in December 2023.

In June 2025, Owlcat announced they were developing a new role-playing video game set in the universe of The Expanse novels and TV series titled The Expanse: Osiris Reborn. The game will feature an original story, third-person tactical combat, a customizable captain, and romances with ally characters.

== Games developed ==
Year	Title	Platform(s)
2018	Pathfinder: Kingmaker	Microsoft Windows, macOS, Linux, PlayStation 4, Xbox One
2021	Pathfinder: Wrath of the Righteous	Microsoft Windows, macOS, PlayStation 4, Xbox One, Nintendo Switch
2023	Warhammer 40,000: Rogue Trader	Microsoft Windows, macOS, PlayStation 5, Xbox Series X/S, Nintendo Switch 2
2027	Warhammer 40,000: Dark Heresy	Microsoft Windows, PlayStation 5, Xbox Series X/S, Nintendo Switch 2
2027	The Expanse: Osiris Reborn	Microsoft Windows, PlayStation 5, Xbox Series X/S

== Games published ==
Year	Title	Developer	Platform(s)
2025	Rue Valley	Emotion Spark Studio	Microsoft Windows, macOS, Linux, Nintendo Switch, PlayStation 5, Xbox Series X/S
2027	Shadow of the Road	Another Angle Games	Microsoft Windows
