= Pathfinder: Wrath of the Righteous =

2021 video game

- Developer: Owlcat Games
- Publisher: META Publishing
- Director: Alexander Mishulin
- Designer: Alexander Mishulin
- Programmer: Alexey Drobyshevsky
- Artist: Vlad Konstantinov
- Writers: Alexander Komzolov; Chris Avellone
- Composers: Dmitry V. Silantyev; Mikhail Kotov; Pawel Perepelica; Dryante; Sergey Eybog
- Engine: Unity
- Platforms: macOS; Microsoft Windows; Nintendo Switch (cloud); PlayStation 4; PlayStation 5; Xbox One
- Release: macOS, Windows 2 September 2021 Switch, PS4, Xbox One 29 September 2022 PS5 30 March 2024
- Genre: Role-playing
- Mode: Single-player

Pathfinder: Wrath of the Righteous is an isometric role-playing game developed by Owlcat Games and published by META Publishing, based on Paizo Publishing's Pathfinder franchise. Announced through a Kickstarter campaign in February 2020, the game was released for Microsoft Windows and macOS on 2 September 2021. The game was released for PlayStation 4 and Xbox One on 29 September 2022 alongside a cloud-based version for Nintendo Switch.

== Plot ==
The Worldwound is a magical chasm that allows demons to travel from their home dimension to the mortal world, where they maraud and do great evil. The country of Mendev has fought a series of wars against these demons, called Crusades. The Crusades have been slowly losing ground, primarily because demons killed in the mortal world return to life in their home realm.

The player-character is found outside of the Mendevian city of Kenabres. They survive a demonic surprise-attack, then discover that they have strange magical "mythic powers" from an unknown source. After leading a counterattack to drive the demons from Kenabres, the player-character is appointed Commander of the Fifth Crusade by Mendevian royalty, Queen Galfrey.

The Commander deploys armies against the demonic forces while trying to figure out how to close the Worldwound. They recruit various individuals to their party, and eventually retake all land save the Worldwound itself. Their mythic powers grow, setting them onto one of several "mythic paths" such as becoming an angel, trickster or lich. The chosen mythic path significantly affects the Commander's abilities, leadership style, and personal fate.

The Commander learns that their mythic powers come from an experiment conducted on them by Areelu Vorlesh, a half-demon mad scientist who created the Worldwound. Vorlesh attempted to place her murdered child's soul in the young Commander's body, but ended up creating the source of the mythic power. Vorlesh then erased the Commander's memory of her interference. The mythic source was activated by the stress of the attack on Kenabres and fueled by the Commander's battles with powerful beings. After learning this, the Commander can choose to abandon their mythic powers, becoming a "Mortal Legend".

Vorlesh tells the Commander that the Worldwound is bound to their two souls, and that one of them must die in the chasm for it to close. The two battle near an entrance to the Worldwound. Vorlesh is defeated and attempts to commit suicide out of spite, but can be talked down. The Commander can then choose to push Vorlesh into the Worldwound (if she is still alive), jump in themself, or use various other solutions based on their mythic path. If the Worldwound is closed, Mendev and the region are finally peaceful. However, some mythic paths can co-opt the Worldwound for their own purposes.

There is a secret ending that requires specific actions and research throughout the game. The Commander learns more about Vorlesh's experiments and realizes that she is trying to become a demigoddess. The Commander gathers the materials and knowledge necessary for this goal, and finally completes it after defeating Vorlesh, gaining more power and near-immortality. They can choose to do it alone, or let Vorlesh and/or their party members also become demigods.

== Development ==
The game is a sequel to Pathfinder: Kingmaker, the previous role-playing game of the same developer, but it does not follow the same story. The sequel builds on the engine from Kingmaker to address concerns raised by critics and players, and expands additional rulesets from the tabletop game, includes new character classes and the mythic progression system. Owlcat launched a Kickstarter campaign in February 2020 to raise additional development funds for the title. The Kickstarter successfully raised over US$2 million of its requested US$300,000, allowing for several stretch goals to be added during development. Like its predecessor, Wrath of the Righteous follows an Adventure Path of the same name, which was originally published in August 2013.

=== Downloadable content ===
Six major pieces of downloadable content have been released for Pathfinder: Wrath of the Righteous. The first DLC, Inevitable Excess, was released on 3 March 2022. In it, the Commander is trapped in another dimension by a "keeper of magic" who believes their mythic powers violate the laws of the universe. The second DLC, Through the Ashes, was released on 21 April 2022. This story follows a group of ordinary people trying to survive the demonic attack on Kenabres. The third DLC, The Treasure of the Midnight Isles, was released on 30 August 2022. It is a rogue-like campaign where the party searches for a mysterious treasure in the Abyss. The first and third DLCs can be played on their own or incorporated into the main campaign, while the second can only be played standalone. The fourth DLC, The Last Sarkorians, was released on 7 March 2023. This DLC adds a new playable class with 6 archetype variations, a new companion, and a new area. The fifth DLC, The Lord Of Nothing, a sequel to Through the Ashes, was released on 21 November 2023. This DLC also adds 15 new archetypes, new spells and new feats for the main campaign. The sixth and last DLC, A Dance of Masks, released on 13 June 2024. It included new personal events for each companion, including romantic events, a fully voiced adventure set in Kenabres and beyond, an arena, and 11 new character archetypes.

== Reception ==
Reception

Aggregate score
Aggregator	Score
Metacritic	PC: 83/100; PS4: 80/100; XONE: 79/100

Review scores
Publication	Score
IGN	8/10
PC Gamer (US)	76/100
Push Square	9/10
RPGFan	78/100
Shacknews	8/10
VentureBeat	4/5

Pathfinder: Wrath of the Righteous received "generally favorable" reviews according to review aggregator Metacritic. Writing for IGN, Rowan Kaiser praised the game's story and technical improvements over its predecessor, but expressed disappointment with the military management aspects. Jody Macgregor of PC Gamer proclaimed the game is "well worth your time", but criticized its inconsistent writing quality.

During the 25th Annual D.I.C.E. Awards, the Academy of Interactive Arts & Sciences nominated Wrath of the Righteous for "Role-Playing Game of the Year".

By January 2023, the game had sold one million copies worldwide.

=== Controversy ===
On 24 July 2023, update 2.1.5m was launched which among other things added the third-party analytics program AppsFlyer. The game's community sent heavy backlash due to concerns over privacy, lack of transparency, and the mandatory acceptance of an updated EULA. This was resolved the next day on 25 July 2023 with update 2.1.5n, which removed AppsFlyer.
