= Art of Rally =

2020 video game

- Developer: Funselektor Labs
- Publishers: Funselektor Labs; Noodlecake Studios (iOS, Android)
- Designer: Dune Casu
- Programmers: Dune Casu; Adrian Tosello; Perren Spence-Pearse
- Artists: Dune Casu; Jamie Churchman
- Composer: Slava Korystov
- Engine: Unity
- Platforms: Windows; macOS; Linux; PlayStation 4; PlayStation 5; Xbox One; Xbox Series X/S; Nintendo Switch; iOS; Android
- Release: September 23, 2020; Xbox One & X/S, Switch; August 12, 2021; PS4, PS5; October 6, 2021; iOS, Android; January 18, 2024
- Genre: Racing
- Mode: Single-player

Art of Rally (stylized as art of rally) is a racing video game developed and published by Funselektor Labs. The game was released on September 23, 2020 for Windows, macOS, and Linux; on August 12, 2021 for Xbox One, Xbox Series X/S, and Nintendo Switch; on October 6, 2021 for PlayStation 4 and PlayStation 5; and on January 18, 2024 ports for iOS and Android published by Noodlecake were released. Art of Rally is set during the golden era of rally, in an alternate timeline where Group B was never discontinued. Players compete in rallies, unlocking classes and cars as they progress through the game.

Art of Rally received generally favorable reviews for Windows and Xbox, while the Switch version received mixed reviews.

== Gameplay ==
Art of Rally is a racing game played in a top-down perspective. The game is set in the "golden era of rally", featuring rally cars from groups such as Group 2, Group B, Group A, and Group S. The game takes place in an alternate timeline where Group B was never discontinued. Art of Rally has a career mode and a free roam mode. Career mode starts with Group 2, and progression is made by completing rallies. Players unlock new rally classes and cars as they progress through career mode. Cars can be damaged, which affects their performance. Free roam allows players to use any previously unlocked cars, and also contain collectibles for players to collect. The game has online events, taking the form of daily and weekly challenges that players can participate in.

== Development ==
Dune Casu was creating a prototype of the game while working on the console ports of Absolute Drift, but full development of the game started in 2017. Casu wanted to use what worked in Absolute Drift by refining the controls and making a "bigger, better, and more powerful" experience. Funselektor Labs released an announcement trailer for Art of Rally on May 15, 2019. The game was featured at EGX 2019, showing off content and gameplay. A free public demo of the game was released for PC on March 27, 2020. Funselektor later released a gameplay trailer on August 19, presenting a new handling system and new vehicles.

During development, Funselektor Labs partnered with porting company Do Games. The game was supposed to launch on consoles with PC on September 23, 2020, but were unable to so due to the small size of team at the start of 2020. Art of Rally developer Dune Casu stated that it was a "big effort" to get more developers and producers "just to finish the PC version". However, Casu referred to it as a "blessing in disguise", allowing the team to improve and update the PC version of the game.

According to Casu, the visuals of the game was meant to be a "minimalistic take on nature". The 2016 puzzle game The Witness was a source of inspiration for Casu, with the developer stating that he was "enamoured" by the game's colors and vegetation.

Art of Rally first released on Microsoft Windows, MacOS, and Linux on September 23, 2020. Art of Rally later released on Xbox One, Xbox Series X/S. and Nintendo Switch on August 12, 2021. The game was also added to the Xbox Game Pass library the same day. Art of Rally's console release included an update that added a map set in Kenya. The update also added more vehicles, songs, and stages. PlayStation 4 and PlayStation 5 versions of Art of Rally were released on October 6, 2021.

On May 12, 2022, Serenity Forge announced that it would be producing physical copies of the game for PlayStation 4, PlayStation 5, and Nintendo Switch. On the same day, Funselektor Labs released a trailer that announced a free update for Art of Rally to include six more tracks set in Indonesia. The Indonesia update released on September 22, 2022, and the physical versions released on January 24, 2023.

== Reception ==
Reception

Aggregate scores
Aggregator	Score
Metacritic	PC: 79/100 (Note: Score based on 15 reviews); XSXS: 80/100 (Note: Score based on 6 reviews); NS: 74/100 (Note: Score based on 8 reviews)
OpenCritic	86% recommend

Review scores
Publication	Score
Eurogamer	Recommended
Nintendo Life	8/10
Push Square	7/10
VideoGamer.com	8/10

Art of Rally received "generally favorable" reviews for PC and Xbox Series X/S, according to review aggregator Metacritic. The Nintendo Switch version received "mixed or average" reviews. Fellow review aggregator OpenCritic assessed that the game received strong approval, being recommended by 86% of critics.

Martin Robinson of Eurogamer recommended the game, referring to it as "brilliantly playable" and "arrestingly stylish". Robinson praised the cars' visuals and game's soundtrack, calling the latter "decent".

Ollie Reynolds from Nintendo Life rated the game 8/10 stars, praising the authenticity and challenge of the gameplay, the visual style, and the variety of content in the game. However, Reynolds felt that there were notable visual downgrades and frame rate issues on the Nintendo Switch version.

Push Square's Brett Posner-Ferdman rated the game 7/10 stars, commending the visual style and atmosphere, stating that they "stand out". He enjoyed the free roam and praised the rallying experience, calling it "solid". Brett wrote that the environment felt "copy-pasted" at times, and criticized the "constant" object pop-in.

VideoGamer.com reviewer Josh Wise gave the game an 8/10, describing it as "the video game as essay".
