= Anima (role-playing game) =

Tabletop role-playing game

Anima is a tabletop role-playing franchise developed by Spain-based company Anima Game Studio. The fantasy setting of Anima is called Gaïa. Anima draws significant inspiration from Japanese role-playing video games like Final Fantasy, Dragon Quest and Suikoden. The game combines elements of Eastern fantasy, such as manga-like art, honor codes, mysticism, and martial arts, with elements of Western fantasy, such as medieval arms.

== Tabletop games ==
=== Anima: Beyond Fantasy ===
Anima: Beyond Fantasy cover

The tabletop role-playing game that started the franchise was originally published by Edge Entertainment in 2005.

==== Translations ====
A French translation was published in France in 2007 by UbIK, a French company that merged with Edge Entertainment. An English translation of Anima was published in October 2008 by the American company Fantasy Flight Games (FFG) and is still included in FFG's games catalog.

The English version of Anima: Beyond Fantasy was originally scheduled for release in August 2006. However, despite several announced release dates, the game was not made available to the public. Finally, the game was launched at Gen-Con Indy, with a full release following in October 2008. On June 28, 2010, Fantasy Flight Games published the core rules in PDF format on DriveThruRPG. However, it was removed from DriveThruRPG on May 26, 2016.

==== Supplements ====
English release dates are included.

- Anima: Beyond Fantasy (August 2008, PDF format June 2010)
- Game Master's Toolkit (August 2009)
- Gaïa Volume 1: Beyond the Dreams! (June 2010)
- Dominus Exxet: Dominion of Ki (July 2011)
- Those Who Walked Among Us (16 September 2011)
- Arcana Exxet: Secrets of the Supernatural (25 July 2012)
- Prometheum Exxet (17 June 2013)
- Character Folder
- Character Diary (Male)
- Character Diary (Female)
- Core Exxet (Revamped core book) (No English release)
- Gaïa Volume 2: Beyond the Mirror (No English release)

==== Reception ====
Reviews:

- Rebel Times #16

=== Anima: Tactics ===
Anima: Tactics is a 32mm miniatures game set in the Anima universe, produced and distributed by the U.S. company Cipher Studios. The game is played with individual characters and advantage cards each worth a certain number of points.

==== Miniatures ====
All Anima: Tactics characters have a side (Light, Dark, or Neutral) and a faction.

===== Limited Edition Miniatures =====
Anima: Tactics is not a collectible game, but some characters have a limited edition variant in addition to their standard pose. Cipher Studios has released two limited edition variants so far, Celia and Khaine-D'Lacreu. The Limited Edition of Celia has been a sought-after collectible since it sold out and has fetched prices of up to $100 in online auctions.

==== International Competition ====
Since 2008, a US National Championship has been held each year at Gen Con in Indianapolis.

From 2007 to 2014, annual European and German Championships took place at Dreieich Con near Frankfurt, Germany. As of 2015, the European Championships take place in Bonn, Germany.

=== Anima: The Card Game ===
The card games are non-collectible and are intended for three to four people (five with expansion). The original English edition of Shadow of Omega has been reissued with errata and new card material to adapt it to future releases.

==== Expansions ====
- Shadow of Omega
- Shadow of Omega Revised
- Beyond Good and Evil
- The Twilight of the Gods

== Video games ==
=== Anima: Ark of Sinners ===
Anima: Ark of Sinners
- Developer: Anima Game Studio
- Publisher: Anima Game Studio
- Platform: WiiWare
- Release: EU: 7 July 2011; NA: 27 October 2011
- Genre: Platform
- Mode: Single-player

Anima: Ark of Sinners is a platform video game developed and published by Anima Game Studio exclusively for Wii.

==== Reception ====
Reception

Aggregate score
Aggregator	Score
Metacritic	32/100

Review scores
Publication	Score
Eurogamer	2/10
GamesMaster	25%
IGN	5.5/10
NGamer	20%
Nintendo Life	4/10 stars

Anima: Ark of Sinners received "unfavorable" reviews, according to review aggregator Metacritic.

=== Anima: Gate of Memories ===
Anima: Gate of Memories is an action role-playing video game developed by Anima Project and published by Badland Games for Linux, Microsoft Windows, OS X, PlayStation 4, Xbox One, and Nintendo Switch in 2016. The game received "mixed" reviews, according to review aggregator website Metacritic.
