= Sergey Orlovskiy =

Russian businessman and game designer

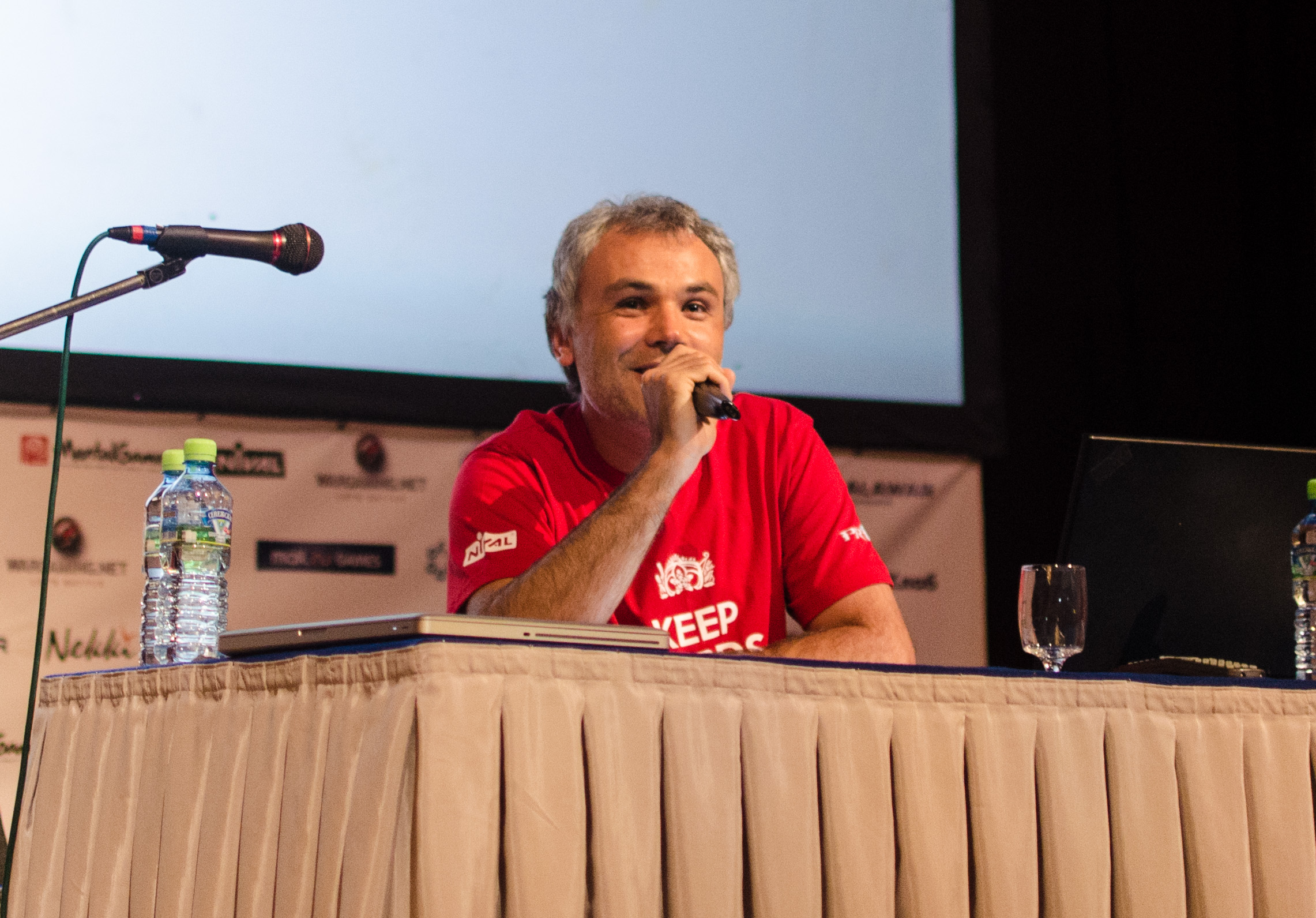
- Born: September 15, 1972 (age 54); Magadan, Russian SFSR, Soviet Union
- Education: Moscow State University (1994)
- Known for: Founder and CEO of Nival Networks

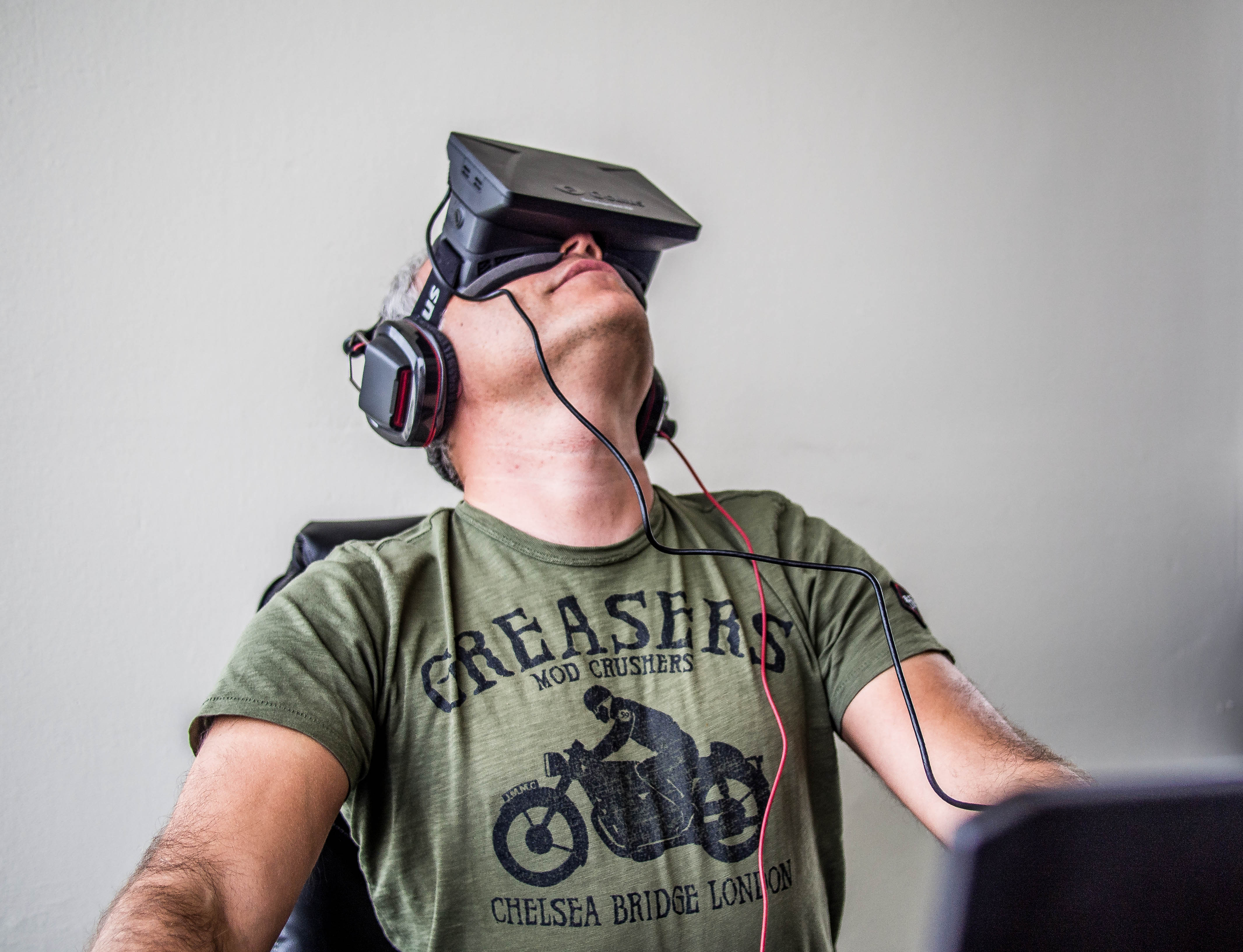
Sergey Orlovskiy in 2012 wearing a prototype Oculus Rift

Sergey Orlovskiy (Russian: Сергей Орловский) is the founder and CEO of Nival, one of the oldest game development companies in Eastern Europe.

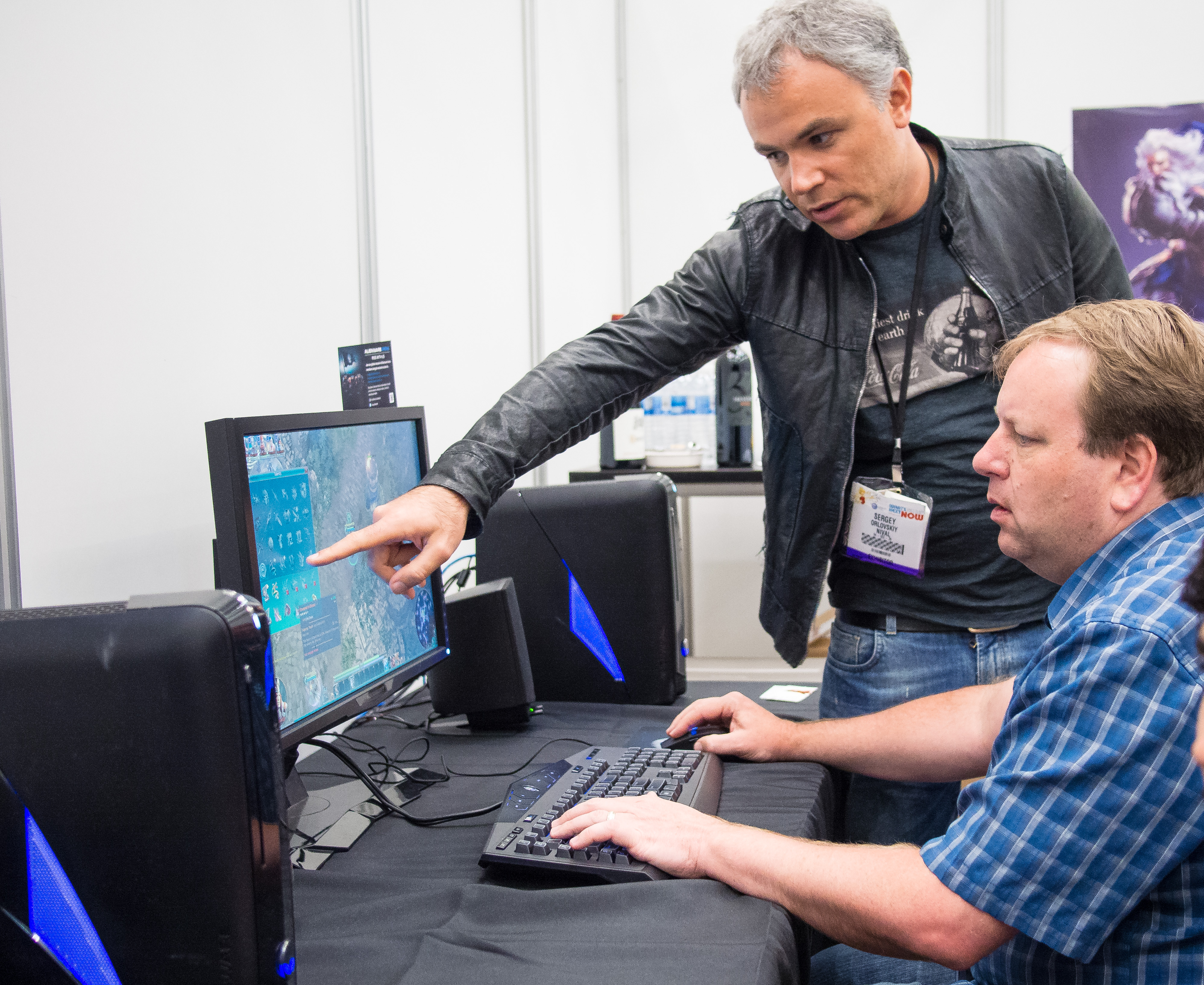
Sergey Orlovskiy with Feargus Urquhart at E3 2013

== Early life ==
Sergey Orlovskiy was born in Magadan, Russia, on September 15, 1972.

== Nival history ==
Nival was founded in 1996 as a PC game developer of stand-alone games. It started to self-publish games in 2005.

In 2006, Orlovskiy created the Nival spin-off named Nival Online and raised US $20 million from Digital Sky Technologies (DST) to focus on online game development and publishing. In 2008, Nival Online was merged with Astrum and in 2009 sold to Mail.ru under the Astrum Nival name, to be integrated into the Mail.ru games division. This game development group inside Mail.ru is still referred to as the Allods Team after Allods Online.

In 2010, Digital Sky Technologies and 1C invested US$5 million to acquire a minority stake in Nival.

In 2013, Nival raised US$6 million in its Series A funding round led by Almaz Capital. Almaz Capital exited Nival’s shareholder structure in 2024.

== Recognition ==
Orlovskiy typically gives a keynote at the Russian Games Developers Conference KRI. In his speech "Playing with God" in 2009, he predicted the start of cross-platform gaming as a frontier and a challenge for the game industry.

In 2009, Orlovskiy was included in Top 20 influential people in MMO of 2009 by MOG.

In 2012, Orlovskiy was appointed by the Ministry of Communications and Mass Media to an Expert Council on the development of the IT industry in the Russian Federation.

In 2015, Orlovskiy was called the most famous person in the Russian/CIS gaming industry.

== Personal life ==
As of 2016 he was living in Limassol, Cyprus.

== Games ==
Sergey Orlovskiy is credited on the following games:

- Sea Legends (1996) - Programmer
- Rage of Mages (1998) - Executive Producer and Design
- Rage of Mages II: Necromancer (1999) - Executive Producer and Game Design
- Evil Islands: Curse of the Lost Soul (2000) - Executive Producer and Game Design
- Etherlords (2001) - Executive Producer, Conception and Game Design
- Blitzkrieg (2003) - Executive Producer and Game Design
- Silent Storm (2003) - Executive Producer
- Silent Storm: Sentinels (2004) - Executive Producer
- Blitzkrieg: Rolling Thunder (2004) - Executive Producer and Game Design
- Blitzkrieg: Burning Horizon (2004) - Executive Producer and Game Design
- Blitzkrieg 2 (2005) - Executive Producer
- Hammer & Sickle (2005) - Producer
- Night Watch (2005) - Producer
- Heroes of Might and Magic V (2006) - Executive Producer
- Heroes of Might and Magic V: Hammers of Fate (2006) - Executive Producer
- Blitzkrieg 2: Fall of the Reich (2006) - Executive Producer
- Blitzkrieg 2: Liberation (2007) - Executive Producer
- Heroes of Might and Magic V: Tribes of the East (2007) - Executive Producer
- Entis Fantasy (2007) - Executive Producer
- Allods Online (2009) - General Producer
- King's Bounty: Legions (2011) - Executive Producer
- Prime World (2012) - Executive Producer
- Prime World: Emaki (2012) - Executive Producer
- Prime World: Alchemy (2012) - Executive Producer
- Prime World: Defenders (2013) - Executive Producer
- Etherlords (2014) - Executive Producer
- InMind (2015) - Executive Producer
- Defenders 2 (in development) - Executive Producer
- Blitzkrieg 3 - Executive Producer
