= Nival (company) =

Video game developer and publisher

- Formerly: Nival Entertainment, Nival Interactive, Nival Network
- Type: Private
- Industry: Video games
- Founded: 1996; 30 years ago in Moscow, Russia
- Founder: Sergey Orlovskiy
- Headquarters: Limassol, Cyprus
- Area served: Worldwide
- Key people: Sergey Orlovskiy (CEO)
- Products: Rage of Mages series Etherlords series Blitzkrieg series Silent Storm series Heroes of Might and Magic V Prime World
- Website: nival.com

Nival is an independent video game developer and publisher. It was founded in 1996 in Moscow by Sergey Orlovskiy, who became the company's chief executive officer. The company has also operated under the names Nival Entertainment and Nival Interactive, and had the subsidiaries Nival Online and Nival Network. Since 2016 it has been headquartered in Limassol, Cyprus.

The company is best known for the Allods series (released in the West as Rage of Mages), Evil Islands, Etherlords, Blitzkrieg, Silent Storm, Heroes of Might and Magic V, which it developed for Ubisoft, and the multiplayer online battle arena game Prime World. Its online division, Nival Online, created the MMORPG Allods Online and was fully acquired by Mail.Ru in 2010. Since 2024, Nival has been releasing the source code of its older games under a non-commercial license.

== History ==
=== Founding and Allods (1996–1999) ===
Sergey Orlovskiy studied at the Faculty of Computational Mathematics and Cybernetics of Moscow State University and, while still a student, worked on the games Russian Six Pack and Sea Legends (Morskie legendy) for the company Mir-Dialog. In his final year he and his friends came up with the role-playing strategy game Allods, and he spent a long time looking for funding; according to him, "few believed that an idea from some students could bring serious profit". The only company willing to back the project was Buka, which invested $250,000 in development but asked Orlovskiy to set up the team as an independent company. Nival was thus founded in November 1996, initially with six employees.

Allods: The Seal of Mystery was released in 1998 and became a major hit in Russia, but because of widespread piracy the domestic market could not recoup development costs, and Orlovskiy had planned to enter the Western market from the start. The game's first American publisher was SSI, which withdrew from the project because of financial problems; the game was eventually released in the United States as Rage of Mages by Monolith Productions. A sequel, Rage of Mages II: Necromancer, followed a year later.

=== Strategy games of the early 2000s (2000–2004) ===
In 2000 Nival released Evil Islands, a 3D role-playing game set in the Allods universe; in 2001, Etherlords, which combined strategy with collectible card game mechanics; and in 2003, the World War II strategy game Blitzkrieg, Etherlords II and the tactical role-playing game Silent Storm. For the latter the company built its own 3D engine, the Silent Storm engine, which was used in its subsequent projects. By 2005 Nival had 140 employees, and according to Moscow State University the total sales of its games exceeded 5 million copies.

=== Ener1 deal (2005–2007) ===
In April 2005 a controlling stake in Nival Interactive was acquired by the American holding company Ener1 Group; the price was not disclosed, but according to Orlovskiy it was about $10 million. Kommersant called it the first acquisition of a Russian video game developer by a foreign company. A US corporation, Nival, Inc., was set up with headquarters in Florida, and Ener1 planned to use the Moscow team to develop games for next-generation consoles and mobile devices. In autumn 2005 Nival began publishing games in Russia, the CIS and the Baltic states.

The plans to enter the console market did not materialize. Orlovskiy later explained that the company had remained in the developer–publisher model and that its American team had not helped it build a track record as a console developer. In 2005 Nival Interactive reported revenue of 37.4 million rubles and a net loss of 18.7 million rubles. In November 2007 Orlovskiy regained control of the company: according to him, Ener1 had paid no more than 40% of the agreed price, and the holding's debt was converted into shares that passed to the founder. The Los Angeles office was then closed and the headquarters moved back to Moscow.

=== Heroes of Might and Magic V (2003–2007) ===
After Ubisoft bought the rights to the Might and Magic franchise from the bankrupt 3DO Company, Nival was among the first studios to put itself forward to develop the fifth Heroes of Might and Magic game. The contract was signed in November 2003; all rights to the game and the series remained with the publisher, which had the final say on all narrative matters. Nival proposed making the game fully 3D using its own engine; according to Nival's creative director Aleksandr Mishulin, Ubisoft oversaw every stage of development. The publisher rejected the first prototype, finding its visual style too "cartoonish", and the game's final look was approved in autumn 2004.

Heroes of Might and Magic V was released in 2006. Nival developed two expansions for it, Hammers of Fate (2006) and Tribes of the East (2007). In 2024 the game was inducted into the Russian Video Game Industry Hall of Fame.

=== Online games: Nival Online and Astrum (2006–2010) ===
After the release of Heroes of Might and Magic V, Orlovskiy moved a large part of the team to multiplayer games. In October 2006 the online division was spun off as Nival Online, in which American investors put $20 million, with Orlovskiy as president. The company's first project was the mobile multiplayer game Entis Online, made together with MegaFon, but its main effort went into an MMORPG set in the Allods universe.

In December 2007 Nival Online merged with IT Territory, TimeZero and Nikita Online to form the holding company Astrum Online Entertainment, and in July 2009 it was renamed Astrum Nival. The budget of Allods Online was $12 million; according to Orlovskiy, the game paid for itself before its official launch through international licensing deals.

In December 2009 Mail.Ru announced the acquisition of Astrum Online Entertainment, and in February 2010 it bought Orlovskiy's stake in Astrum Nival (about 30%, according to BFM.ru), taking full ownership of the studio. The studio continued to operate under the Mail.Ru brand (later as Allods Team), and its head, Dmitry Devishev, became Mail.Ru's vice president for client game development.

=== Nival Network and Prime World (2008–2014) ===
In September 2008 Orlovskiy founded Nival Network, focused on strategy and social online games. In December 2009 it launched its own gaming network, ZZima.com, through which, besides its own projects, it operated licensed games, including Cabal Online from February 2010. In April 2011 Nival Interactive and Nival Network merged under the single Nival brand.

Nival Network's main project was Prime World, a session-based strategy game built on DotA mechanics and supplemented by a "castle" with economic strategy elements, social network integration and gender-based division of characters. Its budget was initially estimated at $5 million, and by November 2010 it had grown to $8 million, making it one of the most expensive projects in the history of the Russian video game industry after Allods Online. Prime World won several awards at E3 2011 (see Awards); its open beta began on March 30, 2012, and the full release followed in 2014. Nival released several mobile and casual spin-offs set in the Prime World universe, the most successful of which was Prime World: Defenders. The first Prime World tournament was held in 2013. The game's servers were shut down on March 31, 2021.

In December 2013 Nival raised $6 million in a funding round led by Almaz Capital. In 2014 it released a mobile version of Etherlords, which Apple named one of the best games of the year.

=== Blitzkrieg 3 and the move to Cyprus (2015–2022) ===
In July 2015 the company's head office moved from Moscow to Saint Petersburg, and in July 2016 the headquarters relocated to Limassol in order to focus on global markets. In December 2016 the company closed its ZZima gaming network.

The main project of this period was Blitzkrieg 3, an online World War II strategy game that entered Steam early access in May 2015 and was released on June 2, 2017. In February 2017 Nival announced that it had created the world's first neural network-based AI for a real-time strategy game, "General Boris", which, according to the company, played at the level of top players without using information hidden from a human. Rock Paper Shotgun disputed the "first" claim, noting that 2010's Supreme Commander 2 had also advertised the use of neural networks. The online multiplayer of Blitzkrieg 3 was shut down on December 14, 2022; the single-player campaign and battles against the AI remained available.

=== Luden.io ===
Nival had a research and development group led by Oleg Chumakov, which began experimenting with the Oculus Rift headset in 2013. It grew into the Nival VR division, which in 2015 released the free educational VR games InMind and InCell; together they passed one million installs in their first year. In autumn 2016 Nival VR was renamed Luden.io and spun off as a separate company specializing in educational games involving virtual reality and artificial intelligence. In October 2016 the venture fund Sistema VC invested 65 million rubles in the new company. In 2018 the studio released While True: learn(), a simulation game about a machine learning specialist.

=== Shareholder exits and source code releases (2024–present) ===
In May 2024 Almaz Capital Partners and 1C ceased to be shareholders of Nival.

Starting in September 2024, the company has been publishing the source code of its older games on GitHub under a special license that prohibits commercial use but permits study, research and modding:

- September 2024 – the code of the session (battle) part of Prime World; the player community used it to launch the revival project Prime World: Nova;
- April 2025 – the single-player code of Blitzkrieg;
- September 2025 – the engine code, scripts and assets of Blitzkrieg 2;
- February 2026 – the code of Silent Storm, including the engine, Lua scripts and the map editor; the third-party Bink Video and FMOD libraries were excluded from the release.

== Games ==
- Rage of Mages (Allods: The Seal of Mystery, 1998)
- Rage of Mages II: Necromancer (1999)
- Evil Islands: Curse of the Lost Soul (2000)
- Etherlords (2001)
- Blitzkrieg (2003)
  - Blitzkrieg: Burning Horizon and other expansions and stand-alone add-ons
- Etherlords II (2003)
- Silent Storm (2003)
  - Silent Storm: Sentinels (2004)
  - Hammer & Sickle (2005)
- Blitzkrieg 2 (2005)
  - Blitzkrieg 2: Fall of the Reich
  - Blitzkrieg 2: Liberation
- Night Watch (2005)
- Heroes of Might and Magic V (2006) – for Ubisoft
  - Heroes of Might and Magic V: Hammers of Fate (2006)
  - Heroes of Might and Magic V: Tribes of the East (2007)
- Day Watch (2006) – with Targem Studio
- Great Battles series (2007) – with Arise and N-Game Studios, including Frontline: Fields of Thunder
- Allods Online (2009) – Nival Online / Astrum Nival
- King's Bounty: Legions (2011)
- Prime World (2014; open beta from 2012)
- Prime World: Alchemy (2012)
- Prime World: Defenders (2013)
- Etherlords (2014) – with Targem Games
- InMind VR and InCell VR (2015) – Nival VR
- Prime World: Defenders 2 (2016)
- Blitzkrieg 3 (2017; early access from 2015)

== Awards ==
- Prime World:
  - "Best Online Game" and "Best Game Design" at the KRI Awards 2011
  - "Best Strategy Game of E3 2011" by IGN
  - "Best Social Game of Gamescom" by GamingXP
  - "Best of E3 2011" by GameFront
  - "Biggest Surprise of E3 2011" by GamesRadar+
  - "Best Russian-language Online Game" at Perpetuum Mob 2012
  - "Best Russian Game of 2012" by Igromania
  - "Best Russian Game of 2012" by StopGame.ru
  - "Best Strategy Game of E3 2013" by FleshEatingZipper
  - "Best MOBA of E3 2013" by RTSGuru
- King's Bounty: Legions, a social and mobile entry in the King's Bounty series:
  - "Best Social Game" at the KRI Awards 2011
  - Perpetuum Mob 2013: "Best Mobile Online Game" – Pro vote
  - Perpetuum Mob 2013: "Best Mobile Online Game" – user vote, 2nd place
  - Facebook Game of the Year 2013 – Staff Pick
  - Computer Times – Editors' Choice
- Heroes of Might and Magic V:
  - Winner of the "Legendary Games" category; inducted into the Russian Video Game Industry Hall of Fame in 2024
- Etherlords (2014 mobile version):
  - One of Apple's Best Games of 2014
  - Apple Editors' Choice in 122 countries

== Tournaments ==
- 2006 – the first official Heroes of Might and Magic V tournament
- 2013 – the first Prime World tournament
