= Silent Storm =

2003 video game

- European cover art
- Developer: Nival Interactive
- Publishers: RU: 1C Company; EU: JoWooD Productions; NA: Encore Software
- Designer: Dmitry "Zak" Zakharov
- Engine: Silent Storm engine
- Platform: Microsoft Windows
- Release: RU: August 22, 2003; EU: November 7, 2003; NA: January 20, 2004
- Genres: Turn-based tactics, tactical RPG
- Mode: Single-player

Silent Storm (Note: Russian: Операция Silent Storm) is a 2003 turn-based tactics video game developed by Nival Interactive and published by JoWooD. The game is set in a fictionalized World War II Europe with science fiction elements.

An advanced game engine, the Silent Storm engine, was developed for the game and reused in several later titles. Silent Storm was followed by the expansion Silent Storm: Sentinels in 2004. A third game taking place in the same setting, Hammer & Sickle, was co-developed by Novik&Co and released in 2005. A Gold edition containing both the original game and the expansion was released in Europe later that same year.

On 15 February 2026 the source code became officially available, for non-commercial usage, according to the Facebook post of Sergey Orlovskiy.

== Gameplay ==
An in-game screenshot showing troops and Panzerkleins

The player commands a team of up to six elite soldiers on the Axis or Allied side, undertaking a variety of missions. Once the player begins a campaign, they may select a premade character or create their own to lead the team through the game. Once the introductory mission is complete, the player can access a base complete with a medical station, armoury, personnel, and a panzerklein hangar. From this point, the player may select a team of six characters from a pool of 20. Each character has a role such as medic, sniper, scout, grenadier, soldier or engineer. Each role has different advantages and liabilities in battle. As the player progresses through the game, the armoury will receive new weapons for the player to use, either stolen from enemies or contributed from their own forces.

Silent Storm depicts a wide variety of the authentic weaponry and equipment of circa 1943 with great detail. Mixed into otherwise realistic elements is a plot that features secret weapon projects reminiscent of spy-fi, including energy weapons. Most notable are the Panzerkleins (pseudo-German for "little tanks"), crude powered armour suits.

The game features a remarkably advanced physics model. Nearly all structures are completely destructible. This has many tactical effects in the combat. For instance, if a character hears an enemy moving in an adjacent room, they can simply fire through the wall to attack them. Silent Storm also employs ragdoll physics for bodies according to the precise velocity of an impact. Fully three-dimensional mapping allows for obstruction calculations and cover effects from all angles. Bullets ricochet and their stopping power depends on the weapon. The effects are exaggerated for a more cinematic experience (a hail of non-fatal bullets only make the target shake, but a single fatal bullet can send the target flying).

== Plot ==
The game's story takes place during World War II in an alternate history. Thor's Hammer Organization (THO) is a shadowy organization with connections all over Europe and the goal of world domination. THO knows that this goal cannot be attained while there are powers capable of challenging them, and aims to use its connections and advanced technology to make sure the two sides of World War II devastate each other, while THO makes a grab for power when both are exhausted. The obvious influence of Norse mythology on the organization's name is further shown by the fact that all THO members use a mythological name as their call sign.

In exchange for the services of both Allied and Axis higher-ups, Thor's Hammer provides them with some of their inventions, including Panzerkleins. Panzerkleins are difficult to destroy, as they are essentially immune to small arms fire.

== Development ==
Silent Storm was developed by Nival Interactive, a Moscow-based studio previously responsible for the Allods (Rage of Mages) series. The game's showing at E3 2003 won it the "E3 2003 Best of Show" award in the tactical genre from Wargamer. Its English version went gold in January 2004.

== Reception ==
Reception

Aggregate scores
Aggregator	Score
GameRankings	82% 81% (Sentinels)
Metacritic	83/100

Review scores
Publication	Score
X-Play	4/5
Absolute Games	75%

According to Metacritic, Silent Storm received "generally positive reviews" from critics. The game experienced poor sales in the United States; GameSpot reported that "fewer than 20,000 copies" of the game sold during 2004.

While praised for its tactical depth, aesthetics and the quality of its game engine, the game has been criticized for its "silly", "over-the-top" story and voice acting, and for its inclusion of science fiction elements – specifically the Panzerkleins – and their effect upon game balance in the latter stages of the game. The game's "tired", "played-out" World War II setting, poor performance on contemporary hardware, lack of meaningful managerial features, and lack of multiplayer, were also noted.

=== Awards ===
GameSpot named Silent Storm the best computer game of January 2004, and the "Best Game No One Played" of the year overall. It also won the annual "Best Turn-Based Strategy Game 2004" prize from PC Gamer US, whose Mark H. Walker praised the game's "sweaty-palm firefights, clever leveling system, and its use of its World War II setting". Silent Storm received year-end award nominations for X-Play's "Best Original Game", Computer Gaming World's "Strategy Game of the Year (General)" and GameSpot's "Best Strategy Game".

== Legacy ==
Silent Storm was followed by an expansion pack entitled Silent Storm: Sentinels. The later Hammer & Sickle (2005) serves as a successor to the two games.
