= Sea Legends =

1995 video game

- Developer: Mir Dialogue
- Publishers: New Media Generation (Russia); Ocean of America (NA)
- Designer: George Osipov
- Platform: MS-DOS
- Release: EU: January 1, 1995; NA: May 31, 1996; Russia: September 16,1996
- Genres: Action-adventure, strategy
- Mode: Single-player

Sea Legends (Russian: Морские легенды) is an MS-DOS based game developed by the Russian company Mir Dialogue (later Nival), published by New Media Generation (in Russia) and Ocean of America (North America) and distributed by GTE Entertainment. First big project by the veteran of the Russian gaming industry Sergey Orlovskiy, it was among the pioneers of the voxel technology in video games, combining 3D environment with 2D sprites, which allowed for an open world sea basin and real-time naval battles.

Sea Legends was inspired by Sid Meier's Pirates, although it follows an original plot which also takes place in the Caribbean in the 17th century. The game features rather complex models of ship management and trading system.

In Sea Legends the player takes the role of Captain Richard Grey, a British sailor of noble heritage who has to use his knowledge to accomplish a series of different sea-based missions aboard his Frigate, the Hefestus. However, it is possible for the player to deviate from linear gameplay and become a pirate. As a pirate the player can freely explore the Caribbean Sea looting ships, attacking town ports and hunting for treasure.
