= Skyforge =

2015 video game

- Developers: Allods Team; Obsidian Entertainment
- Publisher: My.com
- Platforms: Microsoft Windows; Xbox One; PlayStation 4; Nintendo Switch
- Release: Microsoft Windows; July 16, 2015; PlayStation 4 April 11, 2017; Xbox One; November 29, 2017; Nintendo Switch; February 4, 2021
- Genre: Massively multiplayer online role-playing game
- Mode: Multiplayer

Skyforge is a discontinued free-to-play massively multiplayer online role-playing game developed by Allods Team in collaboration with Obsidian Entertainment, and published by My.com. Set on the planet Aelion, Skyforge fuses elements of Science fiction and fantasy in its visuals and storytelling, and sees players exploring the world as an immortal who must strive to become a god and defend the planet from alien invasion from other worlds. The project started development in 2010 and received an open release for Microsoft Windows in July 2015, with PlayStation 4 and Xbox One releases following in 2017. The latest major content update, "Ignition", was released on all platforms in September 2019. A Nintendo Switch version was released in February 2021.

On September 3, 2025, the Microsoft Windows versions were discontinued, while the console versions closed on October 29 in that same year.

== Gameplay ==
In Skyforge, players assume the role of an immortal with incredible celestial powers who must protect the planet Aelion from invaders who threaten the world and its population. Character progression within the game is not level based; instead of a traditional leveling format, Skyforge features a 'prestige' system, which allows a player to advance based on the sum total of their stats and progression. This allows players to develop and switch between 17 different classes at any time, rather than being locked into a class choice made earlier in the game. As a player gains more prestige, additional content, gear, and followers are unlocked. Once the player becomes a god, Skyforge includes an additional progression system which allows users to manage their followers to increase their character's overall power.

There are a lot of locations on Aelion to visit, as well as many missions to take on. The capital of Aelion serves as the game's hub, with three core locations. The Divine Observatory is where the player can take on missions and visit different locations through a hologram globe. The Divine Observatory allows players to travel to different locations around Aelion, and also participate in player versus player battles. Each location, including Dankit Island, Lanber Forest, and Isola Digs, has multiple objectives, enemies, and storylines. At the Research Center, the player can train, try out different classes, and change the appearance of their character. In the Park, players explore and occasionally hosts events, such as seasonal pumpkin lighting and gift opening events for Halloween and Christmas.

Players can team up with friends and random players online to take on missions and larger raids and instances.

== Story ==
In the universe of Skyforge, gods derive their powers from their followers. The planet of Aelion was once a free world protected by the Greater God named Aeli, who helped civilization flourish. When the story begins, Aeli has vanished, leaving behind a world of followers which is only protected by immortals (the player characters) and a few remaining lesser gods, leaving it under attack by hostile gods and invading alien forces from neighboring planets. The player starts in the capital of Aelion as an immortal, and after talking to Herida, a goddess and advisor to the immortals, discovers that they were brought back to life after a devastating attack by the Reapers of Death. After choosing a starting class and undergoing combat guides, training, tutorials, and character customization, the player can tackle combat missions around Aelion, fighting off invaders such as the ghastly Reapers of Death, the mechanical Mechanoids, the botanical Phytonides, the amphibious Oceanids, the serpentine Gorgonides, and the astral Demons.

The update New Horizons, released on April 9, 2019, introduced the planet Terra, new story content, and the Draconids, a new enemy race.

== Development ==
Allods Team, who previously developed the massively multiplayer online role-playing game Allods Online, started developing Skyforge for PC in 2010. It was confirmed that My.com would publish the game. In May 2013, it was announced that Obsidian Entertainment, known for their work on western role-playing video games such as Star Wars Knights of the Old Republic II: The Sith Lords, Neverwinter Nights 2, and Fallout: New Vegas, would be collaborating with Allods Team on the development of Skyforge. The game entered closed beta in 2015, and received an open public release for Microsoft Windows on 16 July 2015. On April 11, 2017, Skyforge was released for PlayStation 4. It was also released for Xbox One on November 29, 2017, and was released for Nintendo Switch on February 4, 2021.

=== Business model ===
Skyforge is free-to-play but allows players to pay for certain in-game content, including an optional premium status. A store also allows players to purchase certain items, including cosmetics and equipment that gives small stat boosts.

== Reception ==
Skyforge received "mixed or average" reviews according to review aggregator Metacritic. Rock, Paper, Shotgun reviewer Richard Cobbett said the game was "one of the more pleasant F2P MMOs I've played of late", and praised the differences between Skyforge and competitors, including its hub world, the scattered quests in open areas, and the "genuine sense of trying to be a good game first and a profitable one second".

Reception

Aggregate score
Aggregator	Score
Metacritic	52/100

Review score
Publication	Score
Nintendo Life	3/10

=== Awards ===
- 'MMORPG of the Year' from MMOs.com's 2015 Game of the Year Awards
- 'Best of Show' from TenTonHammer's Best of E3 2014 Awards

=== Nominated ===
- 'Best PC Game' from Destructoid's Best of E3 2014 Awards
