= MorphX (video game) =

2008 video game

- Developer(s): Targem Games
- Publisher(s): Buka Entertainment; 505 Games
- Platform(s): Windows, Xbox 360
- Release: RUS: October 23, 2008 (PC); NA: September 28, 2010; EU: September 24, 2010
- Genre(s): Action-adventure, third-person shooter
- Mode(s): Single-player

MorphX (known in Russia as Simbiont (Russian: Симбионт)), also known as The Swarm (working title), is a 2008 third-person shooter video game developed by Targem Games and published by Buka Entertainment in Russia and 505 Games in the West. A light-gun shooter arcade game adaptation was released in 2013 by Global VR.

== Gameplay ==
MorphX is a science-fiction action-adventure video game played from a third-person perspective. The player can gain abnormal abilities by killing different aliens, and absorbing their genetic material to acquire their specific traits.

== Synopsis ==
In 2008, Earth was invaded by the alien swarm. Within the year, they had complete control of earth and had wiped out most of mankind. During 2009, the Swarm directed its effort to locate and wipe out the few remaining pockets of resistance. The year is now 2011, and mankind is still fighting to survive. Meanwhile, sightings of strange humanoid creatures are reported, their purpose unknown. Some believe they are the products of experiments the swarm has done on humans, while some believe it's the first of a new generation of swarm adapted to life on Earth.

In 2012, one of mankind's last bastions dubbed "The Laboratory", resides beneath the ruins of Moscow. There the survivors work tirelessly to stop this new threat.

== Development ==
Lead developer "JSinx" told IGN that the development team was inspired to set the game in their home city of Moscow as there were many tales about the end of the world in film, literature and videogames, but no famous story set in Moscow.

== Reception ==
MorphX received "generally unfavourable" reviews according to review aggregator Metacritic.

GameSpot's 4/10 review stated that "there are enough innovative ideas here with the alien metamorphosis mechanics that could have made this an inventive, captivating shooter", but lamented "design screwups [that] are so blatant that they get in the way of enjoying the weird stuff with alien genes and mutant powers".
