= Targem Games =

Russian video game developer

- Type: Private
- Industry: Video games
- Founded: 2002
- Headquarters: Yekaterinburg, Russia
- Products: Hard Truck Apocalypse; Armageddon Riders; GearGrinder; MorphX
- Website: www.targem.ru/en/

Targem Games is a Russian video game developer based in Yekaterinburg, geographically in Ural. Established in 2002, the company has created several PC and console games of various genres. The company received several awards at the Russian Game Developer's Conference, including "Best Debut", "Best Game Design" and "Most innovative project".

== History ==
- 2002 – The company is founded. The first contract with Buka for the creation of Battle Mages is signed.
- 2003 – Battle Mages, an original RTS/RPG hybrid, is the first game of the company released in Russia. Later the game is localized into several languages including Chinese. The work on add-on and a new big project starts.
- 2004 – Battle Mages is released in US, Europe and China. The add-on to the Battle Mages named Sign of darkness is released in Russia.
- 2005 – Hard Truck Apocalypse is released in Russia under the title Ex Machina and is a success there. Next year the game hits the stores of US.
- 2006 – Hard Truck Apocalypse: Rise of Clans is released.
- 2007 – Ex Machina: Arcade and Day Watch are released in Russia.
- 2008 – The company acquires status of certified Xbox 360 and PlayStation 3 developers. The Swarm and GearGrinder are released in Russia.
- 2009 – The company is presented at the Game connection Europe.
  - GearGrinder is released world-wide.
  - Clutch is released world-wide. It is a first game of the company that can be bought via Steam.
- 2011 – Targem Games' first downloadable PlayStation 3 game Armageddon Riders was released on 2 June on PSN. Targem Games not only developed but also self-published it.
  - In May a chess game entitled Battle vs. Chess developed by Targem Games was released in Europe.
- 2012 – Targem Games releases its second downloadable game for PlayStation 3 titled Planets Under Attack in November. The game is also released on Steam and on XBLA with the help of Topware.

== Titles ==
Game name	Release year	Genre
Battle Mages	2003	RTS/RPG
Battle Mages: Sign of Darkness	2004	RTS/RPG
Hard Truck Apocalypse	2005	Truck simulator/Car combat/RPG
Hard Truck Apocalypse: Rise of Clans	2006	Truck simulator/Car combat/RPG
Ex Machina: Arcade	2007	Car combat
Day Watch	2007	Turn based tactics
Sledgehammer/GearGrinder	2008	Racing/Car combat
MorphX	2008	TPS/Slasher
Clutch	2009	Racing/Car combat
Insane 2	2011	Off-road Racing
Armageddon Riders	2011	Racing/Car combat
Battle vs. Chess	2011	Chess
Planets Under Attack	2012	RTS
Star Conflict	2012	MMO/Space action
Blazerush	2014	Racing/Car combat
Etherlords	2014	Card battle
Crossout	2015	Racing/Car combat
Star Conflict Heroes	2017	Sci-fi RPG

Star Conflict was developed by Star Gem Inc., a branch of Targem Games.
