= Silent Storm engine =

Video game engine

Nival Interactive developed a proprietary game engine for its turn-based tactics video game Silent Storm. The engine was reused for Silent Storm: Sentinels, Night Watch, Hammer & Sickle and Day Watch. A modified version of this engine was used for Heroes of Might and Magic V. Akella used the engine for Jagged Alliance 3 in 2007 before that version of the game was cancelled in 2010.

== Features ==
Silent Storm presents the player with a large array of tactical options, including two sets of equipped weapons, numerous stances, and several different firing modes. Terrain elevation is also completely fluid, with smooth ramps, sloping embankments, flights of stairs and ladders (not pictured).

The engine features an advanced physics model – nearly all structures are destructible, and ragdoll physics is employed for bodies with variation according to the precise velocity and impact of projectiles. Three-dimensional mapping allows for obstruction calculations and cover effects from any direction. Bullets ricochet, and their stopping power depends on the strength of the weapon. Also modeled are materials' effectiveness at stopping ordnance and visibility based on lighting conditions. All these effects are, however, exaggerated for a more cinematic experience (e.g., a hail of non-fatal bullets only makes the target shake, but a single fatal bullet can send the target flying), which has been praised by some reviewers as a feature. Reviewer Greg Kasavin commented that "pray and spray" tactics are quite viable, as the game uses silhouettes to mark enemies' estimated positions when they happen to lie out of eyesight but within earshot.

Mechanics common to role-playing video games are also featured, such as the ability for characters to be customized over time. The player's units gain experience points over time for completing actions, which can later be spent on purchasing new skills and abilities. The engine also uses an action point system, whereby players can select from various actions, such as firing modes, stances and forms of movement. A sequel, Silent Storm: Sentinels, introduced weapon degradation to the series.

== Reception ==
The engine has been praised for its ability – commonly found in RTS – to allow users to select and issue orders to multiple units at once, and for allowing players to select which items to pick up from a list. Also praised were the quality of its graphics and weapon and environmental sounds, though these sentiments were tempered as the engine began to age. Reviewers also appreciated the destructibility of the environment, role-playing elements and "squad-based tactical combat".

Criticisms include the engine not taking into account the relative position of objects in 3-dimensional space when making selections using the mouse. For instance, when selecting and issuing actions to a group of soldiers, the selection may include soldiers that occupy different elevations, making the orders nonsensical. The engine has also been criticized for slow performance, even on top-end (at the time) computers. Finally, the engine has been criticized for the length of time required for the artificial intelligence to complete its turns, a lack of any multiplayer support and the uncooperativeness of its camera controls.
