= Astrum Online Entertainment =

- Company type: Holding
- Website type: Web portal
- Available in: Russian
- Founded: 2007
- Headquarters: Moscow, Russia
- Key people: Igor Matsanuyk (president), Boris Gertsovskiy (Vice President), Alisa Chumachenko (vice president of marketing and advertisement), Vsevolod Leonov (vice president of business development), Anatoly Ropotov (executive vice president of products)
- Industry: Development, publishing, localization and operating MMO games
- Products: Developed Games: Allods Online, Legend: Legacy of the Dragons, Time Zero, Three Kingdoms, Sphere, Heroes: Resurrection, Territory, Cosmics: Galactic Wars, BloodyWorld, Love City, Desolation: Riders of Merion, Sphere: Rebirth, Destiny, Keepers of the Power, Faor, Sphere 2: Arena, Funny War, Dom 3, Evil Tale; Localized and published games: Perfect World, Granado Espada, Tales of Pirates, The Lord of the Rings Online, ParaPa: City of Dance, Monato. World of Dreams, Rapplez
- Website: astrumonline.ru/eng
- Launched: 2007
- Current status: active

Astrum Online Entertainment is a Russian holding company which operates in the online entertainment market of Eastern Europe. Founded in the beginning of December 2007, it incorporated four companies, which specialize in development, publishing and operating online games: Nival Online, IT Territory, Time Zero, and Nikita Online. In summer 2008 the fifth company, the developer of online games called "DJ Games", joined in.

According to the experts, the 2008 revenues of Astrum Online were estimated at US$50 million.

Astrum Online currently operates more than 30 MMO games, including such popular titles as "Legend: Legacy of the Dragons", "Sphere", "Territory", "Three Kingdoms", and "Perfect World".

== History ==
Astrum Online was founded in December 2007. Joint forces of the companies let to launch several major gaming projects in Russia and abroad and to support dynamic domestic growth of existing titles in 2008.

The end of 2008 and the very beginning of 2009 were marked with official launches of MMO game "Legend: Legacy of the Dragons" in Germany and Turkey by Astrum GmbH (Astrum's representative office in Europe) and in China in partnership with Snail Game. Previously MMORPG TimeZero was launched in Germany.

== Key people ==
- Igor Matsanyuk, President
- Boris Gertsovskiy, Vice President
- Alisa Chumachenko, Vice President of Marketing and Advertising
- Vsevolod Leonov, Vice President of Business Development
- Anatoly Ropotov, EVP of Products
- Robert Johnsson, Chief Executive Officer Astrum Online Europe GmbH

== Subsidiaries ==
- Time Zero
- Nikita Online
- Nival Online
- DJ Games

== Game titles (as of March 2009) ==
- Allods Online
- Legend: Legacy of the Dragons
- Perfect World
- Slapshot

=== Legend: Legacy of the Dragons ===
Legend: Legacy of the Dragons
- Developer: IT Territory
- Publisher: My.com
- Platform: Browser based
- Release: 2006
- Genres: RPG, MMORPG, Adventure
- Mode: Multiplayer

Legend: Legacy of the Dragons is a fantasy MMORPG created by the Russian developer IT Territory in 2006 and published by My.com. The English version of the game was released on November 6, 2007. In 2008 the game was localized for the German market by Mail.ru Games GmbH (formerly known as Astrum Online Entertainment), followed by Turkish, Polish, Spanish, French and Italian. In 2014 the game ceased to be published by Mail.ru Games GmbH in these languages and was transferred to My.com.

As of 2017 the audience exceeded 8 million players worldwide. In Russia the game has won the prize for the best internet presence ("Premia Runeta") several times and has a cult status with the Russian gaming community.

==== Finance ====
The online browser game Legend: Legacy of the Dragons is playable free of charge and without any further software. The game does not require monthly fees. The revenue generated with this so-called "free-to-play" business model mostly result from shops within the game. These offer a vast variety of items and equipment to the player such as armour and weaponry, potions, scrolls and so on. The player can pay for these items with gold, the in-game currency, which is awarded to each player in small amounts for fights with monsters or the successful completion of quests. Additionally the players can use real money in order to by the diamond game currency which in turn may be exchanged in banks within the game for gold. The success of this business model is apparent in the "exceptionally high ARPU (average revenue per user), which exceeds market's average by far".

==== Story ====
Legend: Legacy of the Dragons is set in the fantasy realm of Faeo in which Humans and Magmars are locked in an eternal battle for supremacy. The races live on two different continents, Ogriy and Khair, in which most of the game play takes place. Apart from these continents there are also the island of Fay-Go and an Underwater World in the Balluar Ocean which separates the continents from one another. In the world of Legend: Legacy of the Dragons there are diverse landscapes such as moors, forests, plateaus and mountains, as well as small towns and cities. In addition there are several instances and battle fields in caves, grottoes and castles. The game's graphics are like paintings, grim at times and have been created "with an eye for detail".

The chronicles cover the whole history of the fantasy realm of Faeo from its creation up to the "epoch of the dragons", in which time the game is set in. They tell of an everlasting battle for the necessary equilibrium of good and evil on the one hand, and that of order and uncontrollable chaos on the other. The ruler over the whole of Faeo is the goddess Sheara, mistress of the dragons and the two most powerful of these lizards - Striagorn and Erifarius - serve her a patrons of either race, the Humans and the Magmars. The dragons are locked in their struggle for supremacy which is overshadowed by the threat of chaos in the form of the Chaos Army. The only chance to save the world of Faeo is for the races to unite, put their quarrels aside and face the formidable foe side by side.

== Internet portals (as of March 2009) ==
- Games.mail.ru
- Woh.ru
- Astrumo.de

== Payment system ==
- Terrabank
- Webmoney
