= E3 2011 =

17th annual Electronic Entertainment Expo

Electronic Entertainment Expo 2011
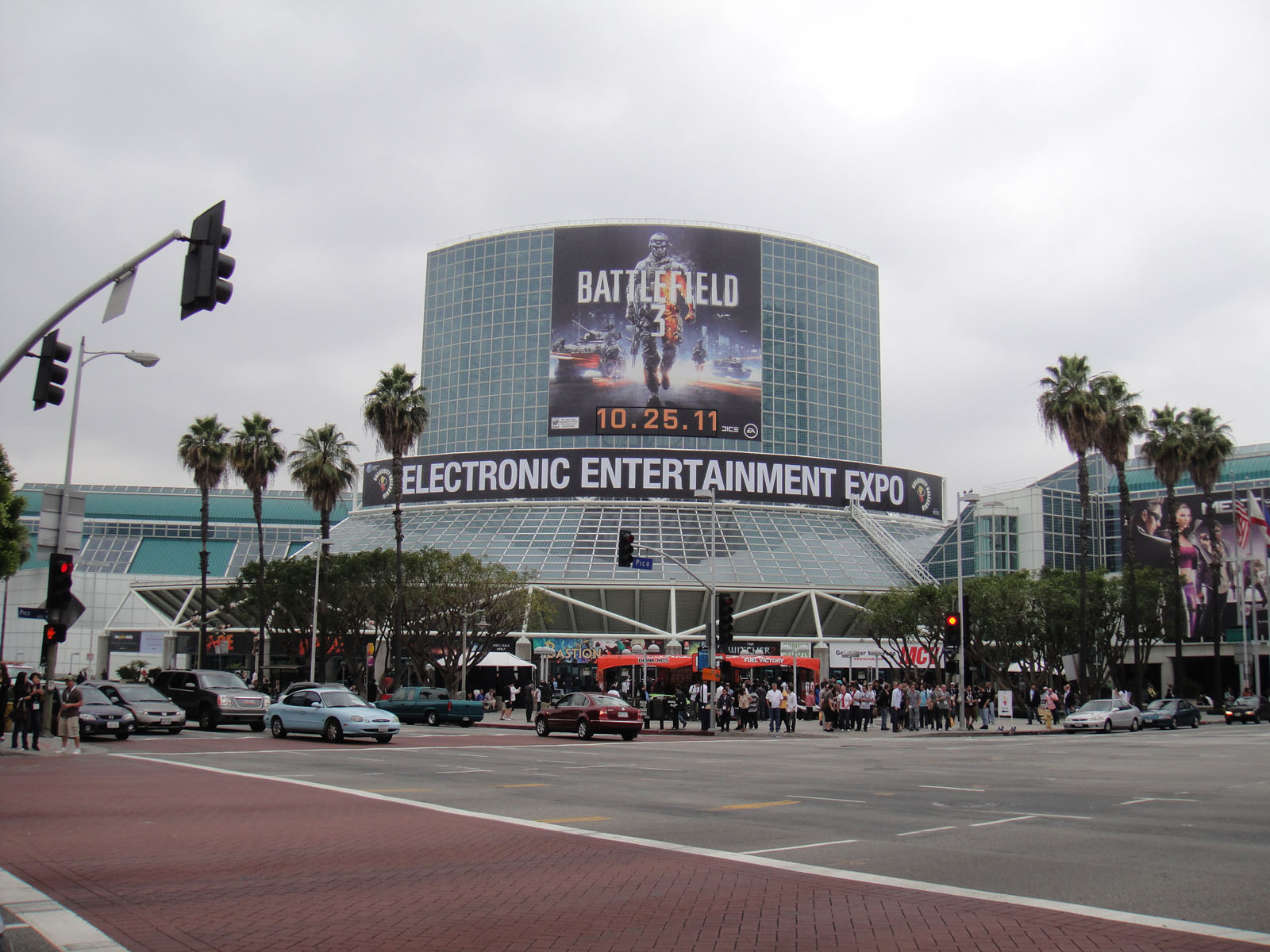
- The Los Angeles Convention Center during E3 2011, with Battlefield 3 occupying entrance advertising
- Genre: Multi-genre
- Begins: June 7, 2011
- Ends: June 9, 2011
- Venue: Los Angeles Convention Center
- Locations: Los Angeles, California
- Country: United States
- Previous event: E3 2010
- Next event: E3 2012
- Attendance: 46,800
- Organizer: Entertainment Software Association
- Filing status: Non-profit

The Electronic Entertainment Expo 2011 (E3 2011) was the 17th E3 held. The event took place at the Los Angeles Convention Center in Los Angeles, California. It began on June 7, 2011, and ended on June 9, 2011, with 46,800 total attendees. E3 2011 was broadcast on the G4 channel.

The main highlights of the 2011 show included a demonstration of Sony's next-generation handheld game console, the PlayStation Vita; the official introduction of Nintendo's Wii U home console; and the unveiling of Microsoft's Halo 4.

On June 8, Sega held the Sonic Boom 2011 concert at Club Nokia which featured performances from the rock band Crush 40 and Alex Makhlouf of Cash Cash.

== Press conferences ==
As in previous years, the conference was dominated by announcements from the three main console manufacturers: Microsoft, Sony and Nintendo. Tech analysts considered the unveiling of Nintendo's Wii U and its then-unnamed tablet controller to be E3's biggest event, with Sony's PlayStation Vita handheld console also generating considerable press attention. The Wii U system was credited by several media outlets as a "next-generation" console. Microsoft did not announce any major hardware releases, but did showcase a number of games for its Kinect controller-free gaming system.

=== Konami ===
Konami held its own pre-E3 event on June 2 to showcase its upcoming games. The showcase featured live events in a number of cities, including Los Angeles, San Francisco, Toronto, São Paulo, and Mexico City.

=== Microsoft ===
Microsoft's press conference took place on June 6 at 9:00am. It focused on the Xbox 360; it was titled the "Xbox 360 E311 Media Briefing" event. Call of Duty: Modern Warfare 3 was shown during Microsoft's press conference.

=== Electronic Arts ===
Electronic Arts took the stage on June 6 at 12:30pm.

=== Ubisoft ===
Ubisoft held a press conference on June 6 at 2:30pm.

=== Sony ===
Sony's press conference took place on June 6 at 5:00pm. However, the conference was delayed for 16 minutes. The press conference focused on the company's upcoming device, PlayStation Vita, and the PlayStation 3.

=== Nintendo ===
Nintendo's press conference took place on June 7 at 9:00am at the Nokia Theatre. Nintendo unveiled the successor to its Wii console, the Wii U, which was released in 2012. A prototype of the console was playable to attendees of the event.

== List of featured games ==
This is a list of notable titles that appeared at E3 2011.

2K Games: BioShock Infinite (PC, PS3, Xbox 360); Duke Nukem Forever (PC, PS3, Xbox 360); The Darkness II (PC, PS3, Xbox 360); XCOM (PC, Xbox 360); Activision: Call of Duty: Modern Warfare 3 (PC, PS3, Xbox 360); Prototype 2 (PC, PS3, Xbox 360); Skylanders: Spyro's Adventure (PC, PS3, Wii, Xbox 360); Spider-Man: Edge of Time (PS3, Wii, Xbox 360); X-Men: Destiny (PS3, Xbox 360); Atlus: Catherine (PS3, Xbox 360); Bethesda: Prey 2 (PC, PS3, Xbox 360); Rage (PC, PS3, Xbox 360); The Elder Scrolls V: Skyrim (PC, PS3, Xbox 360); Capcom: Asura's Wrath (PS3, Xbox 360); DmC: Devil May Cry (PS3, Xbox 360); Megaman Legends 3 (3DS); Resident Evil: Operation Raccoon City (PC, PS3, Xbox 360); Resident Evil: Revelations (3DS); Resident Evil: The Mercenaries 3D (3DS); Street Fighter X Tekken (PS3, Xbox 360, Vita); Crytek: Ryse: Son of Rome (Xbox 360); Deep Silver: Dead Island (PC, PS3, Xbox 360); Risen 2: Dark Waters (PC, PS3, Xbox 360); Electronic Arts: Battlefield 3 (PC, PS3, Xbox 360); FIFA 12 (3DS, PC, PS3, PSP, Wii, Xbox 360); Fuse (PS3, Xbox 360); Kingdoms of Amalur: Reckoning (PC, PS3, Xbox 360); Madden NFL 12 (3DS, PC, PS3, PSP, Wii, Xbox 360); Mass Effect 3 (PC, PS3, Xbox 360); Need for Speed: The Run (3DS, PC, PS3, Wii, Xbox 360); Shadows of the Damned (PS3, Xbox 360); SSX (PS3, Xbox 360); Star Wars: The Old Republic (PC); The Sims 3: Pets (PC, PS3, Xbox 360, Wii, DS, 3DS); The Sims Social (Navigator); Focus Home Interactive: Testament Of Sherlock Holmes (PC, PS3, Xbox 360); Konami: Metal Gear Solid HD Collection (PS3, Xbox 360); Metal Gear Solid 3: Snake Eater 3D (3DS); Silent Hill: Book of Memories (Vita); Silent Hill: Downpour (PS3, Xbox 360); Silent Hill Collection (PS3, Xbox 360); Zone of the Enders HD Collection (PS3, Xbox 360)	Lionhead Studios: Fable: The Journey (Xbox 360); LucasArts: Kinect Star Wars (Xbox 360); Microsoft: Forza Motorsport 4 (Xbox 360); Gears of War 3 (Xbox 360); Halo: Combat Evolved Anniversary (Xbox 360); Halo 4 (Xbox 360); Kinect Disneyland Adventures (Xbox 360); Kinect Sports: Season Two (Xbox 360); Dance Central 2 (Xbox 360); Namco Bandai: Ace Combat 3D (3DS); Ace Combat: Assault Horizon (PS3, Xbox 360); Dark Souls (PS3, Xbox 360); Inversion (PS3, Xbox 360); Ridge Racer Unbounded (3DS, PC, PS3, Xbox 360); Soulcalibur V (PS3, Xbox 360); Tales of Graces F (PS3); Tales of the Abyss (3DS); Tekken (Wii U); Natsume Inc.: Rune Factory: Tides of Destiny (PS3, Wii); Nintendo: Animal Crossing 3DS (3DS); Dragon Quest Monsters: Joker 2 (DS); Fortune Street (Wii); Kid Icarus: Uprising (3DS); Kirby Wii (Wii); Luigi's Mansion 2 (3DS); Mario Kart 7 (3DS); Mario Party 9 (Wii); Paper Mario (3DS); Star Fox 64 3D (3DS); Super Mario 3D Land (3DS); The Legend of Zelda: Ocarina of Time 3D (3DS); The Legend of Zelda: Skyward Sword (Wii); Wii U games (Wii U); Nival: Prime World (PC); Sega: Aliens: Colonial Marines (PC, PS3, Wii U, Xbox 360); Anarchy Reigns (PS3, Xbox 360); Binary Domain (PS3, Xbox 360); Captain America: Super Soldier (PC, PS3, Wii, Xbox 360); Renegade Ops (PC, PS3, Xbox 360); Rise of Nightmares (Xbox 360); Shinobi (3DS); Sonic Generations (PS3, Xbox 360, 3DS)	Sony: God of War: Origins Collection (PS3); The Ico & Shadow of the Colossus Collection (PS3); Journey (PS3); Ratchet & Clank: All 4 One (PS3); Resistance 3 (PS3); Sly Cooper: Thieves in Time (PS3); Starhawk (PS3); Twisted Metal (PS3); Uncharted: Golden Abyss (PS Vita); Uncharted 3: Drake's Deception (PS3); PlayStation Vita games (Vita); Square Enix: Deus Ex: Human Revolution (PC, PS3, Xbox 360); Dungeon Siege III (PC, PS3, Xbox 360); Final Fantasy XIII-2 (PS3, Xbox 360); Hitman: Absolution (PC, PS3, Xbox 360); Tomb Raider (PC, PS3, Xbox 360); THQ: Darksiders II (PS3, Wii U, Xbox 360); Devil's Third (Xbox 360, PS3); Saints Row: The Third (Xbox 360, PS3, PC); WWE '12 (PS3, Xbox 360, Wii); UFC Undisputed 3 (PS3, Xbox 360); Tecmo Koei: Dynasty Warriors (Vita); Ninja Gaiden III (PS3, Wii U, Xbox 360); Traveller's Tales: Lego City Undercover (3DS, Wii U); Ubisoft: The Adventures of Tintin: Secret of the Unicorn (PC, PS3, Xbox 360); Assassin's Creed: Revelations (PC, PS3, Xbox 360, Wii U); Brothers in Arms: Furious 4 (PC, PS3, Xbox 360); Call of Juarez: The Cartel (PC, PS3, Xbox 360); Driver: Renegade (3DS); Driver: San Francisco (PC, PS3, Xbox 360); Far Cry 3 (PC, PS3, Xbox 360); Just Dance 3 (PS3, Xbox 360, Wii); Rayman Origins (PS3, Wii, Xbox 360); Rocksmith (PC, PS3, Xbox 360); Tom Clancy's Ghost Recon Online (PC, Wii U); Tom Clancy's Ghost Recon: Future Soldier (DS, PC, PS3, Xbox 360); TrackMania 2 (PC); Your Shape: Fitness Evolved 2012 (Xbox 360); ZombiU (Wii U); Warner Bros.: Bastion (PC, Xbox 360); Batman: Arkham City (PC, PS3, Wii U, Xbox 360); The Lord of the Rings: War in the North (PC, PS3, Xbox 360); Wargaming: World of Tanks (PC)

== List of notable exhibitors ==
This is a list of major video game exhibitors who made appearances at E3 2011.

- 2K Games
- Activision
- Atari
- Atlus
- Bethesda
- Capcom
- Codemasters
- Crytek
- Disney
- EA
- Epic Games
- Focus Home Interactive
- Konami
- LucasArts
- Majesco
- Microsoft
- Namco Bandai
- Natsume Inc.
- Nintendo
- Nival
- Paradox
- Sega
- Sony
- Square Enix
- Tecmo Koei
- THQ
- Ubisoft
- Warner Bros.
- Wargaming
