= Rise of Nightmares =

2011 video game

- North American cover art
- Developer: Sega
- Publisher: Sega
- Directors: Ryuta Ueda; Masayuki Kawabata
- Producer: Satoshi Ito
- Artist: Kazuo Fukasawa
- Composer: Ron Fish
- Platform: Xbox 360
- Release: NA: September 6, 2011; JP: September 8, 2011; EU: September 9, 2011; AU: September 14, 2011
- Genre: Survival horror
- Mode: Single-player

Rise of Nightmares, known in Japan as Rise of Nightmare (ライズ オブ ナイトメア, Raizu obu Naitomea), is a survival horror video game developed and published by Sega for the Xbox 360. The game was revealed at the 2010 Tokyo Game Show, and is designed specifically for Kinect. It was the first M-rated game to be released for the Kinect.

== Plot ==
The game begins with a couple of prisoners attempting to escape from the dungeon they are imprisoned in. After breaking out of their cell, they find a locked door. One of the prisoners pulls a nearby lever, which both unlocks the door and releases creatures that were locked in the dungeon. They made it to the hall and approached a door. However, a monstrous masked figure suddenly appears, causing the prisoners to panic and run toward the door. They find it to be locked before the wall closes in and kills them both.

While on vacation in Romania, Josh and his wife Kate are on a train with several other tourists. During the train ride, Kate is about to tell Josh something when she discovers he was hiding a bottle of alcohol. Angry, she walks out and heads to the dining car. Josh comes across a Romanian man who tells him that his wife left a letter for him, and reads it. It says that Kate is sorry for getting angry at Josh, that she wasn't herself lately and asks Josh to meet her at the dining cart. Feeling guilty, Josh heads to the dining car to apologize. On his way, he encounters many travelers, such as Gregor, an elderly man; Lin, a student; Sacha and Tasha, two ballerinas; four teenagers - Monica, Max, Aaron and Katja - heading to a rave; Jane, an English psychiatrist; two Romanian generals; a Romanian ticket collector; a German businessman; and Yeli, a fortune-teller who gives Josh a grim prediction. He then proceeds further, only to find one of the cars is covered in blood. Bursting forth, he finds his wife being carried by a large man, with an odd-looking mechanism on his face. One of the generals tries to stop the man, but is ripped in half. Josh and Yeli follow, catching a glimpse of a strange man laughing maniacally. Suddenly, the train derails, and Josh is knocked unconscious.

Josh awakens to find the train has slid into a river. He tries to save the ticket collector from drowning, but he fails. The general calls him to shore, and Josh runs to a cave where the other survivors are hiding. The businessman walks away from the cave into the forest, where he is killed by something off-screen. Panicking, the survivors run deeper into the cave to escape, until they fall out the other side into a swamp. The other general is then pulled under and killed. After escaping the swamp and walking through the forest, they come upon a cemetery where they meet up with another group of survivors; Aaron, Sacha and Tasha. Lin wanders off into a nearby cellar, and is suddenly heard screaming. Josh runs to help and finds her panicking, saying she saw a corpse move. Josh investigates and the corpse, along with several others, reanimate and attack them both. The girl runs away, and Josh fends them off before pursuing her. Josh exits the cellar and finds that all the survivors have fled due to the zombies. As Josh makes his way through the cemetery, he witnesses Monica being decapitated by Ernst and thrown at a wall. Ernst then subdues Josh, who loses consciousness again.

Josh awakens to find that he has been tied to a chair by Viktor, the mad scientist responsible for the zombies. Max is tied up as well, but is soon killed by Viktor. He is about to kill Josh when he gets a phone call and exits urgently, leaving a zombie nurse to finish the job. Fortunately, Josh is rescued and freed by the Romanian who told Josh of Kate's letter, and they attempt to find their way out. The two make their way through a hall when the survivor inspects a fresh bloodstain, only to end up bisected by a trap. Josh fights his way through a horde of zombies and encounters Jane, but she is immediately kidnapped by Ernst. He later comes across a ringing phone. Josh answers and hears Kate begging him to help, followed by a woman's voice telling him that he will never find her, and a projector shows footage of a mysterious woman next to Kate. He advances to a cave to find that the two Russian ballerinas are now zombies, and the strange woman from before traps him in with the zombie twins. After he kills them, he wanders outside to a courtyard.

In the courtyard, he hears someone asking him to help him out of the shed. The man, Fido, claims to have been Viktor's employee once, and to know how to save Kate. When freed by Josh, Josh is surprised to find that his head has been sewn to the body of a small lapdog. Fido tells Josh that he will only help him if he helps return him to his human state. After being restored to his human body, he gives Josh the key to the tall tower, and tells him there's a surprise at the top. Josh then wanders to the top of the tower to find the raver couple, now resembling marionettes. He kills them, and then is transported to a cave, where he picks up a mystical weapon, Azoth, that attaches to his left hand.

Josh eventually finds Kate, but she is strapped to a table with Viktor and Ernst next to her. Viktor tells Ernst to kill Josh, but Josh defeats him. Near death, Ernst decides to let Josh and Kate escape. In a fit of rage, Viktor brutally murders Ernst. Josh and Kate run into a forest, but Kate is entranced by a sudden music that starts playing, and she wanders into a sacrificial site. Viktor is there, but in the body of a woman. He opens up a portal, but Josh destroys the towers that created it, and Viktor is burned to death. However, before he can reach Kate, Marchosias, or Fido in his human form, knocks Josh unconscious. Josh wakes up to find that he is strapped to a vertical table, with the bodies of Viktor and Ernst present too. Marchosias reveals that he was fascinated by Viktor, and will use Josh in order to reincarnate him. Out of Viktor's corpse he pulls out an eel-like creature, and inserts it into Josh's mouth.

Josh then reawakens to find himself in a prison cell, in the body of Ernst. He sees Kate walking along with Viktor, who is now in the body of Josh. Kate now believes that Viktor is Josh, and that Josh is Ernst. The two leave Josh in the body of Ernst in his cell. Soon, Josh hears Aaron and Katja, who have escaped from their cell, the event that happens before the start of the game. They open all the cell doors, and Josh tries to follow them, but, believing that he is Ernst, they flee and are killed.

Josh runs after Kate, and sees her walking off with Viktor in Josh's body. He follows, and meets Marchosias again. He then reveals an altered Jane, and tells her to kill Josh. Josh overpowers her, and she begins to have a mental breakdown. As she starts to burn up, she jumps onto Marchosias, and they both burn to death together. Josh staggers out into the forest, and collapses.

He wakes up to see Yeli dancing in front of him, saying that before Josh can kill Viktor and claim back his body, he must enter the dream realm to learn why everything happened. She stabs him with a dagger that sends him back to the train, but in his imagination. Josh can also hear what the other passengers were thinking at the time, before all of them turn into a blood-like gas. Lin is thinking about how her parents will hate her once they find out that she dropped out of school; the two ballerinas are thinking that without the other, they could be stars; Aaron thinks about how he doesn't like 'love and peace'; Monica is thinking about how she loves Europe and how lovely Max is; Max is thinking about how to use Monica to smuggle drugs into America; Katja is lamenting about how Monica is being used as Max's puppet; Jane is thinking about her next project, and how half-dead people can be used, before snapping herself out of it and thinking that she might need counselling; A Romanian general is thinking about how he lost his friends in war because his gun jammed, and the other is thinking about marrying the woman he loves and setting up his own business; the ticket collector is strangely thinking about the train derailing; and the German businessman wants to embezzle his company's funds. Lastly, he sees Kate, who is thinking about the fact that she is pregnant. Josh, who didn't previously know this, is shocked. Viktor then appears by her side, declaring that she is the same as his wife Mary. Kate disappears, Viktor sees Josh, and he runs away.

Next, Josh is led to Viktor's memories with Mary, who is revealed to be the strange woman from before. Mary and Viktor had a child and were happy together, but Viktor later experimented on the newborn to make it genetically perfect. This led to its eventual death. After being confronted on this by Mary, he strangled her to death. Filled with remorse, he vowed to learn how to resurrect the dead to bring Mary back. He then sees Viktor dressed in Mary's clothes. He laughs at Josh, telling him that his baby is gone. Josh finds Yeli's dagger, and stabs Viktor in the heart with it.

Josh wakes up to see that in real life, he has stabbed Yeli. Not only that, but he is in his own body, and not Ernst's. Josh coughs up Viktor's eel, and it dies. Yeli then tells Josh that Kate is at the ritual site, and she charges his Azoth. She then dies next to the body of Ernst, revealed to be her husband. Josh proceeds to find Kate, and he is teleported to a staircase where he can hear Viktor and Mary arguing. Mary is shouting that Viktor killed their baby. Josh then arrives in Mary's dream world, a mystical land of floating islands. Josh finds Mary tending to his unborn baby. Mary demands that he leave, but Josh refuses, and they fight. She turns into a massive two-headed flying demon, with a heart-like body. Josh eventually kills her with the Azoth. Josh takes back his baby, and the dream ends.

In a post-credits scene, Josh and a pregnant Kate are leaving Romania on a train. As Josh leaves, he bumps into a man, his face and body badly burned and bandaged. The man sits down near Kate, and opens his suitcase to reveal three small phials with the parasites in them. The man laughs, before the screen cuts to black.

== Development ==
A teaser trailer was shown at the 2010 Tokyo Game Show upon the game's announcement. The game was also in attendance for E3 2011.

== Reception ==
Reception

Aggregate score
Aggregator	Score
Metacritic	54/100

Review scores
Publication	Score
1Up.com	C−
Edge	4/10
Eurogamer	5/10
Famitsu	29/40
Game Informer	5/10
GamePro	2/5
GameSpot	5.5/10
IGN	4/10
Joystiq	3.5/5
Official Xbox Magazine (US)	6/10
411Mania	2.5/10
Digital Spy	3/5

Rise of Nightmares received "mixed" reviews according to the review aggregation website Metacritic. GameSpot praised the visual atmosphere and variety of weapons, but claimed that the motion controls of the game are unnatural and awkward. Joystiq praised the potential of the motion controls, but stated that the story of the game "is hackneyed at best and nonsensical at worst." In Japan, Famitsu gave it a score of one eight and three sevens for a total of 29 out of 40.

=== Sales ===
As of October 31, 2011, Rise of Nightmares sold 200,000 units worldwide.

== Film adaptation ==
Sega has formed the production company Stories International and is teaming up with Evan Cholfin for film and television projects based on their games with Rise of Nightmares as a live action project.
