= 9 Monkeys of Shaolin =

2020 video game

- Promotional art
- Developer: Sobaka Studio
- Publishers: Buka Entertainment; Ravenscourt
- Producer: Aleksandr Kuthekov
- Designer: Stepan Shabanov
- Artist: Mikhail Bushuev
- Composer: Nadezda Gourskaya
- Engine: Unreal Engine 4
- Platforms: Linux; macOS; Nintendo Switch; PlayStation 4; Windows; Xbox One
- Release: 16 October 2020
- Genre: Beat 'em up
- Modes: Single-player, multiplayer

9 Monkeys of Shaolin is a beat 'em up video game developed by Russian developer Sobaka Studio and published by Buka Entertainment and Ravenscourt. The game was released on 16 October 2020 for Nintendo Switch, PlayStation 4, Xbox One; and Linux, macOS, and Microsoft Windows via Steam.

The story recreates the atmosphere of the kung fu films of the 1970s. In 9 Monkeys of Shaolin, a fisherman goes to become one of the masters of Shaolin. On this way he passes life trials, meets new people with their unique personalities, and learns about revenge and death. Some of the people he met become his friends, and some betray him. But despite all of the difficulties on the difficult path, he has chosen to strive to leave his mark on history by saving his homeland and the whole world from evil.

Although the game world tries to adhere to real historical events, places, weapons and characters as much as possible, it also has magic, supernatural beings and other fantasy elements. This setting is the combination of real history with mysticism and fables, as it is customary in the Chinese fantasy genre of Wuxia.

== Gameplay ==
9 Monkeys of Shaolin has a 3D side-scrolling progression. There are five wokou enemy clans in the game, one for each chapter. Each clan leader wears a mask from the Japanese Noh theatre, which reflects their personality. The leaders' names are pseudonyms taken from the mask names.

At the end of each mission, the player gets improvement points that can be spent in the camp of the teaching monk. A conversation with him will bring up a single branched technique tree, in which the main improvement subject are different combinations and techniques for each of the three stands.

Multiplayer is available as a cooperative mode of the same story campaign as in single-player mode. Two players can participate in the co-op mode, either online or locally.

== Plot ==
Imperial China, Ming dynasty, Year of the Water Monkey (1572) in Zhejiang. The hero of the game is a Chinese fisherman named Wei Cheng (voiced by Daisuke Tsuji). His parents died at the hands of the Wokou when he was a child. Wei Cheng was taken in by his grandfather, who taught him the fishing business, as well as how to fight with a staff, with this knowledge being passed down from generation to generation in their family.

The game begins when the village is attacked by bandits. Grandfather was killed and Wei was badly wounded by their leader in a red mask. Buddhist monks find Wei Cheng bleeding and carry him to one of the local fortified houses. The hero regains consciousness and finds monks standing in front of him. They say that the village has been completely destroyed, there are almost no survivors, and that there were no ordinary bandits but the Wokou. Their group was sent from Shaolin to help defend both the Buddhist monasteries and the ordinary people but they did not get there in time. Wei Cheng offers to help seven monks and one smuggler.

In cooperation mode, the second player is the youngest of monks called Daoshan.

== Development ==
9 Monkeys of Shaolin was announced at Game Developers Conference 2018 via the ID@Xbox Program. A new demonstration version was shown at Gamescom 2018 in Indie Arena Booth area and at IgroMir 2018. The game received the Critics' Choice award at Indie Cup Summer 2018 and Grand Prize, Best Desktop, Excellence in Game Design, Visual Art, Audio nominations at DevGAMM Awards. It was released on 16 October 2020.

== Reception ==
Reception

Aggregate scores
Aggregator	Score
Metacritic	PC: 71/100 Xbox One: 72/100; PS4: 71/100 NS: 69/100
OpenCritic	48% recommend

Review scores
Publication	Score
ScreenRant	3/5
MGG Spain	70/100

9 Monkeys of Shaolin received "generally favorable" reviews, according to review aggregator Metacritic. Fellow review aggregator OpenCritic assessed that the game received fair approval, being recommended by 48% of critics.
