= Prime World: Defenders =

2013 video game

- Developer: Nival
- Publisher: Nival
- Platforms: Windows, Android, iOS, Facebook, NVIDIA Shield, Kongregate, Android TV
- Release: WW: June 2013
- Genre: collectible card Tower Defense
- Mode: Single-player

Prime World: Defenders is a cross-platform collectible card Tower Defense game set in the Prime World universe. The game uses a Free-to-play distribution model. In December 2012 Prime World: Defenders was announced and released for beta testing. In June 2013, Prime World: Defenders was released on Steam. In June 2014, Prime World: Defenders was released for Android, iOS, Facebook, NVIDIA Shield, Kongregate, and Android TV. The player acts as the Ranger, the tactical and strategic commander of a small group of Defenders. The group performs raids in the deep Prime Zone, fighting Creeps and hunting artifacts. The player collects Magic and Tower cards to use later in battles with the monsters (the Creeps, also known as the Touched). The group is located on the Ballooneer, their mobile base.

A sequel, Prime World: Defenders 2, was released on November 29, 2018.

== Plot ==
In a time when Praia is engulfed in clashes between the Adornians and the Dohkts, the Defenders set off towards the depths of the Prime Zone in search of rare artifacts. During their quest for precious loot, on-board sensors detect an incredible outburst of magic power. The heroes decide they have detected an unbelievably strong artifact and set off to find it. When the heroes locate the artifact, it becomes clear that monsters (the Creeps) found it long ago and have been feeding on its energy ever since. The heroes decide to cut through the enemy hordes and seize the artifact. Once they succeed, they transport the artifact to the fortified castle they use as their base. However, the monsters are not so easily defeated, and they besiege they castle to recover their source of power. The battle brings the heroes face to face with Urd-Nag, a powerful monster hero and the Creeps' leader. The heroes stage the castle's defense, planning to load the artifact onto the Ballooneer and flee. The heroes manage to flee and avoid direct contact with the monsters' leader. As their old base no longer exists, they decide to find a new shelter. Ranger, with his vast Prime Zone wandering experience, tells the rest of the Defenders about a valley hidden between the cliffs. Upon their arrival at their new home, Imir starts to investigate the mysterious artifact and finds a way to unlock its full power and use it for the benefit of the group. The heroes need a Prime Booster and an ancient artifact, the Dragon Claw Sword. The heroes get the Prime Booster as a reward for saving a miners' dwelling from the Creeps' raids. While the Sword is traded for with artifact traders. Once the artifact is activated, it turns out that Imir has used the rest of the group for his own benefit: he leaves the Defenders, having gained incredible power and immortality. Audrey and Ranger are left with nothing and are besieged by Urd-Nag's monster hordes – the monsters sensed the energy outburst of the artifact and have come to reclaim their property. Now the heroes have their final battle ahead of them.

== Gameplay ==
Prime World: Defenders is a mix of Tower Defense mechanics with some collecting elements. At the beginning, the player is offered a starting set of Spell and Tower cards. As the game progresses the user gets new cards, which can later be improved in various ways. There are three card types: Towers for building defenses in battles, Spells that deal damage to monsters and/or weaken them and Enhancers which are able to upgrade Tower and Spell cards.

== Reception ==
Prime World: Defenders holds an average of 58/100 on aggregate website Metacritic.

Game Informer wrote: "Prime World: Defenders had an exceptionally low bar to clear to get me on board, but the staid design and brutal grind managed to miss even that simple goal." IGN said that "Prime World: Defenders has some good ideas, but the execution of its core mechanics lacks dedication." TouchArcade wrote: "It may not be the most original game in this day and age, but TD fans are familiar with such words. Suffice to say, if you are such a fan you owe it to yourself to check out Defenders."
