= Rage of Mages II: Necromancer =

1999 video game

- Developer: Nival
- Publishers: RU: 1C Company; WW: Monolith Productions
- Platform: Windows
- Release: RU: April 1999; EU: July 1999; NA: October 11, 1999
- Genre: Role-playing
- Modes: Single-player, multiplayer

Rage of Mages II: Necromancer is a role-playing video game for Microsoft Windows that was developed by Nival and released in 1999. It is known as Allods 2: Master of Souls (Аллоды 2: Повелитель душ) in Russia. It contains 43 missions and a multiplayer mode that allows play with up to 16 players.

The game is part of the Allods series of video games that also includes Rage of Mages, Evil Islands: Curse of the Lost Soul, Legends of Allods and Allods Online.

== Reception ==
Reception

Aggregate score
Aggregator	Score
GameRankings	62%

Review scores
Publication	Score
AllGame	2.5/5
CNET Gamecenter	6/10
Computer Games Strategy Plus	2.5/5
Game Informer	8/10
GamePro	2/5
GameSpot	7/10
GameSpy	73%
IGN	4/10
PC Gamer (UK)	28%
PC Gamer (US)	68%
Absolute Games	80%

The game received mixed reviews according to the review aggregation website GameRankings. GameSpy said, "While the game is stable, looks and sounds okay, and has a great quest system, it fails to deliver on either strategy, role playing, or any other game elements well enough to keep things interesting or entertaining for very long."
