= Blazerush =

2014 video game

BlazeRush
- Developer: Targem Games
- Publisher: Targem Games
- Platforms: Windows; PlayStation 3; PlayStation 4; Linux; macOS; Oculus Rift; Oculus Go; Nintendo Switch
- Release: 29 October 2014: Windows; WW: 29 October 2014; PlayStation 3; PAL: 29 October 2014; NA: 5 November 2014; Linux, macOS; WW: 19 December 2014; PlayStation 4; WW: 15 December 2015; Oculus Rift; WW: 28 March 2016; Oculus Go; WW: 1 May 2018; Nintendo Switch; WW: 19 February 2019
- Genres: Racing, vehicular combat
- Modes: Single-player, multiplayer

BlazeRush is a vehicular combat video game, developed by the Russian studio Targem Games. The game was released on PlayStation 3 and PC via Steam in October 2014. The first update 1.0.1. was released one month later on November 19 for PC users. The game was released to the Nintendo Switch in February 2019.

== Gameplay ==
BlazeRush is an arcade racing game where players compete with each other on various thematic tracks. The main goal of the race is to cross the finish line first. During the race, players can pick up various weapons with different characteristics. Weapons can be used both for attack and defense. The players can also find a number of boosters, such as nitro, rocket and pulse variations on the road. Unlike most traditional races, BlazeRush puts emphasis on split-screen local multiplayer, allowing 4 players at once, as well as the possibility to drop into the game at any time.

=== Game modes ===
The game has three game modes — Survival, King of the Hill and Race.

Survival

In this mode, the pilot with the least number of 'death' wins. The players are also pursued by an angry boss, so those falling behind risk being overwhelmed.

King of the Hill

In this mode the pilot who leads for most of the race wins.

Race

A three-lap sprint, the winner is the first person to cross the finish line. The results of each race are often spontaneous and unpredictable.

== Plot ==
The game has three planets suitable for life, and thus for the crazy races. As the game progresses, these planets undergo global changes.
