= While True: learn() =

2018 video game

while True: learn()
- Developer: Luden.io
- Publisher: Luden.io
- Platform: Linux; macOS; Microsoft Windows
- Release: March 28, 2018 (early access)
- Genre: Puzzle

while True: learn() is a programming puzzle game developed and published by Luden.io.

== Gameplay ==
In while True: learn(), players begin as a struggling coder who has to create a cat-to-human speech machine to understand their cat. The game's puzzles are solved with loosely based machine learning technologies. Solving puzzles makes you money to upgrade your hardware and get the cat new outfits.

As the game progresses, the player goes from freelance work to running the tech department of a company, or failing to.

== Development ==
In the late 2010s, Russian developer Nival (company) created a department called NivalVR. The department would eventually evolve into Luden.Io. In March 2018, while True: learn() went into early access. Luden.io is a department of Nival focused on machine learning games.

== Release ==
Reception

Aggregate score
Aggregator	Score
Metacritic	PC: 73/100

The game received "mixed or average" reviews according to Metacritic. The game was released on Nintendo Switch and PlayStation 4 in 2020. Xbox One and Xbox Series X and S versions were released in January 2024.

The Sixth Axis rated the game a 7/10, complimenting the original idea for a puzzle game but criticizing the game's difficulty.
