= Etherlords =

- Cover art for the first game
- Developer: Nival Interactive
- Publishers: WW: Fishtank Interactive (I); NA: Strategy First (II); EU: DreamCatcher Interactive (II); WW: Targem Games (mobile)
- Platforms: Windows, iOS, Android
- Release: Etherlords I: RUS: November 9, 2001; NA: November 15, 2001; Etherlords II: NA: October 1, 2003; EU: March 19, 2004; Etherlords (mobile): WW: September 3, 2014 (iOS); WW: November 23, 2014 (Android)
- Genres: Card battle, turn-based strategy, turn-based tactics
- Modes: Single-player, multiplayer

Etherlords (Russian: Демиурги) is a series of fantasy turn-based strategy and card-dueling video games for the PC, by Russian developer Nival Interactive. The first game was published November 15, 2001 by Ravensburger Interactive Media under their mature game label Fishtank Interactive. Prior to worldwide release it was released in Russia one week earlier (November 9) as Demiurges (Russian: Демиурги). It was followed two years later by a sequel, Etherlords II, which was published in Europe by DreamCatcher Interactive and in North America by Strategy First. A third game for the iOS and Android was released in 2014 titled Etherlords, a free-to-play game with automated battles.

The game features a card-based dueling system that borrows heavily from Magic: The Gathering. While the game can be played in a pure dueling mode, the major appeal of Etherlords stems from the scenario mode which utilizes a strategy/adventure map, similar to the one used in Heroes of Might and Magic. Nival later became the developer of Heroes of Might and Magic V.

== Story ==
The world is governed by a force known as ether and it is wielded by the representatives of chaos, kinetics, synthesis, and vitality. The leaders of the four factions vie for supremacy, with the ultimate goal of transcending into the fabled White Lord, the master of all ether.

In Etherlords I, the players may select between two campaigns: Kinet/Vital or Chaot/Synthet. Some of the maps are shared between the two campaigns, and the players simply assume the role of whichever faction they selected. The final mission is one such mission. It also requires that players break with their allies and choose a single faction, and therefore a single avatar, to face the White Lord. The White Lord himself, being a master of all ether, uses spells from multiple schools. Notably he uses a deck that is heavy on Synthet spells, augmented by top picks from the other schools. Upon defeating the White Lord, the victor ascends and becomes the new White Lord.

In Etherlords II, Diamanda mysteriously returns from the mists of legend. She was mentioned in passing at the end of the Kinet/Vital campaign in Etherlords I. A Kinet hero who was captured by the Synthets for experimentation, she appears now as a hybrid Kinet/Synthet spreading the Pale Plague, a sinister disease which drains beings of their energy. The players begin the game as either the Vitals or Chaots, and in a twist, each of these factions' campaigns leads to the campaigns of their enemies; the campaigns are effectively a choice between Vitals/Synthets or Chaots/Kinets. After completing the main campaigns, the players then play as Diamanda. It is revealed that the force behind the Pale Plague is actually the reigning White Lord, who wishes to remain in power for eternity and can only do so by inflicting the world with the Pale Plague. Diamanda was resurrected as a mindless slave for this purpose, but she eventually recovers her sense of self and makes the ultimate sacrifice to stop the White Lord's plans.

== Comparison of Etherlords and Etherlords II ==
The dueling portion of each game is conceptually identical. The latter game introduces many modifications to existing cards in order to balance them or make them more interesting to play with, as well as a handful of new cards (mostly found as Pale spells).

A much more significant change can be found in the scenario mode. Whereas Etherlords I uses a strictly turn-based strategy map in the style of Heroes of Might and Magic, Etherlords II uses a more character-oriented adventure map in the style of Shandalar, the minigame that MicroProse created for its computer translation of Magic: The Gathering. As a result, the first game emphasizes strategic objectives like securing resources and territory, and using multiple heroes, while the second game eschews those elements in favor of making the player collect cards and manage their decks. The most notable effect of this change is that, aside from occasional time limits, the scenarios in Etherlords II do not feature active dangers—the player is free to explore as he wishes without threat of his infrastructure being destroyed. It is more about fighting through a linear path and taking on each monster in the game, and having to adjust a deck strategy against a series of different opponents.

Of particular interest to Magic: The Gathering players are the new multiplayer features in Etherlords II, including a variation of Limited, a popular sealed-pack competition format.

== Races ==
There are four factions in Etherlords. The Kinets and Vitals can be considered the protagonists, while the Chaots and Synthets can be considered the antagonists, as represented in each faction's art style and the single-player campaigns. Four races dominate the lands of the Etherlords. Each race has its advantages, and each has its ambitions, but all want to dominate. From the Vitals attuned to natures and grace, to the vulgar Chaots, the races encompass all the colors of Ether.

=== Chaots ===
Race of Ether of Chaos

The Chaots are a tribal race of brutish warriors. Their connection to fire and lightning is represented by a multitude of spells that cause direct damage to creatures. Common Chaos creature types include kobolds, orcs, rats and bats. Some say the Chaots are the most powerful heroes of all, but those that speak thus would be wrong. For it is not that Chaots are more powerful than other races, but rather that their power is more vulgar. Chaots believe in the attack, and use their powerful spells and unholy minions to unleash a never-ending assault on their enemies.

=== Kinets ===
Race of Ether of Motion

The Kinets are regal, winged beings with an association to air and water. The Kinets possess an arsenal of spells that delay enemy actions, including discard effects. This is somewhat necessary because all of the Kinet's low-cost creatures have only 1 or 2 points of toughness. Common Kinetic creature types include aviaks (birdmen), spirits, and lamias (naga). Slender and fast, the Kinets prefer speed over brute force. They are an intelligent race and value knowledge over force, and their allies -from the aviaks to the Lamias- feel the same. A Kinet hero will parry his opponent's attacks, wearing him down with endless counterattacks until at last his opponent succumbs.

=== Synthets ===
Race of the Ether of Synthesis

The Synthets are cyborgs and as such they employ machines and technology. Their spells utilize biological attacks that steadily cause damage over time. Synthetic creatures are mechanical, and common types include worms, mechs, and even dinosaurs. The Synthets are a strange race, part machine, part human - a race of living beings that eschews the living in favor of the machine. As such they consider their allies the strange pseudo-machines of the Etherlords universe. From quick Wurms to the powerful Cutters, the Synthets field an odd, but aggressive, army.

=== Vitals ===
Race of the Ether of Vitality

The Vitals are a druidic people who possess an affinity for plants and insects. Bursts of ether allow them to cast larger spells more quickly. They also have many spells to gain life. Common Vitality creatures include ticks, treants, and bees. The Vitals are nature's own, and are close to the currents that run through the green-leafed woods, and speaking streams. A looking-good people, the Vitals rely on nature's magic for their power, and claim the creatures of the woods - from the tick to the snake - as their allies. Their attacks are balanced, employing both a clever defense and relentless assault.

== Reception ==
=== Etherlords I ===
Etherlords I

Aggregate score
Aggregator	Score
Metacritic	77/100

Review scores
Publication	Score
4Players	82%
Computer Games Magazine	3.5/5
Computer Gaming World	3/5
Eurogamer	5/10
GameSpot	8.1/10
GameSpy	87%
GameZone	8.3/10
IGN	8.1/10
Jeuxvideo.com	14/20
Joystick	91%
PC Gamer (US)	78%

Etherlords I received "generally favorable reviews" according to the review aggregation website Metacritic.

=== Etherlords II ===
Etherlords II

Aggregate score
Aggregator	Score
Metacritic	78/100

Review scores
Publication	Score
4Players	83%
Computer Games Magazine	4.5/5
Computer Gaming World	3.5/5
GameSpot	8/10
GameSpy	3/5
GameZone	6.8/10
IGN	8/10
Jeuxvideo.com	15/20
Joystick	6/10
PC Gamer (US)	74%

Etherlords II received "generally favorable reviews", a bit more so than the original Etherlords, according to Metacritic.

=== Etherlords (mobile) ===
Etherlords

Aggregate score
Aggregator	Score
Metacritic	78/100

Review scores
Publication	Score
Pocket Gamer	4/5
TouchArcade	3.5/5

Etherlords received "generally favorable reviews" according to Metacritic.

== Reviews ==
- Review in Scrye #52
