= Armageddon Riders =

2009 video game

- Developer: Targem Games
- Publisher: Targem Games
- Platforms: Microsoft Windows; PlayStation 3
- Release: Microsoft Windows (as Clutch); June 2, 2009; PlayStation 3; May 31, 2011
- Genre: Vehicular combat
- Modes: Single-player, multiplayer

Armageddon Riders (also known as Clutch) is a vehicular combat video game developed and published by Targem Games. It was released for Windows in 2009 and PlayStation 3 in 2011. The game received praise for its graphics but its gameplay was criticised as monotonous.

== Gameplay ==
In Armageddon Riders, the player races a vehicle against a number of other computer controlled competitors in various settings, including city, harbour and Large Hadron Collider areas.

== Plot ==
The protagonist survived a catastrophe caused by the Large Hadron Collider, which turned everyone in the city into bloodthirsty zombies. He returns to the abandoned city, looking for a way to change the zombies.

== Development and release ==
Armageddon Riders was originally released on the PC on Steam under the alternative title of Clutch in 2009, but was eventually ported to the PlayStation 3 in 2011. The game was not available in Australia until after it was available in the rest of the world, while it awaited a classification from the Australian Classification Board.

== Reception ==
Reception

Aggregate score
Aggregator	Score
Metacritic	PC: 51/100; PS3: 62/100

Review score
Publication	Score
Push Square	9/10

Armageddon Riders received "mixed or average" reviews from critics, according to review aggregator website Metacritic.

Marck Schoenmaker of PSFocus gave a positive review of the game, giving it 82/100 and praising its variation, declaring that it was "one of the nicer PSN games" the players can find. Matt Raspe of PlayStation Universe also gave a positive review, praising its visuals as "quite impressive", and declaring that it was a good example of its genre.

XGN gave a mixed review of the game, praising its graphics and declaring that killing zombies was satisfying, but also describing it as "monotonous". Ryan Green, writing in Total PlayStation, declared that it "doesn't offer anything intentionally challenging or cohesive", and that it "is a lot of things, but it doesn't do any of them well", though he praised the game's graphics. Kristen Reed, writing in Eurogamer, gave a negative review, declaring that it had an "uninspiring visual style and routine gameplay", and likened it to "shooting fish in a barrel".
