= Planets Under Attack =

2012 video game

- Developer: Targem Games
- Publisher: Topware Interactive
- Platforms: Microsoft Windows; PlayStation 3 Xbox 360; Mac OS X
- Release: Windows, OS X: WW: September 27, 2012; PlayStation 3: NA: November 13, 2012; EU: November 21, 2012; Xbox Live Arcade: WW: November 14, 2012
- Genre: Strategy
- Modes: Single-player, multiplayer

Planets Under Attack is a strategy video game inspired by Galcon and developed by Targem Games.

== Gameplay ==
Gameplay

Planets Under Attack is a strategy adventure game. The player controls a space fleet with the goal to conquer levels and to complete missions in the fight for dominance in multiple planetary systems. Each level provides a diversity of goals, modes and difficulty levels. The player can conquer an entire planet system before an infested planet hatches aliens, or conquer a planet and hold off all comers. Each mission offers three levels of difficulty, with each level unlocking additional challenges.The game mechanics are packed into missions like rotating asteroid belts, changing star constellations and varied objectives. By using tactics to complete objectives, the player will carve out a niche in the galaxy and level up to new ranks. A technology tree enables the player to strategically adapt to the game's increasing difficulty. The right combination of technologies is often the difference between victory and defeat. Technologies affect planetary defense, ship performance, and other boosts.

In addition to the single player campaign and skirmish modes, the game offers an online multiplayer mode with live battles. There are different game modes, Team Multiplayer, Elimination, Capture, King of the Hill, and Domination, two playable races, and different team constellations, Skirmish and Multiplayer. There are unlockable ranks, avatars and rewards.

== Reception ==
Reception

Aggregate score
Aggregator	Score
Metacritic	68/100

Review scores
Publication	Score
Game Informer	7.25
Joystick	13/20

The game was released with mixed reviews, according to Metacritic.

The French magazine Joystick rated the game 13/20, criticizing the game for its repetitiveness but praising its gameplay and intuitiveness.
