= Day Watch (video game) =

- Developer: Nival Interactive
- Publisher: CDV Software Entertainment (North America)
- Engine: Silent Storm engine
- Platform: Microsoft Windows
- Genre: Tactical role-playing game
- Mode: Single-player

Day Watch (Russian: «Дневной Дозор») is a tactical role-playing game developed by Russian developer Nival Interactive, and based on the Russian novel and the film of the same name. It features a group of Light Others trying to combat the schemes of Day Watch.

It is a sequel of the Night Watch video game released in Russia in 2007. The game is powered by the Silent Storm engine.
