= Allods Team =

Russian video game development studio

- Industry: Video games
- Founded: September 1, 2006; 16 years ago
- Founder: Dmitry Devishev; Sergey Orlovskiy

Allods Team is a Russian video game developer and a subsidiary of My.Games. Founded in September 2006, it was previously known as Nival Online and Astrum Nival. On February 24, 2010, Mail.Ru announced the 100% acquisition of Astrum Nival from its former owners. From that point, Astrum Nival acts under the name of Mail.Ru. On September 29, 2011, the studio was renamed to Allods Team.

On 29 September VK sold its gaming division My.Games to LETA Capital, a venture capital firm that invests in software-related startups. In December 2022, My.Games announced it is pulling out of Russia.

== Activity ==
Allods Team is a developer of online video games and mobile applications.

The studio created Allods Online, the first major Russian MMORPG, and later Skyforge. Both games continue to be supported with regular updates. The team has also released Allods Adventure HD, a puzzle game for iOS devices.

The core of Allods Team includes industry veterans who developed acclaimed games including Evil Islands, Etherlords, Silent Storm and Heroes of Might and Magic V. Professionals that played an integral role in the development of projects such as Pirates of the Caribbean, IL-2 Sturmovik: Birds of Prey, Sphere 2, and Age of Pirates: Captain Blood collaborated in the development of Skyforge.

The video game developer employs over several hundred people.

== Projects ==
=== Allods Online ===
Allods Online is a fantasy multiplayer online role-playing game based on the famous Allods/Rage of Mages series of games. Along with the typical MMORPG activity (fighting monsters, completing quests, improving the characteristics of your character, etc.), Allods Online features the so-called Astral travels, a unique concept that gives players the opportunity to build and pilot their own Astral ship, which offers a variety of end-game PvE and PvP options.

Many elements in the game refer to specific historical periods of development of the Russian state, like some of the architecture. Kania's, for example, is reminiscent of that of medieval Russia, and Xadagan is an obvious reference to the totalitarian regime of Stalin's era.

=== Skyforge ===
Skyforge is a MMORPG set in a universe where mortals and immortals fight for survival against mythical creatures and invaders from space using cutting-edge technologies. Players start as immortals newly reborn into the world and vie to become gods themselves. The game has been in development since 2010.

First screenshots of the game were revealed at the private Skyforge showcase at the Russian Game Developers Conference 2012. The game was announced at Game Developers Conference in March 2014.

=== Allods Adventure HD ===
Allods Adventure HD is a puzzle adventure for iOS devices set in the fantasy world of Sarnaut, the Allods universe.
