= Heroes of Might and Magic V: Hammers of Fate =

- Developer: Nival Interactive
- Publisher: Ubisoft
- Series: Heroes of Might and Magic
- Platform: Windows
- Release: NA: November 14, 2006; AU: November 16, 2006; EU: November 17, 2006
- Genre: Turn-based strategy game
- Modes: Single-player, single-system multiplayer, and network play

Heroes of Might and Magic V: Hammers of Fate (Russian: Heroes of Might and Magic V: Владыки Севера) is the first expansion pack to the turn-based strategy game Heroes of Might and Magic V. Like the original game, it was developed by Nival Interactive, under the guidance of Ubisoft.

== Reception ==
Reception

Aggregate score
Aggregator	Score
Metacritic	66/100

Review scores
Publication	Score
4Players	85%
Eurogamer	4/10
Game Informer	8/10
GameSpot	6.4/10
GameSpy	3.5/5
Hardcore Gamer	3.75/5
IGN	6.5/10
Jeuxvideo.com	14/20
PC Gamer (US)	62%
PC Zone	69%

The game received "average" reviews according to the review aggregation website Metacritic.
