= Heroes of Might and Magic V: Tribes of the East =

- Developer: Nival Interactive
- Publisher: Ubisoft
- Designer: Nival Interactive
- Composers: Rob King; Paul Romero
- Series: Heroes of Might and Magic
- Platform: Windows
- Release: AU: October 11, 2007; EU: October 12, 2007; NA: October 18, 2007; RU: October 18, 2007; POL: January 24, 2008
- Genre: Turn-based strategy
- Modes: Single-player, Multiplayer

Heroes of Might and Magic V: Tribes of the East (Russian: Heroes of Might and Magic V: Повелители Орды) is the second expansion pack to the turn-based strategy game Heroes of Might and Magic V and the first stand-alone expansion pack released for the fifth series. It was developed by Nival Interactive and was released by Ubisoft in 2007.

== Features overview ==
Tribes of The East features many previous bugfixes and improvements to the gameplay itself, left undone since the release of Hammers of Fate. Also, new features have been added. The primary attention of the developers has been put on the following game content:

- A new faction was added to the game: the Stronghold. Moreover, an additional upgrade was added to all dwellings, which acts as the alternate upgrades of Heroes V. The player is, however, able to choose between the two upgrades whenever a type of concerned creature is being hired. The actual upgrade is also not permanent; a player can choose to change the creature to the other upgrade for a small fee.
- Continuing the Hammers of Fate story, three full campaigns linking a single storyline are included. The first involves the Necropolis faction, featuring Arantir (the antagonist from Dark Messiah of Might and Magic). The second focuses on the new Stronghold faction, starring the Orcish leaders Gotai and Kujin. The final campaign is primarily focused around the Academy faction, involving the return of the Wizard Zehir from the base game, along with an alliance of other factions against the demonic Inferno armies. There is also a prologue campaign, consisting of a single mission, that introduces the Orcs.
- The combat interface features are redesigned to allow easier access to certain spells, including Rune Magic and Might abilities. New spells have been added with the intent of rebalancing the combat and adding more content to the gameplay. The options for in-game and combat modes have a slight redesign for new settings, such as the creature's health change indicator and life bar span.
- The map editor is redefined to support a campaign creator and feasible to support the previous versions of game maps along with expanded terrain and texture creation possibilities. The model editor for the standalone product only can also be part of the game package upon release.
- Many items are now part of a set that provides additional bonuses when worn together. They are also carried over between missions in the campaigns provided that the hero carrying them appears again. Some of these bonuses are specific to one type of hero, others can be gained by all of them.
- Some racial skills have been reworked, particularly Necromancy. Instead of raising only skeletons, Necromancers can now raise any Necropolis unit provided they can pay enough Dark Energy and suitable corpses are available - for instance, Bone Dragons can only be raised from slain Dragons. The dark energy is renewed every first day of the week.

== Story ==
=== Rage of the Tribes ===
The story begins after a Griffin Empire raid that results in the capture of several Orcs which causes the character Quroq, an Orc chief, to conquer the Haven city Voron Peak, which arouses the attention of the false Queen Isabel, realizing that the orcs are attacking. The queen sends forth her most trusted servant, the zealous Archbishop Alaric to ward off the Orc invasion. The events that happen between this and the next time we see the Orcs are unknown, though Quroq is killed by Alaric at some point.

=== The Will of Asha ===
Meanwhile, the Necromancer Arantir is driven by his mistress, the Goddess Asha, to fight against the demonic corruption in the Haven cities. He meets up with a novice Dark Knight named Ornella, introduced to him by Giovanni the vampire. With Ornella, now turned into a Necromancer, at his side, Arantir sets out towards the city of Flammschrein, the holy city which has been desecrated by the demon Orlando. After killing Orlando, Arantir visits the graves of Flammschrein where he frees a fragment of the true Queen Isabel's soul. Upon doing so, the succubus impostor who had been taking the place of the queen is revealed and she is forced to change plans and take over the capital with brute force.

Arantir however learns of the Demon Messiah and leaves to attempt to stop the prophecy, leading to his appearance in Dark Messiah of Might and Magic. He does not appear in the final campaign.

=== To Honor Our Fathers ===
At the same time (as it is revealed later), the young Orc Gotai takes lead of the Orcs and hopes to crush the demons. In order to do so, however, he must brave many trials, the first of which is to gather the support of various tribes. To do so, Gotai sends Kujin, who manages to assemble an army of Orcs. Gotai then chooses to respect the soul of Kunyak, the greatest of the Orcs who led them to freedom, by going to his burial place in a wizard city. After doing so, he avenges the death of Quroq by killing Alaric. After the false queen was revealed as the Succubus Biara, Alaric had actually gone mad and hoped to kill all the Orcs believing that it was all just an illusion and he still was to follow the wishes of his master. Though Gotai offers Alaric the chance to die honorably, Alaric shows no sign of sanity in his final moments.

During Kujin's travels, it is also revealed that Biara had killed the heir of the Griffin Empire to corrupt the Griffin Heart, an artifact used to repel demons. It now summons demons to bolster Biara's ranks.

=== Flying to the Rescue ===
After the death of Alaric, Gotai and Kujin arrange a meeting with Zehir, with whom they ally for their common causes. Zehir begins by searching for Raelag, who he considers the best source to ask about the rumors surrounding Queen Isabel. While he never finds him, because of the fatal ambush, he allies himself with Ylaya to deal with the renegade Soulscar clan. He then travels to the duchies of the Griffin Empire, where he must help Duncan and Freyda fight off the demonic influence. He does not participate in the fight directly, but he performs a rite that reveals the demons disguised as humans. After this event, the followers of the false queen realize their mistake and instead join Zehir. After Freyda and Duncan manage to fight off the demons, they agree to help Zehir in the final battle.

Zehir then travels to the dwarven mines to ensure the aid of Wulfstan, but the Dwarves who are in constant feud refuse to aid Zehir. Wulfstan, however, tells Zehir that if he manages to find Arkath, the fire god of the Dwarves, then maybe the Dwarves can ally and aid Zehir. After finding the portal to Arkath, Zehir is intercepted by Wulfstan's brother Rolf, who is determined not to let anyone pass until he is declared king. Rolf attacks Zehir but is defeated. After this victory, Zehir, Wulfstan and Hangvul, the spiritual leader of the Dwarves and Wulfstans remaining enemy, confront Arkath. Arkath announces that Wulfstan is to be king and that Hangvul must compensate for betraying him. With the dispute settled, the Dwarves prepare to drive the demons out of the Griffin Empire.

Zehir then travels to Talonguard, the capital city of the Griffin Empire, now overrun by demons. While he makes his way past the guards that defend the way to the city, Zehir's allies destroy the surrounding Inferno towns and blockade Biara, who has escaped on multiple occasions already. The final battle uses all heroes in a constant battle against Biara. After all other Inferno towns are destroyed, Zehir besieges Talonguard and finally confronts Biara, when the true Queen Isabel appears to finally kill Biara. While the Empire has been damaged heavily by her work, the demons have also taken major losses through the work of the protagonists, losing their cults not only in the Empire, but the Silver Cities and Ygg-Chall, home of the Dark Elves, as well. Isabel, tired of the events, then passes the crown to Freyda, proclaiming the end of the Griffin Empire, and the beginning of the Unicorn empire.

== Demo ==
Starting September 27, 2007 a new playable demo of the game would be available for download on Fileplanet servers. It consisted of two single-player custom scenarios: Father Sky's Fury and Agrael's Trial, the latter being unlockable by winning the former, both of which came from the final closed beta test client version that was scheduled for master recording in the first week of October. Both scenarios featured the formal presentation of the Stronghold (Orc faction), presenting the new creatures, town, music, etc.

== Reception ==
Reception

Aggregate score
Aggregator	Score
Metacritic	70/100

Review scores
Publication	Score
1Up.com	B−
4Players	81%
Eurogamer	5/10
GameSpot	5.5/10
IGN	7.9/10
Jeuxvideo.com	16/20
PC Games (DE)	85%
PC Zone	58%

The game received "mixed or average reviews" according to the review aggregation website Metacritic.
