= Night Watch (video game) =

2005 video game

- Developer: Nival Interactive
- Publisher: CDV Software
- Engine: Silent Storm engine
- Platform: Microsoft Windows
- Release: RUS: August 18, 2005; NA: June 26, 2006; EU: September 15, 2006
- Genre: Tactical RPG
- Mode: Single-player

Night Watch (Russian: «Ночной дозор») is a tactical role-playing game developed by Russian developer Nival Interactive, and based on the Russian novel and the film of the same name. It features a group of Light Others trying to combat the schemes of Day Watch.

The game was released in Russia in 2005 and in the rest of the world by CDV in 2006. A sequel, Day Watch, was released in 2007. The game is powered by the Silent Storm engine.

== Characters ==
- Stas — the main character from the story. He became the Light Other in the beginning of the story. He has a short temper and a gung ho attitude. He has a tendency to make wisecracks in tense situations. If the player chooses the shapeshifter class, Stas shifts into a dog.
- Vera — a recently recruited member of Night Watch. She was initiated by Geser (the leader of the Night Watch in the novels). She tends to act as a voice of reason of the group. She turns into a panther (if shapeshifter).
- Yurik — a goodhearted, but somewhat naive member of Night Watch. He was ambushed by Light Others, only to be rescued by Stas. Yurik comes with a 'magical' credit card, which can be used in a near bank, within the same level, for some advanced equipment. If shapeshifter, changes into a wolf.
- Anna — a recently recruited member of Day Watch. Stas was supposed to kill her as part of his initiation. She does not become a playable character until the middle of the game, when she teams up with Stas to stop Zavulon's scheme.

== Plot ==
Over the course of the game, it was revealed that both Day Watch and Night Watch found a way to change the potential Others' affiliation via electronic transmitters. Stas was one of its first test subjects, as he was originally supposed to be a Dark Other. Zavulon was planning to take advantage of the spell by converting all the potential Others in Russia into Dark Others.

== Reception ==
Reception

Aggregate score
Aggregator	Score
Metacritic	54/100

Review scores
Publication	Score
1Up.com	D+
Computer Games Magazine	1.5/5
Computer Gaming World	(unfavorable)
Eurogamer	5/10
GameSpot	5.4/10
GameSpy	3/5
GameZone	6.3/10
IGN	6/10
PC Gamer (US)	43%
X-Play	2/5
The New York Times	(mixed)

The game received "mixed" reviews according to the review aggregation website Metacritic.
