= King's Bounty: Legions =

2011 video game

- Developers: Nival and KranX Productions
- Publisher: Nival
- Series: King's Bounty
- Engine: Unity
- Platforms: Facebook Platform, IPad, Android, Windows Phone
- Release: NA: August 9, 2011
- Genre: Turn-based strategy
- Mode: Multi-player

King's Bounty: Legions is a turn-based strategy social-network game developed jointly by Nival and KranX Productions. It is based on the strategy game King's Bounty: The Legend, which is itself based on concepts from the much older King's Bounty developed in 1990 by New World Computing. It is currently available to play on Facebook, iPad, Windows Phone as well Android devices.

== Gameplay ==
The player controls a party of up to five unit groups, each group containing between 1 and several hundred identical units, chosen among about 50 different types (e.g. druids, knights, pirates, black unicorns, dark griffins, etc.). The units come from 4 different "realms" (Kingdom, Chaos, Ancients, and Beasts) and belong to one of 5 different classes (Warriors, Defenders, Magicians, Archers, and Healers). Unit characteristics are reminiscent of the old New World Computing King's Bounty and Heroes of Might and Magic franchises. The gameplay switches between an overland map where the player's party travels between "villages" following "quests", and a hex-based tactical combat map. In the overland map the main plot is fairly linear and relatively short. Aside from the main quest, there are some special quests and each village (there are about 25 of them) also offers a "daily quest", but all the quests are resolved through combat (no riddles, puzzles or anything). Tactical combat mechanics are similar from other games (e.g. Heroes of Might and Magic), but arguably simpler.

Equipment offers a strategic dimension as defeated units leave various items behind, which can be combined into other items and ultimately serve to craft equipment for the player's party (helmet, weapon, armour, boots, shield, belt, etc.). Since the primary items the player has at his disposal are in limited quantities, the pieces of equipment are best crafted that depend on the composition of ones' party (spending precious resources on crafting an "assassin's knife" might not be the best choice if the players don't enroll assassins in own party).

Aside from the solo play, there are also two types of "player vs. player" battles (one where the army is assembled by another player but controlled by the computer and a genuine "duel") which extend the life and replayability of the game.

King's Bounty: Legions closed the July 8 2022.
