= Hammer & Sickle =

2005 video game

- European boxart of Hammer & Sickle
- Developers: Novik&Co; Nival Interactive
- Publishers: CDV Software Entertainment; T-time Technology
- Engine: Silent Storm engine
- Platform: Microsoft Windows
- Release: RU: April 29, 2005; NA: December 5, 2005
- Genre: Tactical RPG
- Mode: Single-player

Hammer & Sickle (Russian: Серп и Молот) is a tactical role-playing game for the PC, co-developed by the Russia-based companies Novik&Co and Nival Interactive and published by CDV in 2005. The game is set in the same universe (and runs on the same game engine) as Silent Storm, an earlier product by the same company.

== Background story ==
Germany has recently been divided between Soviet and Western zones, the Cold War has just begun, and the Americans still have a monopoly on the atomic bomb.

== Gameplay ==
The player takes on the role of a Soviet commando assigned to operate behind British-American lines in 1949 post-World War II Germany.

The game features an open ended storyline in which the player's actions determine the course of the game. The player also has significant control over the team's movement between game maps and the passage of time, both of which also affect the storyline.

The player can assign feats to the team members with each level-up, as well as outfit them with disguises for moving through towns without attracting attention. A wide range of authentic weapons of the era can be scavenged from dead enemies to outfit the player's team, as well as bought and sold for cash.

As with Silent Storm, nearly all structures are completely destructible with enough firepower. Hammer & Sickle also employs ragdoll physics for bodies according to the precise velocity of an impact. Fully three-dimensional mapping allows for obstruction calculations and cover effects from all angles, bullets ricochet and their stopping power depends on the weapon.

== Reviews ==
Reviews of the game have generally been average to poor, with the polish and high difficulty of the end product being the most common complaint.

== Releases ==
Taiwanese company T-Time Technology translated and released the international Chinese edition of Hammer & Sickle under the name 諜報菁英 (pinyin: diébào jīngyīng) on March 18, 2006. Also, the fan community released an unofficial patch to address issues left.
