= Buka Entertainment =

Russian video game developer and publisher

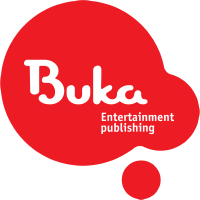
- Type: Closed joint-stock company
- Industry: Video games
- Founded: February 14, 1994; 32 years ago in Moscow, Russia
- Founder: Igor Ustinov
- Headquarters: Moscow, Russia
- Key people: Alexander Mikhailov (Former General director, 2005-2021) Maxim Lelkov (Former General director, March–April 2021), Oleg Kudishov (General director)
- Products: Video games
- Revenue: 2 415 830 000 rubles (2020)
- Net income: 58 728 000 rubles (2020)
- Owner: 1C Company (100%)
- Parent: 1C Company

Buka Entertainment JSC (Russian: Бука) — is one of the oldest Russian video game developers and publishers. Headquartered in Moscow, the company was officially established in 1994. Since 2008, it is a part of the 1C Company.

Although Buka produces its own games, it is mostly known for acting as a publisher for independent developers and a localizer for AAA companies, such as Valve Corporation, Deep Silver, Ubisoft, Square Enix, Alawar, THQ, and others. As of 2017, the company released over 1000 titles for various platforms, including PC, PS4, Xbox One, Nintendo Switch, Android, and iPhone OS.

== History ==
=== Early history and expansion (1994-2008) ===
The idea to start a developing company unofficially hatched among Igor Ustinov, Andrey Antonov, Oleg Beloborodov, and Marina Ravun (Kapustina upon marriage) in 1993. Initially, their working group, provisionally called "Bravo", planned to develop a new gaming console, but later gave up the idea and decided to focus instead on distributing Sega Mega Drive and its games in Russia. In February 1994, Ustinov registered the official company under the name of Buka. Despite the general belief that the name's origins were connected to the word "bogeyman" ("buka" in Russian), the company repeatedly stated that its name is an acronym of the founders' surnames.

In 1994—1996 Buka Entertainment signed contracts with Panasonic and Sony to distribute 3DO and PlayStation games and consoles in Russia. Simultaneously, the company formed partnerships with several Russian companies, developing games for PC. In 1996, Buka began to work in the game-publishing business, starting off with the release of a PC-game "Russian Roulette" in the same year. This item was one of the first computer games developed and published in Russia. Following the success of "Russian Roulette", in 1997-1998, Buka released and licensed Rage of Mages (developed by Nival), Vangers (by K-D Lab), and Hard Truck: Road to Victory (by SoftLab-NSK), thus entering the global market.

In 1998, Buka also became one of the most active representatives of the Russian anti-piracy movement, also known as the "Russian Shield" organization. While the number of licensed games in "boxed" versions did not exceed 2% of the total video games market in Russia, the absolute majority of the sold games was counterfeit. Therefore, the official distributors could not gain enough profit for their licensed products. Responding to this challenge, Buka started releasing games in cheaper jewel cases, thereby equalizing the prices for licensed games with the pirate ones. Red Comrades Save the Galaxy was the first game released in such a format.

A year later the company opened a localization branch and became one of the first official game localizers on the Russian market. The same year Buka released a Russian version of Heroes of Might and Magic III. Although the company had to withdraw the first batch of discs in order to correct some mistakes in translation, the royalty payment that Buka received for the localization, was comparable to the revenue generated by the game's American publisher, The 3DO Company. Over the next years, Buka localized a number of globally popular games, including Wizardry 8, Far Cry, Half-Life 2, FlatOut, Supreme Commander, and others.

In 2000, the company opened a new direction of game publishing - «Bukashka» - and registered a trademark under the same name. The direction produced and localized video games for children.

Until its acquisition by the 1C Company in 2008, Buka released a number of games produced by Russian developers, including a flight simulator Echelon, strategy game The Entente: Battlefields WW1, RPG Battle Mages-NSK, and other items. Among them, the most noticeable games published by the company were first-person shooters The Stalin Subway and Pathologic, released in 2004 and 2005 respectively. The latter game received favorable reviews among Russian players and critics and was appraised with several awards. However, in English-speaking countries it received mixed or negative reviews mainly because of its inadequate English translations.

=== New ownership (2008-present) ===
In early 2008, Finam Holdings and the Norum Fund, cumulatively owning the controlling interest of Buka's shares, expressed their intentions to sell the company. Ustinov, Antonov, Beloborodov, and Ravun, collectively holding the rest of the company's shares, supported this decision. The same year, in July, another Russian video games publisher and developer, the 1C Company, announced the acquisition of Buka Entertainment. Both companies highlighted that they would not merge: instead, they planned collaborative publishing, marketing, and distribution activities. According to Kommersant, the deal value exceeded $60 million; Buka's 2007 revenue had exceeded $35 million with an EBITDA of around $10 million, and investment funds that had bought a 53% stake in the company for $6 million in 2005 sold their shares roughly 4.5 times higher three years later. Ustinov said 1C's "advantages were obvious" as a buyer, citing the companies' existing distribution partnership and joint publishing projects.

Due to the 2008 financial crisis, Buka lost part of its revenue, resulting in the company's massive layoff in 2009. According to Buka's general director, Alexander Mikhailov, the releases of Company of Heroes: Tales of Valor and Saints Row 2 helped the company to recover from the financial losses. In 2010, together with Alawar (bought the same year by 1C as well), Buka published the third part of a popular casual game series Farm Frenzy.

Upon localizing AAA-projects Portal 2 and Might & Magic Heroes VI in 2011, the company opened its own digital shop in 2013. In 2015, Buka gained the status of a licensed publisher on Steam.

In the following years, the company expanded its partnerships with international partners, becoming Activision Blizzard's, Nintendo's, and Steam Controller's official distributor in Russia.

In 2017-2018, Buka participated in several exhibitions. In May, its quest Darkestville Castle was nominated in the category "Excellence in Narrative" at the international exhibition DevGAMM. Later the same year, the company presented its localization of Kingdom Come: Deliverance at § VK Fest. In 2018, Buka appeared with its upcoming release of 9 Monkeys of Shaolin at the Game Developers Conference and Gamescom, organized in San Francisco and Cologne respectively.

=== Indie publishing in the 2020s ===
In October 2020, Buka published 9 Monkeys of Shaolin, a beat 'em up developed by Russian studio Sobaka Studio, for PC, PlayStation 4, Xbox One, and Nintendo Switch. The following year, on August 12, 2021, Buka published Tetragon, a 2D puzzle-platformer built around gravity-shifting mechanics.

=== Leadership changes (2021) ===
In March 2021, Buka's general director, Alexander Mikhailov, died of a stroke. In June of the same year, the company reported the death of Mikhailov's successor, Maxim Lelkov.
