= Heroes of Might and Magic V =

2006 video game

- Developer: Nival Interactive (Note: Freeverse Software developed the Mac OS X version.)
- Publisher: Ubisoft
- Designer: Alexander Mishulin
- Programmer: Oleg Ovechkin
- Artists: Andrey Supryaga; Kirill Naumov; Victor Surkov
- Writer: Jeff Spock
- Composers: Rob King; Paul Romero
- Series: Heroes of Might and Magic
- Engine: Silent Storm Engine
- Platforms: Windows, OS X
- Release: Windows: EU: May 19, 2006; NA: May 23, 2006; OS X February 28, 2007
- Genres: Turn-based strategy, role-playing
- Modes: Single-player, multiplayer

Heroes of Might and Magic V is the fifth installment of the Heroes of Might and Magic fantasy turn-based strategy video game series. The game was released by Ubisoft in Europe on May 19, and then in the United States and Canada on May 23, 2006, with the publisher guiding Russian studio Nival Interactive in its development. Following the closure of The 3DO Company, Ubisoft bought the rights to the Might and Magic franchise, and used Heroes V as a means to reboot the series with a brand-new setting, called Ashan, and no continuity to previous titles.

Like the other games in the series, players take control of "heroes" (leaders with magical abilities) who provide their services for a faction, recruiting an army from settlement strongholds, such as castles, out of various forces (humanoid, undead, monsters, and so forth) and then doing battle against roaming armies, enemy heroes and rival factions. The game features a campaign series that covers six factions from Ashan, along with stand-alone and multiplayer scenarios. Unlike the preceding games in the series, which used 2D computer graphics but with some isometric touches, Heroes V was the first to be completely 3D.

== Gameplay ==
Map view of a bastioned bridge across a river.

A hero can learn a new skill, upgrade an existing one, gain a new ability or create combos of multiple abilities upon gaining a new level or visiting special buildings on the adventure map. There are two sets of skills available to heroes: racial skills and regular skills. A hero can have up to five regular skills and always has the proper racial skill.

Skills are divided into four levels: Basic, Advanced, Expert, and Ultimate. Each skill is associated with three to five abilities, depending on the race of the hero. Each level of skill gives the hero a chance to learn one ability under the skill. That is, a hero with Basic level of a skill can learn one ability, Advanced level two, and Expert level three. An ability is not immediately learned when the hero increases the corresponding skill level.

The racial skill that a hero learns is dependent on their native faction. All heroes from a faction learn the same racial skill and racial abilities. Each racial skill culminates in an 'ultimate ability' that can only be gained by learning a very specific set of regular skills and abilities. In addition to the three levels of skills that apply to regular skills, the racial skill can reach an ultimate level when a certain artifact is worn by the hero.

View of the Sylvan town. During the game, the camera flies through the 3D environment.

There are six factions in the game: Haven, Inferno, Necropolis, Dungeon, Sylvan and Academy. Additionally, the game's expansion packs added the Fortress and Stronghold alignments.

Haven
Haven is a faction populated by humans and ruled by religious warlords; the Holy Griffin Empire propagates "Law and Order" and faith in Elrath, the Dragon of Light. Arising from their military tradition, they have the ability to train their soldiers, promoting them from one level to another. They are the primary protagonists of the game's campaign missions. Their main Heroes are young Queen Isabel and faithful Godric, the king's uncle and the top general for the Griffin Empire.
Inferno
A dark kingdom of demons from the underworld known as Sheogh, the Inferno is a faction which uses "Gating", a method used to summon additional, though temporary, reinforcements onto the battlefield. Making their infernal abode on blasted lava terrain, the demons are the primary antagonists in the game, led by Urgash, the Dragon of Chaos, and their evil overlord, the Demon Sovereign Kha-Beleth. They are the protagonists of the second act of the campaign, where they are led by the ambitious and ruthless Agrael.
Necropolis
Once a secret cult flourishing within the dark underside of the Empire and the Silver Cities, the Necropolis faction resides in Heresh and is ruled by corrupted wizards who worship a twisted spider version of Asha, the Dragon of Order, seeking to find everlasting peace and beauty in death that has been denied to them in life. They can use the dark magic of necromancy to re-animate slain enemies and fill their own ranks with shambling corpses. The Hero for the Necropolis campaign is the shrewd and cunning Markal.
Dungeon
Hailing from the underground empire of Ygg-Chall, the dark elves Dungeon faction are a group of fallen elves whose society is built around faith in Malassa, the Dragon of Darkness, secrecy, plots, and betrayal. They were once part of the Sylvan faction, but became renegades when they made a pact with the mysterious Faceless (in fact they are falsely accused of Brittiga's burning and the king Arniel's death, and they had to turn to Malassa for their survival). They mastered the ability of Irresistible Magic, which made their spells so powerful that even those who had the strongest resistance to magic have little chance to resist. The hero for the dark elf campaign is Raelag, a mysterious and ambitious warlock.
Sylvan
The old Rampart faction from HoMM III in spirit, the Sylvan faction is more distinctly Elvish this time around, residing in the Elven kingdom Irollan which is said to be blessed by Sylanna, the Dragon of Earth. Their heroes focus on archery, and so do their creatures, who can finish off their enemies without touching them. Their racial skill gives entire armies bonuses when fighting certain enemies they have slain previously. They are the counterpart to the Dungeon. The hero for the Sylvan Campaign is Findan, a diplomat and a determined fighter.
Academy
The Academy faction is a town dominated by wizards and magical creatures since its debut in the second game of the series. Not much has changed besides its location, moving away from the snowy mountains of the Tower City in Heroes of Might and Magic III to a vibrant desert scene closer to the original Wizard castle, now filled with middle-eastern dresses. Most of its heroes focus on magic, and their army comprises mostly shooters and flyers. Their Dragon is Sar-Elam, also known as the Seventh Dragon and the very first wizard who had so much power he became a Dragon and helped to banish the malicious Urgash, the Dragon of Chaos. The hero for the Academy Campaign is the young and brash Zehir, the son of the late Arch-mage Cyrus and the new Arch-mage of the Silver Cities.

== Development ==
In August 2003, Ubisoft acquired the rights to the Might and Magic franchise for USD$1.3 million after 3DO filed for Chapter 11 bankruptcy. Ubisoft announced their plan to develop the fifth game in the series under the direction of producer Fabrice Cambounet. This news caused controversy as New World Computing under 3DO had already started making the fifth Heroes game. Although Ubisoft gained access to NWC's progress on Heroes V (which envisioned it as an isometric 2D game in the Heroes IV engine), it was decided to start over and create a completely new 3D game.

== Reception ==
Reception

Aggregate score
Aggregator	Score
Metacritic	77/100

Review scores
Publication	Score
Computer Games Magazine	3/5
Computer Gaming World	(average)
Eurogamer	8/10
Game Informer	8.25/10
GamePro	4.25/5
GameRevolution	B−
GameSpot	8.2/10
GameSpy	3.5/5
GameTrailers	7.7/10
GameZone	8/10
IGN	7.8/10
Macworld	(1.5) 3.5/5
PC Gamer (US)	74%
The New York Times	(favorable)
The Sydney Morning Herald	4/5

The game received "generally favorable reviews" according to the review aggregation website Metacritic.

It was a commercial success. Its sales surpassed 350,000 units by the end of June 2006, and it reached #1 on sales charts in Germany, France and the UK.

== Expansions ==
The first Heroes V expansion pack, called Hammers of Fate, was released on November 17, 2006 in Europe and November 24, 2006 in North America. It includes a new race, the Dwarves, who have exclusive access to a new kind of magic, known as Rune Magic. Other features include the much-awaited random map generator and the return of the Heroes IV caravans. This expansion pack requires the full version of Heroes of Might and Magic V to play.

The stand-alone second expansion pack is called HOMMV: The Tribes of the East and was released on October 12, 2007 in Europe and on October 19, 2007 in North America. Tribes of the East includes the new Stronghold faction, alternate upgrades for all units currently in the game (bringing the total number of creatures to 177), as well as new artifacts and spells.

== Sequel ==
On August 17, 2010, a trailer for Might & Magic Heroes VI was shown on Gamescom. The release date was announced as September 8, 2011, but was changed to October 13, 2011.
