= Prime World =

Multiplayer online video game

- Developer: Nival
- Publisher: Nival
- Platform: Microsoft Windows
- Release: 28 March 2014
- Genres: MMORPG, multiplayer online battle arena
- Modes: Online multiplayer, single player, cooperative gameplay

Prime World is a freemium massively multiplayer online role-playing game and multiplayer online battle arena hybrid game, internally developed by Nival and available for PC and Mac with companion apps for Android and iOS platforms.

Prime World revolves around a battle between two nations, the Dokht Imperium and the Keepers of Adornia, for control of Prime, a critical resource. Prime is a source of energy; an alien substance that alters the world and gives its users power over it. By controlling heroes, players support their armies, capture new territories and attempt to destroy the enemy's base. Prime World players each have their own castles, which are both their main base of operations and home to their heroes. At the castle, players can build various buildings, from mining facilities to decorative structures. Players can also create new talents and skills which can be chosen later, enhancing the selected hero's assets for upcoming battles.

The game's servers and its official websites were shut down on March 31, 2021.

In 2024, the development team published the source code for the fighting part (without the castle) on GitHub – for the community improvement, prohibiting commercial use.

User interface

== Gameplay ==
Prime World combines PvP and PvE session battles in MOBA style with MMORPG-style persistent character progression.

The game uses a castle-building metaphor to display a player's development and a collectible card mechanic for character talents. It has persistent character development between battles and a class system with roles outside of the "tank, mage, and healer" triad. Prime World's main game mode is "Borderlands", which is a classic MOBA map with three lanes guarded by turrets and two bases.

Nival has released four additional PvP game modes: "Dragonwald", with more PvE-oriented gameplay than Borderlands; the fast-paced "Outpost" with a single lane; defense-based "Homeland"; and the zombie-ridden "Apocalypse". There is also a "Shuffle" mode, which is similar to Borderlands but with heroes randomly shuffled in a team. At E3 2013, Nival announced two PvE modes: single-player campaign and co-op "Challenges" missions. Both were available during the open beta weekend in June.

There are currently 425 shared talents available in the game, each of which can be won in battle or produced in the castle. Talents can be upgraded up to four times, using other talents as a resource. There are also hero-specific talents that cannot be upgraded – up to nine per hero. This brings the total number of talents to 803.

You can play Zuma inside the game

Every hero gets experience points for winning or losing a PvP battle and for winning PvE battles. Losing a PvE battle does not give the player any rewards. Getting enough experience will unlock a new level, allowing the player to permanently upgrade a hero's basic characteristics.

As of January 2015, there are 42 heroes to choose from. When the game starts one will be prompted to choose a faction. Most heroes share the same gameplay mechanics for both factions, and are identical except for their appearance. Each faction has one unique hero; Ha'ka and Da'ka belonging to Kingdom of Adornia and Dokht Imperium respectively, they share similar mechanics but have one ability that is different depending on which the player chooses.

Loading screen before the battle

One of the basic talents that was originally available in the game allowed players of different genders to protect each other if they were playing together, and only if they were each playing a hero of their own previously-specified gender. Another game feature was a different in-game heroes pricing policy for male and female gamers. After much controversy this feature was cancelled and prices became the same for both male and female players. All gender features were later removed from the game, including the gender indication in the game interface.

Prime World uses optional Facebook Connect to allow players to engage with their friends in the game, creating teams and using their help to improve production rates in their castle.

== History ==
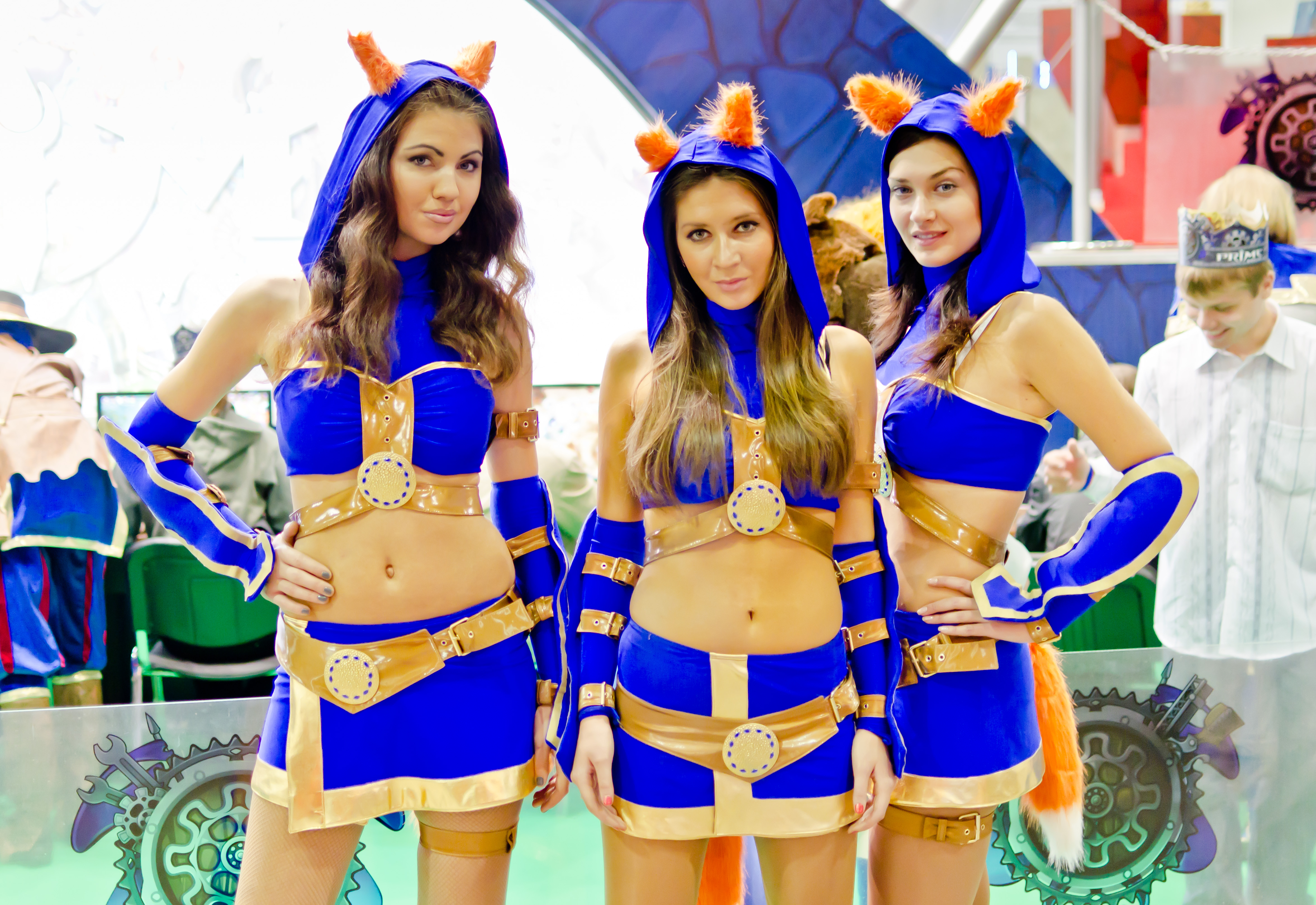
Promotional models at IgroMir 2011

Prime World castle part was developed using the Unity game engine.

== Reception ==
Reception

Aggregate score
Aggregator	Score
Metacritic	65/100

=== Awards and nominations ===
- Electronic Entertainment Expo 2011: IGN PC Best Strategy Game
- Electronic Entertainment Expo 2011: GameFront Best of E3: Prime World
- Gamescom 2011: GamingXP Best Social Game
- Best Russian Game 2012: Igromania
- Best Russian Game 2012: Stopgame.ru
- Best Strategy Game of E3 2013: Flesh Eating Zipper
- Best MOBA of E3 2013: RTSGuru
