= Rage of Mages =

1998 video game

- Developer: Nival Interactive
- Publishers: Buka Entertainment / 1C; Monolith Productions
- Platform: Microsoft Windows
- Release: RU: April 10, 1998; NA: October 13, 1998; UK: February 13, 1999
- Genre: Role-playing
- Modes: Single-player, Multiplayer

Rage of Mages is a PC game that combines role-playing and real-time strategy. Produced by Nival Interactive it was first released in Russia under the name of Allods: The Seal of Mystery (Аллоды. Печать тайны). The game was published in April 1998 in the EU by Buka Entertainment and on October 13, 1998 in the US. It was re-released in 2016 on GOG.com.

A sequel was later made in 1999 by Nival Interactive called Allods 2: Master of Souls (Аллоды 2. Повелитель душ) and published in the west by Monolith Productions entitled Rage of Mages II: Necromancer. An online MMORPG based on the game was released under the name Allods Online. It was published in Russia by Astrum Nival in late 2009, followed by other regions globally by local publishers.

== Gameplay ==
While a role-playing game, the game uses a real time strategy game interface rather similar to Warcraft II.

The player chooses one of four characters (male fighter, female fighter, male mage or female mage) sent to Plagat, capital of the allod of Uimoir, which is part of the Kania empire. On the journey the player will meet the other three members, and more companions. There will be hirelings available for a fee should a player find any mission too challenging and need reinforcements. Each mission takes place in a game map generally full of enemies. Mission type ranges from rescue to escort to exterminate villains to treasure hunting.

== Reception ==
Reception

Aggregate score
Aggregator	Score
GameRankings	65%

Review scores
Publication	Score
CNET Gamecenter	7/10
Computer Games Strategy Plus	3.5/5
Computer Gaming World	3/5
GamePro	4.5/5
GameSpot	7.5/10
IGN	4.6/10
Jeuxvideo.com	16/20
PC Accelerator	7/10
PC Gamer (US)	45%
PC Zone	80%

The game received mixed reviews according to the review aggregation website GameRankings.

It was nominated for GameSpot's "Best Game No One Played" award in its Best & Worst of 1998 Awards, which went to Battlezone.
