= Allods Online =

2010 video game

- Logo
- Developer: Allods Team
- Publishers: Mail.Ru Group (until 2022); My.Games
- Platform: Windows
- Release: October 21, 2010: NA: May 11, 2011
- Genre: Fantasy MMORPG
- Mode: Multiplayer

Allods Online^{[a]} is a free-to-play 3D fantasy MMORPG developed by Allods Team, formerly Astrum Nival, and published by Mail.Ru Group globally, with the international version operated by their subsidiary My.com. The game was originally released in North America on May 11, 2011.

Following on from Rage of Mages, Rage of Mages II: Necromancer, Evil Islands: Curse of the Lost Soul, and Evil Islands: Lost in Astral, Allods Online takes the RPG elements of the original games and presents them in an MMORPG. Developed with a $12 million budget, it is available as a free online game with a simple registration required to play and while no ongoing subscription is required to play, some items are only available in the Items Shop, which allows the developers to profit through a system of microtransactions.

== Gameplay ==
Allods Online has many traditional MMORPG elements such as quests, NPCs, dungeons and pay to boost. It also has an element that is fairly unusual – the ability for players to build ships and sail around in a vast expanse of magical space called "the Astral". In the Astral, players can fight each other in ship-to-ship combat as well as discover new zones like the depths of astral with huge bossmonsters that cannot be reached any other way. Furthermore, ships have individual crew stations which can be operated by multiple players on the same ship together.

Another way for players to test their skills is via PvP on maps such as the Holy Land. The Holy Land tends to be packed due to its position as one of the primary locations of the war between the two factions – the Empire and the League. Open PvP, utilizing a flagging system found in many traditional MMORPGs, is also available in any area of the game, and gives special bonuses to players who quest and hunt while their Flag of War is raised. There are also special areas where players can engage in large-scale PvP activities to earn unique rewards. These large scale PvP areas are called Arenas of Death and are available to players at maximum level and support up to 24 vs 24 gameplay. Open world PvP is also available between factions upon leaving the starting-area, but usually happens first in the area called "Asee Teph" which is part of the Holy Land.

The game also provides a developed guild system that encourages players to work together to improve their guild ranking and allow them to participate in more content, such as the Astral Confrontation, as well as design custom regalia to look unique in the game and benefit special abilities.

The game also features a reincarnation-system which makes it possible to replay the game with another classes while keeping all the improvements the player gained for his char (mounts, bag, scrolls, wallet, etc.) and the option to gain a "lootpet" which will automatically collect all drops from monsters.

== Awards ==
Russian Game Developers Conference 2009: Best Game and Audience Choice Awards

== Reception ==
Allods Online EU and NA were highly criticized in February 2010 for the initial prices in its Item Shop, the system by which the game conducts microtransactions. However, the prices were significantly lowered two weeks later.

Allods Online also implemented a controversial system where players were penalized upon death. These penalties could be prevented or reversed by buying items from the Item Shop. This feature was removed in the EU and NA version on March 2, 2011, since the item that prevents death penalty became available for free at the Item Shop. By August 2012 the North American version of Allods Online had removed the Holy Charms which prevented the death penalty along with the penalty. Cash shop prices were also permanently lowered a few weeks prior for many items. Despite this, Allods Online was considered by many as pay to win due to powerful runes and other bonuses, which were most easily attained via the Item Shop. This led to many international players leaving the game. Later, "pay to win"-mechanics were removed, and the game added a currency exchanger which made it possible to achieve all items as a free player by exchanging in-game gold to the premium currency "blue crystals".

== Soundtrack ==
The soundtrack of Allods Online was created by Vladislav Isaev, the creator of the electronic project Scann-Tec, as well as the composer Mark Morgan, the composer for the first two parts of the Fallout series and Planescape: Torment. The soundtrack was also created by Mikhail "Lind Erebros" Kostylev, who is known for composing the music for the game King's Bounty: The Legend.

The full-fledged symphonic soundtrack for the new version of Allods Online was recorded by the Central Symphony Orchestra of Russia's Defense Ministry and the Bolshoi Choir, whose conductor was Boris Tarakanov.

== Allods Adventure ==
In 2012, Allods Adventure, a mobile puzzle game based on Allods Online, was launched for iOS by Mail.Ru Games.

== See also ==
- List of free massively multiplayer online games

== Note ==
Russian: Аллоды Онлайн, romanized: Allody Onlajn
