= Evil Islands: Curse of the Lost Soul =

2000 video game

- Developer: Nival Interactive
- Publishers: EU: 1C Entertainment; NA: Fishtank Interactive
- Platform: Microsoft Windows
- Release: RU: October 26, 2000; NA: April 16, 2001
- Genres: Role playing game, real-time strategy
- Modes: Single-player, multiplayer

Evil Islands: Curse of the Lost Soul, or simply Evil Islands (Russian: Проклятые земли), is a PC game by Nival Interactive that combines role-playing, stealth, and real-time strategy. Evil Islands introduces a new interface and full 3D graphics.

The game was published in October 2000 in Russia and CIS (Russian version) and a few months later in English.

== Gameplay ==
The game has a mix of real-time strategy and roleplaying elements such as leveling up, acquiring new abilities, learning spells, and buying new weapons and armor. Each quest can be done in many ways, for example using stealth to get past obstacles, going in alone and killing everyone or taking one or two companions with you. However some quests require the player to pickpocket a foe or to take an item from somewhere and use it elsewhere. There are many different ways to get to each quest with each path having its own dangers. There's a deep weapon and armor making feature that allows the player to craft his or her own equipment using blueprints from a town blacksmith and materials found by looting dead bodies or bought from the shopkeeper. However some looted items such as a Banshee cloak or Wolf's fang can't be used for crafting, but instead can be sold for money. Magic can also be used with spells such as Heal, Fireball, Eagle sight, Celestial Lightning, Invisibility, Weaken, Haste, and other such spells for both offensive and defensive use. Bows and crossbows are also available for ranged combat. But the game uses more physical fighting than actual spell casting or archery for combat. But because of the games open ended nature the option to use those methods for combat are still there.

The player can make Zak run, walk, sneak, and crawl. Running causes a lot of noise and attracts the attention of nearby enemies and also decreases Zak's fatigue, so he will eventually have to stop running and rest. Crawling has the slowest movement rate but enemies are less likely to notice Zak when he is crawling, and stealth is increased further during the night. Foes that Zak has to face include but are not limited to Goblins, Orcs, Lizard men, Ogres, Dragons, Humans, Undead, Trolls, Boars, Beholders, and many other beasts each with their own strengths and weaknesses, making the player think on tactics such as watching at the enemy movement patterns or scaring some boars into a pack of wolves to ensure they don't join the fight and aid a single more powerful enemy.

== Story ==
A man named Zak wakes up on an unknown island with no memory of his past and how he got there. He stumbles upon some locals, who refer to him as 'the Chosen' due to the fact he possesses a knife made of metal. Zak makes his way to their village, where the elder, Erfar the Silvertongue, explains to him he is on the island of Gipath. A former backwater of a once great empire, Gipath was cut off from the rest of the world in a magical cataclysm which turned the planet into a series of 'islands' suspended in an astral void, now only connected by portals. Gipath, containing no natural metal deposits of its own, forces its inhabitants make do with mainly Stone Age technology.

As the 'Chosen', Zak is sent by elder Erfar on various quests which serve to improve the safety of the village. Along the way, Zak meets new companions and explores the furthest reaches of the island. Among other things, he learns that the island is being kept afloat by a Great Magician, and a group of explorers from the Khadaganian Empire have made their way to Gipath for reasons unknown. Eventually, it is revealed that Erfar sees Zak as a threat and intended to bring about his death by sending him on so many dangerous missions. Erfar, however, manages to escape before Zak can bring him to justice.

Zak finally meets the Great Magician of Gipath, a powerful wizard known as Tka-Rik. Tka-Rik explains he belongs to an ancient race called the Joons, whose powerful civilization once ruled the world and was nearly wiped out by a demonic entity known as the 'Curse'. Until recently, he thought he was the last remaining member of his race, but he reveals that he has sensed the presence of two Joon youths - a young man and woman. Tka-Rik tasks Zak with finding the two remaining Joons.

Zak is sent first to the cold, snowy island of Ingos, part of the Canian Empire. Here, he tracks down a girl referred to by the locals as the 'Princess', who has gone into hiding with creatures called Wormheads. The Princess is revealed to be the young Joon woman, named Lu-A-Jalla, who tells Zak she has been separated from her lover. After Zak returns her to Tka-Rik, he is next sent to the desert island of Suslanger, part of the oppressive Khadaganian Empire, where the Great Magician last sensed the presence of the young Joon man. Zak finds refuge with a brotherhood of rebels in the hostile land. During his travels Zak learns that the young Joon man was on the run and used a portal to teleport himself away. As only a Great Magician can determine where he teleported to, Zak must use a portal to get back to Tka-Rik. Zak is helped to the Suslanger portal to Gipath by a rebel named Brother Faceless. Faceless eventually reveals that he is actually Erfar Silvertongue, and that all along he was a native of Suslanger. Erfar then attempts to murder Zak. Zak survives and kills Erfar, but returns to Gipath empty-handed.

Though initially displeased at Zak's perceived failure, Tka-Rik then begins to recall that, using powerful magic, he himself physically transformed the young Joon man in order to protect him from the Curse. Afterwards, he sent him to the most remote corner of the world and erased both their memories of the event in order to keep them safe. All along, it was Zak himself who turned out to be the young Joon man; At-Zako. Realizing they cannot outrun the Curse, they choose instead to face it. Tka-Rik summons and confronts the Curse and he and At-Zako (Zak) eventually defeat it in combat, thus securing the continued future of Joon race.

== Multiplayer ==
Evil Islands also has an online multiplayer feature allowing players to do quests, and level up, similar to the solo side of the game but with human players. Quests are different from those of the single player story and have different objectives and rewards. The multiplayer portion of the game is also much harder than normal play especially without other players, encouraging people to group up.

== Reception ==
Reception

Aggregate score
Aggregator	Score
Metacritic	74/100

Review scores
Publication	Score
Computer Games Magazine	2/5
Computer Gaming World	3.5/5
EP Daily	8/10
Eurogamer	8/10
Game Informer	5.25/10
GameSpot	7/10
GameSpy	83%
IGN	8.7/10
Next Generation	2/5
PC Gamer (US)	90%

The game received "mixed or average reviews" according to the review aggregation website Metacritic. IGN praised the graphics and goofy characters. GameSpot noted that the combat animations are good and the fighting is well balanced for different styles of play. However, Carla Harker of NextGen said, "Evil Islands ain't all bad, but it would be a lot more enjoyable if it weren't made so absurdly difficult by random chance." Jake The Snake of GamePro said, "Handsome 3D landscapes—viewable from nearly any angle and filled with rolling hills and nicely detailed objects—give Evil Islands a unique look and feel." (Note: GamePro gave the game 4.5/5 each for graphics, sound, control, and fun factor.)

The game was a finalist for The Electric Playground's 2001 "Best RPG for PC" award, but lost the prize to Arcanum: Of Steamworks and Magick Obscura.

== Expansion ==
An expansion for the game, Evil Islands: Lost in Astral (Russian: Проклятые земли: Затерянные в Астрале. English transliteration: Proklyatie zemly: Zaterjannye v astrale), was released only in Russia on January 27, 2006. It is about the adventures of a young Joon named Kir.

A small team made a mostly machine-translated English fan-translation patch for the text files and graphics in the add-on with updates from September 12, 2021 to January 8, 2023. However, the speech files were not subtitled.
