= List of heavy mortars =

Heavy mortars are large-calibre mortars designed to fire a relatively heavy shell on a high angle trajectory.

== Muzzle-loading ==
| Caliber (mm) | Weapon name | Country of origin | Period |
|---|---|---|---|
| 105 | 10 cm Nebelwerfer 35 | Nazi Germany | World War II |
| 106.7 | Ordnance ML 4.2 inch Mortar | United Kingdom | World War II, Korea |
| 107 | 4.2-inch mortars M2 and M30 | United States | World War II, Korea, Vietnam |
| 140 | 14 cm Minenwerfer M 15 | Austria-Hungary | World War I |
| 148 | Coehorn mortar M. 1841 | United States | 1841 |
| 150 | Mortier de 150 mm T Mle 1916 Batignolles | France | World War I |
| 150 | Mortier de 150 mm T Mle 1917 Fabry | France | World War I |
| 152 | Newton 6 inch Mortar | United Kingdom | World War I |
| 160 | 160 mm IMI Mortar | Israel | Cold War |
| 160 | Soltam M-66 | Israel | |
| 160 | Vafa mortar | Iran | |
| 160 | Patria Vammas M58 | Finland | |
| 169 | 38 cm sLdgW | Nazi Germany | World War II |
| 170 | 17 cm mittlerer Minenwerfer | German Empire | World War I |
| 200 | 20 cm Luftminenwerfer M 16 | Austria-Hungary | World War I |
| 203 | 8-inch siege mortar M.1841 | United States | 1841 |
| 203 | Livens Projector | United Kingdom | World War I |
| 225 | 22.5 cm Minenwerfer M 15 | Austria-Hungary | World War I |
| 240 | Dumezil-Batignolles Mortier de 240 mm | France | World War I |
| 240 | 9.45 inch Heavy Mortar "Flying Pig" | United Kingdom | World War I |
| 240 | 24 cm schwere FlügelMinenWerfer Albrecht | German Empire | World War I |
| 240 | 24 cm schwere FlügelMinenWerfer IKO | German Empire | World War I |
| 245 | 24 cm schwerer LadungsWerfer Ehrhardt | German Empire | World War I |
| 250 | 25 cm schwere Minenwerfer | German Empire | World War I |
| 250 | Mortier Negrei calibrul 250 mm Model 1916 | Kingdom of Romania | World War I |
| 250 | Albrecht Mortar | German Empire | World War I |
| 254 | 10-inch siege mortar M. 1841 | United States | 1841 |
| 254 | 10-inch seacoast mortar M. 1841 | United States | 1841 |
| 260 | 26 cm Minenwerfer M 17 | Austria-Hungary | World War I |
| 320 | 320 mm Type 98 mortar | Japan | World War II |
| 325 | Mortier de 12 Gribeauval | Kingdom of France | 1781 |
| 330 | 13-inch seacoast mortar M. 1861 | United States | 1861 |
| 610 | Monster Mortar | Belgium | 1832 |
| 914 | Little David | United States | World War II |
| 914 | Mallet's Mortar | United Kingdom | 1857 |

== Breech-loading ==
| Caliber (mm) | Weapon name | Country of origin | Period |
|---|---|---|---|
| 105 | 10 cm Nebelwerfer 40 | Nazi Germany | World War II |
| 160 | 160mm Mortar M1943 | Soviet Union | World War II |
| 160 | M-160 mortar | Soviet Union | Cold War |
| 160 | Type 56 mortar | China | Cold War |
| 200 | 20 cm Luftminenwerfer M 16 | Austria-Hungary | World War I |
| 209 | 21 cm Mörser M1880 | German Empire | World War I |
| 210 | 21 cm GrW 69 | Nazi Germany | World War II |
| 211 | 21 cm Mörser 99 | German Empire | World War I |
| 211 | 21 cm Mörser 10 | German Empire | World War I |
| 211 | 21 cm Mörser 16 | German Empire | World War I |
| 211 | 21 cm Mrs 18 | Nazi Germany | World War II |
| 220 | Mortier de 220 mm modèle 1880 | France | World War I |
| 220 | Mortier de 220 mm TR mle 1915/1916 | France | World War I / World War II |
| 240 | M240 towed mortar | Soviet Union | Cold War |
| 240 | 2S4 Tyulpan self propelled mortar | Soviet Union | Cold War |
| 260 | Mortaio da 260/9 Modello 16 | Italy | World War I /World War II |
| 270 | Mortier de 270 mm modèle 1885 | France | World War I |
| 270 | Mortier de 270 mm modèle 1889 | France | World War I / World War II |
| 280 | 280 mm mortar M1939 (Br-5) | Soviet Union | World War II |
| 280 | Mortier de 280 Schneider | France | World War I / World War II |
| 293 | Mortier de 293 Danois sur affut-truck modèle 1914 | France | World War I / World War II |
| 305 | 12-inch coast defense mortar M1886, M1890, M1908, and M1912 | United States | World War I / World War II |
| 370 | Mortier de 370 modèle 1914 Filloux | France | World War I / World War II |
| 420 | 2B1 Oka | Soviet Union | Cold War |
| 540 | Karl-Gerät 041 | Nazi Germany | World War II |
| 600 | Karl-Gerät 040 | Nazi Germany | World War II |

== See also ==
- List of the largest cannon by caliber
- List of infantry mortars
