= Kitchener's Army =

Initially all-volunteer army formed in the United Kingdom

Alfred Leete's recruitment poster for Kitchener's Army.

The New Army, often referred to as Kitchener's Army or, disparagingly, as Kitchener's Mob, (Note: "'Kitchener's Mob' they were called in the early days of August, 1914, when London hoardings were clamorous with the first calls for volunteers. The seasoned regulars of the first British expeditionary force said it patronizingly, the great British public hopefully, the world at large doubtfully. 'Kitchener's Mob,' when there was but a scant sixty thousand under arms with millions yet to come. 'Kitchener's Mob' it remains to-day, fighting in hundreds of thousands in France, Belgium, Africa, the Balkans. And to-morrow, when the war is ended, who will come marching home again, old campaigners, war-worn remnants of once mighty armies? 'Kitchener's Mob.'" —Kitchener's Mob: Adventures of an American in the British Army by James Norman Hall, 1916) was an (initially) all-volunteer portion of the British Army formed in the United Kingdom from 1914 onwards following the outbreak of hostilities in the First World War in late July 1914. It originated on the recommendation of Herbert Kitchener, then the Secretary of State for War to obtain 500,000 volunteers for the Army. Kitchener's original intention was that these men would be formed into units that would be ready to be put into action in mid-1916, but circumstances dictated the use of these troops before then. The first use in a major action of Kitchener's Army units came at the Battle of Loos (September–October 1915).

== Origins ==
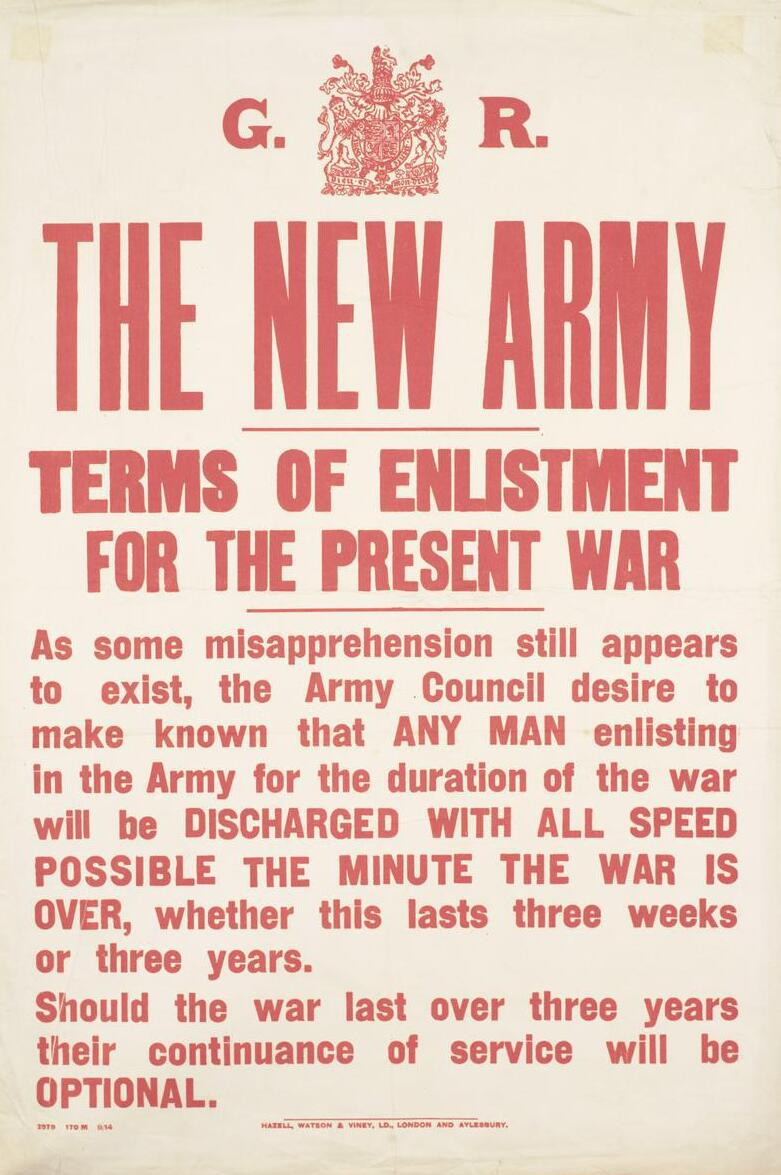
1914 poster describing terms of enlistment

Contrary to the popular belief that the war would be over by Christmas 1914, Kitchener predicted a long and brutal war. He believed that arrival in Europe of an overwhelming force of new, well-trained and well-led divisions would prove a decisive blow against the Central Powers. Kitchener fought off opposition to his plan, and attempts to weaken or water down its potential, including piece-meal dispersal of the New Army battalions into existing regular or Territorial Force divisions (the view of the Commander-in-Chief of the British Expeditionary Force (BEF), Field Marshal French). Kitchener declined to use the existing Territorial Force (set up by Lord Haldane and Douglas Haig as part of the Army reforms of the Edwardian period) as the basis for the New Army, as many of its members had volunteered for "Home Service" only, and because he was suspicious of the poor performance of French "territorials" in the Franco-Prussian War 1870–1871. In the early days of the war, the Territorial Force could not reinforce the regular army, as it lacked modern equipment, particularly artillery. In addition, it took time to form first-line units composed only of men who had volunteered for "General Service".

Those recruited into the New Army were used to form complete battalions under existing British Army regiments. These new battalions had titles of the form "xxth (Service) Battalion, <regiment name>". The first New Army divisions were first used in August 1915 at Suvla Bay during the Gallipoli Campaign and also the Battle of Loos on the Western Front in the autumn of 1915; they were sorely tested in the Battle of the Somme. The initial British Expeditionary Force—a single army of five regular divisions in August 1914, grew to two field armies comprising 16 divisions by the end of 1914 when the Territorials had been deployed, and to five armies totalling around 60 divisions in strength by the summer of 1916; approximately 2 million men, of whom around half were infantry (the rest were gun crews, supply and logistics men etc.)

== Recruitment ==
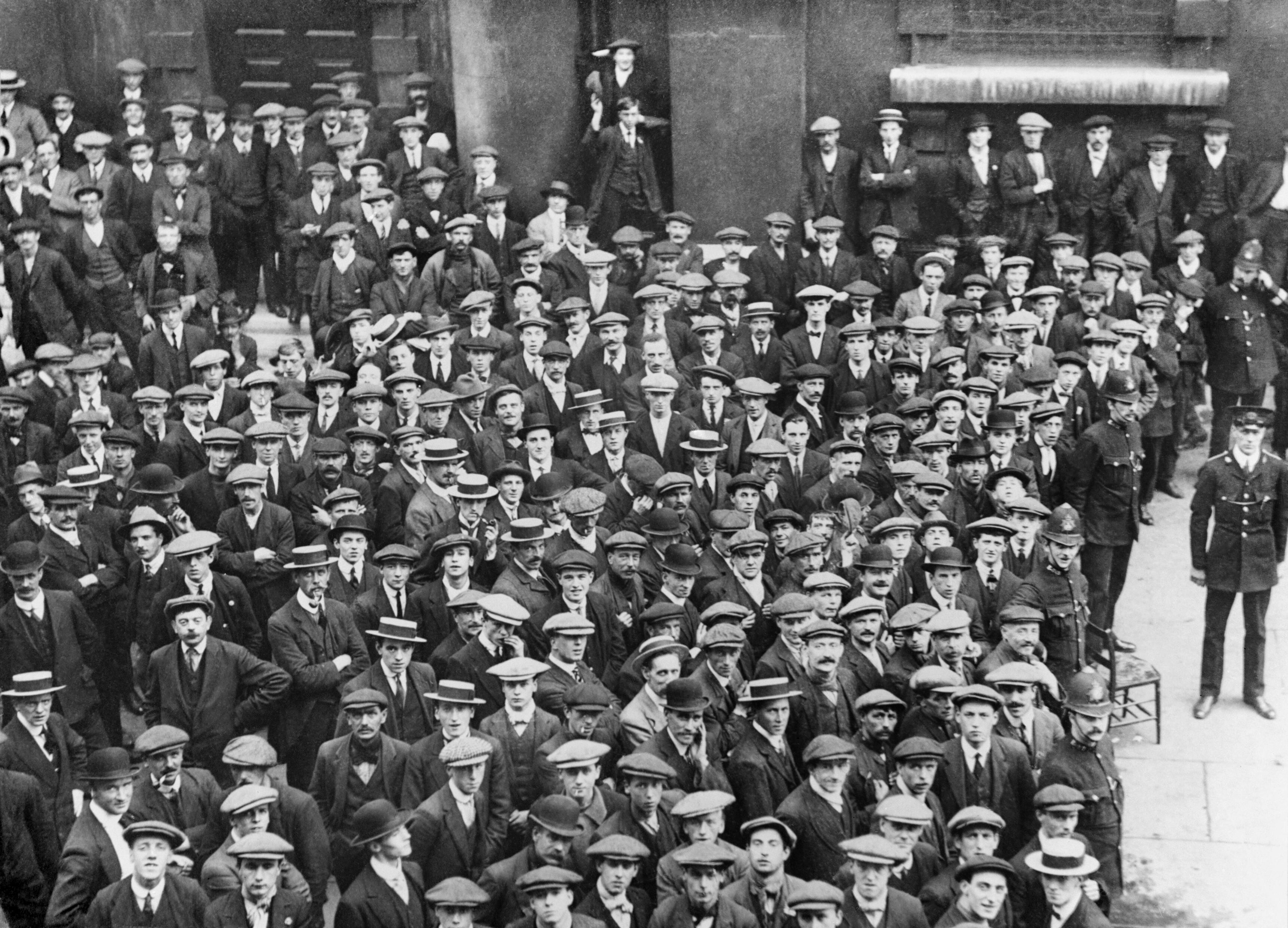
British Volunteer recruits in London, August 1914

All five of the full army groups (meaning a group of divisions similar in size to an army, not a group of armies) were made up of volunteer recruits, which included the famous Pals' Battalions. Due to the huge numbers of men wishing to sign up, in places queues up to a mile long formed outside recruitment offices, there were many problems in equipping and providing shelter for the new recruits. Rapidly the Government added many new recruitment centres, which eased the admissions burden, and began a programme of temporary construction at the main training camps. By 12 September, almost half a million men had enlisted. The priority placement of recruits was to make up the strength of K1 units, then the Reserve battalions, and then the K2 units. Almost 2.5 million men volunteered for Kitchener's Army. The War Office stipulated that NCOs for these new formations should be selected from those men reenlisting. (Note: Men 'who may be promoted from the rank they formerly held.')

By the beginning of 1916, enthusiasm for volunteering had waned. Great Britain resorted to conscription under the Military Service Act 1916, like the other great powers involved in the war. (Conscription was also applied "in reverse", so that skilled workers and craftsmen who had volunteered early in the war could be drafted back into the munitions industry, where they were sorely needed.)

The first conscripts arrived in France in late 1916 to fill the gaps in the volunteer units, which had been greatly diminished during the Battle of the Somme. After the bloody battles of 1916 and 1917, many of the British Army facing the Ludendorff Offensive of 1918 were conscripts, many of whom were youths under 21 years of age, or in their late thirties or older. Many of the other soldiers were men of lower levels of fitness who had volunteered earlier in the war and had since been "combed out" of rear echelon jobs. Roughly half of those who served in the British Army throughout the war, including more than half of the five million men serving in the British Army in 1918, were conscripts.

== Training ==
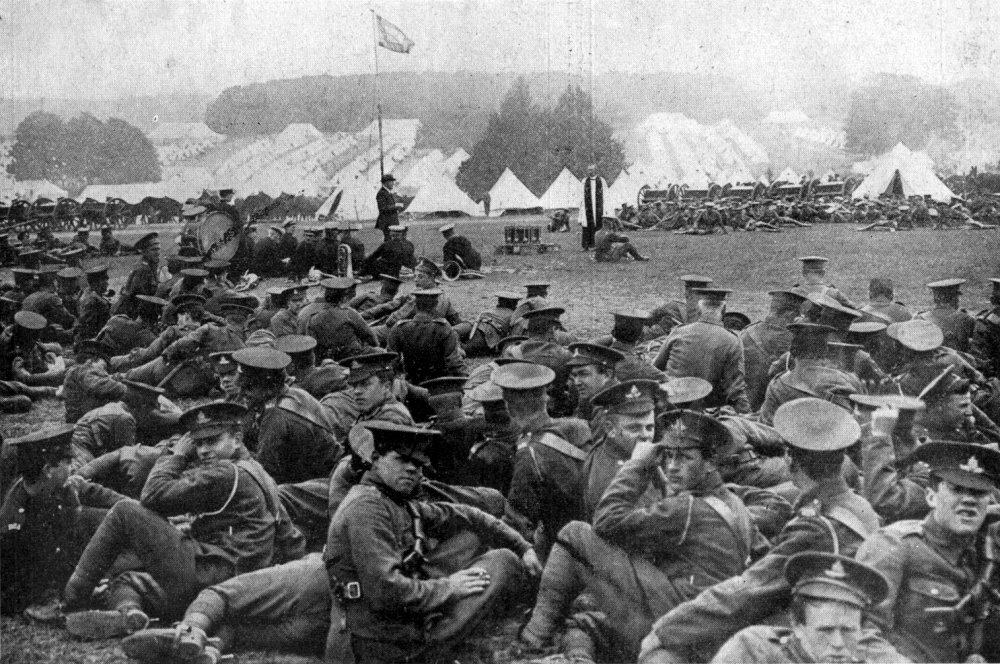
A Church of England service at the 10th (Irish) Division's camp at Basingstoke in 1915

The British Army traditionally recruited on a regimental basis, therefore a recruit accepted into the Army was first sent to his new regiment's depot, where he received his kit (Note: his basic uniform, boots, webbing etc) and was introduced to army discipline and training. Next he was sent to the main training camps to join his battalion. In practice, no regiment had the required stocks of equipment, or the manpower to train the flood of recruits; men trained wearing their own clothes and shoes. To mitigate this problem, the army issued old stored uniforms, including First Boer War–vintage red jackets. Some regiments bought their own uniform and boots with money paid from public collections. Many regiments were also issued with emergency blue uniforms, popularly known as Kitchener Blue. Whilst this crisis went on, the soldiers wore regimental and unit badges or patches on their clothing. Many photographs from the era show uniformed soldiers drilling alongside civilian clothed soldiers, perhaps led by red-jacketed NCOs.

The Regiments also suffered from a lack of officers to train them. The government called up all reserve-list officers and any British Indian Army officer who happened to be on leave in the UK during the period. Men who had been to a recognised public school and university graduates, many of whom had some prior military training in Officer Training Corps, were often granted direct commissions. Commanding officers were encouraged to promote promising leaders and later in the war it was common for officers ("temporary gentlemen") to have been promoted from the ranks to meet the demand, especially as casualty rates among junior infantry officers were extremely high. Many officers, both regular and temporary, were promoted to ranks and responsibilities far greater than they had ever realistically expected to hold.

The Army had difficulty supplying new units with enough weapons. No artillery pieces had been left in Britain to train new artillery brigades, and most battalions had to drill with obsolete rifles or wooden mockups. By early 1915 the Government had overcome many of these problems. Among its methods was pressing into use old ceremonial cannons and unfinished modern artillery pieces which lacked targeting sights. During 1915, it corrected such shortages.

== Later developments ==
At the beginning of 1918, the shortage of manpower in the British Expeditionary Force in France became acute. The Army ordered infantry divisions to be reduced from twelve infantry battalions to nine. The higher-numbered battalions (in effect the New Army units, and some Second-Line Territorial units) were to be disbanded rather than the lower-numbered Regular and First-Line Territorial battalions. (Since Kitchener's death in 1916, no other major figure opposed this fundamental change to the principles on which the New Army had been raised.) In some cases, New Army divisions had to disband about half of their units to make room for surplus battalions transferred from Regular or First-Line Territorial divisions. While the change reduced the unique sense of identity of some New Army formations, it developed the divisions in France into more homogeneous units. By this time there was no longer much real distinction between Regular, Territorial, and New Army divisions.

== Structure ==
Kitchener's New Army was made up of the following Army Groups (meaning a group of divisions similar in size to an army, not a group of armies) and Divisions:

=== K1 Army Group ===
- 9th (Scottish) Division
- 10th (Irish) Division
- 11th (Northern) Division
- 12th (Eastern) Division
- 13th (Western) Division
- 14th (Light) Division—originally 8th (Light) Division but renumbered when the regular army 8th Division was formed in September 1914.

=== K2 Army Group ===
- 15th (Scottish) Division
- 16th (Irish) Division
- 17th (Northern) Division
- 18th (Eastern) Division
- 19th (Western) Division
- 20th (Light) Division

=== K3 Army Group ===
- 21st Division
- 22nd Division
- 23rd Division
- 24th Division
- 25th Division
- 26th Division

=== Original K4 Army Group ===
Kitchener's Fourth New Army was formed from November 1914 with

- 30th Division
- 31st Division
- 32nd Division
- 33rd Division
- 34th Division
- 35th Division

The divisions were not fully formed when the decision was made to use them to provide replacements for the first three New Armies. The divisions were broken up on 10 April 1915; the infantry brigades and battalions became reserve formations and the other divisional troops were transferred to the divisions of the newly created Fourth and Fifth New Armies.

=== K4/K5 Army Group ===
Redesignated K4 following breakup of original K4.

- 30th Division—originally designated as 37th Division
- 31st Division—originally designated as 38th Division
- 32nd Division—originally designated as 39th Division
- 33rd Division—originally designated as 40th Division
- 34th Division—originally designated as 41st Division
- 35th Division—originally designated as 42nd Division

=== K5 Army Group ===
Following the re-designation of the previous K5 Army Group, a new K5 Army Group was formed.

- 36th (Ulster) Division—raised as the Ulster Division, numbered on 28 August 1914.
- 37th Division—originally designated as 44th Division
- 38th (Welsh) Division—originally designated as 43rd Division
- 39th Division
- 40th Division
- 41st Division

=== Divisional structure in 1915 ===
In 1915, the prescribed structure of a division would have comprised the following units:

- Divisional HQ
- Infantry:
  - 3 brigades, each comprising:
    - 4 battalions (with 4 machine guns each)
- Mounted troops:
  - 1 cavalry squadron
  - 1 cyclist company
- Artillery:
  - HQ Divisional Artillery
  - 3 field artillery brigades (each of 4 batteries of four 18 pounders and one ammunition column)
  - 1 field artillery howitzer brigade (of 4 batteries of four 4.5" howitzers and an ammunition column)
  - 1 heavy battery (four 60 pounders with an ammunition column)
  - 1 divisional ammunition column
- Engineers:
  - HQ Divisional Engineers
  - 3 field companies
- Signals Service:
  - 1 signal company
- Pioneers:
  - 1 pioneer battalion (with 4 machine guns)
- 3 field ambulances
- 1 sanitary section
- 1 mobile veterinary section
- 1 motor ambulance workshop
- 1 divisional train

Number of troops and equipment:

- All ranks: 19,614
- Horses & mules: 5,818
- Guns:
  - 48 × 18 pounders
  - 16 × 4.5" howitzers
  - 4 × 60 pounders
- Vickers machine guns: 52
- Assorted carts & vehicles: 958
- Cycles: 538
- Motor vehicles:
  - cycles: 19
  - cars: 11
  - lorries: 4
  - ambulances: 21

=== Divisional structure in 1918 ===
In 1918, a typical division would have comprised the following units:

- Divisional HQ
  - Infantry
  - 3 brigades,
    - each comprising 3 battalions, with 36 Lewis Guns (light machine guns) each
    - and one light trench mortar battery with eight 3" Stokes
- Artillery
  - H.Q. Divisional Artillery
  - 2 field artillery brigades
    - each comprising three batteries with six 18 pounders and one battery of six 4.5" howitzers
  - 2 medium trench mortar batteries with 6 × 2" "toffee apple" mortars each, or later 6" mortars
  - 1 divisional ammunition column
- Engineers
  - H.Q. Divisional Engineers
  - 3 field companies
- Signals Service
  - 1 signal company
- Pioneers
  - 1 pioneer battalion, 12 Lewis Guns
- Battalion, Machine Gun Corps
  - comprising 4 companies, with 16 Vickers machine guns each
- 3 field ambulances
- 1 sanitary section
- 1 mobile veterinary section
- 1 motor ambulance workshop
- 1 divisional train

Number of troops and equipment:

- All ranks: 16,035
- Horses & mules: 3,838
- Guns: 48
  - 18 pounders: 36
  - 4.5" howitzers: 12
  - trench mortars: 36
    - Stokes: 24
    - Medium: 12
- Machine guns: 400
  - Vickers: 64
  - Lewis: 336
- Assorted carts & vehicles: 870
- Cycles: 341
- Motor cycles: 44
- Motor cars: 11
- Motor lorries: 3
- Motor ambulances: 21

== See also ==
- List of British divisions in World War I

== Bibliography ==
- Becke, Archibald F. (1938). Order of Battle of Divisions Part 3A. New Army Divisions (9–26). London: HMSO. OCLC 4405016.
- Becke, Archibald F. (1945). Order of Battle of Divisions Part 3B. New Army Divisions (30-41) & 63rd (R.N.) Division. London: HMSO. OCLC 4405016.
- Beckett, Ian, Timothy Bowman, and Mark Connelly. The British Army and the First World War (Cambridge University Press, 2017)
- Carrington, Charles E. (1978). "Kitchener's Army: The Somme and After". The RUSI Journal. 123 (1): 15–20. doi:10.1080/03071847809426027.
- Ginzburg, Carlo. "‘Your Country Needs You’: A Case Study in Political Iconography." History Workshop Journal. No. 52. 2001.
- Medlicott, W.N. (1967). Contemporary England 1914-1964. Longmans.
- Royle, Trevor. Kitchener Enigma: The Life and Death of Lord Kitchener of Khartoum, 1850-1916 (The History Press, 2016).
- Simkins, Peter (2007). Kitchener's Army: The Raising of the New Armies, 1914–16. Barnsley, South Yorkshire: Pen & Sword Military. ISBN 978-1-84-415585-9.
- Smithers, A. J., The Fighting Nation: Lord Kitchener and His Armies (Pen & Sword, 1994) ISBN 978-0-850-52389-8
