= 2-inch medium mortar =

Smooth bore muzzle loading medium trench mortar

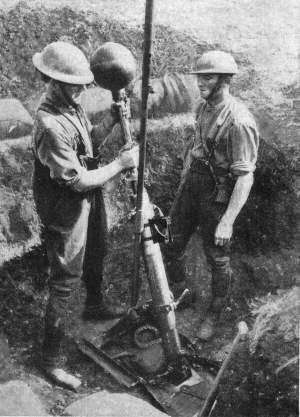
- British troops loading a 2-inch trench mortar with attached periscope post, World War I. This appears to be a training exercise as no fuze is visible.
- Type: Medium mortar
- Place of origin: United Kingdom

Service history
- In service: 1915–1917
- Used by: British Empire
- Wars: World War I

Production history
- Designer: Royal Ordnance Factory
- Manufacturer: various contractors
- No. built: 1907

Specifications
- Mass: 105 lb (48 kg)
- Barrel length: bore: 3 ft (0.91 m) total: 3 ft 5 in (1.04 m)
- Crew: 5 per mortar 25 per battery of 4
- Shell: HE 51 lb (23 kg); Smoke
- Calibre: 2 inch (50.8 mm) mortar barrel, not bomb
- Rate of fire: 2-3 per minute
- Effective firing range: 100 yd (90 m) min 570 yd (520 m) max depending on charge
- Filling: Amatol or Ammonal
- Filling weight: 12.5 lb (5.6 kg)

The 2 inch medium trench mortar, also known as the 2-inch howitzer, and nicknamed the "toffee apple" or "plum pudding" mortar, was a British smooth bore muzzle loading (SBML) medium trench mortar in use in World War I from mid-1915 to mid-1917. The designation "2-inch" refers to the mortar barrel, into which only the 22 in (560 mm) bomb shaft but not the bomb itself was inserted; the spherical bomb itself was actually 9 in (230 mm) in diameter and weighed 42 lb (19 kg); hence this weapon is more comparable to a standard mortar of approximately 5–6 in (130–150 mm) bore.

== Background and predecessors ==
As the Western Front in France and Belgium stagnated into trench warfare in late 1914, British forces found themselves with no means of replying to the German minenwerfers (trench mortars) which were lobbing both small and large (over 100 lb (45 kg)) high-explosive shells into their frontline trenches from short range. British commanders requested an accurate short-range weapon which was manually portable in the trenches, could be safely used to attack enemy trenches as close as 100 yd (91 m) to the British trenches, was easily concealed and projected a reasonably large explosive charge capable of damaging protected enemy positions. The British Expeditionary Force had been expected to participate only in mobile warfare and was not equipped with any mortars.

Various alternative designs for light and medium mortars were evaluated, prompted by the need to place at least some weapon into action without diverting manufacturing capacity from guns and howitzers, which weapons were given priority. Hence the emphasis was on designs for both mortar and ammunition that could be manufactured by small unsophisticated workshops unsuited to other war work:

=== 4-inch mortar ===
4-inch mortar bomb at the Imperial War Museum

- The 4 in (100 mm) mortar was the only official type to enter service before the end of 1914 (12 units). It fired an 8.5 lb (3.9 kg) pound steel bomb with studs to engage rifling grooves in the mortar barrel, similar to the German minenwerfer. The barrel was improvised by boring out a 6 in (150 mm) shell. Its range of 900 yd (820 m) and its accuracy was considered acceptable, but the shell case was expensive and was slow to load. About 40 guns and several thousand rounds were issued by June 1915, with 168 of the total 300 manufactured eventually serving in France. It was soon replaced by the 3 in (76 mm) Stokes mortar in its "light mortar" class.

=== 3.7-inch mortar ===
- The 3 in (76 mm) pipe gun was an early improvised mortar. Eighteen were initially made by the Indian Corps in France by December 1914. It was a smooth tube firing a 4.5 lb (2.0 kg) "tin-pot" filled with ammonal. The fuze was a length of Bickford fuse ignited by the burning of the propellant, which made it too dangerous for long term use. By the end of June 1915, another 100 had been manufactured and sent to France and 20 to Gallipoli.

=== Vickers 1.57-inch mortar ===
- The Vickers 1.57 in (40 mm) trench mortar was first introduced to France in March 1915, 127 by the end of June, and about 275 were manufactured until it was withdrawn in January 1917, after being replaced by the 2-inch mortar. The 1.57-inch was similar to the eventual 2-inch model, but the particular Vickers design was complicated and expensive to manufacture. It fired either an 18 or 33 lb (8.2 or 15.0 kg) cast-iron bomb filled with Permite (perchlorate), but the smaller bomb was considered too light and the heavier had a range of only 200 yd (180 m).

== The 2-inch medium mortar ==
This was designed and manufactured by the Royal Ordnance Factories in early 1915 and introduced along with the 1.57-inch mortar in March 1915. It incorporated what was known of the German prewar Krupp mortar. This was the first design to meet all the requirements, after modifications to simplify manufacture; it fired a good-sized spherical cast-iron bomb of 42 lb (19 kg) (total projectile weight 51 lb (23 kg) with stick and fuze), considered the largest practical size for use from trenches, at ranges from 100 to 600 yd (91 to 549 m) using a simple 2-inch tube as the mortar body. The mortar and ammunition could be cheaply manufactured by small unsophisticated "trade" workshops; the bomb was safely detonated by a standard No. 80 "time and percussion" artillery fuze. Drawbacks were that the steel tail was usually projected backwards towards the firer when the bomb detonated, resulting in occasional casualties and the No. 80 fuze was also required by the 18-pounder field guns which were given priority, limiting mortar ammunition supply to the front until early 1916 when a special cheap trench mortar fuze was developed.

The 2-inch mortar served in limited numbers in France in 1915 from March, with early mortars and ammunition made by the Royal Ordnance Factory, with the Vickers 1.57-inch model. Mass production began with an order in August 1915 for 800 mortars from several railway workshops and agricultural machinery makers, together with an order for 675,000 bombs from numerous small firms. Manufacture of the Vickers model which was twice as expensive was ended and it was withdrawn by January 1917.

It fired a spherical cast-iron bomb "the size of a football" painted dirty white filled with amatol (identified by a painted green band) or ammonal (identified by a painted pink band) attached to the end of a pipe ("stick"), hence the nicknames "toffee apple" and "plum pudding". Weights of bombs as delivered without fuzes varied. Light bombs, from 39 lb 14 oz to below 40 lb 10 oz (18.09 to 18.43 kg), were marked with a stenciled L. Heavy bombs, above 41 lb 10 oz to 42 lb 6 oz (18.43 to 19.22 kg) were marked with a stenciled Hv. Hence the total fuzed weight with stick of 51 lb is an average.

The 2-inch designation refers to the mortar barrel's bore and the projectile stick inserted into it, not the much larger bomb itself which remained outside the barrel. It was comparable in explosive power if not range to other 4-inch mortars.

The 2-inch mortar was itself superseded by the Newton 6-inch mortar from mid-1917 onwards. Some Australian units retained them for projecting smoke screens.

== Combat use ==
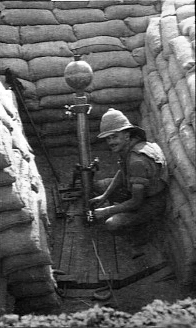
Typical mortar pit, Mesopotamia 1917, with firing lanyard laid out. The bomb is fuzed.

=== Deployment ===
The weapon was initially operated by joint infantry and artillery detachments, eventually it became the responsibility of the Royal Field Artillery. A typical infantry division was equipped with three batteries designated X, Y, Z, each with four mortars.

=== Use in action ===
Its primary use was in cutting barbed wire defenses and attacking enemy front line trenches, such as in the July 1916 attack on the Somme. The spherical shape and relatively low velocity brought the benefit that the bomb did not penetrate the ground before exploding. The short range was a disadvantage as it could only be used if no man's land (between the British and enemy front line) was relatively narrow. It was used to fire some white star (50%-50% chlorine and phosgene) gas bombs during the Battle of the Somme until other specialised longer range projectors became available.

Cordite charges appropriate to the required range were dropped into the barrel before the bomb was loaded. Charges and ranges:

- 1.5 ounces (40 g): 100–220 yards (90–200 m) (dangerous due to propensity for incomplete burn and hence to fall short)
- 2.5 ounces (70 g): 180–340 yards (160–310 m)
- 3.5 ounces (100 g): 300–500 yards (270–460 m)

The original design for igniting the powder propellant charge involved the insertion of a standard artillery "T friction tube" into a hole near the base of the barrel. The Royal Artillery had a higher priority in receiving the already insufficient number of tubes so ignition was changed to use a Lee–Enfield bolt mechanism and chamber screwed into a socket in the barrel near the base. A special blank rifle cartridge was loaded and fired via a lanyard from a sheltered position if possible due to the risk of bombs falling short. This ignited the propellant charge and launched the bomb.

In early use it was situated in frontline trenches but this tended to attract enemy fire onto the troops manning them. Standard procedure became to locate the mortars separately from frontline trenches, in unoccupied trenches or in saps running off the frontline. This had the benefit of drawing enemy fire away from troops manning the front line.

Estimated rounds required for various targets, with instantaneous percussion fuze 107:

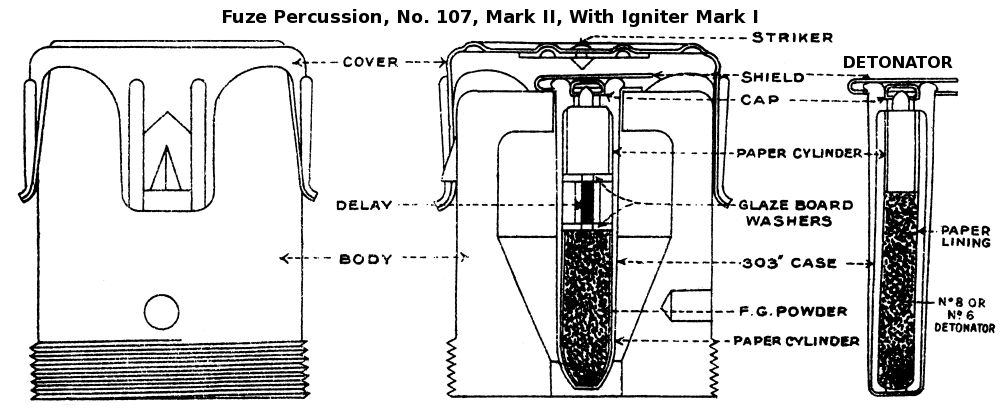
Fuze No. 107

- Cutting barbed wire: 1 round per 10 square yards (8 m^{2})
- Cutting loose wire: 1 round per 6 square yards (5 m^{2})
- Destroy trenches frontally: 5 rounds per yard
- Destroy trenches in enfilade: 2.5 rounds per yard
- Destroy a machine-gun emplacement with top cover not more than 3 feet of earth: 80 rounds

=== Silencer ===
Provision was made in mid-1916 for attachment of the "Temple silencer" at the muzzle, intended to reduce the flash and noise generated on firing, which at the short ranges the mortar operated at was quickly noticed by the enemy and invited artillery response. This required the use of bombs with a special piston attached to the tail which was retained in the barrel by the silencer on firing, and hence sealed the muzzle after the bomb tail left the barrel. This had the major disadvantage of causing the barrel to overheat during prolonged daylight firing, and the silencer was only used at night.

=== Use as anti-tank mines ===
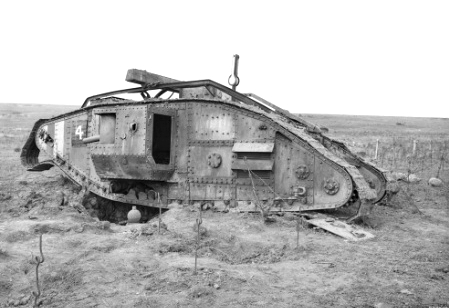
British Mk V tank disabled by anti-tank mine, Ronssoy October 3, 1918. Unexploded bombs are visible

In Spring 1918 many of these obsolescent bombs were buried on the Western Front under metal plates as anti-tank mines in expectation of attack by German tanks. This led to some later confusion as to whether unearthed bombs were unexploded mortar projectiles ("duds") or undetonated mines.

These minefields were inadequately documented. This caused the British problems in the closing months of the war when they had to advance again over territory they had previously abandoned and also prevented full clearance of the minefields after the war. This led to some French farmers being blown up in the 1930s when they started using tractors e.g. around Gouzeaucourt.

== See also ==
- List of heavy mortars

=== Weapons of comparable role, performance and era ===
- Mortier de 58 mm type 2 French equivalent

== Image gallery ==
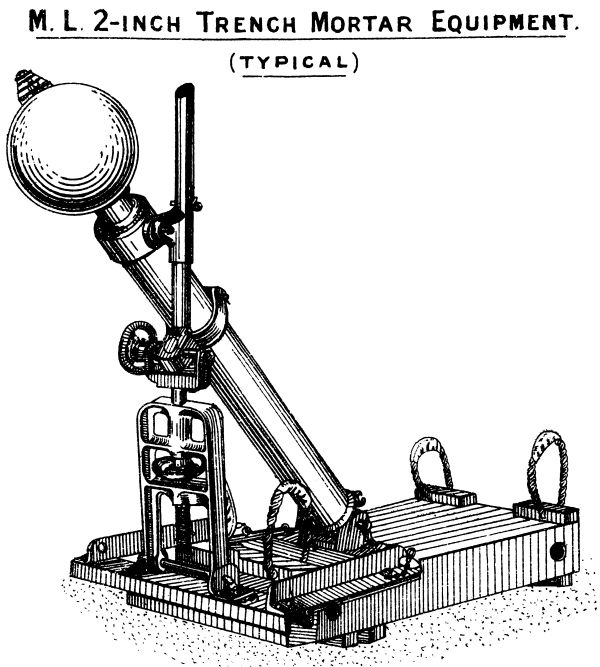
Diagram showing loaded mortar

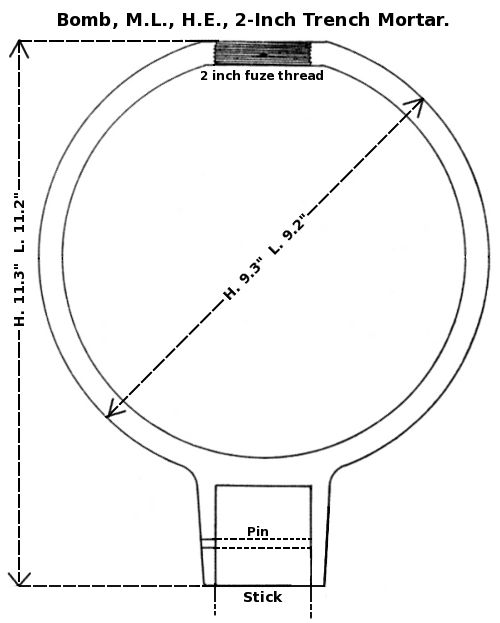
Diagram showing bomb dimensions

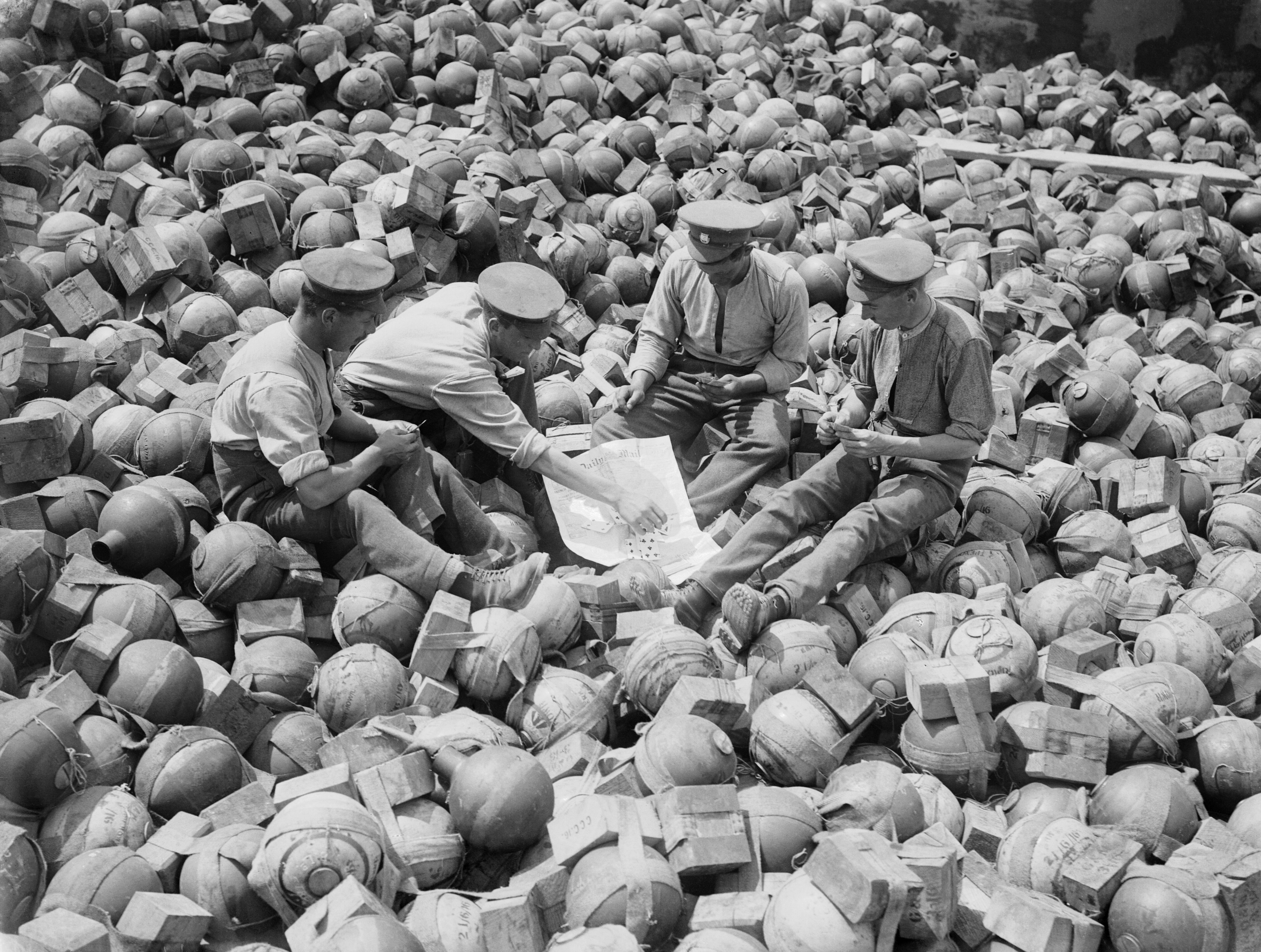
Royal Army Ordnance Corps men playing cards on bomb dump, Acheux, July 1916, Battle of the Somme. Sticks not yet attached. Wooden retaining blocks are attached to bombs

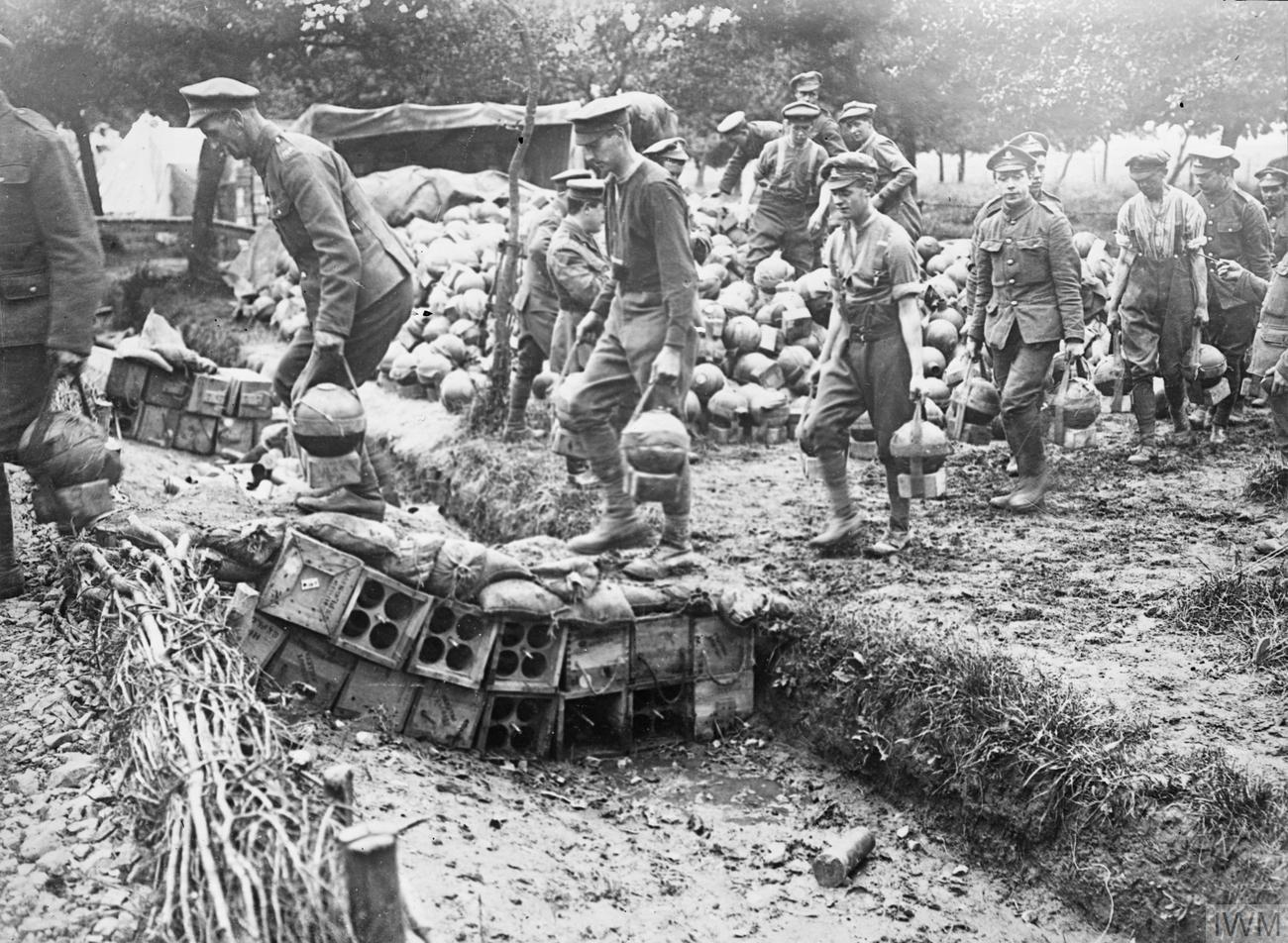
Men carrying mortar bombs by their attached carrying straps

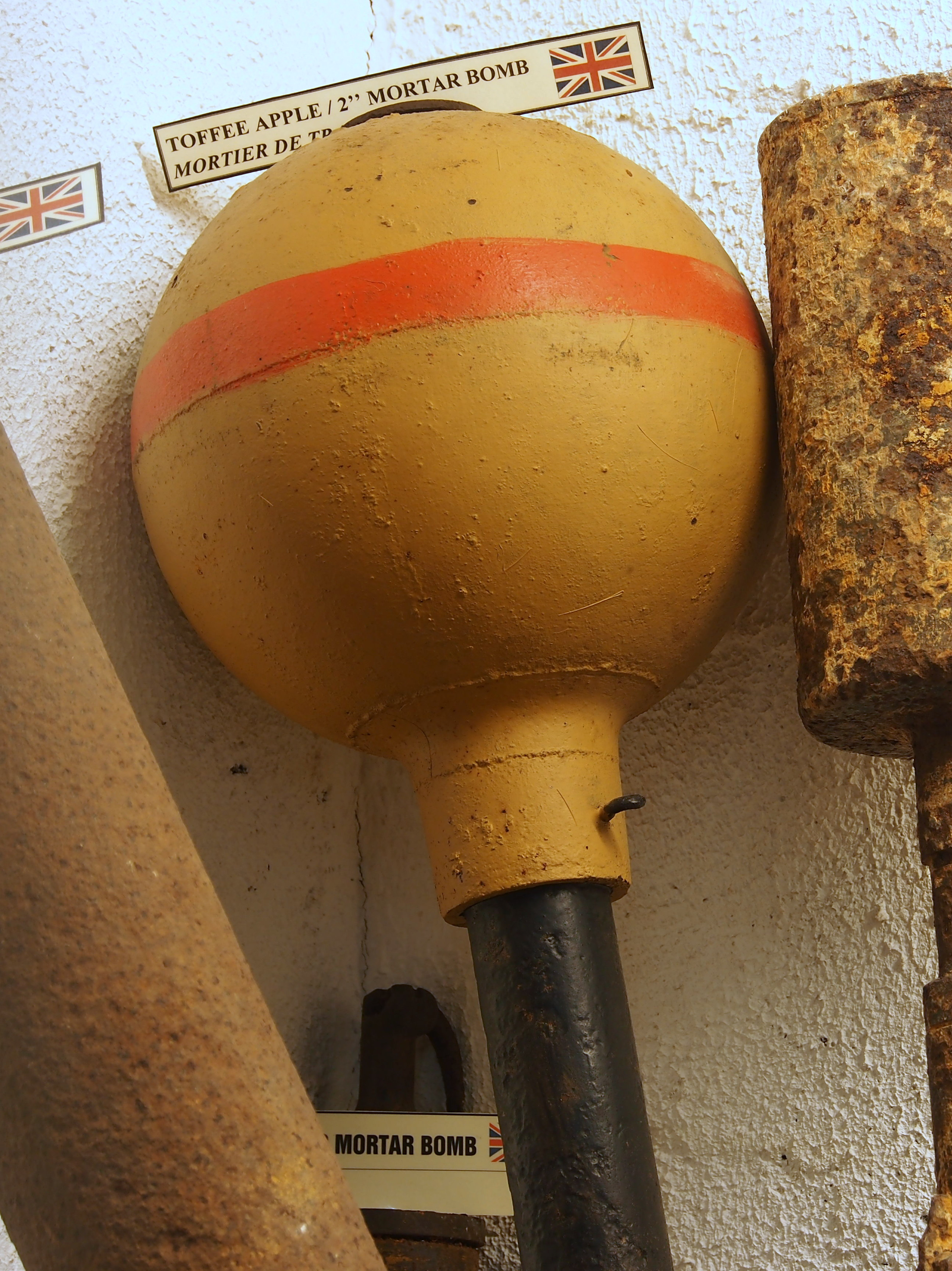
"Toffee Apple" mortar bomb

== Bibliography ==
- Handbook of the M.L. 2-inch trench mortar, Mark I: land service. War Office, United Kingdom, 1917.
- "History of the Ministry of Munitions", 1922. Volume XI, Part I Trench Warfare Supplies. Facsimile reprint by Imperial War Museum and Naval & Military Press, 2008 ISBN 1-84734-885-8
- Appendix D. Details of Trench Mortars. in Field Artillery Notes No. 7. US Army War College August 1917. Provided online by Combined Arms Research Library
- Appendix E. Details of Ammunition. in Field Artillery Notes No. 7. US Army War College August 1917. Provided online by Combined Arms Research Library
- "Artillery in Offensive Operations" GHQ Artillery Notes No. 4 January/February 1917. Redistributed by US Army War College August 1917. Provided online by Combined Arms Research Library
- "2nd Battalion South Wales Borderers". War Diaries (Part III - Gallipoli and Dardanelles), 1914-1916. images 1 to 181, March 1915 to February 1916, archive reference WO 95/4311 – via Ancestry.
- Dale Clarke, British Artillery 1914-1919. Field Army Artillery. Osprey Publishing, Oxford UK, 2004 ISBN 1-84176-688-7
- Simon Jones, World War I Gas Warfare Tactics and Equipment. Osprey Publishing, Oxford, 2007 ISBN 978-1-84603-151-9
- Lt. Colonel E.R. Pratt O.B.E. M.C., "The Origin of a Fuse", 1965.
- WL Ruffell, The 2-inch Howitzer
