= 58 mm trench mortar =

Mortier de 58 mm type 1
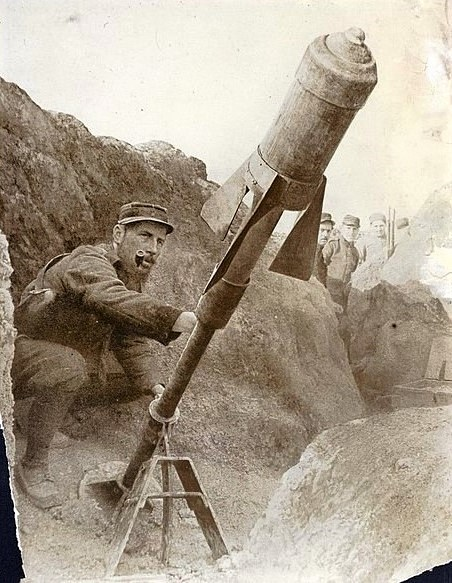
- Type: Medium trench mortar
- Place of origin: France

Service history
- In service: 1915–1916
- Used by: France
- Wars: World War I

Production history
- Designer: Commandant du Génie Duchêne; Général de Brigade Jean Dumézil
- Designed: 1914
- Manufacturer: Manufacture d'armes de Saint-Étienne
- No. built: 180

Specifications
- Mass: 114 kg (251 lb)
- Crew: 5
- Shell weight: 16 kg (35 lb)
- Caliber: 58.3 mm (2.3 in) (barrel only)
- Recoil: None
- Elevation: +45° to +80°
- Traverse: None
- Rate of fire: 1 rpm
- Muzzle velocity: 55 m/s (180 ft/s)
- Maximum firing range: 350 m (380 yd) at +45°
- Filling: Melinite
- Filling weight: 6 kg (13 lb)
- Detonation mechanism: Contact fuze

The 58 mm trench mortar was a series of French weapons. Type 1 (French: Mortier de 58 T Nᵒ1), sometimes referred to as Lance Torpilles, was a transitional mortar built in small numbers and used in World War I. Type 1b was used by both the French Army and Italian Army during the First World War. Type 2, also known as the Crapouillot or "little toad" from its appearance, was the standard French medium trench mortar of World War I.

== Background ==
The majority of military planners before the First World War were wedded to the concept of fighting an offensive war of rapid maneuver which before mechanization meant a focus on cavalry and light horse artillery firing shrapnel shells at formations of troops in the open. The problem facing the combatants was that their light field guns were designed for direct fire and only had limited angles of elevation and weren't capable of providing the high-angle indirect fire needed to deal with enemy troops in dug-in positions.

The simple expedient was to elevate the guns by having them fire from pits but the size and weight of the guns were excessive and pack animals couldn't move the guns in the trenches or across the shell-pocked quagmire of no man's land. What the theorists hadn't foreseen was that land mines, trenches, barbed wire, and machine guns would rob them of mobility and as the Western Front stagnated into trench warfare the light field guns that the combatants went to war with began to show their limitations.

Often defenders would wait out a preparatory artillery bombardment in reinforced dugouts and once the bombardment had lifted they would man their trenches and machine-gun nests in anticipation of an enemy attack across no man's land. Barbed wire was often used to channel attackers away from vulnerable areas of the defender's trenches and funnel attackers into predefined kill zones where overlapping fields of machine-gun fire could be brought to bear or to hold attackers at a safe distance to call in defensive artillery fire. The machine-gun nests could be constructed of sandbags, timber, corrugated metal, and concrete with overhead protection. For infantry advancing across no man's land, all they may see is a small horizontal opening at waist level, with just the top of the gun shield showing. Attacking infantry would have to close on these positions while under fire and destroy them with rifle fire, grenades, and flamethrowers.

The problem for the French Army was they lacked light, portable, simple, and inexpensive firepower that could be brought with them to overcome enemy machine gun nests and wire entanglements. Early on they experimented with crossbows, catapults, and slingshots to propel hand grenades with limited success. Unlike the Germans the French lacked portable mortars like the 7.58 cm Minenwerfer, 17 cm mittlerer Minenwerfer or 25 cm schwere Minenwerfer. The mortars that the French did have the Obusier de 155 mm C modèle 1881 and Mortier de 220 mm modèle 1880 were siege artillery designed to arm France's forts that were much heavier than their opponents and not designed to be mobile.

== History ==
In 1914, Major Duchêne of the Engineers (of the 33rd Corps belonging to X Army) began experimenting with a simple improvised tube mortar made from discarded Canon de 75 mle 1897 cases at the end of a pole. He found he was able to build a simple high-explosive fragmentation projectile that could be used as an anti-personnel weapon and to clear barbed wire entanglements. On November 7, 1914, Commander Duchêne was sent to the Bourges pyrotechnics school by order of General Joseph Joffre to develop a mortar under the direction of General Dumézil, inspector of artillery studies and testing.

== Design ==
The basic specification was for a light, mobile, and inexpensive mortar which could fire a 10 kg (22 lb) projectile to a range of 200 m (220 yd) using a smokeless powder propellant charge. The requirement also specified a weapon that could be produced from non-strategic materials, using simple production methods and produced by companies not currently engaged in war work.

The launcher was a simple pole 58 mm (2.3 in) in diameter with a round weighted base at one end and a hollow cup that held the propellant charge at the other. An adjustable sleeve was attached to the pole that connected to a crescent-shaped elevation mechanism with holes for elevation. The elevation mechanism then fit into the center of an A-shaped bi-pod and elevation was set by pushing a bolt through the elevation hole. The 60 g (2.1 oz) propellant charge was then inserted in the muzzle and the projectile slid onto the end of the launch tube. The mortar was fired by pulling on a lanyard which was attached to a friction igniter embedded in the propellant.

The first 70 mortars were delivered in mid-January 1915 to troops in the Argonne region for testing. The tests were considered successful and General Joffre ordered another 110 mortars and the production of 4,000 projectiles a day. However, the tests revealed that the launcher was unstable and had a tendency to tip over when pulling on the firing lanyard. The launcher often fell over after being fired and had to be re-aimed between shots which limited its rate of fire. The troops also requested heavier projectiles with larger explosive charges to deal with enemy troops in dug-in positions and these factors led to the type 1 being replaced in 1916.

== Type 1b and type 2 ==
Mortier de 58 mm type 1b
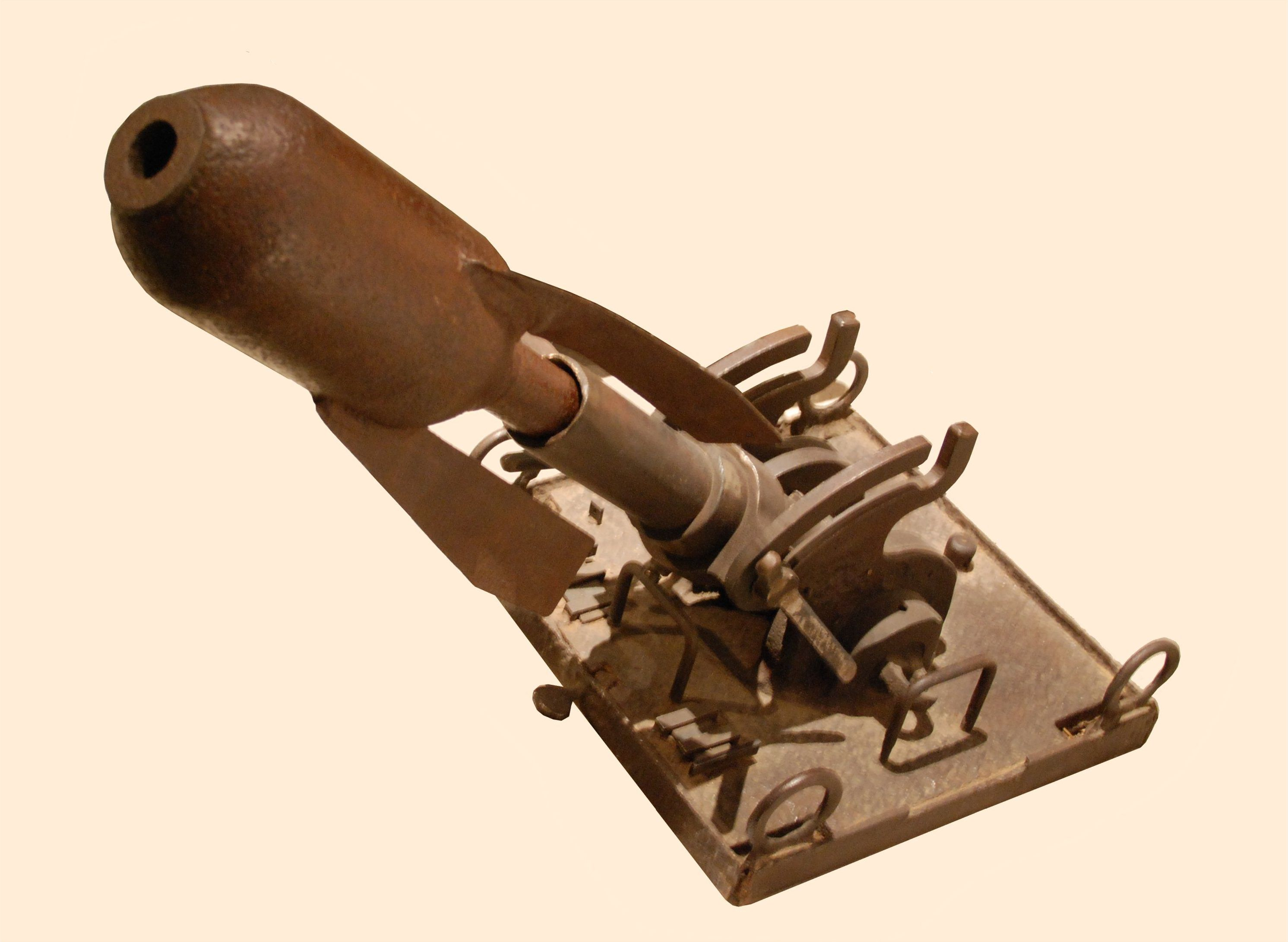
- Mortier de 58 mm type 1b at the Verdun Memorial, Fleury-devant-Douaumont, France
- Type: Medium trench mortar
- Place of origin: France

Service history
- In service: 1915–1916
- Used by: France; Kingdom of Italy
- Wars: World War I

Production history
- Designer: Commandant du Génie Duchêne; Général de Brigade Jean Dumézil
- Designed: 1914-1915
- Manufacturer: Manufacture d'armes de Saint-Étienne
- No. built: 1,700

Specifications
- Mass: 181 kg (399 lb)
- Length: 550 mm (1 ft 10 in)
- Crew: 5
- Shell: Separate loading bagged charge and projectile
- Shell weight: 16 kg (35 lb)
- Calibre: 58.3 mm (2.3 in) (barrel only)
- Recoil: None
- Elevation: +45° to +80°
- Traverse: 60°
- Rate of fire: 1 rpm
- Muzzle velocity: 65–73 m/s (210–240 ft/s)
- Maximum firing range: 450 m (490 yd) at +45°
- Filling: Melinite
- Filling weight: 6 kg (13 lb)
- Detonation mechanism: Contact fuze

Mortier de 58 mm type 2
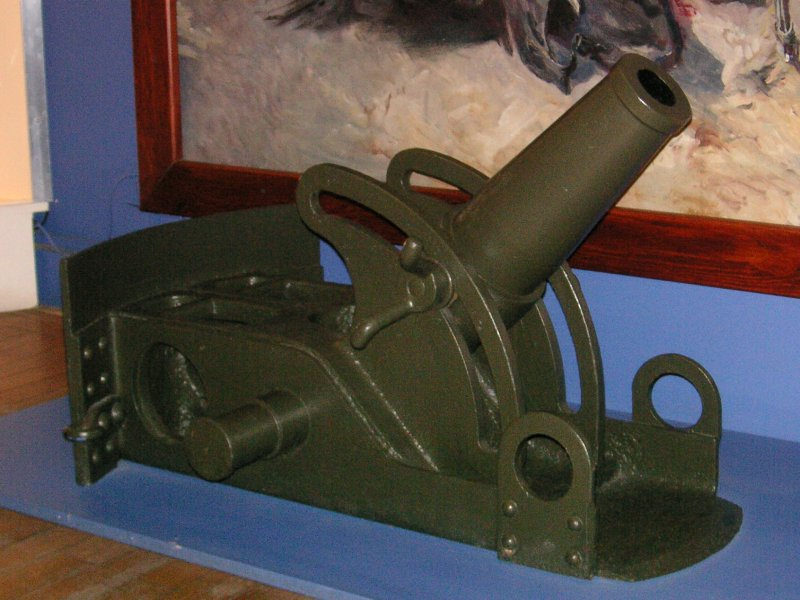
- Type: Medium trench mortar
- Place of origin: France

Service history
- In service: 1909-1940
- Used by: France; Kingdom of Italy; Poland; Romania; Serbia; United States
- Wars: World War I

Production history
- Designer: Commandant du Génie Duchêne; Général de Brigade Jean Dumézil
- Designed: 1909
- Manufacturer: Saint Etienne

Specifications
- Mass: Barrel & Breech: 75 kg (165 lb); Carriage: 226 kg (498 lb)
- Crew: 5
- Shell: 18 kg (40 lb) (LS); 20 kg (44 lb) (ALS); 35 kg (77 lb) (DLS)
- Caliber: 58.3 mm (2.3 in) (barrel only)
- Elevation: +45° to +82.5°
- Maximum firing range: 1,250 m (1,370 yd) (LS); 1,450 m (1,590 yd) (ALS); 670 m (730 yd) (DLS)
- Filling weight: 5.35 kg (11 lb 13 oz) (LS); 6.4 kg (14 lb 2 oz) (ALS); 10 kg (22 lb 1 oz) (DLS)

To address deficiencies in the design of the Mortier de 58 mm type 1, Major Duchêne continued to work on the design of two new mortars concurrently with completely different bases. Where the type 1 was tall, thin, and top-heavy, the type 1b and type 2 launchers were short, had a broad footprint, and low center of gravity. The long launch tube wasn't needed to elevate the projectiles past the lip of the trench so a shorter and sturdier launch tube was used instead. Both designs were much more stable which led to a higher rate of fire because they didn't need as much setup time between shots. Their short and fat appearance earned them the nickname "little toads".

The type 1b was lighter - 181 kg (399 lb) - and could fire the same projectiles as the type 1 to 450 m (490 yd) at +45°. The mortar consisted of a square metal baseplate with four hoops at the corners that two wooden poles slid through so the crew to carry the assembled mortar. There was a short smoothbore barrel that sat on a circular metal swivel that could be adjusted for both traverse and elevation. Once traverse and elevation were set there were handles to lock the swivel in place. The 37–57 g (1–2 oz) propellant charge was then inserted in the muzzle and the projectile slid onto the end of the barrel. The mortar was fired by pulling on a lanyard which was attached to a friction igniter embedded in the propellant.

The projectiles were considered too light and the type 1b was in turn replaced by the type 2. The advantage of the type 2 was that it could fire new heavier projectiles of similar design to a greater range, but a disadvantage was that it weighed 410 kg (900 lb) so it wasn't as mobile. It was still light enough that it could be lifted by the crew and placed on a cart and towed by pack animals. The type 2 became one of the most widely used French mortars of the First World War with 276 operational in June 1915; 779 in March 1916; 1,268 in May 1917; 1,766 in January 1918; and 1,158 in November 1918.

Both the Mortier de 58 T N°2 and Mortier de 58 T N°1 bis were used by the Italian Army who gave the Mortier de 58 T N°2 the designation Bombarda da 58 A and the Mortier de 58 T N°1 bis was designated Bombarda da 58 B. Approximately 1,000 of both types were used by the Italian Army.

=== Type 2 projectiles ===
3 types of bomb were available:

- Light L.S. bomb - 18 kg (40 lb), containing 5.35 kg (11.8 lb) of explosive. 6 wings, hollow plugged tail.
- Heavy D.L.S. bomb - 35 kg (77 lb), containing 10 kg (22 lb) of explosive. 6 wings, hollow plugged tail.
- Medium A.L.S bomb - 20 kg (44 lb), containing 6.4 kg (14 lb) of explosive. 3 wings, unlike the other 2 it has a hollow tail which contained the propellant charge, placing thrust closer to center of gravity and increasing range and accuracy. Not yet in common use as at March 1918.

Examples of capabilities:

- To destroy a 3 m (3.3 yd) x 3 m (3.3 yd) blockhouse, 60-80 D.L.S. bombs or 100-150 L.S. bombs were required.
- To cut a passage through barbed wire defenses 40 m (44 yd) wide x 30 m (33 yd) deep, 120 D.L.S. bombs or 200 L.S. bombs were required.

== Gallery ==
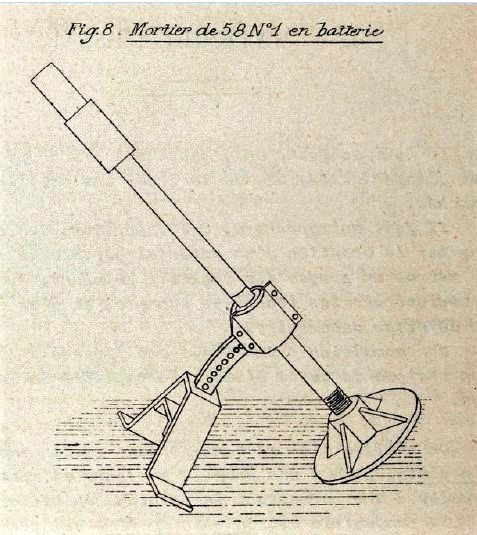
Diagram of the type 1 launcher

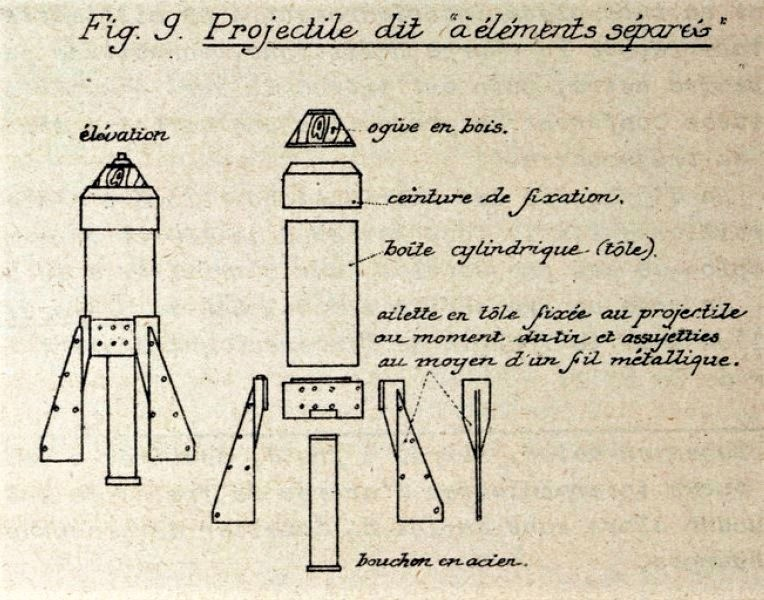
Diagram of the projectile

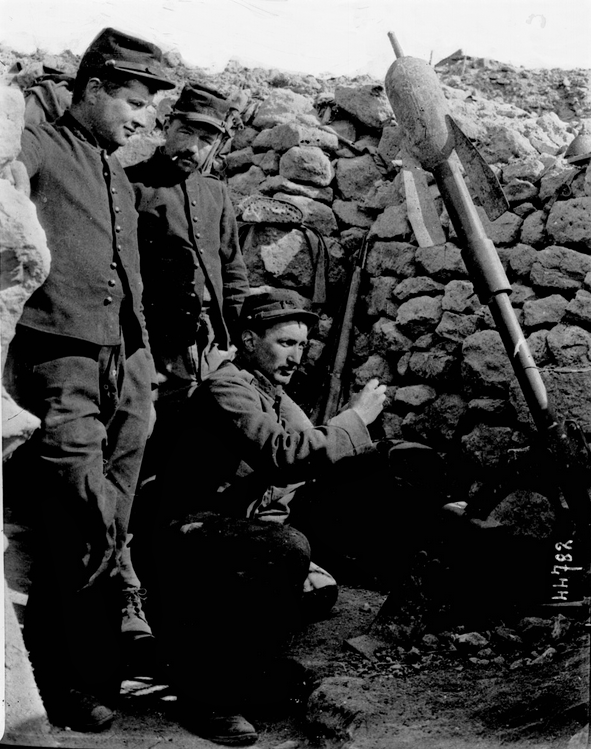
A Mortier de 58 mm type 1 near Vauquois, France, 1915

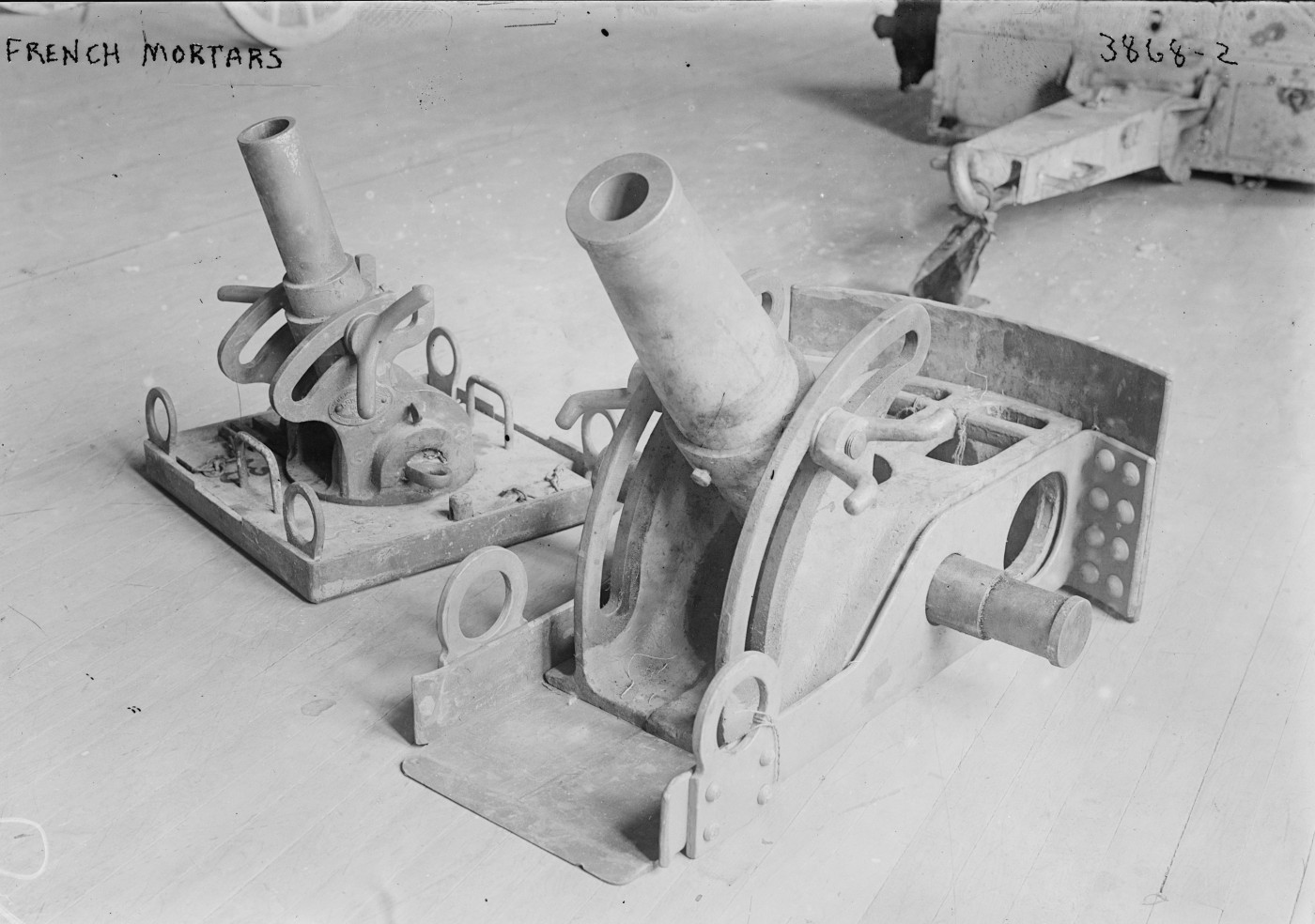
The type 1b is to the left and the later type 2 is to the right.

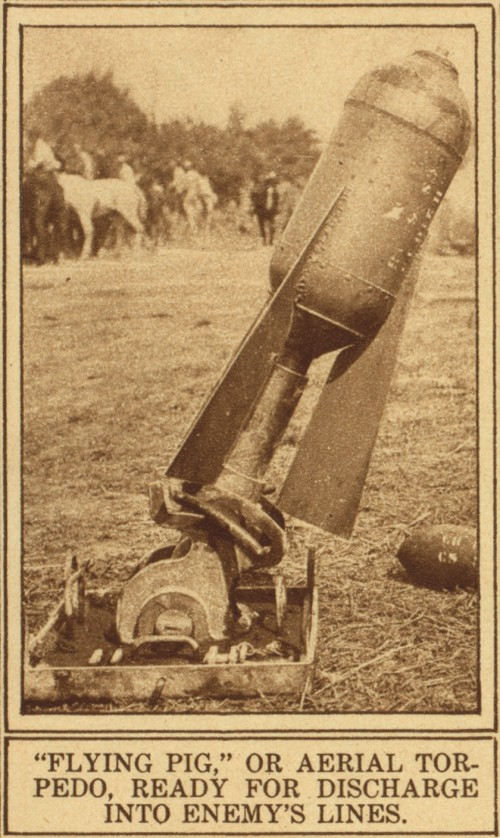
A loaded type 1b

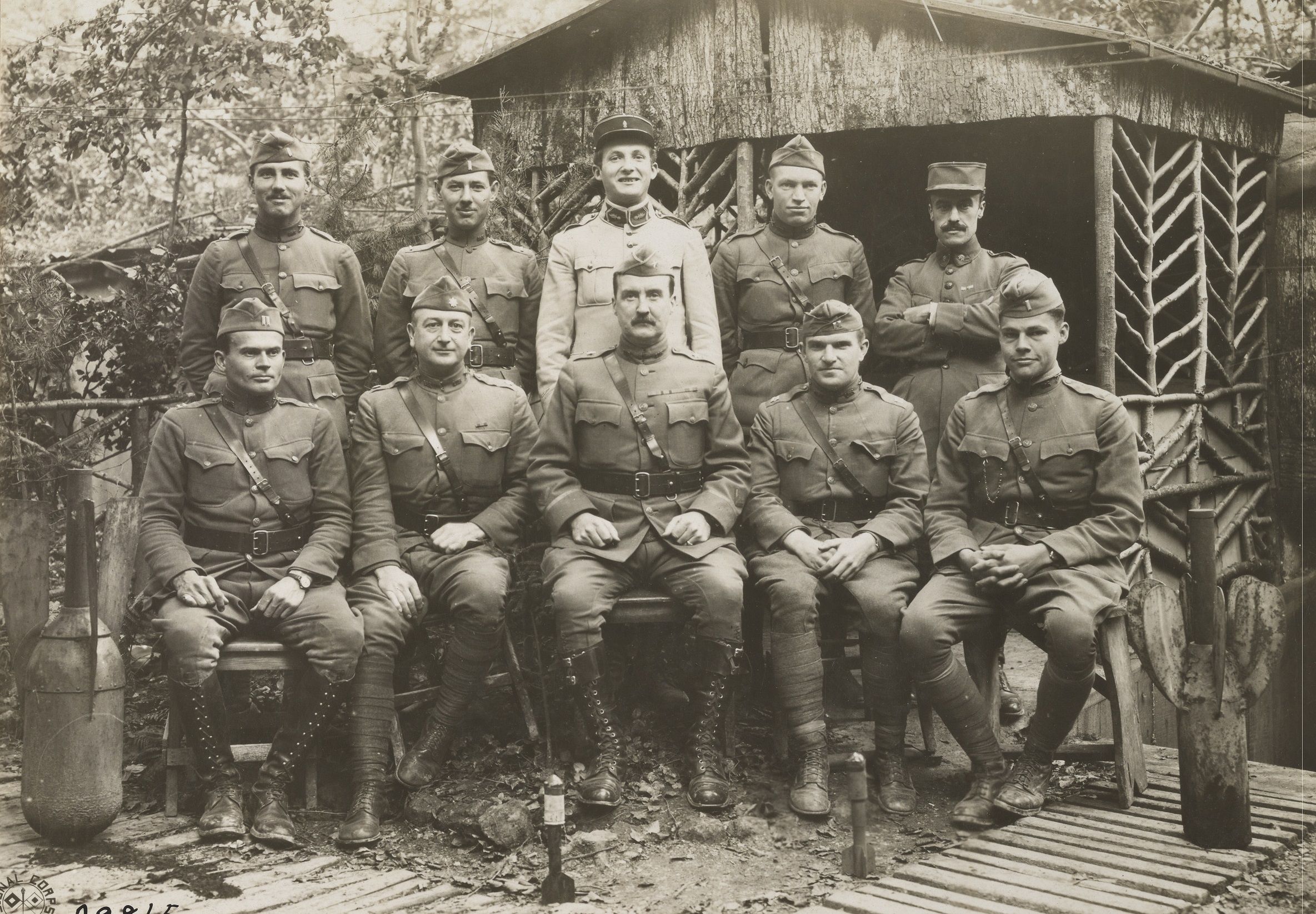
A group of Allied officers. A three-finned type 1b is to the left and a six-finned type 2 is to the right.

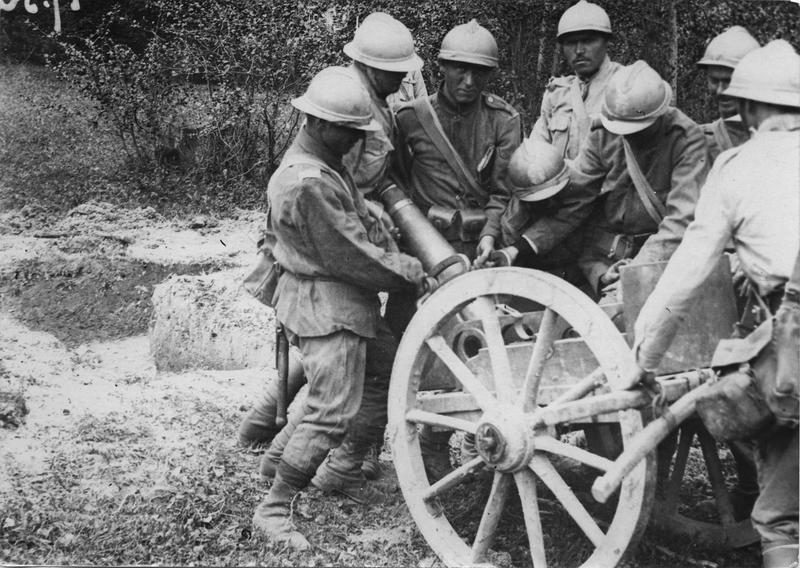
A mortar being unloaded from its wagon.

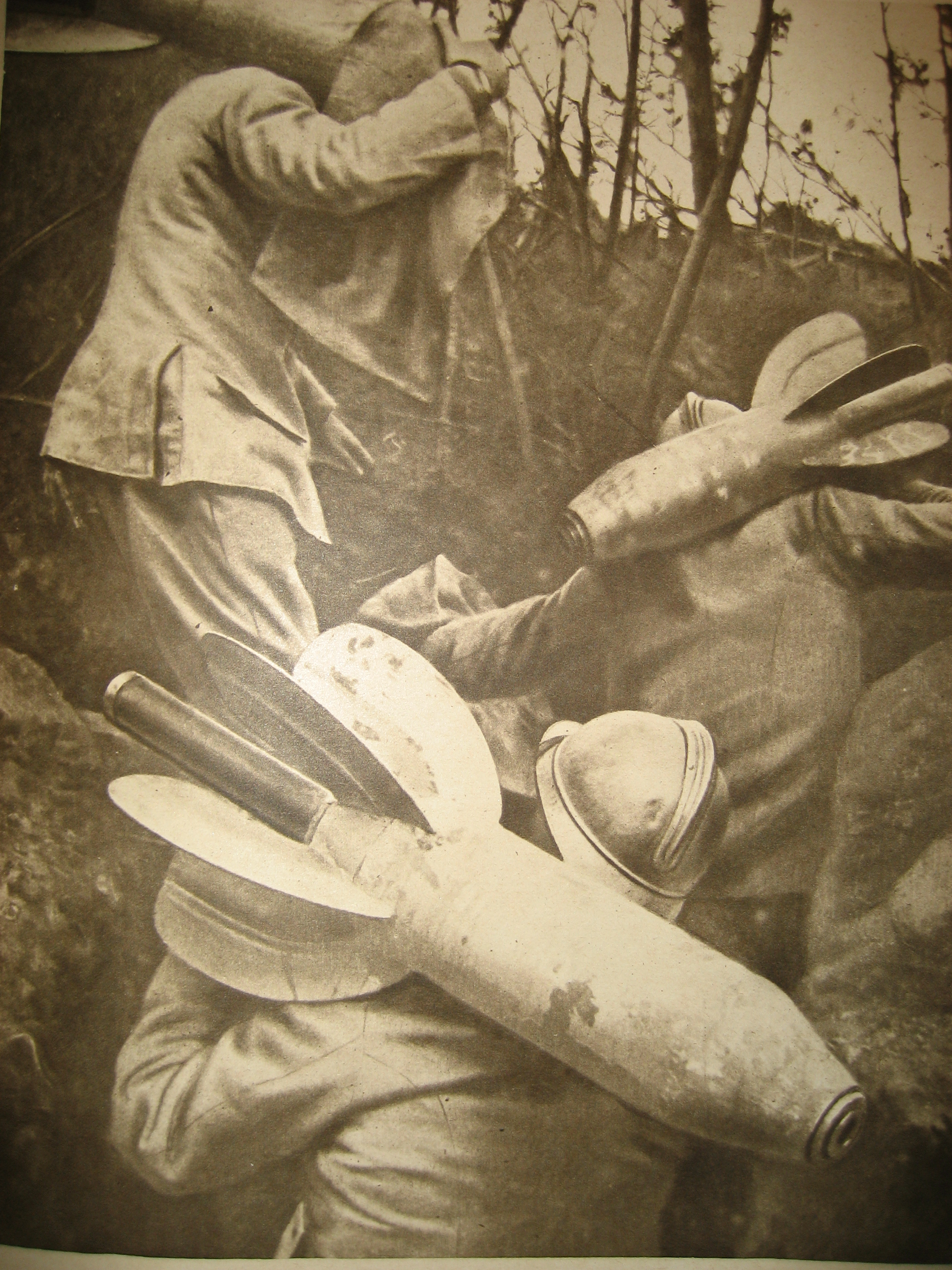
Carrying bombs in a trench.

== Surviving examples ==
- Many places around France, especially as war memorials.
- At the Polish Army Museum in Warsaw.

== Weapons of comparable role, performance and era ==
- 2 inch Medium Mortar - Early British equivalent
- Newton 6 inch Mortar - Later British equivalent
