= Canon de 240 TR Mle 1903 =

Canon de 240 TR Mle 1903 sur affût-truck Mle 1914
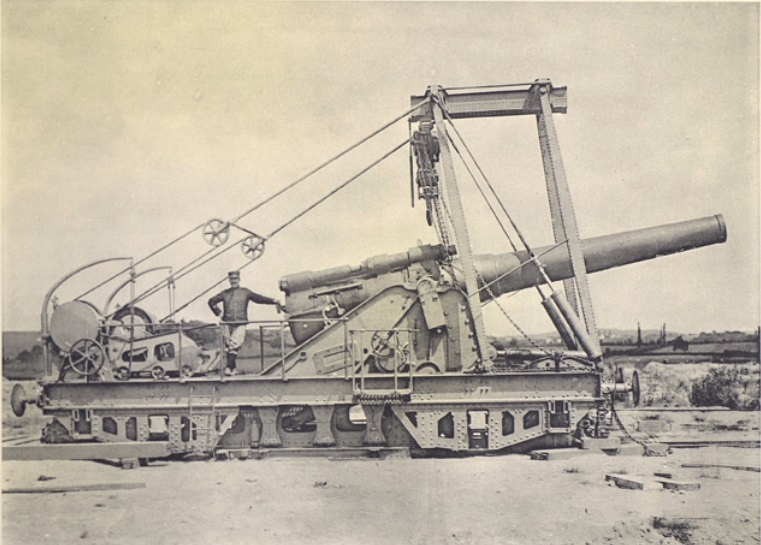
- Type: Railway gun Siege gun
- Place of origin: France

Service history
- Used by: France
- Wars: World War I

Production history
- Designer: Canet
- Manufacturer: Gun: Schneider; Carriage: St Chamond
- Produced: 1914
- No. built: 16

Specifications
- Mass: Total: 47.8 t (47.0 long tons; 52.7 short tons); Gun: 17.8 t (17.5 long tons; 19.6 short tons)
- Length: 6.47 m (21 ft 3 in)
- Barrel length: 4.9 m (16 ft 1 in) L/20.6
- Shell: Separate loading cased charge and projectile.
- Shell weight: Cartridge: 53 lb (24 kg); Projectile: 140 kg (310 lb)
- Caliber: 240 mm (9.4 in)
- Breech: Canet breech
- Recoil: Hydro-gravity double recoil system
- Elevation: +15° to +40°
- Traverse: 7° left/right
- Muzzle velocity: 526 m/s (1,730 ft/s)
- Maximum firing range: 17.3 km (10.7 mi)

The Canon de 240 TR Mle 1903 sur affût-truck Mle 1914 was a French railway gun and siege gun used by the French Army during World War I.

== History ==
Before the First World War, the doctrine of the French Army was geared towards a war of rapid maneuver. Although the majority of combatants had heavy field artillery prior to the outbreak of the First World War, none had adequate numbers of heavy guns in service and once the Western Front stagnated and trench warfare set in the light field guns that the combatants went to war with were beginning to show their limitations when facing an enemy who was now dug into prepared positions. Indirect fire, interdiction and counter-battery fire emphasized the importance of long-range heavy artillery. Since aircraft of the period were not yet capable of carrying large diameter bombs the burden of delivering heavy firepower fell on the artillery. Two sources of heavy artillery suitable for conversion to field use were surplus coastal defense guns and naval guns.

However, a paradox faced artillery designers of the time; while large caliber naval guns were common, large caliber land weapons were not due to their weight, complexity, and lack of mobility. Large caliber field guns often required extensive site preparation because the guns had to be broken down into multiple loads light enough to be towed by a horse team or the few traction engines of the time and then reassembled before use. Building a new gun could address the problem of disassembling, transporting and reassembling a large gun, but it did not necessarily address how to convert existing heavy weapons to make them more mobile. Rail transport proved to be the most practical solution because the problems of heavy weight, lack of mobility and reduced setup time were addressed.

== Design ==
- Gun - The Canon de 240 TR Mle 1903 sur affût-truck Mle 1914 was designed by Canet and manufactured by Schneider. It started life as a coastal defense gun called the Canon de 240 TR Mle 1884-1903 sur affût G Mle 1903. It was a typical built-up gun of the period made from steel with a rifled inner tube and reinforced by layers of external tubes.
- Breech - The gun fired separate loading cased charges and projectiles in which bags of propellant were placed inside a brass case to vary range and velocity. The shell casing together with the breech provided obturation to seal the breech during firing. Since the cases could be filled with bags of propellant ahead of time and loaded more quickly than guns using only bagged propellant it was considered a rapid-fire gun and the "TR" in its name stood for tir rapide or rapid-fire in English. The guns had a Canet rotating block breech that was a bit unusual as seen here on a Canet 155 mm (6.1 in) gun. The breech was semicircular in shape and was hinged at its center. When the breech was opened the projectile and casing were fed in and then the breech block was rotated 90° upward to seal the breech. When the gun fired the breech was opened, the case was ejected and the next round inserted.
- Recoil System - The recoil system for the gun consisted of a U-shaped gun cradle which held the trunnioned barrel and a slightly inclined firing platform with a hydro-gravity recoil system. When the gun fired the hydraulic buffers on top and at the front of the cradle slowed the recoil of the cradle which slid up a set of inclined rails on the firing platform and then returned the gun to position by the combined action of the buffers and gravity.
- Rail Carriage - Rather than being a true railway gun it was more of a multi-mode siege gun because the carriage built by St Chamond could be reconfigured to run on standard gauge rails, narrow gauge rails or fitted with road wheels like the Mortier de 293 Danois sur affut-truck modèle 1914 which was similar in construction and configuration. In the center of the carriage, there were the two standard gauge 4-wheeled railroad bogies that could be raised or lowered. There was also a narrow gauge 4-wheeled bogie at both ends that could also be raised and lowered. Lastly, jackscrews are provided on the car body for transferring from one set of trucks to the other. Road wheels could be substituted for the narrow-gauge trucks and the carriage could be towed by a traction engine. At the front of the carriage, there was a shear leg derrick that could be used to load and unload the gun for transport. The normal procedure was to transport the barrel and base on their own carriages on standard gauge rails until near the front and then transport both on narrow gauge rails or road wheels to the front. Site preparation consisted of creating a level piece of ground by laying a bed of stones and timbers then lowering the carriage onto the base plate. The base plate is prevented from moving by two anchors buried in front of the mount. The gun is then reassembled on the base plate and made ready for action.
- Traverse and Elevation - The carriage employed a car traversing or berceau system where the car and trucks were placed on a base plate and could be traversed 7° left/right of the center line. The base plate is arranged with a pintle in front and the car has two rollers behind. At the rear of the rail carriage, there was a shell hoist and there was also a small cart which ran on rails to the breech for ammunition handling. The gun was loaded at +10° and could be elevated to a maximum of +40°.
- Pros and Cons - Although adaptable the gun required considerable setup time.

== World War I ==
The Canon de 240 TR Mle 1903 was assigned to units of the ALGP (artillerie lourde à grande puissance) during World War I. At first, they were organized in 4 groups of 2 batteries of 2 guns per battery. Later the guns were reorganized into 2 groups 1 with 3 batteries and 2 with 2 batteries of 3 guns with 1 spare. When the war ended there were 8 guns left in service.

== Gallery ==
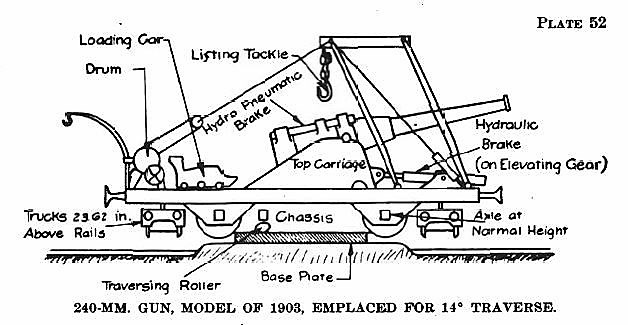
A schematic of the major gun components.

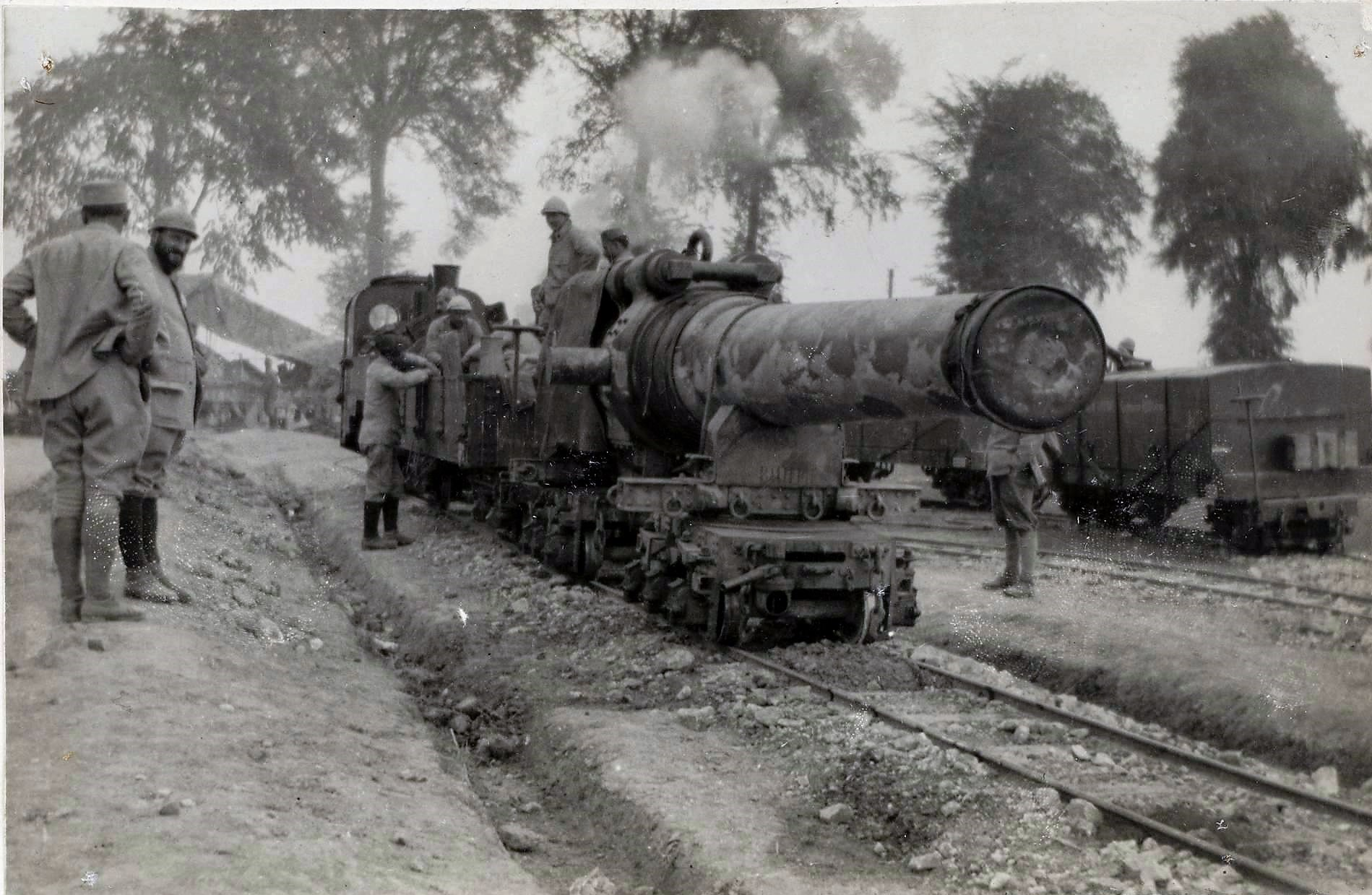
A barrel removed for transport on narrow gauge rails.

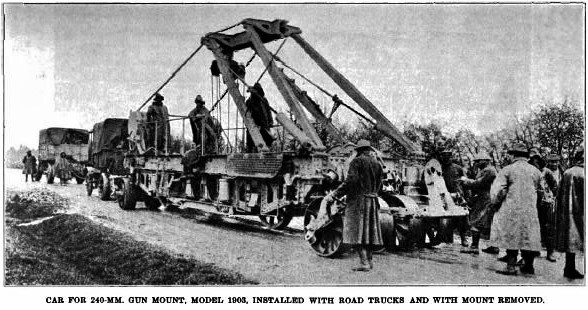
A carriage placed on road wheels without gun.

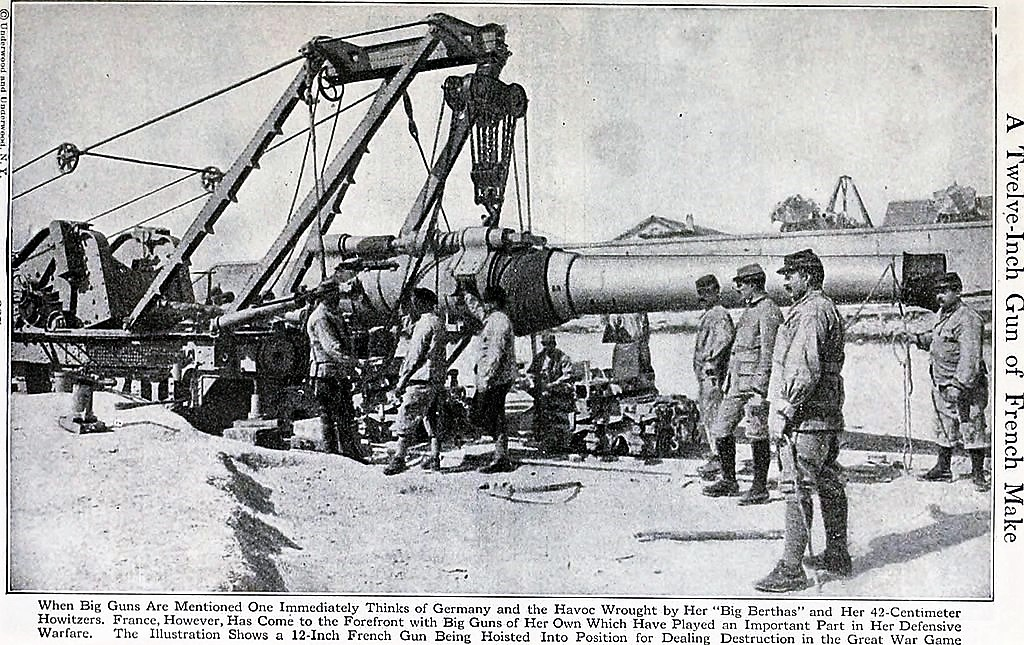
Reassembling a gun onsite.

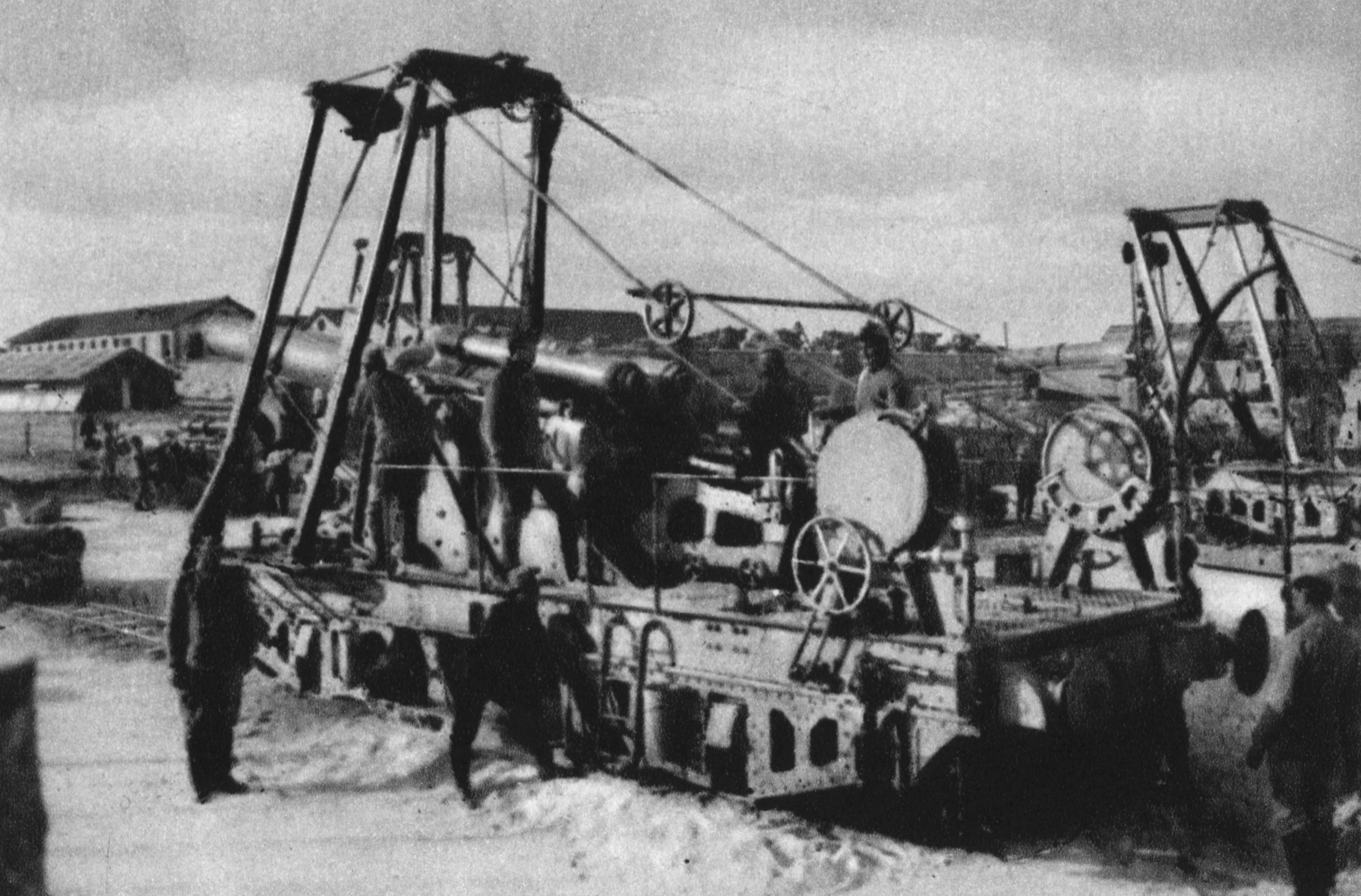
An assembled gun on wide gauge rails.

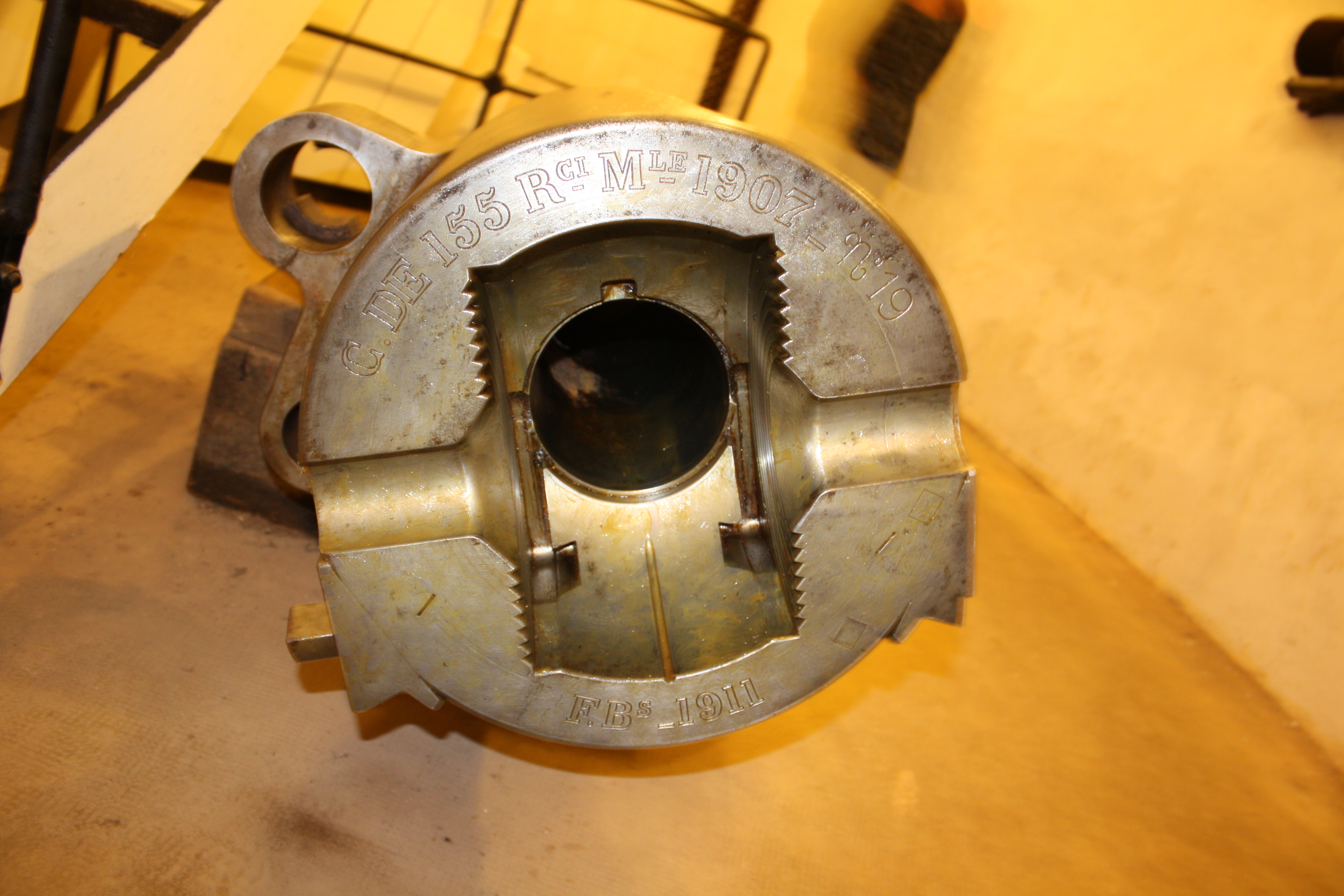
The breech mechanism as used on a 155 mm gun.
