= 20 cm Luftminenwerfer M 16 =

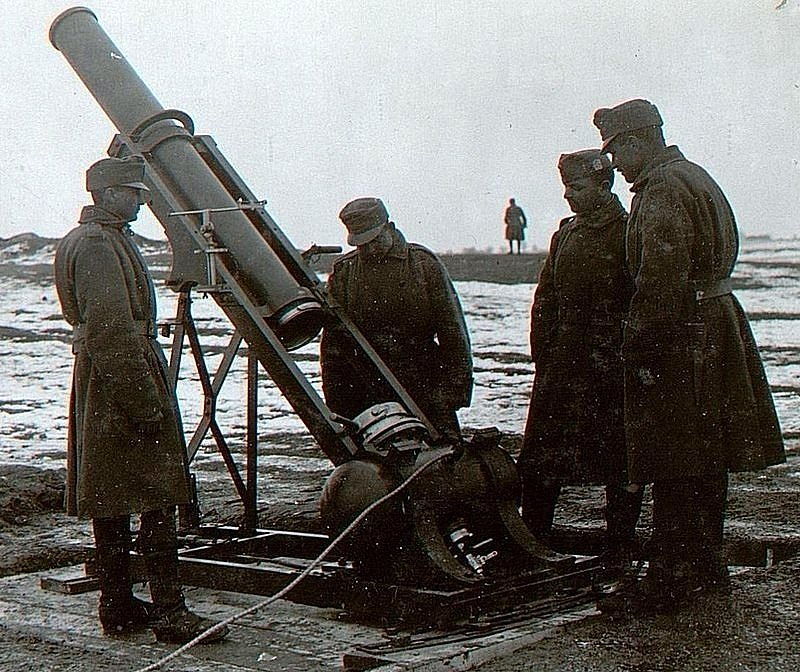
- Type: Heavy trench mortar
- Place of origin: Austria-Hungary

Service history
- In service: 1916–1918
- Used by: Austria-Hungary
- Wars: World War I

Production history
- Designer: Austria Metal Works
- Designed: 1915-6
- Manufacturer: Austria Metal Works
- Produced: 1916-7
- No. built: 100

Specifications
- Mass: 690 kg (1,520 lb)
- Crew: 5
- Shell: 22.6 kg (50 lb) or 34.4 kg (76 lb)
- Caliber: 200 millimetres (7.9 in)
- Elevation: fixed at 45°
- Traverse: 0°
- Maximum firing range: 1,250 m (1,370 yd)

The 20 cm Luftminenwerfer M 16 (Pneumatic trench mortar) was a heavy mortar used by Austria-Hungary in World War I. It was developed by Austria Metal Works in Brno from their earlier 12 cm Luftminenwerfer M 16. It was a rigid-recoil, smoothbore, breech-loading design that had to be levered around to aim at new targets. It was very simple in that the shell closed the top of the chamber and was retained by a "gripper" until the air pressure was deemed sufficient and the gripper was manually released, which fired the weapon. The barrel was fixed at 45° elevation and range was adjusted by varying the air pressure, but an additional barrel could be fitted to extend the range. A single cylinder of compressed air was only good for four to six shots. It was loaded onto a two-wheel cart for transport.

20 were ordered at the end of May 1916 after trials in the spring. Another 80 were ordered in November 1916. In service it was not as successful as its smaller brother due to its greater weight and much greater requirement for compressed air. It was superseded by the 26 cm Minenwerfer M 17.

== Bibliography ==
- Ortner, M. Christian. The Austro-Hungarian Artillery From 1867 to 1918: Technology, Organization, and Tactics. Vienna, Verlag Militaria, 2007 ISBN 978-3-902526-13-7
