= Newton 6-inch mortar =

British mortar weapon

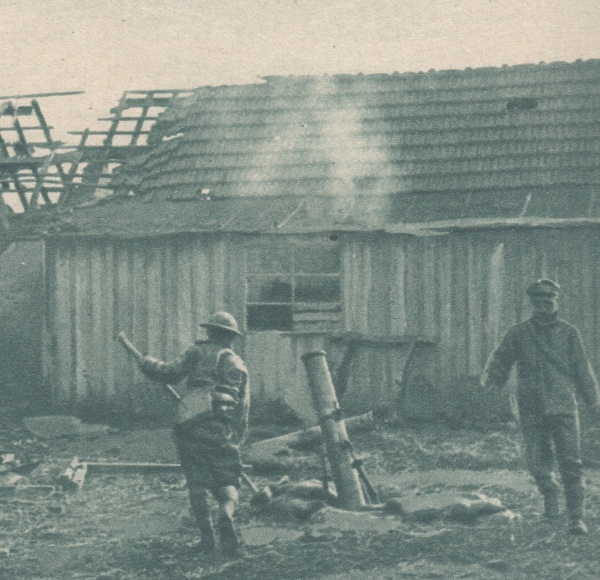
- Canadian troops firing the 6-inch (152.4 mm) mortar in the open at Valenciennes in 1918
- Type: Medium mortar
- Place of origin: United Kingdom

Service history
- In service: 1917–1918
- Used by: British Empire; United States
- Wars: World War I

Production history
- Designer: Captain H Newton, 5th Btn Sherwood Foresters
- Designed: 1916
- No. built: UK : 2,538

Specifications
- Barrel length: Bore: 4 ft 6 in (1.37 m); Total: 4 ft 9 in (1.45 m)
- Shell: HE 52 lb (24 kg)
- Calibre: 6 inches (152.4 mm)
- Elevation: 77°–45°
- Rate of fire: 8 rounds/min
- Effective firing range: 100 - 1,420 yds (91 - 1,298 m)
- Maximum firing range: 1,950 yd (1,780 m)
- Filling: Amatol, Ammonal or Sabulite
- Filling weight: 22 pounds (9.98 kg)

The Newton 6-inch mortar was the standard British medium mortar in World War I from early 1917 onwards.

== Description ==
The Newton 6-inch replaced the 2-inch medium mortar beginning in February 1917.

It was a simple smooth bore muzzle-loading mortar consisting of a 57-inch (1,448 mm) one-piece steel tube barrel, with a "striker stud" inside the centre of the closed base of the tube. The rounded external base of the tube sat in a socket in the flat cast steel base, which in turn sat on a wooden platform. An "elevating guy" (cable) connected to a loop in the upper side of the barrel and the rear end of the bed. "Traversing guys" (cables) connected to loops on each side of the barrel and eyebolts on the upper sides of the bed. Hence aiming of the barrel was done by adjusting the length of the guys via adjusting screws. A socket in the barrel base allowed for emergency firing via a "misfire plug" in the case of misfires (i.e. if the bomb remained in the barrel due to failure of the propellant to ignite).

== Combat service ==
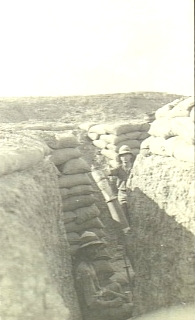
Loading bomb in a typical trench emplacement, Mesopotamia 1918

British Empire divisions were initially equipped with three batteries of four mortars designated X, Y and Z. From February 1918 onwards, these were consolidated into two batteries, X and Y, of six mortars each, and Z was dissolved. In British use, they were operated by the Royal Field Artillery and formed part of the divisional artillery, with one battery attached to each of the divisional artillery brigades.

The United States Army began production and equipping with this mortar late in the war but it is doubtful whether any were used in combat.

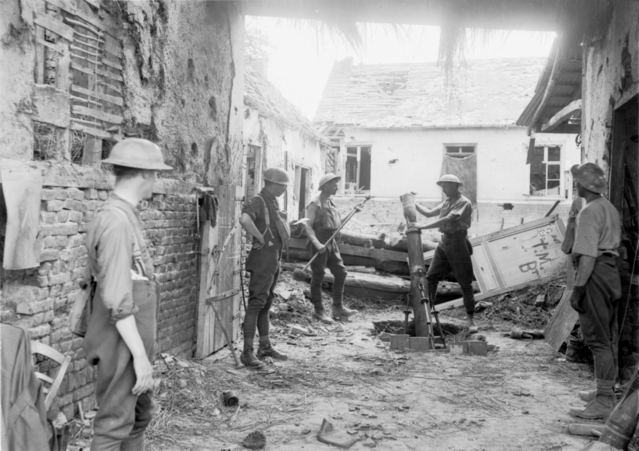
3rd Australian Medium Trench Mortar Battery in action, Ville-sur-Ancre, Somme, 29 May 1918

The mortar was operated from concealed pits close to the front line during trench warfare, and was used in the open during the final "mobile warfare" phase of the First World War, depending on available transport. The disassembled weapon was usually transported on horsedrawn carts but the Canadian Automobile Machine Gun Brigade (the Canadian Independent Force or "Brutinel's Brigade") is known to have successfully used the mortar both mounted on motor trucks and dismounted in the closing months of the war.

The 52-pound cast-iron fin-stabilised high explosive bomb carried the percussion primer at the base in the intersection of the four vanes (fins), consisting of a specially loaded blank .303 rifle cartridge. The basic propellant charges were contained in four small white cambric bags each containing 1 oz of guncotton yarn. These were held in place in the four angles between the bomb's fins. For ranges less than 1000 yards, one or more bags could be removed, as per range tables.

For ranges above 1,000 yards (910 m), additional charges were loaded before the bomb, held in two white cambric bags each containing 1 oz 4 drm of cordite.

In action the gunners would adjust the angle of the barrel via the elevating guy (for distance) and traversing guys (for direction). The manual warns: "See that the elevating and traversing screws of the guys are always tight. A slack guy leads to inaccurate shooting, and the stresses on firing are not equally distributed; this is usually the cause of the guys breaking".

The range tables specified the barrel angle and propellant charges required. The additional cordite propelling charge bags were dropped down the barrel if necessary, or necessary number of propellant charges removed from the bomb, and the bomb's fuze was set. The gunners stood back, the bomb was dropped down the barrel, the detonator in the base of the .303 cartridge in the base of the bomb struck a pin in the bottom of the barrel and fired, igniting the guncotton charges in the base of the bomb, which in turn ignited the cordite charges if present. The resulting rapid gas expansion propelled the bomb up the barrel and to its target.

== Image gallery ==
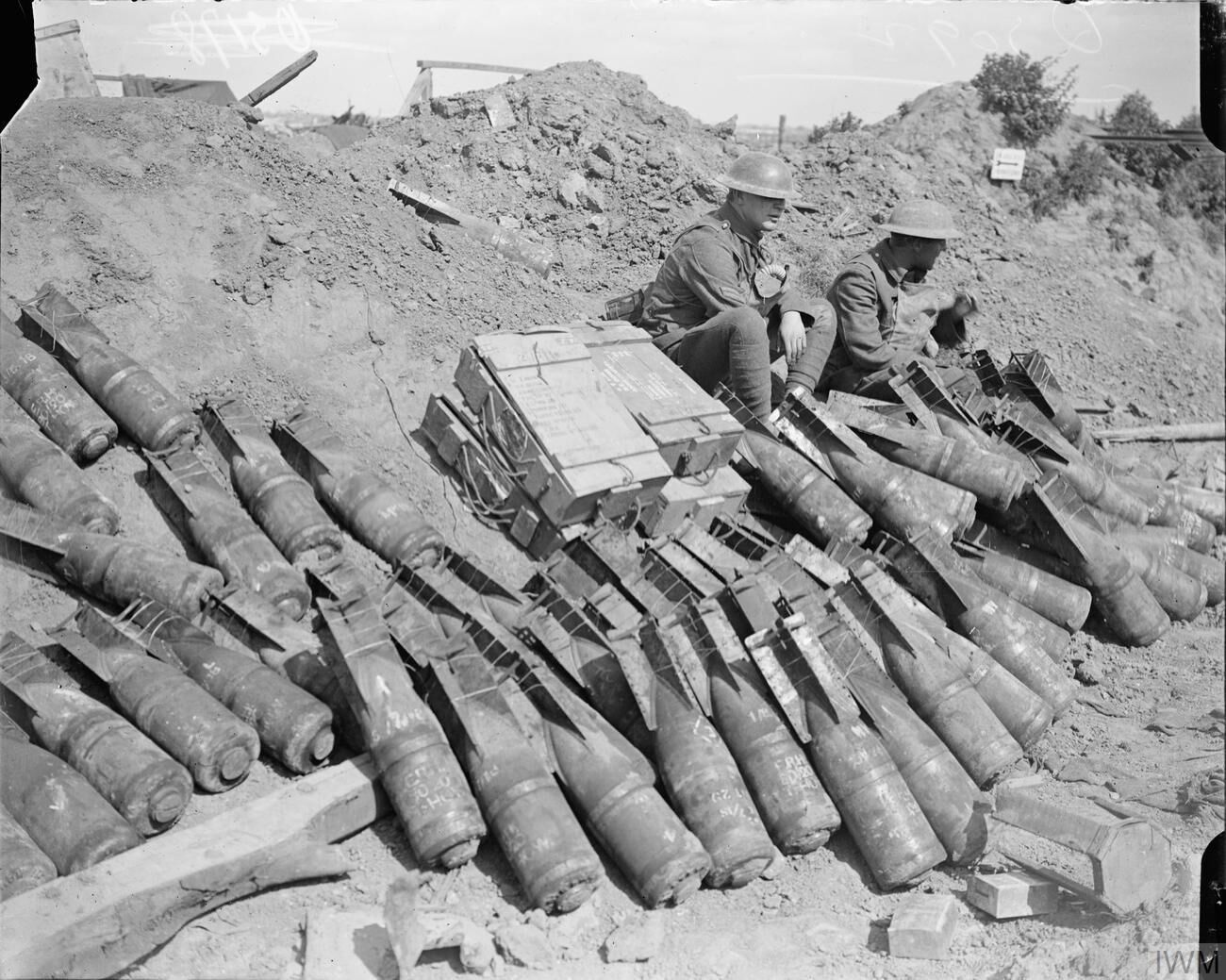
Men of the 9th Btn Royal Sussex Regiment and mortar bomb dump near Lens, September 3, 1918

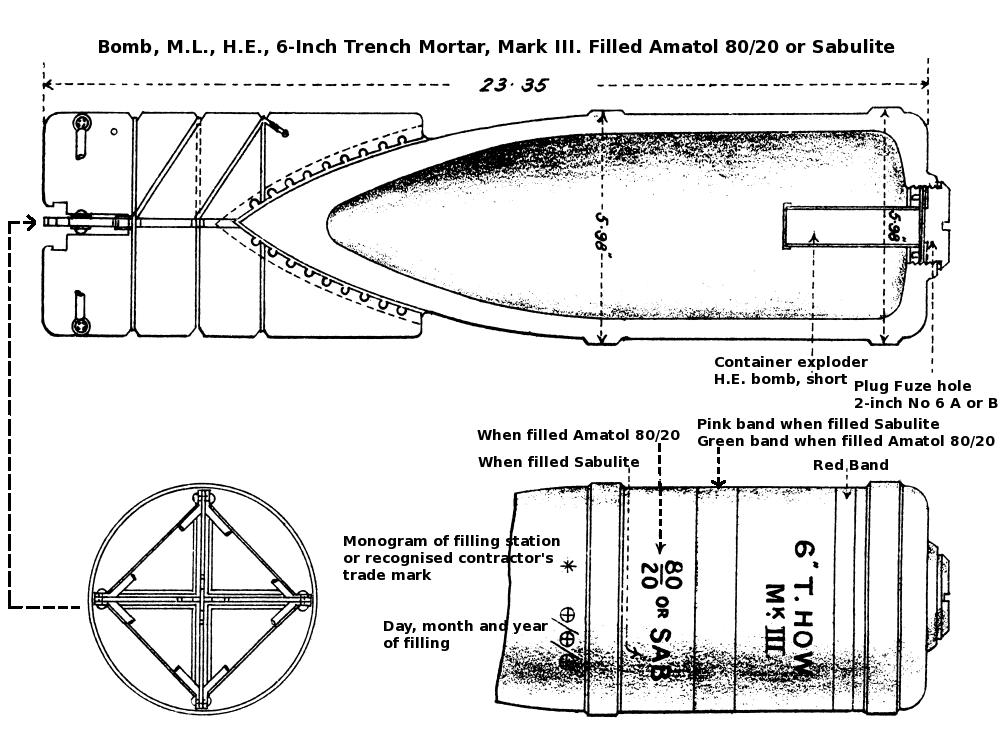
Mk III bomb diagram

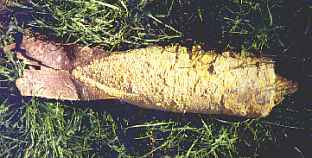
Bomb at Hawthorn Crater, Somme 1998.

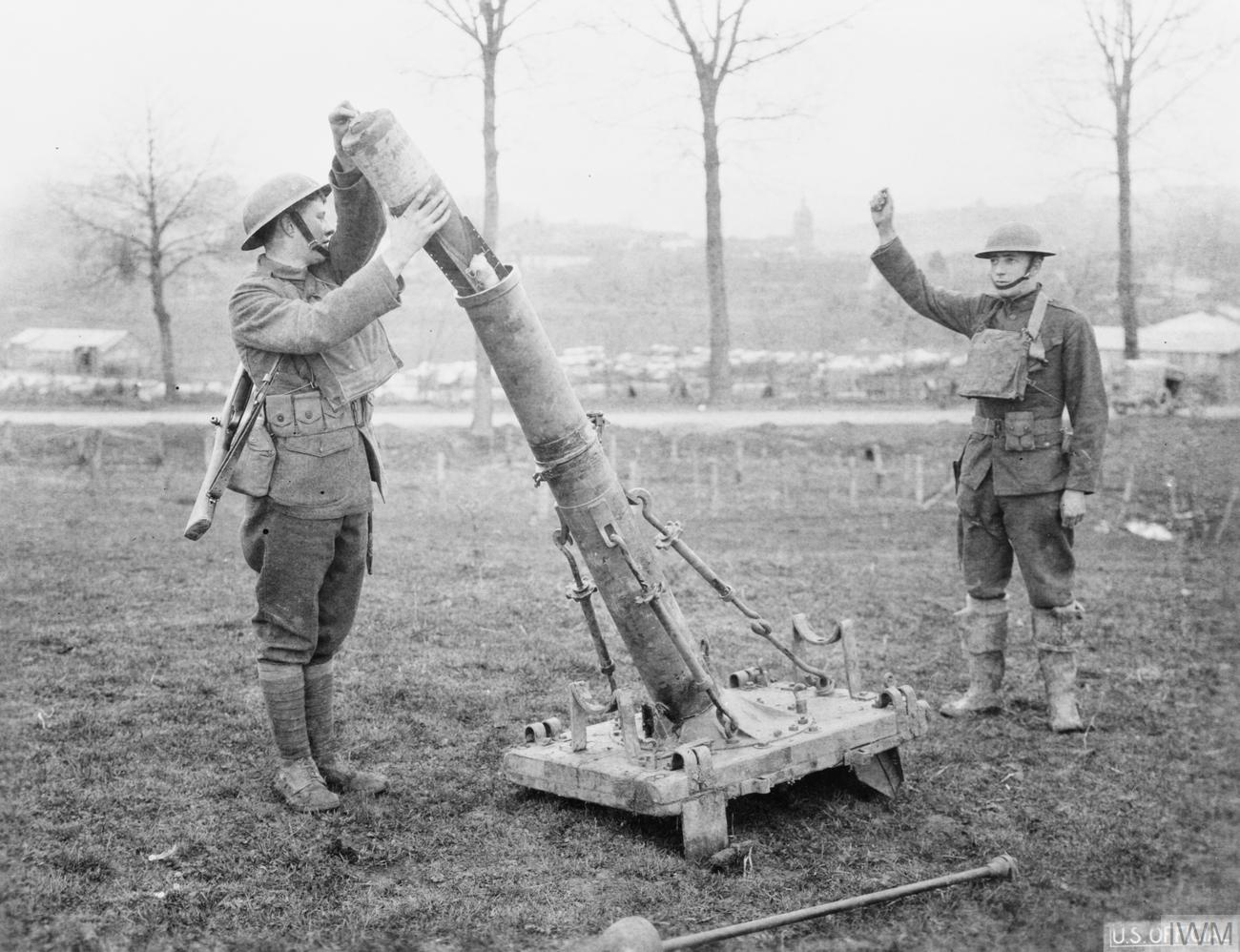
American gunners loading a 6 inch Newton trench mortar at Vitrey, 15 January 1919

== See also ==
- List of heavy mortars

=== Weapons of comparable role, performance and era ===
- Mortier de 58 mm type 2 : approximate French equivalent

== Surviving examples ==
- Army Memorial Museum, Waiouru, New Zealand
- Royal Australian Artillery Museum, North Head, Sydney, Australia
- Australian Army Infantry Museum, Singleton NSW Australia
- Jonesborough-Washington County History Museum, Jonesborough, Tennessee - Displayed previously in the town square, now part of the Historical Society collection. Produced by Hadfields of Sheffield, England. Unknown how it came to reside in Tennessee.
- Fox River Grove, Illinois, USA, veterans memorial

== Bibliography ==
- Preliminary Notes on the M.L. 6-Inch Trench Mortar Mark I. 1917. War Office, UK.
- Handbook of the M.L. 6-Inch Trench Mortar Mark I. 1918. War Office, UK.
- W L Ruffell, "An example of Kiwi ingenuity. A carriage designed by the Divisional Trench Mortars to meet the changed conditions of fighting in the last advances of 1918"
- Handbook of artillery : including mobile, anti-aircraft and trench matériel (1920). United States. Army. Ordnance Dept, May 1920
- "History of the Ministry of Munitions", 1922. Volume XI, Part I Trench Warfare Supplies. Facsimile reprint by Imperial War Museum and Naval & Military Press, 2008 ISBN 1-84734-885-8
