= Mortier de 293 Danois sur affut-truck modèle 1914 =

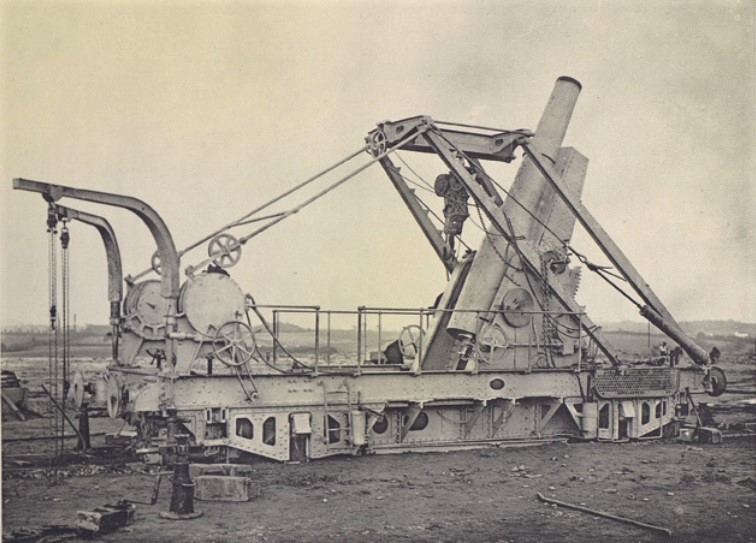
- Type: Railway gun Siege gun
- Place of origin: France

Service history
- In service: 1915–1945
- Used by: France
- Wars: World War I World War II

Production history
- Designer: Gun: Schneider; Carriage: St Chamond
- Manufacturer: Gun: Schneider; Carriage: St Chamond
- Produced: 1914
- No. built: 6+4 spare barrels

Specifications
- Mass: 50 t (49 long tons; 55 short tons)
- Length: 9.86 m (32 ft 4 in)
- Barrel length: 4.39 m (14 ft 5 in) L/15
- Shell weight: 300 kg (660 lb)
- Caliber: 293 mm (11.5 in)
- Action: Semi-automatic
- Breech: Interrupted screw
- Recoil: Hydro-gravity double recoil system
- Carriage: Dual-gauge rail bogie
- Elevation: +20 to +65°
- Traverse: 14°
- Rate of fire: 1 round every two minutes
- Muzzle velocity: 322 m/s (1,060 ft/s)
- Maximum firing range: 11.2 km (7 mi)

The Mortier de 293 Danois sur affut-truck modèle 1914 was a French railway gun and siege gun used by the French Army during World War I and World War II.

== History ==
Before the First World War, the doctrine of the French Army was geared towards a war of rapid maneuver. Although the majority of combatants had heavy field artillery prior to the outbreak of the First World War, none had adequate numbers of heavy guns in service and once the Western Front stagnated and trench warfare set in the light field guns that the combatants went to war with were beginning to show their limitations when facing an enemy who was now dug into prepared positions. Indirect fire, interdiction and counter-battery fire emphasized the importance of long-range heavy artillery. Since aircraft of the period were not yet capable of carrying large diameter bombs the burden of delivering heavy firepower fell on the artillery. Two sources of heavy artillery suitable for conversion to field use were surplus coastal defense guns and naval guns.

However, a paradox faced artillery designers of the time; while large caliber naval guns were common, large caliber land weapons were not due to their weight, complexity, and lack of mobility. Large caliber field guns often required extensive site preparation because the guns had to be broken down into multiple loads light enough to be towed by a horse team or the few traction engines of the time and then reassembled before use. Building a new gun could address the problem of disassembling, transporting and reassembling a large gun, but it did not necessarily address how to convert existing heavy weapons to make them more mobile. Rail transport proved to be the most practical solution because the problems of heavy weight, lack of mobility and reduced setup time were addressed.

== Design ==
- The guns - The mle 1914 started life as an order for six coastal defense guns manufactured by Schneider for Denmark. It was a typical built-up gun of the period made from steel with a rifled inner tube and reinforced by layers of external tubes. The recoil system for the gun consisted of a U-shaped gun cradle which held the trunnioned barrel and a slightly inclined firing platform with a hydro-gravity recoil system. When the gun fired the hydraulic buffers below the barrel slowed the recoil of the cradle which slid up a set of inclined rails on the firing platform and then returned the gun to position by the combined action of the buffers and gravity.
- Traverse and Elevation - The gun carriage employed a car traversing or berceau system where the car and trucks were placed on a base plate and could be traversed 14°. The base plate is arranged with a pintle in front and the car has two rollers behind. At the rear of the rail carriage, there was a shell hoist and there was also a small cart which ran on rails to the breech for ammunition handling. The gun could elevate between +20° and +65° and loaded at +45°.
- The breech - The guns had a semi-automatic interrupted screw breech that was tied to the recoil system which opened the breech after firing, loaded the next round, closed the breech, and cocked the firing mechanism. Although this system was complicated it gave the mortar a rate of fire of 1 round every two minutes which is high for a system with heavy 300 kg (660 lb) projectiles.
- Rail Carriage - Rather than being a true railway gun it was more of a multi-mode siege gun because the carriage built by St Chamond could be reconfigured to run on standard gauge rails, narrow gauge rails or fitted with road wheels like the Canon de 240 TR Mle 1903 which was similar in construction and configuration. In the center of the carriage, there were the two standard gauge 4-wheeled railroad bogies that could be raised or lowered. There was also a narrow gauge 4-wheeled bogie at both ends that could also be raised and lowered. Lastly, jackscrews are provided on the car body for transferring from one set of bogies to the other. Road wheels could be substituted for the narrow-gauge trucks and the carriage could be towed by a traction engine. At the front of the carriage, there was a shear leg derrick that could be used to load and unload the gun for transport. The normal procedure was to transport the gun fully assembled on standard-gauge rails until near the front and then disassemble the gun and transport it on narrow-gauge rails or on its road wheels. Site preparation consisted of creating a level piece of ground by laying a bed of stones and timbers then lowering the carriage onto the base plate. The base plate is prevented from moving by two anchors buried in front of the mount. The gun is then reassembled on the base plate and made ready for action.

== World War I ==
The six mle 1914 mortars and four spare barrels were assigned to 61st, 62nd and 63rd batteries of the 25th Group of the 3rd RAP of the ALGP (artillerie lourde à grande puissance) on 21 February 1916. On 1 August 1917, the mortars and spares were reorganized into two batteries and assigned to 21st and 22nd batteries of the 11th Group of the 73rd RALGP. They were used during the Battle of the Somme in 1916 and two were sent to reinforce the Italian Front during 1917. All six mortars survived the First world war.

== World War II ==
The six mle 1914 mortars were placed in reserve between the wars. Four were mobilized and deployed by the 371° Regiment of the ALVF (Artillery lourde sur voie ferrée) to reinforce the Maginot Line defenses.

== Gallery ==
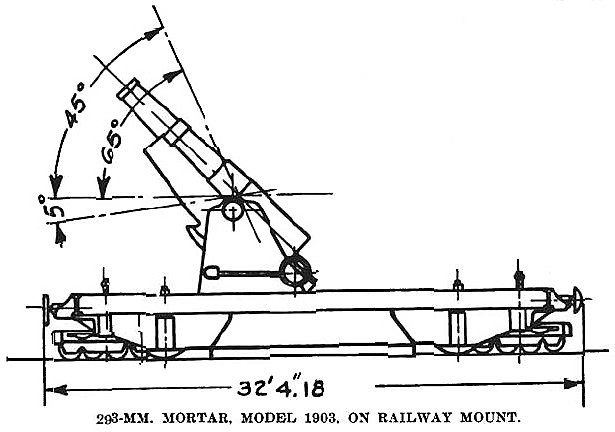
A mle 1914 showing its loading and maximum elevation.

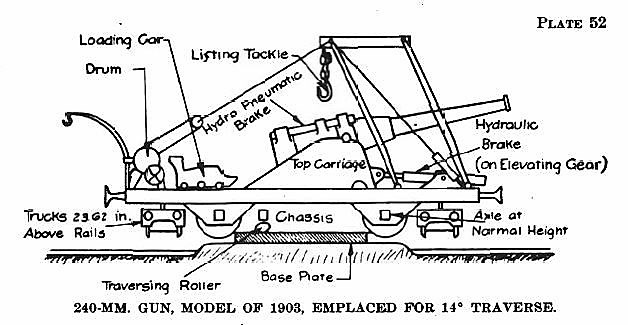
A schematic of the similar Canon de 240 mle 1903 showing its Berceau mount.

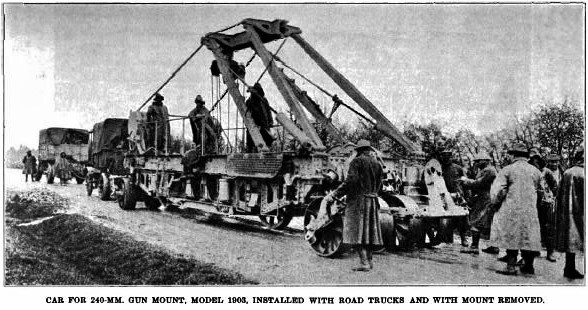
A Canon de 240 mle 1903 carriage placed on road wheels without gun.

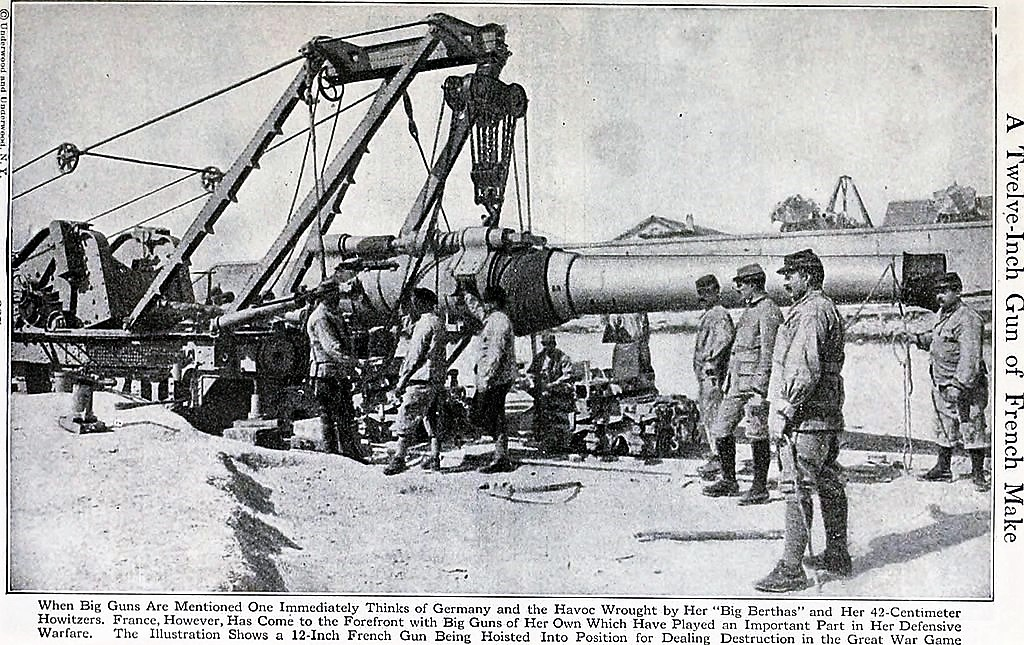
Reassembling a Canon de 240 mle 1903 onsite.
