= 26 cm Minenwerfer M 17 =

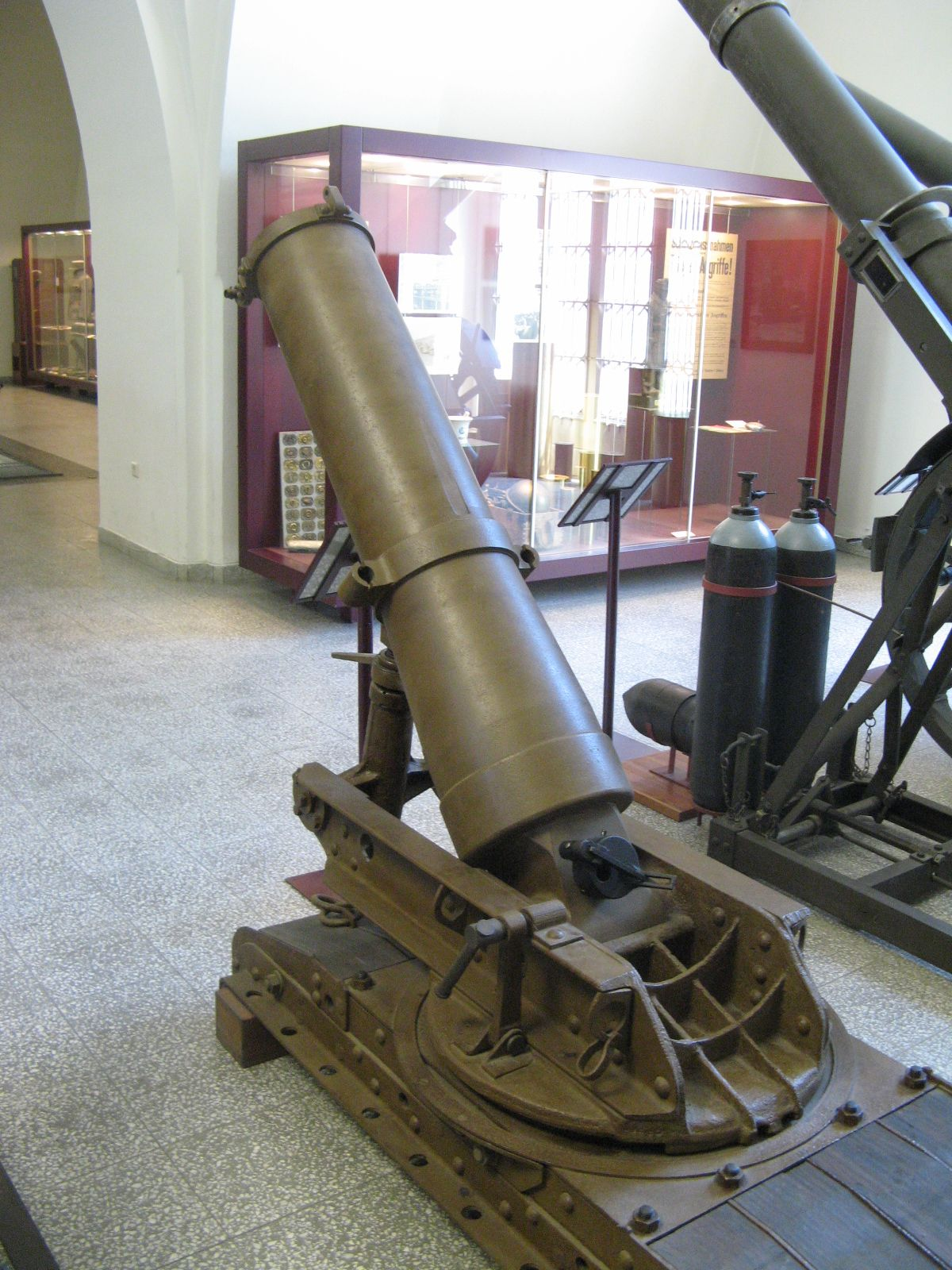
- Böhler model at the Heeresgeschichtliches Museum, Vienna
- Type: Heavy trench mortar
- Place of origin: Austria-Hungary

Service history
- In service: 1917–1924, 1938–1939
- Used by: Austria-Hungary; Austria; Czechoslovakia; Slovak Republic
- Wars: World War I

Production history
- Designer: Skoda
- Designed: 1917
- Manufacturer: Skoda, Böhler, Hungarian Gun Factory
- Produced: 1917–1918
- No. built: 300

Specifications
- Mass: 1,550 kg (3,420 lb)
- Crew: 6
- Shell weight: 83 kg (183 lb)
- Caliber: 260 mm (10 in)
- Elevation: 34° to 80°
- Traverse: 0°
- Maximum firing range: 1,450 m (1,590 yd)

The 26 cm Minenwerfer M 17 was a heavy trench mortar used by Austria-Hungary in World War I. It was developed by Skoda as an alternative to copying captured Italian 240 mm Trench Mortars. Skoda presented two versions, one with a rigid barrel, and the other with a recoil system. The former was chosen as it was simpler to produce. It was a muzzle-loading, rifled mortar that had to be levered around to aim at new targets. It disassembled into four pieces for transport.

First deliveries began in March 1918. Production averaged between thirty-six and forty a month for the rest of the war.

== Bibliography ==
- Ortner, M. Christian. The Austro-Hungarian Artillery From 1867 to 1918: Technology, Organization, and Tactics. Vienna, Verlag Militaria, 2007 ISBN 978-3-902526-13-7
