= Blitzkrieg 3 =

2017 online RTS computer game

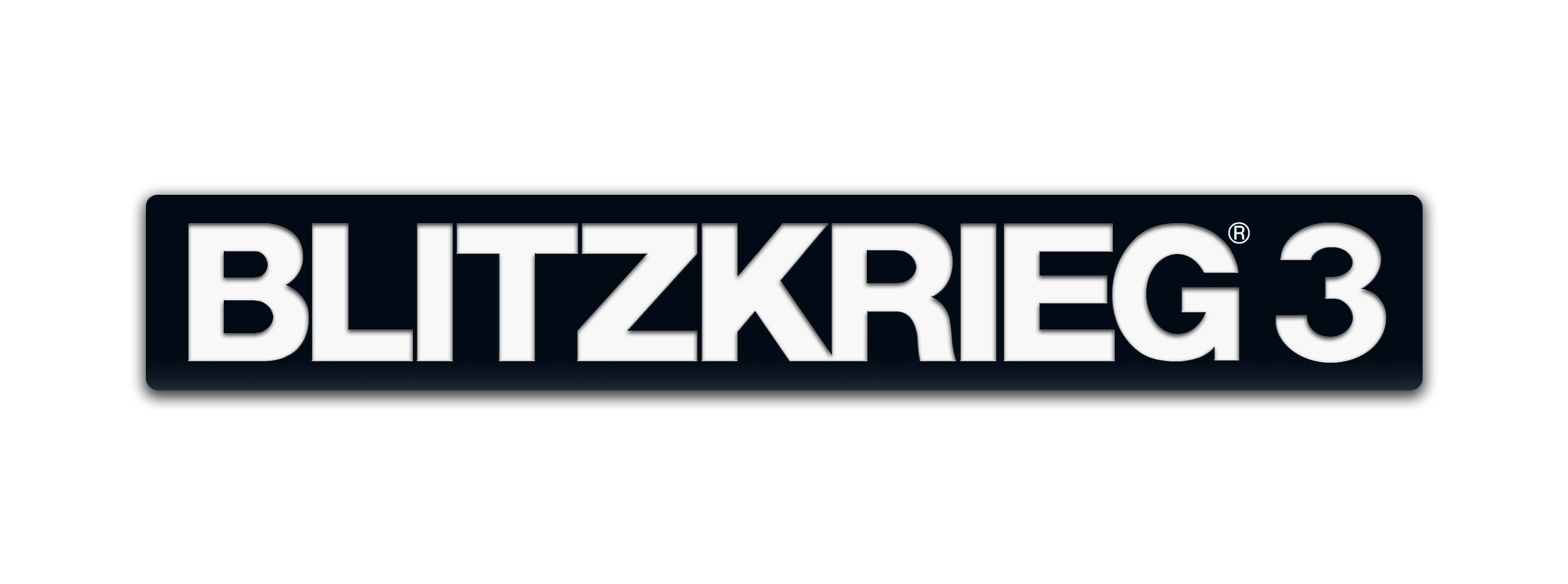
- Developer: Nival
- Publisher: Nival
- Series: Blitzkrieg
- Engine: Unity
- Platforms: Microsoft Windows macOS
- Release: June 2, 2017
- Genre: Massively multiplayer online real-time strategy game
- Modes: Single-player, multiplayer

Blitzkrieg 3 (Russian: Блицкриг 3) was an online massively multiplayer online real-time strategy computer game, based on the events of World War II, a sequel to Blitzkrieg 2 and is the third and latest title in the Blitzkrieg series. Nival published the first trailer for the game on YouTube on August 13, 2013, featuring live action footage mixed with concept artwork and actual in-game footage and renders. Blitzkrieg's pre-order campaign was launched in November 2014. Blitzkrieg 3 hit Steam Early Access in May 2015, and was released on June 2, 2017, and its multiplayer component was shut down on December 14, 2022, with singleplayer and skirmish remaining available.

== Gameplay ==
=== Neural Network AI ===
Nival claims that Blitzkrieg 3 features the world's first Neural Network AI for in an RTS game. According to the company, the AI, Boris, is capable of analysing games and developing strategies, making it less predictable than a conventional AI.

=== Single-player campaign ===
Blitzkrieg 3's campaign covers the main period of World War II; from the invasion of Poland in 1939 to the capture of Berlin in 1945. Each of three campaigns provides a unique blend of PvE, PvP and PvAI missions. In total, the game features 60+ historical missions with 200+ authentic combat units. Each unit has performance characteristics reconstructed in detail, such as fire rate, armored capture, field of vision, and other factors that immerse the player in the commanding experience. The PvE part of the game features 3 campaigns:

- Axis
- Western Allies
- USSR

=== Features ===
In addition to classic Skirmish 1x1, 2x2, and 3x3 modes, Blitzkrieg 3 featured an asymmetric Assault mode, wherein one player attacks and the other defends their fortifications. Additionally, 20+ historical commanders with their own specialization and favorite combat tactics, combined with a dynamic weather system, make every game even more diverse.

Additionally, the game features no microtransactions, which means that the player only pays the box price of the game, with the possibility of purchasing DLC later on. This lack of microtransactions was decided early during production.

== Downloadable content ==
=== Deluxe Edition ===
The Deluxe Edition is available as a downloadable upgrade pack in the Steam store and includes:

- Three exclusive single-player missions, one for each faction. The German campaign mission features 'Dora' railway gun.
- Exclusive generals, such as Rokossovsky, Manstein, and Montgomery.
- Unique tank models that replace standard combat vehicles.
- Various in-game rewards, such as the 'Silver' nickname color, and the Great Leader's Statue, which is an authentic monument to an iconic figure, for the army chosen by the player.
