= Largest cannon =

Largest cannon may refer to:

- List of the largest cannon by caliber, a list of the largest cannon throughout history

The largest individual cannon:

- Tsar Cannon, the largest bombard
- Little David and Mallet's Mortar, the largest artillery pieces by caliber
