= Blitzkrieg (video game series) =

Blitzkrieg series
- The series logo in Blitzkrieg
- Genre: Real-time tactics
- Developer: Nival Interactive
- Publishers: CDV; 1C Company; Virtual Programming (OS X)
- Platforms: Windows, Mac
- First release: Blitzkrieg; 2003
- Latest release: Blitzkrieg 3; 2014

The Blitzkrieg series is a collection of real-time tactics (RTT) computer games set in World War II.

== Gameplay ==
Similar to the Sudden Strike games, Blitzkrieg focuses on battles rather than real-time strategy aspects like base building.

=== Multiplayer ===
Each Blitzkrieg game has included the ability to play multiplayer games against other humans, with the latest entry in the series Blitzkrieg 3 implementing massively multiplayer online real-time strategy game elements.

== Games ==
=== Blitzkrieg ===
Blitzkrieg (Russian: Блицкриг) is a real-time tactics computer game based on the events of World War II. The game allows players to assume the role of commanding officer during the battles of World War II that occurred in Europe and North Africa.

=== Blitzkrieg 2 ===
Blitzkrieg 2 (Russian: Блицкриг II) is an evolution of its predecessor Blitzkrieg. The game takes place in Africa, Russia, the Pacific and Europe, and features the 6 different factions portrayed in the game that fought in their battle respective grounds during the war.

=== Blitzkrieg 3 ===
Blitzkrieg 3 (Russian: Блицкриг III) is an in-development massively multiplayer online real-time strategy game computer game based on the events of World War II and is the sequel to Blitzkrieg 2.

== See also ==
- Stalingrad (2005 video game), a related game using Nival's Enigma Engine
