= Little David (disambiguation) =

Little David was the nickname of an American World War II mortar.

Little David may also refer to:

- Little David Records, a record label started in 1969 by comedian Flip Wilson and his manager
- Little David, a pseudonym of David Porter (musician) (born 1969), American record producer, songwriter, singer, entrepreneur and philanthropist
- Little David Wilkins (born 1945), American country music singer, songwriter and pianist
- Little David, a spaceship in the novel Between Planets by Robert Heinlein
