= Boris Yulin =

Russian author (born 1967)

- Born: 7 July 1967; Khabarovsk
- Education: Moscow Aviation Institute, State University of Education
- Occupations: Historian, military historian, opinion writer, writer, blogger, political scientist
- Awards: Delvig Prize (2020)

Boris Vitaliyevich Yulin (Russian: Борис Витальевич Юлин; born 7 July 1967 in Khabarovsk, Soviet Union) is a Russian author. He is also a military historian and blogger.

== Biography ==
He graduated from the Moscow Aviation Institute and the Moscow State Regional University.

Yulin started his career working at the Moscow State Regional University. He served in the Strategic Rocket Forces. He has also worked for games companies including Nival and for Blitzkrieg he was working on the game. He works for the Institute of Far Eastern Studies, Russian Academy of Sciences.

Since 2014, he has been broadcasting on Dmitry Puchkov's channel on YouTube.

He is awarded the Delvig Prize (2020). He was criticized by Mikhail Vasilyevich Popov, Sergey Kurginyan and Alexander Maysuryan.

== Personal life ==
He lives and works in Moscow. He is married.

== Bibliography ==
Year	Title
2008	Бородинская битва (Яуза, Эксмо) ISBN 978-5-699-26647-0
2017	Вехи русской истории
2018	Бородино: стоять и умирать! (with a foreword by Puchkov)
2018	Русско-японская война 1904—1905 гг. ISBN 978-5-4461-0703-2
2019 (2018)	Войны конца Российской империи
