= Stalin vs. Martians =

2009 video game

- Developers: Black Wing Foundation; Dreamlore; N-Game
- Publisher: Mezmer Games
- Platform: Microsoft Windows
- Release: April 29, 2009
- Genre: Real-time strategy
- Mode: Single-player

Stalin vs. Martians is a parody real-time strategy video game developed by Black Wing Foundation, Dreamlore and N-Game, released on April 29, 2009. Described as "trashy and over-the-top" by its creators, the game mocks World War II strategy games and utilizes pythonesque humor. The developers state that Stalin vs. Martians is "obviously a parody, which sometimes gets close to being a satire" and is "halfway to becoming a trash icon of gaming industry for years". In some interviews the lead designer of the game compares Stalin vs. Martians to the Troma films.

In July, following the game's release, it became no longer available to be purchased, for unknown reasons. The official website claimed that an upgraded version of Stalin vs. Martians would soon be released; however, the game was never made available again, neither in original or upgraded version. This game uses the same updated version of the Enigma Engine as Blitzkrieg 2.

Stalin vs. Martians received overwhelmingly negative reviews from critics and is considered to be one of the worst games of all time.

== Reception ==
Stalin vs. Martians received overwhelmingly negative reviews from critics. It has an average score of 23.41% on GameRankings as well as 25% on Metacritic. GameSpot awarded the game 1.5/10, calling it "perhaps the worst RTS game ever created". The site also named it 2009's Flat-Out Worst Game. IGN, which rated the game a 2/10, noted the game's total lack of any RTS-related elements and asked whether it was 'made in 1994 and sealed into a vault until 2009' given how dated the visuals looked. Resolution, awarding the game 35%, warned readers not to purchase the game, but conceded that it is occasionally "incredibly amusing". Rock, Paper, Shotgun called the game "rubbish" but admitted that "there's certainly car-crash value, especially if you tie yourself in theoretical knots deciding exactly how much of the game is satire". The Escapist was more positive; it criticized the visuals, customization, controls, and lack of strategy but cited absurdist humor as a redeeming feature. Russian MTV programme Virtuality and its spin-off portal Games TV were quite enthusiastic about the game and its humour.

== See also ==
- List of video games notable for negative reception
