= Blitzkrieg (video game) =

2003 video game

- Developer: Nival Interactive
- Publishers: CDV; 1C Company; Virtual Programming (OS X version)
- Designers: Dmitry Devishev; Alexander Vinnikov; Boris Yulin; Igor Petukhov; Serge Orlovsky
- Series: Blitzkrieg
- Engine: Enigma engine
- Platforms: Windows, Mac
- Release: RU: March 28, 2003; NA: May 12, 2003; EU: May 15, 2003
- Genre: Real-time tactics
- Modes: Single-player, multiplayer

Blitzkrieg (Russian: Блицкриг) is a 2003 real-time tactics video game based on the events of World War II and is the first title in the Blitzkrieg series. The game allows players to assume the role of commanding officer during the battles of World War II that occurred in Europe and North Africa. Each country has its respective historically correct military units. Similar to the Sudden Strike games, Blitzkrieg focuses on battles rather than real-time strategy aspects like base building.

Virtual Programming published a Mac OS X version of the game on the Mac App Store on April 20, 2011.

Certain versions of the original game, and several sequels, use the StarForce copy protection system. Blitzkrieg Anthology does not appear to use StarForce.

Graphics deliver realistic 3-D rendered isometric terrain and details include seasons, climatic zones and weather conditions which can affect game play. Blood is present although it can be deactivated. The game features over 350 different units and objects. The player has the ability to build pontoon bridges, dig trenches, lay mines, resupply and repair units or call in air support but there are no resources. Virtually everything can be destroyed including buildings and bridges. Forests can be flattened by tanks or artillery. Each unit of a respective nation speaks its own language, adding immensely to the immersion.

The game shipped with a mission and resource editors for users to create their own units and maps.

In 2025 the Source code of the game was released.

== Gameplay ==
The game is split into three modes: campaign, multiplayer and custom game. Blitzkrieg centers on 3 distinctive campaigns which features some of the major factions battling it out in World War II. They feature the Allies (American and British campaigns), the Germans, and the Soviets. Each of those attempt to chronologically re-enact the time periods of the war by devising Chapters into each of the campaigns.

Each player starts with 'core units'. These named units would be the same personnel accompanying the player throughout the chosen Campaign and may gain rank and experience as the player progresses from one Chapter to the other. As they fight, units will expend their ammunition, forcing the player to pay attention. Each of the individual units can be used separately or in groups, and by highlighting vehicles or humans, groups can be created and then called by a button at any time. Because of the dismissal of base-building and unit spawning, strategy is a key ingredient of overall gameplay.

== Reception ==
Reception

Aggregate score
Aggregator	Score
Metacritic	74/100

Review scores
Publication	Score
Computer Games Magazine	3/5
Computer Gaming World	3.5/5
GameSpot	7.1/10
IGN	8.2/10
PC Gamer (US)	68/100

Blizkrieg received mid to high reviews, earning an aggregate 74/100 on Metacritic.

IGN rated the game highly, giving it an 8.2/10 and praising its gameplay, systems, variety of vehicles and infantry, UI/UX, and increased historical accuracy over its predecessors.

GameSpot found more flaws in the game but found it generally enjoyable, rating it 7.1/10. They praised the gameplay and features but criticized some of the levels' designs and audio.

Computer Gaming World found that while fun, Blitzkrieg fell short of delivering a good, realistic wargame. They praised the game's research and the way it captured the feel of tactical operations. The main flaws they found were in the game's scope, aircraft mechanics, and lack of extra features. They awarded the game 3.5/5, calling it "the best World War II real-time gaming experience to date."

PC Gamer also praised Blitzkrieg's research and combat but found fault with the RTS gameplay, considering it needlessly complicated, restrictive, and finicky. They rated the game 68/100.

Computer Games Magazine gave the game a 3/5. They found Blitzkrieg derivative, generic, and simplisitc, but they enjoyed its balance and quick-paced gameplay. While the game improves on the genre in some ways, they found that it carried forward many of its predecessors' faults.

== Add-ons ==
There are three official expansions of the original Blitzkrieg to date, all three developed by La Plata Studios (Germany) in collaboration with Nival Interactive, the developer of the original Blitzkrieg game. They are published and distributed by CDV Interactive. The base game Blitzkrieg was released together with its three expansions as Blitzkrieg Anthology.

- Blitzkrieg: Burning Horizon follows the footsteps of General Erwin Rommel starting from the crossing of the Ardennes to the battles of the Afrika Korps and continuing to the last struggle of German resistance in occupied France. It also includes a new nation, Japan, with unique new units and weaponry (Belgium is also added, in single player only as an enemy), as well as 8 brand new single player missions, in which battles rage in many different countries and islands, from the Pacific island of Papua New Guinea to the jungles of Burma and Singapore and the deserts of Northern Africa and much more. It also includes over 56 new and improved units, including tanks, aircraft, squads, and artillery. It was first released in Germany in April 2004, although a Finnish release may have come earlier. It was then sold in English-language and several other markets in June.
- Blitzkrieg: Rolling Thunder traces the career of General George S. Patton during World War II ranging from the deserts of the North African campaign to the snowy forests of the Ardennes during the Battle of the Bulge. Rolling Thunder is also known as Roar of the Storm or Rumble of the Storm in the Russian market. It was first released in November 2004.
- Blitzkrieg: Iron Division, also known as Green Devils, is an expansion that requires Blitzkrieg and Rolling Thunder in order to play. The Green Devils add-on is also known as Devils in Khaki in the Russian market. Unlike the first two expansions, it is not a full campaign, but a set of 4 custom missions. It follows the German 9th Panzer Division's actions in the Battle of France, the Eastern Front and the Normandy campaign. It also includes 1st airborne campaign called Eagles as well as a few new units and a new campaign: Tank School. First released in June 2005, it was sold in the US in September 2006.

== Stand-alone games ==
The "Enigma Engine" used in Blitzkrieg was heavily outsourced and plenty of games were made using the engine:

- Stalingrad, developed by Russian developers DTF Games, is a stand-alone game covering the advance toward and the battle for Stalingrad from both the German and Soviet sides. It was first released in December 2004, and then in the UK in March 2005. A Steam digital version was released in March 2015. It is unrelated to the similarly worded Great Battles: Stalingrad spin-off game from a different developer, built on the Blitzkrieg 2 engine and released in 2007.
- Talvisota: Icy Hell, developed by Blitzfront Game Studio, is a game based on the Finnish-Russian Winter War in 1939–1940. It was first released in November 2007.
- WWI: The Great War, developed by Dark Fox, is a World War I-based game built on the Blitzkreg engine. The player assumes the role of the commanding officer of either the armed forces of the United Kingdom, France, Russia, Germany or Austria-Hungary on the battlefields of the Great War with the country's respective weaponry from 1914 to 1918. It was first released in June 2005, and an initial UK budget retail label was released in 2008. As of April 2015, the game is now officially available on Steam.
- Mission Barbarossa and Kursk developed by UK developers ACTive Gaming, follow the invasion of the Soviet Union in 1941 and the Battle of Kursk in 1943. The Mission Barbarossa add-on is also known as Eastern Front in the Russian market. Mission Barbarossa and Kursk were first released in January 2005 (as a Russian budget label) and August 2005, respectively.
- Blitzkrieg: Operation "North", developed by Dark Fox, was released in February 2004.
- Panzerkrieg: Burning Horizon 2 was developed by German studio La Plata Studios, who also made the official expansions Burning Horizon & Rolling Thunder. Burning Horizon II is an unofficial compilation of three previously released games in the series — Blitzkrieg: Red Horizon (Soviet), Blitzkrieg: Rolling Thunder (American), and Blitzkrieg: Lost Victories (German) and released in Germany in October 2008 and UK in June 2009. In the sequel, players can choose between the Allied, German or Soviet campaigns, reliving key battles from history such as the Battle of the Bulge, Operation Sturgeon Catch and Battle of the Frontiers.

=== Non-WWII or WWI based ===
- Conflict 2012: Operation Kosovo Sunrise was developed by Patriote Interactive and La Plata Studios, who has experience in releasing unofficial add-ons. This game is set in 2012 in the Balkans as the players take command of a special mixed army unit in an attempt to stop invasion. The main factions are the NATO and Serbian forces. It was released in limited batches in Serbian/Cyrillic and/or maybe Russian language in October 2009. The English language retail version or patch also had a limited release around June 2010. The 2012 mod version is available at Mod DB.
- Cuban Missile Crisis: The Aftermath was developed by G5 Software LLC. This game, built on the Enigma engine used by Blitzkrieg, provides a hypothetical scenario in which the 1962 Cuban Missile Crisis became a full-blown worldwide nuclear war. It was first released in Russia in February 2005 with some other European releases following later the same year. The US retail edition was first released in November 2005 and was digitally available on GamersGate in March 2008. The Russian developers also made a standalone expansion to this game called Cuban Missile Crisis: Ice Crusade, set in 1967, five years after the Cuban Missile Crisis which turned into a nuclear war. This expansion was first released in Russia in June 2005 and was digitally released on GamersGate in May 2009. Both games went on the Steam digital shop in March 2015.
- Desert Law was developed by Arise and used a modified version of Blitzkrieg's engine. It is a real-time strategy game set in the southern states of post-apocalyptic America, but without base building. The storytelling is told through comic book cutscenes as well as in-mission dialog. Mechanically, it is similar to Command & Conquer, and visually similar to the early Fallout games. It was first released in retail form in April 2005. It is also known Coyotes: Desert Law in Russia and Desert Law: Warriors of the Desert in Poland. It was digitally available on GamersGate in March 2008 and a Steam digital version was released in March 2015.

=== Panzerkrieg - Burning Horizon II ===
Hamburg-based La Plata Studios (developers of the Burning Horizon, Rolling Thunder and Green Devils titles) released Panzerkrieg - Burning Horizon II in 2008. The project was produced in conjunction with the head of the original Blitzkrieg team. By the end of October 2008, the game was released in Germany where it was successful and sold more copies than any Blitzkrieg 2 extension.
