= Schwerer Gustav =

German railway supergun

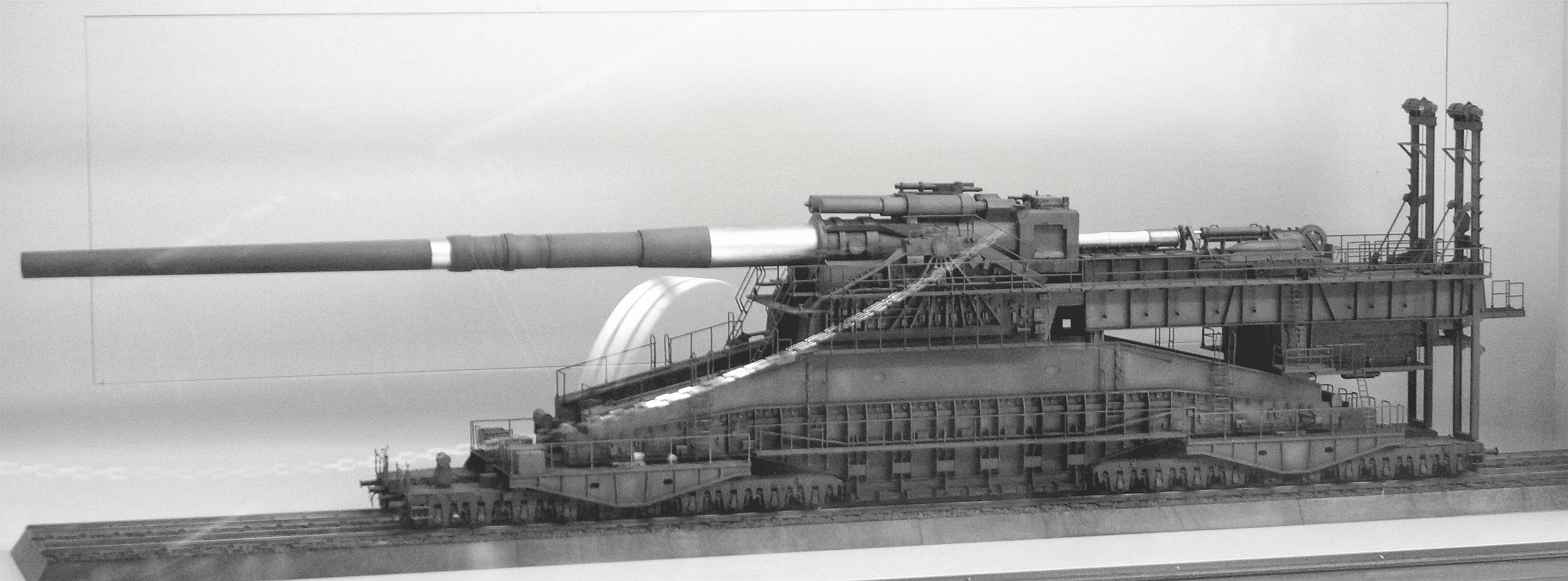
- Model of the Schwerer Gustav/Dora
- Type: Railway gun
- Place of origin: Nazi Germany

Service history
- In service: 1941–1945
- Used by: Wehrmacht
- Wars: World War II

Production history
- Designer: Krupp
- Designed: 1937
- Manufacturer: Krupp
- Unit cost: 7 million ℛ︁ℳ︁
- Produced: 1941
- No. built: 1 (supposedly 2)

Specifications
- Mass: 1,350 tonnes (1,490 short tons; 1,330 long tons)
- Length: 47.3 metres (155 ft 2 in)
- Barrel length: 32.5 metres (106 ft 8 in) L/40.6
- Width: 7.1 metres (23 ft 4 in)
- Height: 11.6 metres (38 ft 1 in)
- Diameter: 800 mm
- Crew: 250 to assemble the gun in 3 days (54 hours), 2,500 to lay track and dig embankments. 2 flak battalions to protect the gun from air attack.
- Shell: Armor-Piercing Shell (AP); High-Explosive Shell (HE)
- Caliber: 80 cm (31 in)
- Elevation: Max of 48°
- Rate of fire: 1 round every 30–45 minutes or typically 14 rounds a day
- Muzzle velocity: 820 m/s (2,700 ft/s) (HE); 720 m/s (2,400 ft/s) (AP)
- Effective firing range: c. 39,000 metres (43,000 yd)
- Maximum firing range: 47,000 metres (51,000 yd) (HE); 38,000 metres (42,000 yd) (AP)

Schwerer Gustav (German pronunciation: [ˈʃveːʁɐ ˈɡʊstaf]; lit. 'Heavy Gustav') was a German 0.8-metre (2 ft 7.5 in) railway gun. It was created in the late 1930s by Krupp in Rügenwalde; there are theories of another one being built, but only one was ever actually fired. They were created as siege artillery for the explicit purpose of destroying the main forts of the French Maginot Line, the strongest fortifications in existence at the time. The fully assembled gun weighed nearly 1,350 tonnes (1,490 short tons) and could fire high-explosive shells weighing 4.8 t (5.3 short tons) to a range of 47 km (29 mi), or armour-piercing shells weighing 7.1 t (7.8 short tons) to a range of 38 km (24 mi).

The gun was designed in preparation for the Battle of France but was not ready for action when that battle began, and the Wehrmacht offensive through Belgium rapidly outflanked and isolated the Maginot Line, which was then besieged with more conventional heavy guns until French capitulation. Gustav was later deployed in the Soviet Union during the Battle of Sevastopol, part of Operation Barbarossa, where, among other things, it destroyed a munitions depot located roughly 30 m (98 ft) below sea level. The gun was moved to Leningrad, and may have been intended to be used in the Warsaw Uprising like other German heavy siege pieces, but the uprising was crushed before it could be prepared to fire. Gustav was destroyed by the Germans near the end of the war in 1945 to avoid capture by the Soviet Red Army.

Schwerer Gustav was the largest-calibre rifled weapon ever used in combat, and in terms of weight, the heaviest mobile artillery piece ever built. It fired the heaviest shells of any artillery piece. It was surpassed in calibre only by the British Mallet's Mortar and the American Little David bomb-testing mortar—both at 36 inches (91.5 cm)—but was the only one of the three to go into action.

== Development ==
Schwerer Gustav (black) compared to an OTR-21 Tochka SRBM launcher (red) (which launches projectiles of similar size and range) with human figures for scale

In 1934, the German Army High Command (Oberkommando des Heeres (OKH)) commissioned Krupp of Essen to design a gun to destroy the forts of the French Maginot Line that were nearing completion. The gun's shells had to punch through seven metres of reinforced concrete or one full metre of steel armour plate, from beyond the range of French artillery. Krupp engineer Erich Müller calculated that the task would require a weapon with a calibre of around 80 centimetres (31 in), firing a projectile weighing seven tonnes (15,000 lb) from a barrel 30 metres (98 ft) long. The weapon would have a weight of over 1,000 tonnes (1,100 short tons). The size and weight meant that to be at all movable it would need to be supported on twin sets of railway tracks. The railway tracks were specifically engineered to accommodate the immense weight and size of Schwerer Gustav. Constructed with reinforced steel, these tracks provided a stable foundation for the weapon's movement. Specialized locomotives and cranes were employed to transport and position the gun with precision.

In common with smaller railway guns, the only barrel movement on the mount itself would be elevation, traverse being managed by moving the weapon along a curved section of railway line. Krupp prepared plans for calibres of 70 cm, 80 cm, 85 cm, and 1 m.

Nothing further happened until March 1936 when, during a visit to Essen, Adolf Hitler inquired as to the giant guns' feasibility. No definite commitment was given by Hitler, but design work began on an 80 cm model. The resulting plans were completed in early 1937 and approved. Fabrication of the gun started in mid-1937. Technical complications in the forging of such massive pieces of steel made it apparent that the original completion date of early 1940 could not be met.

Krupp built a test model in late 1939 and sent it to the Hillersleben proving ground for testing. Penetration was tested on this occasion. Firing at high elevation, the 7,100-kilogram (15,700 lb) shell was able to penetrate the specified seven metres of concrete and the one metre armour plate. When the tests were completed in mid-1940 the complex carriage was further developed. Alfried Krupp, after whose father the gun was named, personally hosted Hitler at the Rügenwalde (now Darłowo, Poland) Proving Ground during the formal acceptance trials of the Gustav Gun in early 1941.

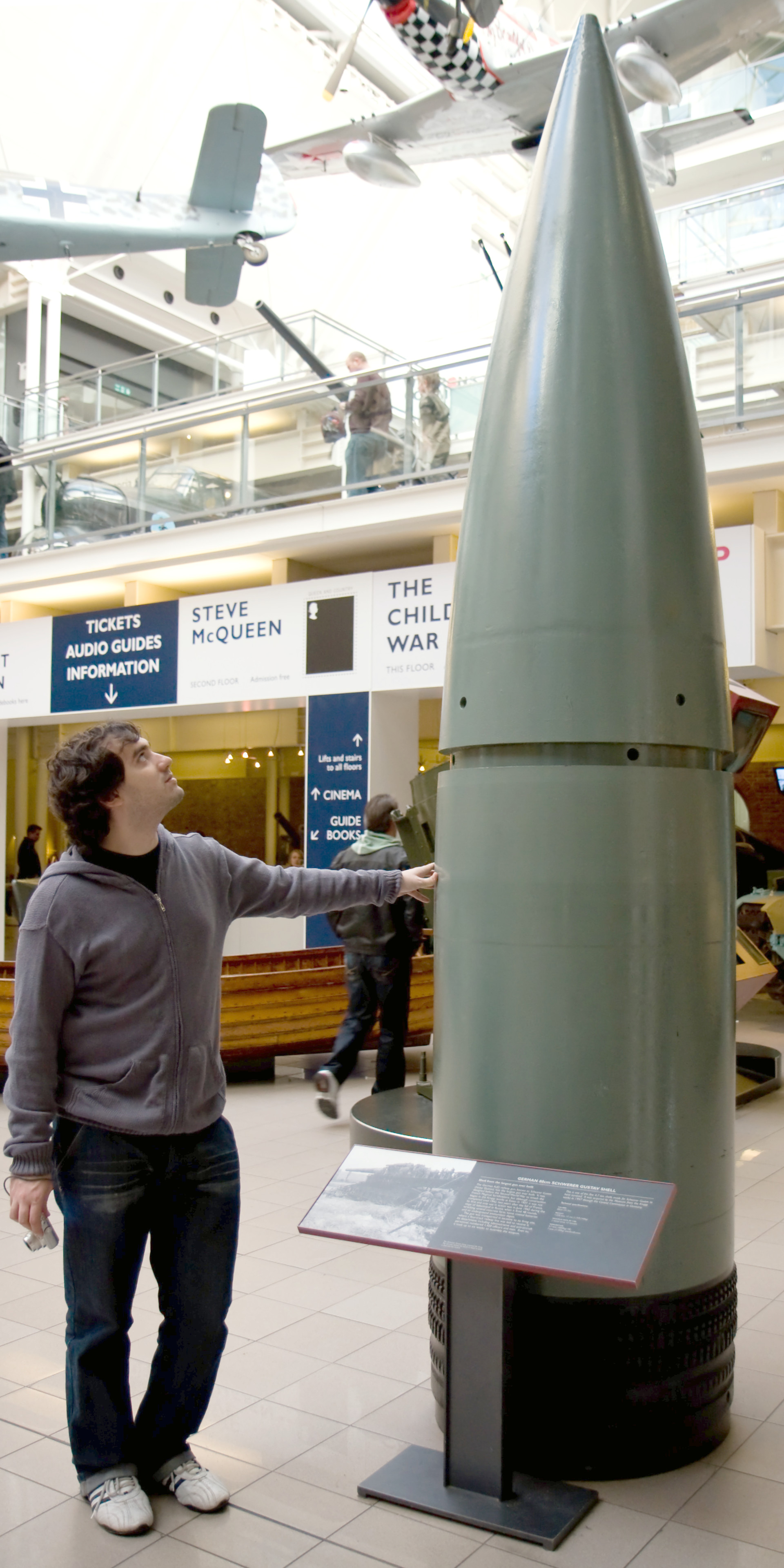
An 800 mm Schwerer Gustav shell at the Imperial War Museum, London. Man for comparison

Two guns were ordered. The first round was test-fired from the commissioned gun barrel on 10 September 1941 from a makeshift gun carriage at Hillersleben. In November 1941, the barrel was taken to Rügenwalde, where eight further firing tests were carried out using the 7,100 kilogram armour-piercing (AP) shell out to a range of 37,210 metres (23.12 miles).

In combat, the gun was mounted on a specially designed chassis, supported by eight bogies on two parallel railway tracks. Each of the bogies had five axles, giving a total of 40 axles (80 wheels). Krupp named the gun Schwerer Gustav (Heavy Gustav) after the senior director of the firm, Gustav Krupp von Bohlen und Halbach.

The gun could fire a heavy concrete-piercing shell and a lighter high-explosive shell. An extremely-long-range rocket projectile was also planned with a range of 150 kilometres (93 mi), that would require the barrel being extended to 84 metres (276 ft).

In keeping with the tradition of the Krupp company, no payment was asked for the first gun. They charged seven million Reichsmark (approximately 24 million USD in 2015) for the second gun, Dora, named after the senior engineer's wife (supposedly).

== History ==
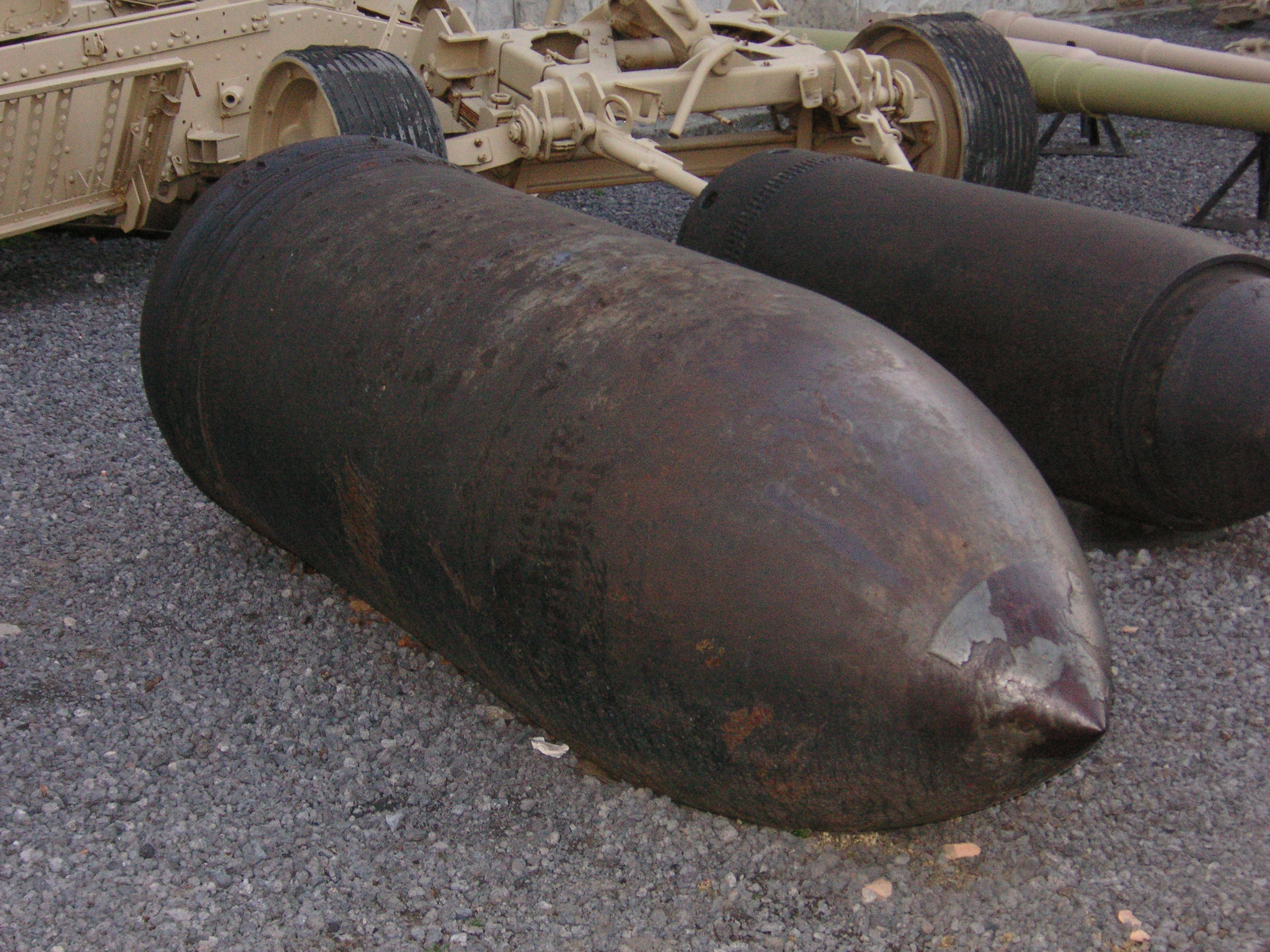
A shell for the Gustav gun (without the sharp ballistic cap) found after the war at the former German firing range near Rügenwalde (today Darłowo), on exhibition in the Polish Army museum in Warsaw

=== Schwerer Gustav ===
In February 1942, Heavy Artillery Unit (E) 672 reorganised and went on the march, and Schwerer Gustav began its long ride to Crimea. The train carrying the gun was of 25 cars, a total length of 1.5 kilometres (0.9 mi). The gun reached the Perekop Isthmus in early March 1942, where it was held until early April. The Germans built a special railway spur line to the Simferopol-Sevastopol railway 16 kilometres (9.9 mi) north of the target. At the end of the spur, they built four semi-circular tracks especially for the Gustav to traverse. Outer tracks were required for the cranes that assembled Gustav.

The siege of Sevastopol was the gun's first combat test. 4,000 men and five weeks were needed to get the gun into firing position; 500 men were needed to fire it. Installation began in early May, and by 5 June the gun was ready to fire. The following targets were engaged:

Date	Engagement
5 June	Coastal guns at a range of 25,000 m. Eight shells fired
5 June	Fort Stalin. Six shells fired.
6 June	Fort Molotov. Seven shells fired.
6 June	"White Cliff" also known as "Ammunition Mountain": an undersea ammunition magazine in Severnaya ("Northern") Bay. The magazine was sited 30 metres under the sea with at least 10 metres of concrete protection. After nine shells were fired, the magazine was ruined and one of the boats in the bay sunk.
7 June	Firing in support of an infantry attack on Südwestspitze, an outlying fortification. Seven shells fired.
11 June	Fort Siberia knocked out of action. Five shells fired.
17 June	Maxim Gorky Fortresses bombarded. Five shells fired.

By the end of the siege on 4 July the city of Sevastopol lay in ruins, and 30,000 tons of artillery ammunition had been fired. Gustav had fired 47 rounds and worn out its original barrel, which had already fired around 250 rounds during testing and development. The gun was fitted with the spare barrel and the original was sent back to Krupp's factory in Essen for relining.

The gun was then dismantled and moved to the northern part of the Eastern Front, where an attack was planned on Leningrad. The gun was placed 30 km (18.6 mi) from the city near the railway station of Taytsy. The gun was fully operational when the attack was cancelled. The gun then spent the winter of 1942/43 near Leningrad.

=== Dora ===
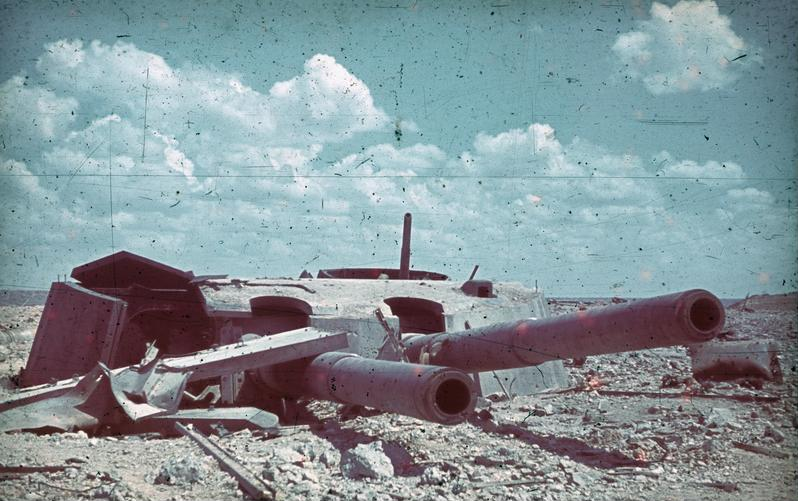
Maxim Gorky I, a fort knocked out of action by five 800 mm shells on 17 June 1942

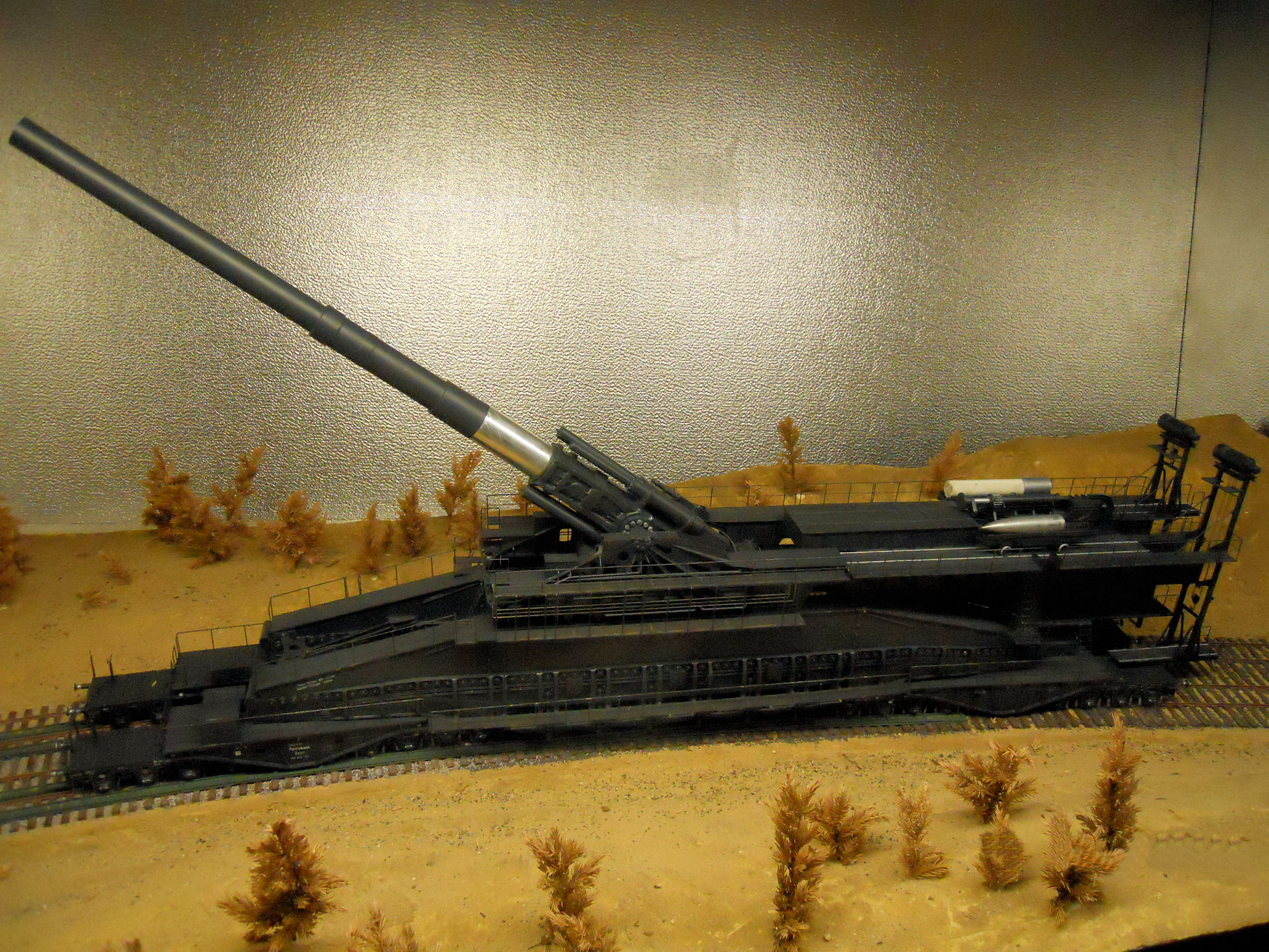
Model in the Militärhistorisches Museum der Bundeswehr

Dora is considered by some to be a secondary gustav. In reality many sources state it as a "Nickname". There is no proof of a second Gustav having been made.

=== Langer Gustav ===
The Langer Gustav was a long cannon with 52 centimetre (20.5 in) calibre and a 43-metre barrel. It was intended to fire super-long-range rocket projectiles weighing 680 kilograms to a range of 190 kilometres (118 mi). This gave it the range to hit London from Calais, France. It was never completed after being damaged during construction by one of the many RAF bombing raids on Essen.

== Postwar whereabouts ==
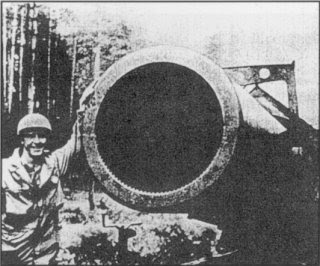
US soldier with 800mm gun barrel

American troops conduct an inspection of Schwerer Gustav, north of Auerbach, Germany, 22 April 1945

On 14 April 1945, one day before the arrival of US troops, Schwerer Gustav was destroyed to prevent its capture. On 22 April 1945, its ruins were discovered in a forest 15 kilometres (9.3 mi) north of Auerbach and about 50 kilometres (31 mi) southwest of Chemnitz. In summer 1945 Schwerer Gustav was studied by Soviet specialists and in autumn of the same year was transferred to Merseburg, where the Soviets were gathering German material.

In March 1945, Dora was transferred to Grafenwöhr and was destroyed on 19 April 1945. The debris was discovered by American troops sometime after the discovery of Schwerer Gustav's ruins. The debris was scrapped in the 1950s.

Part of the third (52 centimetre) gun was found after the war in the Krupp production facilities in Essen.

The world's largest "Dora ensemble" is located in the Bundeswehr Military History Museum in Dresden.

== Ammunition ==
	High explosive	Armour piercing
Length		3.6 m (11 ft 10 in)
Weight	4,800 kg (10,600 lb)	7,100 kg (15,700 lb)
Muzzle velocity	820 m/s (2,700 ft/s)	720 m/s (2,400 ft/s)
Maximum range	48 km (30 mi)	38 km (24 mi)
Explosive weight	700 kg (1,500 lb)	250 kg (550 lb)
Effect	Crater size: 39 ft (12 m) wide 39 ft (12 m) deep in compacted earth	Penetration: 7 m (23 ft) of concrete at maximum elevation (beyond that available during combat) with a special charge.
Notes	The gun fired a rudimentary high explosive round which was similar in design to most of German HE rounds at the time.	The main body was made of chrome-nickel steel, fitted with an aluminum alloy ballistic nose cone.

== See also ==
- Karl-Gerät
- Leopold railway gun
- Large-calibre artillery
- List of the largest cannon by caliber
- M65 atomic cannon
- Paris Gun
- Project Babylon
- Sturmtiger
- V-3 cannon
- Landkreuzer P. 1500 Monster
