= Talvisota: Icy Hell =

2007 video game

- Developer(s): Blitzfront Game Studio
- Publisher(s): CIS: Nival Interactive; FIN: Blitzfront Game Studio
- Engine: Enigma engine
- Platform(s): Windows
- Release: CIS: November 16, 2007; FIN: October 2, 2008
- Genre(s): Real-time tactics, educational game
- Mode(s): Single-player

Talvisota: Icy Hell (Russian "Talvisota: Ледяной ад") is a real-time tactics and educational computer game, developed by the international developer group Blitzfront Game Studio and is based on the events of the Winter War (Finnish: talvisota) conflict of 1939–1940 between Finland and the Soviet Union. The game is built-up upon Nival Interactive's Enigma Engine that was used in the Blitzkrieg game and is a fully stand-alone product.

The Finnish Board of Film Classification determined that Talvisota: Icy Hell is both a real-time strategy and an educational game.

== Game features ==
- Two long campaigns for Soviet and Finnish sides.
- Historical accuracy.
- Based on real political and historical events before and during the Winter War.
- Historical encyclopedia and archives videos.
- Molotov cocktails, soldiers speaking Russian and Finnish, authentic battle-front reports, airplanes, skiing troops, satchel charges, flamethrower tanks, and experimental units.

== Development history ==
The game's development was started by the Russian language online community, which consisted of people from different countries that were interested in military history and historical games. In 2004 they started wondering why nobody had made a game about the Winter War, a highly interesting war conflict, although somewhat unknown to the public. They decided to make the game themselves.

Because of various publishing problems, the game wasn't released for a long time despite development being completely finished. At the end of 2007 the game was finally released in CIS countries in Russian. A year later, at the end of 2008, the game was released in Finland in English.

== Critical reception ==
The game received generally positive reviews from game critics. Finland's main website for historians reviewed the game from historical and cultural perspectives, and their opinion was generally positive.

There were some negative opinions as well. For example, Finnish Captain Olli Ovaska said that the game claimed that the Finnish military attacked the USSR on the first day of the war, but according to the game developers, Olli Ovaska misunderstood something as they never claimed such a thing.

However content within the game itself has the player recreating a version of the Shelling of Mainila as a mission for the Soviets defending against Finnish aggression - with the events being presented as being as historically accurate as any other mission in the game, with no text in the mission or its briefing stating that they are fictional. The game's official Russian language website recounts this event as a historic fact (a page which is missing from the Finnish language version of the site, but they have a unique page defending the game's historical accuracy which is not present on the Russian portal), which support Olli Ovaska's claims that the game promotes the Shelling of Mainila as being a Finnish act of aggression, and not a false flag incident carried out by the Soviets.
