= Skafandr =

Russian band

Skafandr (Cyrillic: Скафандр) is a popular Russian band playing in the self-definite "metal-dub" style. Skafandr was formed in 1998 by Eugeniy Rybnikov, Yuriy Vitel, and Kirill Soloviyov in Saint Petersburg. Until 2001 the band was giving concerts with Anna Stolyarova's vocals, but since then focused on instrumental music only.

With the band's permission, several tracks from its second CD have been used as the soundtrack for animated shorts on Mult.ru - home of Masyanya.

== Members ==
- Eugeniy Rybnikov (Евгений Рыбников) - Guitar
- Yuriy Vitel (Юрий Витель) - Bass
- Kirill Soloviyov (Кирилл Соловьев) - drums
- Igor Rusinovich (Игорь Русинович) - Guitar

== Discography ==
=== Albums ===
- EP 8-812 (with Anna Stolyarova) — 2001
- EP Навстречу Солнцу и Свету (Towards The Sun and The Light) — 2002
- EP "Эпизод 3: Марш Красных Раскрепощенных Роботов По Планете Марс (Episode III: The March of Red Emancipated Robots Over Planet Mars) — 2003
- LP Марш Красных Роботов(The March of Red Robots) — 2004
- LP Навстречу Солнцу И Свету — 2005
- LP Kill Voice — 2006
- LP Тяжелый Шар Земной — 2007
- LP Glaz — 2012

=== Video games ===
- Stalingrad (2005 video game)
