= Puchkov =

Surname

Puchkov (Russian: Пучков, from пучок meaning bundle, beam) is a Russian masculine surname, its feminine counterpart is Puchkova. Notable people with the surname include:

- Aleksandr Puchkov (1957-2024), retired male hurdler and Olympic bronze medallist
- Aleksei Puchkov (born 1982), Russian professional football player
- Dmitry Puchkov (born 1961), English-to-Russian movie and video game translator, script-writer, and author
- Ganna Pushkova-Areshka (born 1978), Belarusian sprint canoeist
- Nikolai Puchkov (1930–2005), ice hockey player who played in the Soviet Hockey League
- Olga Puchkova (born 1987), Russian tennis player and model
- Serhiy Puchkov (born 1962), former midfielder, currently head-coach of SC Tavriya Simferopol in the Ukrainian Premier League
