= Stalingrad (2005 video game) =

- Cover art
- Developer(s): DTF Games
- Publisher(s): BlackBean Games; 1C Games
- Designer(s): Alexander Fedorov; Petr Prohorenko; Maxim Maslov; Evgeny Lazutkin; Vasily Stepanenko
- Composer(s): Skafandr
- Engine: Enigma engine
- Platform(s): Microsoft Windows
- Release: EU: March 2005
- Genre(s): Real-time tactics
- Mode(s): Single-player

Stalingrad (Russian: Сталинград, also known as Great Battles of WWII: Stalingrad) is a 2005 real-time tactics video game developed by Russian studio DTF Games for Microsoft Windows. The game is built-up upon Nival Interactive's Enigma Engine that was used in the Blitzkrieg game and is a fully stand-alone product.

== Setting ==
Stalingrad is set during Operation Barbarossa, the invasion of the Soviet Union by Nazi Germany in World War II, and is based around the Battle of Stalingrad between summer 1942 and early 1943. The game features two single-player campaigns: one as the Wehrmacht 6th Army of Nazi Germany as it invaded and captured the city of Stalingrad, and one as the Red Army of the Soviet Union as it re-captured the city and destroyed the 6th Army.

== Gameplay ==
The game uses a point and click system for the player to direct unit actions, such as movement and deployment. Unlike real-time strategy games which are similar in design, Stalingrad only allows the player to command pre-existing units already placed on the map - units lost cannot be replaced, as the game does not have a unit creation or base building system. The player must achieve predetermined objectives using their limited units to successfully accomplish a mission.

In total there are 36 missions, including 7 bonus missions that are unlocked if the player fulfils certain objectives in preceding levels. The maps used in the campaigns are reproduced from historical tactical maps and aerial photography taken of the Stalingrad area during the period that the campaign covers.

== Reception ==
Stalingrad received largely positive reviews, holding an average score of 73% at GameSpot and 60.00% at GameRankings.
