= Blitzkrieg 2 =

2005 video game

- Developer: Nival Interactive
- Publishers: RU: 1C Company; NA/PAL: CDV Software
- Series: Blitzkrieg
- Platform: Windows
- Release: RU: September 23, 2005; NA: September 28, 2005; UK: October 14, 2005; AU: October 31, 2005
- Genre: Real-time tactics
- Modes: Single-player, multiplayer

Blitzkrieg 2 (Russian: Блицкриг II) is a real-time tactics computer game based on the events of World War II. The game is an evolution of its predecessor Blitzkrieg and is the second title in the Blitzkrieg series. The game takes place in North Africa, the Pacific and Europe, and features the 6 different factions portrayed in the game that fought in their battle respective grounds during the war.

== Gameplay ==
As its predecessor and the similar Sudden Strike games, Blitzkrieg 2 focuses on the battles of World War II rather than real-time strategy aspects like base building and resource extraction. The game features many new features and units over its predecessor; the graphics engine is upgraded, allowing for full 3D and the game features over 250 units compared to Blitzkrieg's 200. In Blitzkrieg 2, the players can choose from three separate campaigns: The Nazi German Campaign, the American Campaign, and the Soviet Campaign, each divided into four distinct chapters. The German campaign begins in France, 1940, where the player is put in command of German offensive forces in an effort to conquer France. Here, they may use the signature Blitzkrieg strategy. The second chapter is set in the North Africa Campaign, which ends with the capture of Tobruk by Axis forces. The third is in the Soviet Union, during Case Blue. The fourth chapter is staged in the Ardennes during the Battle of the Bulge, 1944. The American campaign has its first 3 chapters in the Pacific theater, where the players lead your forces against the IJA (Imperial Japanese Army) and IJN (Imperial Japanese Navy) in a number of missions beginning shortly after the attack on Pearl Harbor. The final chapter of the American campaign is set in the German Ruhr in 1945, during the invasion of Germany. The Soviet Campaign begins shortly after Operation Barbarossa, going through the 5 years of the war against Germany eventually ending with the Soviet victory at the Battle of Berlin. At the end of each campaign, a short cinematic plays.

The game contains seven factions: Germany, Soviet Union, United Kingdom, Japan, United States, Kingdom of Italy, and France.

== Reception ==
Blitzkrieg

Aggregate scores
Aggregator	Score
GameRankings	77%
Metacritic	75/100

Review scores
Publication	Score
1Up.com	C+
GameSpy	2.5/5
IGN	8.4/10
Absolute Games	73%

The game received positive reviews before release, yet never achieved the same long lived success its predecessor had achieved, even though two expansions and numerous spin-offs were made.

== Add-ons ==
The base game Blitzkrieg 2 was released together with both add-ons as Blitzkrieg 2 Anthology:

- Blitzkrieg 2: Fall Of The Reich: the first expansion pack, it was released in Russia and Germany in Autumn 2006, and in the EU and the US in January–February 2007. It was subtitled as Retribution in Russia, and The Last Stand in Germany.
- Blitzkrieg 2: Liberation: the second expansion pack was released in January 2007 in Russia and on October 12 in the EU. It was developed by MindLink Studio Ltd.

== Spin-off games ==
- Frontline: Fields of Thunder: this spin-off from Nival Interactive and N-Game Studios was released in April 2007 (probably initially in the Russian market at end of 2006) at a retail price of US$29.99. MobyGames entry indicates the game was on sale in USA and Germany in March 2007, and Australia in April. It was released by N-Game Studios. It is also known as Great battles: Kursk Bulge in the Russian market.
- Great Battles: Battle of Tobruk, by the company Arise Games, was one of various other spin-offs of which some were released exclusively in Russia, Nival Interactive's home country. Battle of Tobruk was released in February 2007.
- Great Battles: Landing in Normandy, by the company Arise Inc., was another unofficial spin-off game in Arise's Great Battles lineup. It was released in April 2007.
- Great Battles: Stalingrad, by a different company N-Game Studios, was yet another iteration in the unofficial Great Battles lineup built on the Blitzkrieg 2 engine. It was released in August 2007. It is unrelated to the Stalingrad spin-off game built on the Blitzkrieg engine and released in 2005.

=== Non-WWII based ===
- Stalin vs. Martians (2009) by a consortium of three developers - Black Wing Foundation, Dreamlore, & N-Game Studios. Using the Blitzkrieg 2 engine, it was a parody of WWII real-time strategy titles, with the story pitting the Soviets against fictional Martians in Siberia. It was released in April 2009. It was sold on Steam at the same time, but it has since been delisted.
- X-Team: Day of Freedom by Ukrainian developers N-Game Studios. It is a Blitzkrieg 2 engine based game with a sci-fi setting where the player organizes an X-Team squad to defend the Earth against an alien civilization. It is a classic mix of role-playing game and strategy, inspired by Fallout, Command & Conquer, Rage of Mages and Dungeon Siege. It was released in retail in May 2008, and re-released on Steam in December 2019.

== Source code ==
In September 2025 Nival published game's source code on GitHub under a special non-commercial license.
