= Little David =

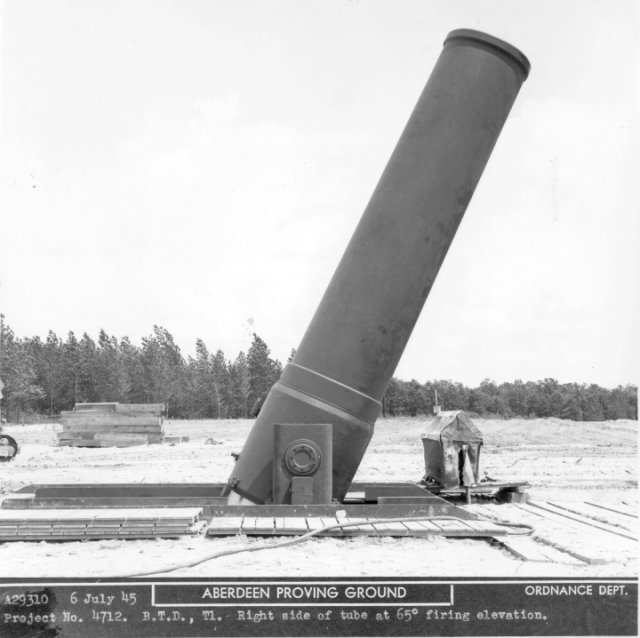
- Little David at the Aberdeen Proving Ground
- Type: Heavy mortar
- Place of origin: United States

Service history
- In service: Testing only
- Used by: United States

Specifications
- Mass: 173,000 pounds (77 long tons; 87 short tons)
- Barrel length: 22 feet (6.7 m)
- Shell: 3,650 pounds (1,656 kg)
- Caliber: 36 inches (914 mm)
- Barrels: 1
- Muzzle velocity: 1,250 feet per second (381 m/s)
- Maximum firing range: 9,500 yards (8.7 km)
- Feed system: Muzzle loading

Little David was the nickname of an American 36-inch (910 mm) caliber mortar designed and tested between 1944 and 1945 to breach the Siegfried Line. It was also used for test-firing aerial bombs during the final years of World War II. With the same calibre as the British Mallet's Mortar which was constructed in May 1857, it is one of the largest-calibre guns ever built, having a larger calibre than both of Germany's Schwerer Gustav and Dora which were 31.5-inch (800 mm) railway guns.

== History ==
The mortar was developed as an extension of a previous proposal to destroy heavy concrete fortifications such as the Siegfried Line with massive plastic explosive charges delivered by rocket or bomb. During a discussion between representatives of the Ballistic Research Laboratory and the Office of the Chief of Ordnance it was suggested that instead of dropping such a charge from an airplane, it could be fired from a mortar. Development began of a 914 mm (36.0 in) siege mortar firing a 3,650 lb (1,660 kg) shell. The mortar's base was a large steel box that was placed below ground, with its top flush with the surrounding surface, allowing the mortar's muzzle to be lowered horizontal for loading at ground level.

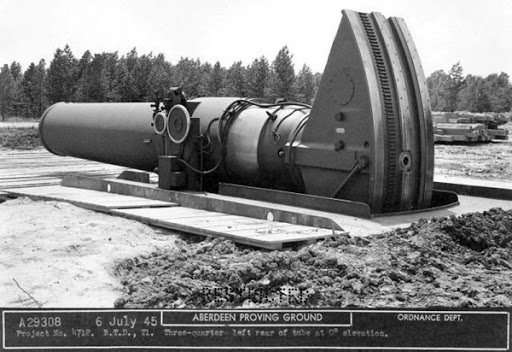
"Little David" 36 inch (914 mm) mortar emplacement at Aberdeen Proving Ground, Maryland.

After the Siegfried Line was breached with conventional forces, Little David was instead considered for use against the extremely strong fortifications during the expected invasion of Japan. The decision was made to test for this purpose, but the end of the war also removed all need for Little David to be deployed. The mortar was able to be transported as a two-piece mobile unit, consisting of the 80,000 lb (36,000 kg) barrel and the 93,000 lb (42,000 kg) base transported by two M25 tractors. In addition to the two main loads, the Little David unit would also include a bulldozer and crane with bucket to dig the emplacement for the mortar's base.

The huge mortar could be ready to fire in 12 hours. The largest (800 mm) known German artillery weapons were hauled on 25 railway cars and required three weeks to put in firing position, but had a longer range of 47 km (29 mi) compared to the 9.7 km (6.0 mi) of Little David.

Little David was by calibre one of the largest artillery pieces ever produced, although Schwerer Gustav and Dora fired a much heavier shell. Little David's overall effectiveness would have been questionable because of its limited range and accuracy. When Japan surrendered, the invasion became unnecessary, and Little David (still in its trial phase) never saw combat.

With the closure of the Aberdeen Proving Ground Ordnance Museum and relocation to Fort Lee, the status of Little David was previously in doubt as only restored pieces made the transfer.

As of September 2023 Little David has been moved to the new museum location and is slated to undergo restoration prior to display.

July 1945 film footage of mortar setup and firing

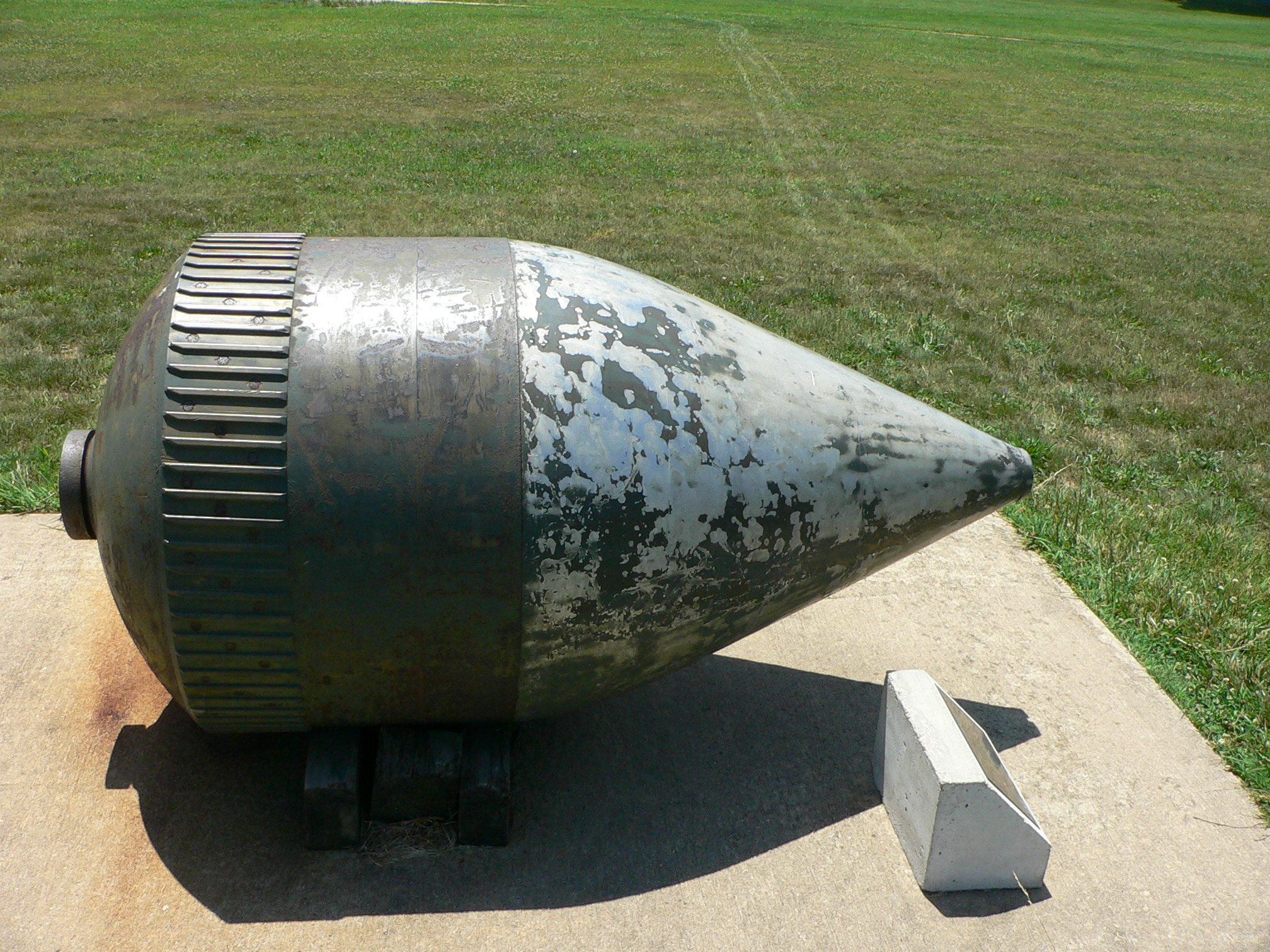
Shell at the United States Army Ordnance Museum, Maryland

== See also ==
- List of heavy mortars
- List of the largest cannon by caliber
