= Mallet's Mortar =

British artillery weapon

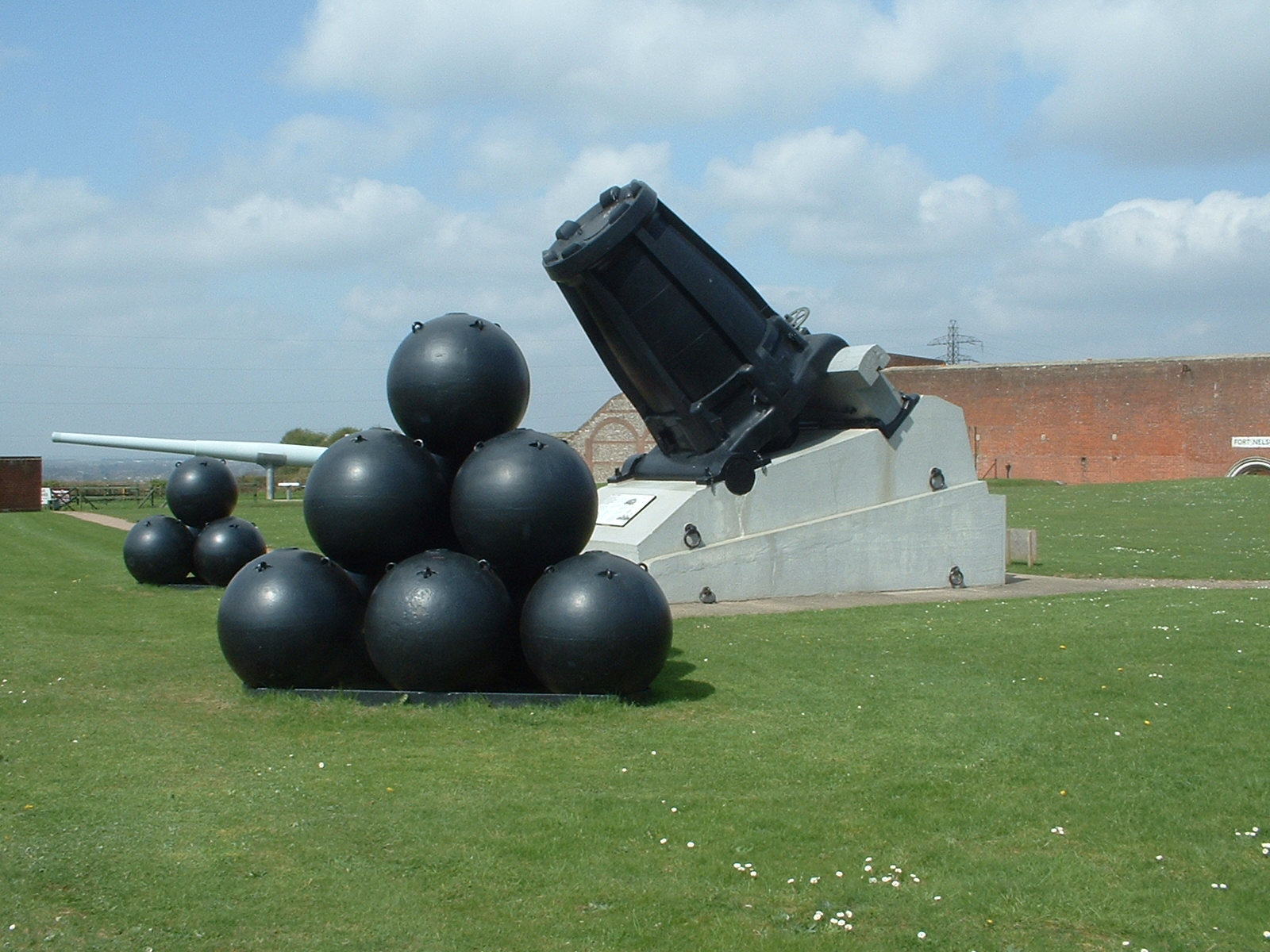
- Mallet's Mortar outside Royal Armouries Fort Nelson
- Type: Siege mortar
- Place of origin: United Kingdom

Service history
- Wars: Unused

Production history
- Designer: Robert Mallet
- Manufacturer: C. J. Mare ironworks, Blackwall (bankrupted), Completed by Horsfall & Co and Fawcett, Preston & Co, both of Liverpool.
- Produced: March 1857
- No. built: 2

Specifications
- Mass: 42 long tons (43 t; 47 short tons)
- Length: 11 feet (3.4 m)
- Cartridge weight: 2,800 pounds (1,270 kg)
- Calibre: 36 in (914 mm)
- Effective firing range: 1.5 miles (2.4 km) with 2,400 lb (1,100 kg) shell

Mallet's Mortar was a 19th-century British shell-firing mortar built for the Crimean War, but never used in combat. The mortar was designed by Robert Mallet and was constructed in sections so that it could be more easily transported. Mallet made his design public in 1854. There was little response from the government until Mallet wrote to the Prime Minister Lord Palmerston in March 1855. Palmerston was taken with the idea and instructed the Board of Ordnance to arrange for the construction of two mortars of Mallet's design.

Thames Ironworks and Shipbuilding Company won the contract at a price of £4,300 per mortar. The company's bankruptcy resulted in the work being divided among three firms which managed to deliver the mortars in May 1857. Testing began on 19 October 1857 with further testing taking place on 18 December 1857, 21 July 1858, and 28 July 1858. Each test was brought to an end by damage to the mortar. A total of 19 rounds were fired with a rate of about four shells an hour being achieved. Shell weight was between 2,352 and 2,940 pounds (1,067 and 1,334 kg). In testing with an 80-pound (36 kg) charge it fired the lighter shell a distance of 2,759 yards (2,523 m) with a flight time of 23 seconds.

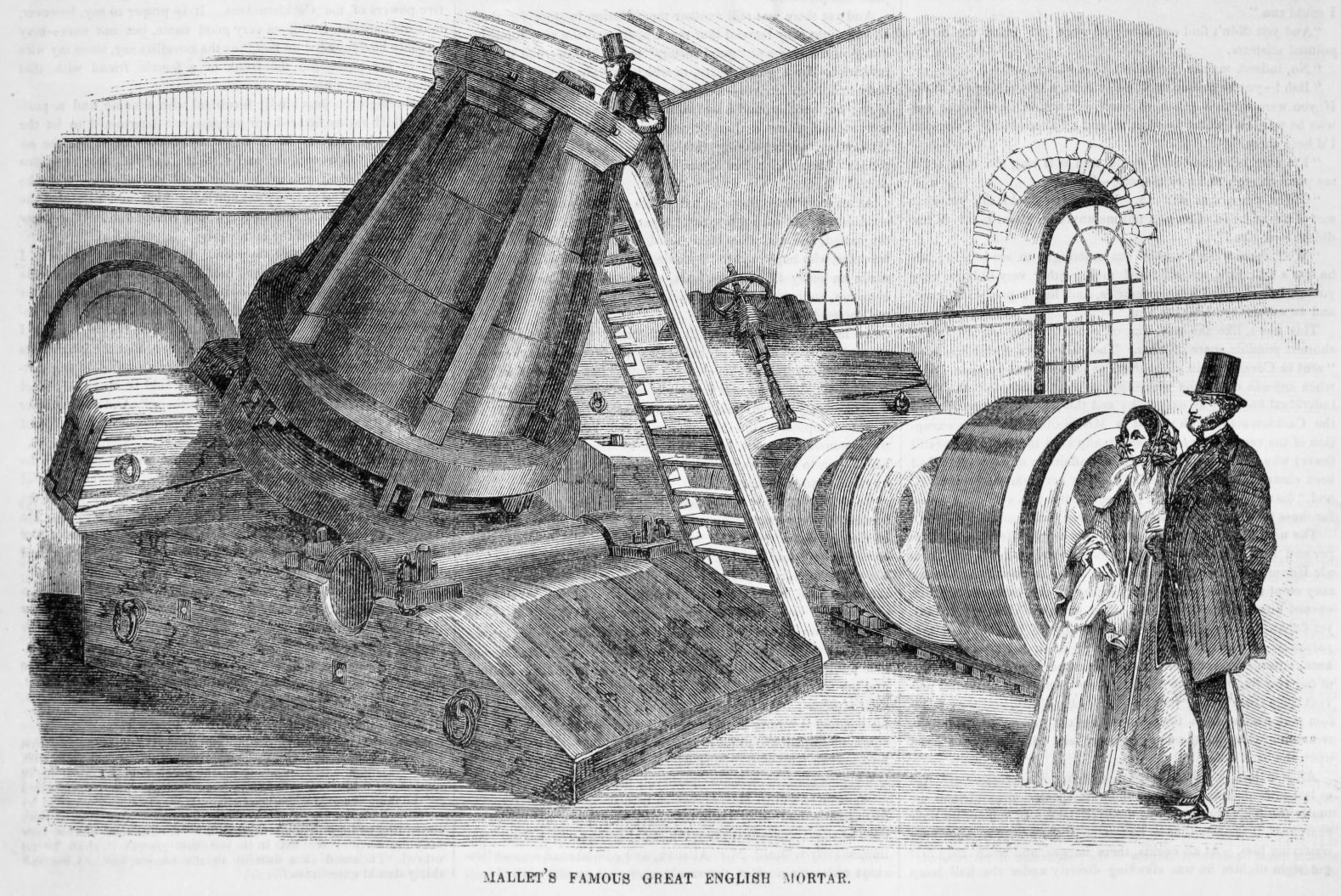
Mallet's 36-inch mortar

Both mortars are in the collection of the Royal Armouries, the UK's national museum of arms and armour. The gun used for testing is on loan to the Royal Artillery and is located on the corner of Greenhill Terrace and Repository Road (51°29′13″N 0°03′23″E), opposite the entrance to the British Army's Royal Artillery Barracks in Woolwich, while the unfired gun is on display outside the Royal Armouries Fort Nelson near Portsmouth.

== See also ==
- List of heavy mortars
- List of the largest cannon by caliber
