= List of real-time tactics video games =

This is a comprehensive index of commercial real-time tactics games for all platforms, sorted chronologically. Information regarding date of release, developer, publisher, platform and notability is provided when available. The table can be sorted by clicking on the small boxes next to the column headings.

== Legend ==
Video game platforms
| 3DO | 3DO | AMI | Amiga | APPII | Apple II |
| Arcade | Arcade video game | ATR | Atari 8-bit computers | ATRST | Atari ST, Atari Falcon |
| C64 | Commodore 64 | CPC | Amstrad CPC | DC | Dreamcast |
| DOS | PC DOS / MS-DOS, Windows 3.X | DROID | Android | DS | Nintendo DS, DSiWare, iQue DS |
| FM7 | FM-7 | GB | Game Boy | GBA | Game Boy Advance, iQue GBA |
| GBC | Game Boy Color | GCN | GameCube | GEN | Genesis / Mega Drive |
| IBM | IBM PC, IBM PC compatible | iOS | iOS, iPhone, iPod, iPadOS, iPad, visionOS, Apple Vision Pro | LIN | Linux, SteamOS |
| MAC | Classic Mac OS, 2001 and before | MOBI | Mobile phone | MSX | MSX |
| NES | Nintendo Entertainment System / Famicom | NX | (replace with NS) | ODY2 | Magnavox Odyssey 2 |
| OSX | macOS | PC60 | PC-6000 series | PC88 | PC-8800 series |
| PC98 | PC-9800 series | PS1 | PlayStation 1 | PS2 | PlayStation 2 |
| PS3 | PlayStation 3 | PS4 | PlayStation 4 | PS5 | PlayStation 5 |
| PSP | PlayStation Portable | SAT | Sega Saturn | TRS80 | TRS-80 |
| Wii | Wii, WiiWare, Wii Virtual Console | WIN | Windows, all versions Windows 95 and up | X1 | Sharp X1 |
| X360 | (replace with XB360) | XB | Xbox, Xbox Live Arcade | XOne | (replace with XBO) |
| XSX/S | (replace with XBX/S) | ZX | ZX Spectrum | | |

Types of releases
| Compilation | A compilation, anthology or collection of several titles, usually (but not always) belonging to the same series |
| Early access | A game launched in early access is unfinished and thus might contain bugs and glitches or have some of the content missing |
| Episodic | An episodic video game that is released in batches over a period of time |
| Expansion | A large-scale DLC to an already existing game that adds new story, areas and additions and/or changes to the game's mechanics |
| Full release | A full release of a game that launched in early access first |
| Limited | A special release (often called "Limited" or "Collector's Edition") with bonus collector's material. Often provided to people who pre-order a game |
| Port | The game first appeared on a different platform and a port was made. The game is like the original, with few or no differences |
| Remake | The game is an enhanced remake of an original, made using a new engine and/or assets and thus containing completely new sound, graphics and possibly changes to the story and/or gameplay |
| Remaster | The game is a remaster of an original, released on the same or different platform, with (usually minor) changes to graphics, sound and/or gameplay |
| Rerelease | The game was re-released on the same platform with no or only minor changes |

== List ==
| Year | Title | Developer | Archetype | Setting | Platform | Notes |
|---|---|---|---|---|---|---|
| 1979 | War of Nerves! Aka. Battlefield (UK) | Ed Averett | Sci-fi, Military | Forests | ODY2 | Capture enemy general in-game. Can fix units. |
| 1980 | Space Tactics | Sega | Futuristic | Military bases | Arcade | Tactical shooter. |
| 1981 | Centurion | APX | Historical | Ancient Rome | ATR | Uses an hexagonal board. |
| 1982 | Cytron Masters | Ozark Softscape | Futuristic | Earth-like planet | ATR, APPII | |
| 1982 | Legionnaire | Avalon Hill | Historical | Roman Empire | ATR | |
| 1983 | Bokosuka Wars | Koji Sumii | Fantasy | High fantasy | X1, MSX, NES, PC60, PC88, PC98, FM7, Wii, WIN | TRPG; Reverse tower defense. Also released on Hitachi MB-S1 (1985) & DoJa profile (2004) on DoCoMo's i-Mode mobile internet service. |
| 1983 | Stonkers | Imagine | Alternate history | Northern Europe, Coastline | ZX | Title mimics 20th century armoured warfare & its sole map mimics the coastline of Northern Europe. |
| 1984 | New Bokosuka Wars | Koji Sumii | Fantasy | High fantasy | X1 | TRPG; Reverse tower defense. |
| 1984 | The Ancient Art of War | Evryware | Historical, Mythological | | APPII, DOS, MAC, TRS80, PC88, PC98, AMI, ATRST, CPC | |
| 1985 | Arena | Roger Lees, Steve Hughes | Retro style, sci-fi | England, Sweden | ZX, CPC | Command a small tank fleet in medieval combat in near future. |
| 1986 | Hacker II: The Doomsday Papers | Activision | Cold War era | Siberia | C64, IBM, ATRST, APPII, AMI, MAC, ZX, CPC | Sequel to spy adventure, Hacker. Hack a facility with a robot. |
| 1987 | The Ancient Art of War at Sea | Evryware | Historical, Mythological | Naval warfare | DOS, MAC, APPII, PC98 | |
| 1988 | Energy Warrior | Binary Design | Futuristic | Sci-fi | C64 | Scrolling shooter. |
| 1988 | J.R.R. Tolkien's War in Middle-earth | Melbourne House | Fantasy | The Lord of the Rings series | | |
| 1988 | Modem Wars | Ozark | Futuristic | | C64, DOS | |
| 1988 | Napoleon Senki | Irem | Historical | Napoleonic Wars | NES | |
| 1988 | Silver Ghost | Kure Software Koubou | Fantasy | High fantasy | PC88 | Tactical role-playing game. |
| 1989 | Carrier Command | Realtime | Sci-fi | Island chain | AMI, C64, CPC, ATRST, ZX | Vehicle simulation game. |
| 1989 | Harpoon | Three-Sixty | Historical | Cold War era | DOS | |
| 1989 | M1 Tank Platoon | MicroProse | Modern | Central Europe | DOS, AMI, ATRST | Series debuts. |
| 1989 | North and South | Infogrames Europe SA | Historical | American Civil War | AMI, ATRST, C64, DOS, CPC, NES, ZX, MSX, WIN | Innovative title preceded the similar, first Total War game by 11 years! |
| 1990 | BattleTech: The Crescent Hawk's Revenge | Westwood | Futuristic | BattleTech | DOS | Sequel to BattleTech: The Crescent Hawk's Inception, which was turn-based. |
| 1991 | Battle of Kingdom | Lenar Co., Ltd. | Fantasy | High fantasy | GB | Board game; side-scrolling real-time tactics. Got a 2017 EN patch. |
| 1992 | Tegel's Mercenaries | Mindcraft | Futuristic, Sci-fi | Outer space, Exoplanets | DOS | |
| 1993 | Cannon Fodder | Sensible | Alternate history, Modern | Earth | | Series debuts. Black comedy title seems to depict 20th century armoured warfare. |
| 1993 | Fields of Glory | MicroProse | Historical | Napoleonic Wars | DOS, AMI | |
| 1993 | General Chaos | Game Refuge Inc. | Alternate present | Fictional countries | GEN | Satirical title seems to depict 20th century small unit tactics. |
| 1993 | SEAL Team | Electronic Arts | Historical | Vietnam War | DOS | |
| 1993 | Space Hulk | EA | Futuristic | Warhammer 40,000 | DOS, AMI, PC98 | FPS hybrid. |
| 1993 | Strike Squad | Mindcraft | Futuristic, Sci-fi | Outer space, Exoplanets | DOS | Sequel to Tegel's Mercenaries. Also has a turn-based option. |
| 1993 | Syndicate | Bullfrog | Futuristic | Dystopia | | Series debuts. |
| 1993 | Syndicate: American Revolt | Bullfrog | Futuristic | Dystopia | DOS, AMI | Expansion to Syndicate. |
| 1994 | Battle Bugs | Epyx | Fantastical | Your kitchen floor | DOS, PS1, WIN | Semi real-time. |
| 1994 | Cannon Fodder 2 | Sensible | Alternate history, Modern, Sci-fi | Earth, Outer space, Exoplanet | DOS, AMI, WIN, MAC, LIN | Sequel to Cannon Fodder. |
| 1995 | Breach 3 | Omnitrend | Futuristic | Alien invasion | DOS | Sequel to Breach and Breach 2, which were turn-based. |
| 1995 | Godzilla: Rettoushinkan | Scarab | Sci-fi | Heisei-Era Japan | SAT | Based upon the 1995 film Godzilla vs. Destoroyah. |
| 1995 | Space Hulk: Vengeance of the Blood Angels | Key Game, Krisalis | Futuristic | Warhammer 40,000 | 3DO, PS1, SAT, WIN | Sequel to Space Hulk. |
| 1995 | Warhammer: Shadow of the Horned Rat | Mindscape | Fantastical | Warhammer Fantasy Battle | WIN, PS1 | Series debuts. |
| 1996 | Age of Sail | TalonSoft | Historical | Elizabethan Era | WIN | Series debuts. |
| 1996 | Close Combat | Atomic | Historical | World War II | WIN | Series debuts. |
| 1996 | Colony Wars 2492 | Digital X-citement | Futuristic | Outer space | DOS | |
| 1996 | Deadline | Psygnosis | Modern | Earth-like planet | DOS | Innovative progenitor to the SWAT, Rainbow Six & Commandos franchises. |
| 1996 | Gender Wars | SCi | Futuristic | Dystopia | DOS | |
| 1996 | Syndicate Wars | Bullfrog | Futuristic | Dystopia | DOS, PS1 | Sequel to Syndicate. |
| 1997 | 7th Legion | Epic, Vision | Futuristic | Dystopia | WIN | |
| 1997 | Akte Europa | Digital X-citement | Futuristic | Outer space | WIN | |
| 1997 | Close Combat: A Bridge Too Far | Atomic | Historical | World War II | WIN | Sequel to Close Combat. |
| 1997 | Conquest Earth | Data Design | Futuristic | Outer space | DOS, WIN, PS1 | |
| 1997 | Counter Action | NashiIgry | Historical | World War II | DOS | Predecessor to Sudden Strike. |
| 1997 | Imperium Galactica | Digital Reality | Futuristic | Outer Space | DOS | Series debuts. |
| 1997 | Lords of Magic | Impressions | Fantasy | High fantasy | WIN | Features a turn-based strategic layer and real-time tactical layer. |
| 1997 | Myth: The Fallen Lords | Bungie | Fantastical | High fantasy | WIN, MAC | Series debuts. |
| 1997 | Sid Meier's Gettysburg! | Firaxis | Historical | American Civil War | WIN | Series debuts. Features an "award winning" real-time tactical battle system. |
| 1997 | X-COM: Apocalypse | Mythos | Futuristic | Earth | DOS, WIN | Third game in the X-COM series. Can toggle between turn-based and real-time. The first two games in the series were turn-based. |
| 1998 | Army Men | The 3DO Company | Alternate History, Fantastical | Army men | WIN, GBC | Series debuts. |
| 1998 | Commandos: Behind Enemy Lines | Pyro | Historical | World War II | WIN | Stealth tactics. Series debuts. |
| 1998 | Enemy Infestation | Clockwork, Micro Forté | Futuristic | Exoplanet | WIN | |
| 1998 | Jane's Combat Simulations: Fleet Command | Sonalysts | Historical | Cold War era | WIN | |
| 1998 | Lords of Magic: Legends of Urak | Impressions | Fantasy | High Fantasy | WIN | Expansion to Lords of Magic. |
| 1998 | Lords of Magic: Special Edition | Impressions | Fantasy | High fantasy | WIN | Re-release of Lords of Magic and its expansion. |
| 1998 | M1 Tank Platoon II | MicroProse | Modern | | WIN | Sequel to M1 Tank Platoon. |
| 1998 | MechCommander | FASA | Futuristic | BattleTech | WIN | Series debuts. |
| 1998 | Myth II: Soulblighter | Bungie | Fantastical | High fantasy | WIN, MAC, LIN | Sequel to Myth: The Fallen Lords. |
| 1998 | Police Quest: SWAT 2 | Yosemite | Modern | L.A. | WIN | Sequel to Police Quest. |
| 1998 | Rage of Mages | Nival | Fantasy | High fantasy | WIN | RPG & real-time tactics. |
| 1998 | Sid Meier's Antietam! | Firaxis | Historical | American Civil War | WIN | Sequel to Sid Meier's Gettysburg!. |
| 1998 | Warhammer: Dark Omen | Mindscape | Fantastical | Warhammer Fantasy Battle | WIN, PS1 | Sequel to Warhammer: Shadow of the Horned Rat. |
| 1999 | Abomination: The Nemesis Project | Hothouse | Post-apocalyptic | US | WIN | |
| 1999 | Army Men II | The 3DO Company | Alternate History, Fantastical | Army men, Earth | WIN, GBC | Sequel to Army Men. |
| 1999 | Army Men: Toys in Space | The 3DO Company | Alternate History, Fantastical, Sci-Fi | Army men, Earth, Outer space | WIN | Sequel to Army Men II. |
| 1999 | Black Moon Chronicles | Cryo Interactive | Fantasy | High fantasy | WIN | Has TB campaign map. |
| 1999 | Close Combat III: The Russian Front | Atomic | Historical | World War II | WIN | Sequel to Close Combat: A Bridge Too Far. |
| 1999 | Close Combat: Battle of the Bulge | Atomic | Historical | World War II | WIN | Sequel to Close Combat III: The Russian Front. |
| 1999 | Commandos: Beyond the Call of Duty | Pyro | Historical | World War II | WIN | Stealth tactics. Expansion to Commandos: Behind Enemy Lines. |
| 1999 | Fighting Steel | SSI | Historical | World War II | WIN | |
| 1999 | Force 21 | Red Storm | Futuristic | | WIN, GBA | Set in Russia, Kazakhstan & China. |
| 1999 | Hatfields & McCoys | Lupine | Historical | Wild West | WIN | Comedy Western. |
| 1999 | Myth: The Total Codex | Bungie | Fantastical | High fantasy | WIN (Rerel) | Re-release of Myth: The Fallen Lords, Myth II: Soulblighter, the Myth II: Chimera scenario pack and many fan-created multiplayer maps. |
| 1999 | Myth II: Chimera | Bungie | Fantastical | High fantasy | WIN | Expansion to Myth II: Soulblighter. |
| 1999 | Rage of Mages II: Necromancer | Nival | Fantasy | High fantasy | WIN | Sequel to Rage of Mages. |
| 1999 | Shadow Company: Left For Dead | Sinister | Modern | Africa | WIN | Similar to the Jagged Alliance series. |
| 1999 | Star Trek: Starfleet Command | Quicksilver | Futuristic | Star Trek | WIN | Series debuts. |
| 2000 | Army Men: Air Tactics | The 3DO Company | Alternate History, Fantastical | Army men, Earth | WIN | |
| 2000 | Close Combat: Invasion: Normandy | Atomic | Historical | World War II | WIN | Sequel to Close Combat: Battle of the Bulge. |
| 2000 | Evil Islands: Curse of the Lost Soul | Nival | Fantasy | High fantasy | WIN | 3D sequel to Rage of Mages II: Necromancer. Added stealth elements. |
| 2000 | Ground Control | Massive | Post-apocalyptic | Earth | WIN | |
| 2000 | Imperium Galactica II: Alliances | Digital Reality | Futuristic | Outer Space | WIN | Sequel to Imperium Galactica. |
| 2000 | Invictus: In the Shadow of Olympus | Quicksilver | Fantastical | Greek mythology | WIN | |
| 2000 | Kessen | Koei | Historical | Feudal Japan | PS2 | Series debuts. |
| 2000 | Metal Fatigue | Zono | Futuristic | 3 faction mech war | WIN | Customizable Mech Units (Combots), with parts unique to all 3 factions. Maps set at orbit, surface and subterranean levels. |
| 2000 | Shogun: Total War | Creative Assembly | Historical | Feudal Japan | WIN | First game in the Total War series. Features a turn-based strategic layer and a real-time tactical layer. |
| 2000 | Starship Troopers: Terran Ascendancy | Blue Tongue | Futuristic | Heinlein | WIN | |
| 2000 | Star Trek: Starfleet Command II: Empires at War | Taldren | Futuristic | Star Trek | WIN | Sequel to Star Trek: Starfleet Command. |
| 2000 | Sudden Strike | Fireglow | Historical | World War II | WIN | Series debuts. |
| 2001 | Age of Sail II | TalonSoft | Historical | Napoleonic Era | WIN | Sequel to Age of Sail. |
| 2001 | Commandos 2: Men of Courage | Pyro | Historical | World War II | WIN, MAC, PS2, XB | Stealth tactics. Sequel to Commandos: Behind Enemy Lines. |
| 2001 | Desperados: Wanted Dead or Alive | Spellbound Entertainment | Historical | Wild West | WIN | Stealth tactics. |
| 2001 | Fallout Tactics: Brotherhood of Steel | Micro Forté | Post-apocalyptic | US | WIN | Has both turn-based and real-time modes. |
| 2001 | Green Berets | Take-Two | Historical | Vietnam War | WIN, MAC | Uses the Myth II: Soulblighter engine. |
| 2001 | Gundam Battle Online (FR wiki) | BEC | Military science fiction | Gundam franchise | DC | Has a semi-real time strategic layer & a real-time tactical layer. |
| 2001 | Gunlok | Rebellion Developments | Post-apocalyptic | Earth | WIN | Set at end of 21st century after AI takeover. |
| 2001 | Kessen II | Koei | Historical, fantastical | Three Kingdoms | PS2 | Sequel to Kessen. |
| 2001 | Kingdom Under Fire: A War of Heroes | Phantagram | Fantasy | High fantasy | WIN | Series debuts. |
| 2001 | MechCommander 2 | FASA | Futuristic | BattleTech | WIN | Sequel to MechCommander. |
| 2001 | Mega Man Battle Network | Capcom | Futuristic | Sci Fi | GBA | |
| 2001 | Myth III: The Wolf Age | MumboJumbo | Fantastical | High fantasy | WIN, MAC | Sequel to Myth II: Soulblighter. |
| 2001 | Original War | ALTAR | Modern, Prehistoric | Siberia, Alaska | WIN | Loosely based on the time travel, sci-fi novel The Last Day of Creation (1981). |
| 2001 | Star Trek: Away Team | Reflexive | Futuristic | Star Trek | WIN | |
| 2001 | Star Trek: Deep Space Nine: Dominion Wars | Gizmo | Futuristic | Star Trek | WIN | |
| 2001 | Star Trek: Starfleet Command: Orion Pirates | Taldren | Futuristic | Star Trek | WIN | Standalone expansion to Star Trek: Starfleet Command II: Empires at War. |
| 2001 | Sudden Strike: Forever | Fireglow | Historical | World War II | WIN | Expansion to Sudden Strike. |
| 2001 | S.W.I.N.E. | Stormregion | Fantastical, Modern | Low Fantasy, WWII based | WIN | First of the corporation. |
| 2001 | Takeda | Magitech | Historical | Feudal Japan | WIN | Series debuts. |
| 2001 | WarCommander | Independent Arts Software | Historical | World War II | WIN | |
| 2001 | Waterloo: Napoleon's Last Battle | Firaxis, BreakAway Games | Historical | Napoleonic Wars | WIN | Uses SM's Gettysburg!'s engine. |
| 2002 | Age of Sail II: Privateer's Bounty | Akella | Historical | Open sea | WIN | Expansion to Age of Sail II. |
| 2002 | Austerlitz: Napoleon's Greatest Victory | BreakAway | Historical | Napoleonic Wars | WIN | Uses SM's Gettysburg!'s modified engine. |
| 2002 | Freedom Force | Crave Entertainment | Comic retro | United States | WIN, OSX | RPG & RTS characteristics. |
| 2002 | G.I. Combat: Episode 1 - Battle of Normandy | Freedom | Historical | World War II | WIN | |
| 2002 | Hooligans: Storm Over Europe | DarXabre | Modern | European cities | WIN | |
| 2002 | Legion: The Legend of Excalibur | 7 Studios | Fantastical | Arthurian legends | PS2 | RTS & action RPG hybrid. |
| 2002 | Lost Kingdoms | FromSoftware | Fantastical | High fantasy | GCN | Card-based, RPG characteristics; & real-time battles. |
| 2002 | Medieval: Total War | Creative Assembly | Historical | Medieval Europe | WIN | Features a turn-based strategic layer and a real-time tactical layer. |
| 2002 | Platoon | Digital Reality | Historical | Vietnam War | WIN | Very poor reviews. |
| 2002 | Robin Hood: The Legend of Sherwood | Spellbound Entertainment | Fantastical | England | WIN, AMI, MAC, LIN | Stealth tactics. Based on the legend of Robin Hood. |
| 2002 | Soldiers of Anarchy | Silver Style | Post-apocalyptic | Earth | WIN | |
| 2002 | Star Trek: Starfleet Command III | Taldren | Futuristic | Star Trek | WIN | Sequel of Star Trek: Starfleet Command series. |
| 2002 | Sudden Strike 2 | Fireglow | Historical | World War II | WIN | Sequel to Sudden Strike. |
| 2002 | The Gladiators: Galactic Circus Games | Eugen | Futuristic, Sci-fi | Planetary system, Arena | WIN | Action RTS. |
| 2002 | World War II: Panzer Claws | Reality Pump Studios | Historical | World War II | WIN | |
| 2003 | Blitzkrieg | Nival | Historical | World War II | WIN | Series debuts. |
| 2003 | Chariots of War | Slitherine | Historical | Antiquity | WIN | |
| 2003 | Cold War Conflicts | Fireglow Games | Historical | Cold War era | WIN | |
| 2003 | Cold Zero: No Mercy (VI wiki) | Drago Entertainment | Modern | | WIN | |
| 2003 | Cold Zero: The Last Stand (RU wiki) | Drago Entertainment | Modern | | WIN | |
| 2003 | Commandos 3: Destination Berlin | Pyro | Historical | World War II | WIN | Stealth tactics. Sequel to Commandos 2: Men of Courage. |
| 2003 | Eric Young's Squad Assault: West Front | Freedom | Historical | World War II | WIN | |
| 2003 | History Channel: Crusades – Quest for Power, The | Zono | Historical | Crusades | WIN | |
| 2003 | Korea: Forgotten Conflict | Plastic Reality | Historical | Korean War | WIN | Stealth tactics. |
| 2003 | Nexagon: Deathmatch (a.k.a. Nexagon: The Pit) | Strategy First | Futuristic | Combat arena | WIN | A deathmatch game between player controlled squads of captive criminals. Mediocre reviews. |
| 2003 | Praetorians | Eidos | Historic | Ancient Rome | WIN | |
| 2003 | Rebels: Prison Escape | Philos Labs | Futuristic | Dystopia | WIN | |
| 2003 | UFO: Aftermath | ALTAR | Futuristic | Earth | WIN | Series debuts. Features "weak real-time tactical battles loosely connected by a shallow strategic shell." |
| 2003 | World War II: Frontline Command | Bitmap Bros. | Historical | World War II | WIN | |
| 2004 | Battle for Troy | Zono | Historical | Bronze Age | WIN | |
| 2004 | Blitzkrieg: Burning Horizon | Nival | Historical | World War II | WIN | Expansion to Blitzkrieg. |
| 2004 | Blitzkrieg: Rolling Thunder | Nival | Historical | World War II | WIN | Expansion to Blitzkrieg. |
| 2004 | Close Combat: Marines | Atomic | Modern | | WIN | Uses the Close Combat engine as a training tool for the US Marines. |
| 2004 | Codename: Panzers | StormRegion | Historical | World War II | WIN | Series debuts. |
| 2004 | Road to Baghdad, The | Atomic | Modern | Gulf War | WIN | Uses the Close Combat engine. |
| 2004 | D-Day | Digital Reality | Historical | World War II | WIN | Sequel to Desert Rats vs. Afrika Korps. |
| 2004 | Desert Rats vs. Afrika Korps | Digital Reality | Historical | World War II | WIN | |
| 2004 | Full Spectrum Warrior | Pandemic | Modern | Middle East | WIN, XB, PS2, MOBI | Series debuts. Based on a U.S. Army light infantry training simulator. |
| 2004 | Ground Control II: Operation Exodus | Massive | Futuristic | | WIN | Sequel to Ground Control. |
| 2004 | Growlanser Generations | Career Soft | Fantastical | | PS2 | Remake of Growlanser II: The Sense of Justice and Growlanser III: The Dual Darkness. |
| 2004 | History Channel: Alamo – Fight for Independence, The | Zono | Historical | American Civil War | WIN | |
| 2004 | Kingdom Under Fire: The Crusaders | Phantagram | Fantasy | High fantasy | XB | Introduced perspective correct 3D to Kingdom Under Fire series. |
| 2004 | Nexus: The Jupiter Incident | Mithis | Futuristic | The Solar System | WIN | |
| 2004 | Rome: Total War | Creative Assembly | Historical | Imperial Rome | WIN | Features a turn-based strategic layer and a real-time tactical layer. |
| 2004 | Soldiers: Heroes of World War II | Best Way | Historical | World War II | WIN | Series debuts. |
| 2004 | Spartan | Slitherine | Historical | Ancient Greece | WIN | |
| 2004 | Star Wolves | X-bow | Futuristic | Outer space | WIN | RPG characteristics. |
| 2004 | Strength & Honour | Magitech | Historical | | WIN | Series debuts. |
| 2004 | History Channel Civil War The Battle of Bull Run Take Command: 1861, The | Mad Minute | Historical | American Civil War | WIN | |
| 2005 | 1944: Battle of the Bulge | INtex Publishing | Historical | World War II | WIN | Aka No Surrender: Battle of the Bulge (US). Sequel to D-Day. |
| 2005 | Act of War: Direct Action | Eugen | Contemporary, Sci-fi | | WIN | |
| 2005 | Battalion Wars | Kuju | Futuristic | | GCN | Part of the Nintendo Wars series. |
| 2005 | Blitzkrieg II | Nival, The Finest Hour | Historical | World War II | WIN | Sequel to Blitzkrieg. |
| 2005 | Blue Flow | Kogado | Futuristic | | WIN | |
| 2005 | Brigade E5: New Jagged Union | Apeiron | Modern | Central America | WIN | RPG characteristics. |
| 2005 | Codename: Panzers Phase II | StormRegion | Historical | World War II | WIN | Sequel to Codename: Panzers. |
| 2005 | Day After: Fight for Promised Land, The | G5 | Alternate history | Dystopia, Cold War | WIN | AKA Cuban Missile Crisis: The Aftermath. Uses the Blitzkrieg Engine. |
| 2005 | Desert Law | Arise | Sci-fi | Southern USA | WIN | |
| 2005 | Freedom Force vs. the Third Reich | Irrational | Comic retro | World War II | WIN | RPG characteristics. Sequel to Freedom Force. |
| 2005 | Imperial Glory | Pyro | Historical | Napoleonic Era | WIN, OSX | Also has a turn-based "Imperial" mode, much like the Total War series. |
| 2005 | Imperivm III: The Great Battles of Rome | FX | Historical | Classical antiquity | WIN | Sequel to Celtic Kings: Rage of War. |
| 2005 | Kessen III | Koei | Historical | Feudal Japan | PS2 | Sequel to Kessen II. |
| 2005 | Kingdom Under Fire: Heroes | Phantagram | Fantasy | High fantasy | XB | Prequel to Kingdom Under Fire: The Crusaders. |
| 2005 | Legion Arena | Slitherine | Historical | Ancient Rome | WIN, OSX | |
| 2005 | Moscow to Berlin: Red Siege | INtex Publishing | Historical | World War II | WIN | SA add-on to Desert Rats vs. Afrika Korps. |
| 2005 | Real Time Conflict: Shogun Empires | Box Clever, Namco | Historical | Feudal Japan | DS | Extremely poor review scores. |
| 2005 | Stalingrad | DTF | Historical | World War II | WIN | Uses the Blitzkrieg Engine. |
| 2005 | Takeda 2 | Magitech | Historical | Feudal Japan | WIN | Sequel to Takeda. Features a turn-based strategic layer & real-time tactical layer. |
| 2005 | UFO: Aftershock | ALTAR | Futuristic | Earth | WIN | Sequel to UFO: Aftermath. |
| 2005 | Will of Steel | Gameyus | Modern | Middle East | WIN | |
| 2006 | Close Combat: Cross of Iron | Simtek | Historical | World War II | WIN (Remake) | Remake of Close Combat III: The Russian Front. |
| 2006 | Close Combat: RAF Regiment | Atomic | Modern | | WIN | Uses the Close Combat engine as a training tool for the RAF. |
| 2006 | Desperados 2: Cooper's Revenge | Spellbound Entertainment | Historical | Wild West | WIN | Stealth tactics. Sequel to Desperados: Wanted Dead or Alive. |
| 2006 | DropTeam: Mechanized Combat in the Far Future | Battlefront.com | Futuristic | Alien vistas | | Multiplayer only. Players control individual tanks, while a person commands from an overhead tactical map, like in Allegiance. Has no resource collection or unit production. Only demo & MAC version of full game available. |
| 2006 | Evil Islands: Lost in Astral | Nival, Matilda Entertainment | Fantasy | High fantasy | WIN | Russian only expansion to Evil Islands: Curse of the Lost Soul. |
| 2006 | Faces of War (a.k.a. Outfront II) | Best Way | Historical | World War II | WIN | Sequel to Soldiers: Heroes of World War II. |
| 2006 | Full Spectrum Warrior: Ten Hammers | Pandemic | Modern | Central Asia | WIN, XB, PS2 | Sequel to Full Spectrum Warrior. |
| 2006 | Joint Task Force | Mithis | Modern | | WIN | |
| 2006 | Legion Arena: Cult of Mithras | Slitherine | Historical | Ancient Rome | WIN, OSX | Expansion to Legion Arena. |
| 2006 | Medieval II: Total War | Creative Assembly | Historical | Medieval Europe | WIN, LIN, OSX, DROID, iOS | Sequel to Medieval: Total War. Features a turn-based strategic layer and a real-time tactical layer. |
| 2006 | Odama | Vivarium | Historical | Feudal Japan | GCN | |
| 2006 | Pacific Storm | Lesta | Historical | World War II | WIN | Features a strategic campaign layer as well as a real-time tactical layer. |
| 2006 | PSI: Syberian Conflict | Wireframe Dreams | Alternate History | Siberia | WIN | |
| 2006 | Rush for Berlin | StormRegion | Historical | World War II | WIN | Series debuts. |
| 2006 | Star Trek: Legacy | Mad Doc Software | Futuristic | Star Trek | WIN, XB | Players control one ship at a time, but can toggle between ships and issue some commands from an overhead tactical map. |
| 2006 | Star Trek: Tactical Assault | Quicksilver Software | Futuristic | Star Trek | DS, PSP | |
| 2006 | Sword of the Stars | Kerberos Productions | Futuristic | Outer Space | WIN | Features a 4X strategic layer as well. |
| 2006 | Take Command – 2nd Manassas | MadMinute | Historical | American Civil War | WIN | |
| 2006 | Warhammer: Mark of Chaos | Black Hole | Fantastical | Warhammer | WIN, X360 | |
| 2007 | 7.62 | Apeiron | Modern | Central America | WIN | Sequel to Brigade E5: New Jagged Union. RPG characteristics. |
| 2007 | Battalion Wars 2 | Kuju | Futuristic | | Wii | Sequel to Battalion Wars. Part of the Nintendo Wars series. |
| 2007 | Battlestations: Midway | Eidos | Historical | World War II | WIN, X360 | Series debuts. |
| 2007 | Battleships Forever | Sean "th15" Chan | Futuristic | Outer space | WIN | |
| 2007 | Bladestorm: The Hundred Years' War | Omega Force | Historical | Hundred Years' War | WIN, PS3, PS4, X360, XOne | |
| 2007 | Close Combat: Modern Tactics | Simtek | Modern | Alternate present | WIN (Remake) | Remake of Close Combat: Marines. |
| 2007 | Final Fantasy XII: Revenant Wings | Square Enix | Fantastical | | DS | |
| 2007 | Helldorado | Spellbound Entertainment | Historical | Wild West | WIN | Stealth tactics. Sequel to Desperados 2: Cooper's Revenge. |
| 2007 | Heroes of Mana | Brownie Brown | Fantastical | | DS | |
| 2007 | The History Channel: Great Battles of Rome | Slitherine | Historical | Ancient Rome | WIN, PS2, PSP | |
| 2007 | Kingdom Elemental: Tactics | Scott Thunelius, Chronic Logic | Fantastical | High fantasy | WIN | RPG characteristics. |
| 2007 | Rush for Berlin: Rush for the Bomb | StormRegion, Paradox | Historical | World War II | WIN | Expansion to Rush for Berlin. |
| 2007 | SOCOM U.S. Navy SEALs: Tactical Strike | Slant Six | Modern | Panama | PSP | |
| 2007 | Star Wolves 2 | X-bow | Futuristic | Outer space | WIN | RPG elements. Sequel to Star Wolves. |
| 2007 | Talvisota: Icy Hell | Blitzfront Game Studio | Historical | Winter War | WIN | |
| 2007 | Theatre of War | 1C | Historical | World War II | WIN | Series debuts. |
| 2007 | UFO: Afterlight | ALTAR | Futuristic | Mars | WIN | Sequel to UFO: Aftershock. |
| 2007 | War Wound | Apothecary Studios | Futuristic | Earth | WIN | Game data likely, sadly vanished without trace, circa 2023. |
| 2007 | World in Conflict | Massive | Alternate history | Cold War era | WIN | Series debuts. |
| 2008 | Close Combat: Wacht am Rhein | Strategy 3 Tactics | Historical | World War II | WIN (Remake) | Remake of Close Combat: Battle of the Bulge. |
| 2008 | Field Ops | Freeze | Modern | | WIN | Supposedly an FPS/RTS mix. |
| 2008 | Mosby's Confederacy | Tilted Mill | Historical | American Civil War | WIN | Features a turn-based strategic layer & a real-time tactical layer. |
| 2008 | Project Aftermath | Game Faction | Futuristic | | WIN | |
| 2008 | Sango 2 | Magitech | Historical | Ancient China | WIN | Sequel to Sango. Features a turn-based strategic layer & real-time tactical layer. |
| 2008 | Sins of a Solar Empire | Ironclad | Futuristic | Outer Space | WIN | Described as a "full-on, seamless union of an empire building game with real-time tactical combat." |
| 2008 | Sudden Strike 3 | Fireglow | Historical | World War II | WIN | Sequel to Sudden Strike 2. |
| 2008 | Stranger | Fireglow | Fantastical | High fantasy | WIN | |
| 2008 | Tom Clancy's Endwar | Ubisoft | Modern | World War III | WIN, X360, PS3 | |
| 2008 | Universe at War: Earth Assault | Petroglyph | Futuristic | | WIN | Has a strategic layer & a real-time tactical layer. |
| 2008 | Valkyria Chronicles | Sega WOW | Fantasy | World War II | PS3, WIN, PS4, NX | RPG characteristics. |
| 2008 | Warhammer: Mark of Chaos - Battle March | Black Hole | Fantastical | Warhammer | WIN | Expansion to Warhammer: Mark of Chaos. |
| 2008 | Windchaser: Guilds of Glory | Chimera | Fantasy | Fantasy age of sail | WIN | |
| 2008 | XIII Century: Death or Glory | Unicorn | Historical | 13th century | WIN | Described as being "a serious real-time tactical challenge." |
| 2009 | Armada 2526 | Ntronium | Futuristic | Outer Space | WIN | Has a turn-based strategic layer & real-time tactical layer, much like the Total War series. |
| 2009 | Battlestations: Pacific | Eidos | Historical | World War II | X360 | Sequel to Battlestations: Midway. |
| 2009 | Close Combat: The Longest Day | Simtek | Historical | World War II | WIN (Remake) | Remake of Close Combat: Invasion: Normandy. |
| 2009 | Codename: Panzers Cold War | StormRegion | Historical | Cold War II era | WIN | Sequel to Codename: Panzers Phase II. |
| 2009 | Demigod | Gas Powered | Fantasy | War between demigods | WIN | RPG characteristics. |
| 2009 | East India Company | Nitro | Historical | Era of colonization | WIN | Also features a strategic campaign layer. |
| 2009 | Empire: Total War | The Creative Assembly | Historical | | WIN, LIN, OSX, DROID, iOS | Has a turn-based strategic layer & a real-time tactical layer. |
| 2009 | Ironclads: High Seas | Totem Games | Historical | American Civil War | WIN | A naval tactical simulator set in the American Civil War. |
| 2009 | King Arthur: The Role-playing Wargame | Neocore | Fantasy | Britannia | WIN | RPG elements. Battles are described as "real-time tactical fights on unique battlemaps." Features a turn-based strategic layer as well. |
| 2009 | Men of War | Best Way | Historical | World War II | WIN | Sequel to Faces of War. |
| 2009 | Order of War | Wargaming | Historical | World War II | WIN | |
| 2009 | Officers | 3A Games | Historical | World War II | WIN | |
| 2009 | Stormrise | The Creative Assembly | Futuristic | | PS3, WIN, X360 | |
| 2009 | Strength & Honour 2 | Magitech | Historical | Ancient history | WIN | Sequel to Strength & Honour. Features a turn-based strategic layer & real-time tactical layer, much like the Total War series. |
| 2009 | Takeda 3 | Magitech | Historical | Feudal Japan | WIN | Sequel to Takeda 2. Has a turn-based strategic layer & real-time tactical layer. |
| 2009 | Theatre of War II: Africa 1943 (a.k.a. Theatre of War 2: Kursk 1943) | 1C | Historical | World War II | WIN | Sequel to Theatre of War. |
| 2009 | World in Conflict: Soviet Assault | Massive | Historical | Cold War era | WIN | Expansion to World in Conflict. |
| 2010 | Achtung Panzer: Kharkov 1943 | Paradox | Historical | World War II | WIN | Has a turn-based strategy mode & a real-time tactical mode. |
| 2010 | Great Battles Medieval | Slitherine | Historical | Medieval Europe | WIN, PS2, X360 | |
| 2010 | HistWar: Les Grognards (FR wiki) | HistWar.com | Historical | Napoleonic Wars | WIN | Features an "innovative command system" at the Grand Tactical, Tactical and Regimental levels. |
| 2010 | Napoleon: Total War | The Creative Assembly | Historical | Napoleonic Wars | WIN | Sequel to Empire: Total War. Features a turn-based strategic layer & a real-time tactical layer. |
| 2010 | R.U.S.E. | Eugen Systems | Historical | World War II | WIN | |
| 2011 | Cannon Fodder 3 | Game Factory Interactive | 21st century, Sci-fi | Earth, Earth's orbit, Moon | WIN | Sequel to Cannon Fodder 2. First instalment to have 3D GFX & destructible environments. |
| 2011 | Men of War: Assault Squad | Digitalmindsoft | Historical | World War II | WIN | |
| 2011 | Total War: Shogun 2 | The Creative Assembly | Historical | Feudal Japan | WIN, OSX | Sequel to Shogun: Total War. Features a turn-based strategic layer & a real-time tactical layer. |
| 2011 | Under Siege | Seed | Fantasy | | PS3 | |
| 2012 | Carrier Command: Gaea Mission | Bohemia Interactive | Sci-fi | | WIN | Real-time tactics & vehicle sim. |
| 2012 | Jagged Alliance: Back in Action | Coreplay | Modern | South America | WIN | Remake of Jagged Alliance 2. |
| 2012 | King Arthur II: The Role-playing Wargame | Neocore Games | Fantasy | Britannia | WIN | Sequel to King Arthur: The Role-playing Wargame. |
| 2012 | The Bluecoats: North vs South | Little Worlds Studio SARL (FR wiki) | Historical | American Civil War | WIN, OSX, iOS, DROID, PS3, X360 | One of multi remakes of innovative North and South (1989). Delisted in 2023. |
| 2012 | Wargame: European Escalation | Eugen Systems | Modern | Cold War | WIN | |
| 2013 | Total War: Rome II | The Creative Assembly | Historical | Imperial Rome | WIN, OSX | Sequel to Rome: Total War. Features a turn-based strategic layer & a real-time tactical layer. |
| 2013 | Wargame: AirLand Battle | Eugen Systems | Modern | Cold War | WIN | Sequel to Wargame: European Escalation. |
| 2014 | Door Kickers | KillHouse Games | Modern | Urban | WIN, iOS, DROID, NX | |
| 2014 | Men of War: Assault Squad 2 | Digitalmindsoft | Historical | World War II | WIN | Sequel to Men of War: Assault Squad. |
| 2014 | Ultimate General: Gettysburg | Game-Labs | Historical | American Civil War | WIN | |
| 2014 | Wargame: Red Dragon | Eugen Systems | Historical | Cold War | WIN, OSX, LIN | Sequel to Wargame: AirLand Battle. |
| 2015 | Act of Aggression | Eugen Systems | Contemporary, Sci-fi | | WIN | Sequel to Act of War: Direct Action. |
| 2015 | Breach & Clear: Deadline | Mighty Rabbit Studios, Gun Interactive | Zombie apocalypse | City | WIN, OSX, LIN, PS4, XOne | Sequel to 2013 TBS, Breach & Clear. |
| 2015 | Mechs & Mercs: Black Talons | Camel 101 | Sci-fi | Planetary system | WIN | Has mechs & infantry. |
| 2015 | Satellite Reign | 5 Lives Studios | Futuristic | Cyberpunk | WIN, OSX, LIN | Spiritual successor to the Syndicate series. |
| 2015 | There Came an Echo | Iridium Studios | Futuristic, Sci-fi | United States | WIN, PS4 | Sequel to Before the Echo. Unique & optional voice control scheme. |
| 2015 | Total War: Attila | The Creative Assembly | Historical | Imperial Rome | WIN, OSX, LIN | Sequel to Total War: Rome II. Features a turn-based strategic layer & a real-time tactical layer. |
| 2016 | Battlefleet Gothic: Armada | Tindalos Interactive | Futuristic | Warhammer 40,000 | WIN | |
| 2016 | Bokosuka Wars II | Pygmy Studio | Fantasy | High fantasy | PS4, XOne, NX | TRPG; Reverse tower defense. New major features but with virtually same graphics of original 1983 & 1984 titles! |
| 2016 | Brigador | Stellar Jockeys | Futuristic, Cyberpunk | Exoplanet | WIN | |
| 2016 | Shadow Tactics: Blades of the Shogun | Mimimi Productions | Historical | Feudal Japan | WIN, OSX, LIN | Stealth tactics. |
| 2016 | Total War: Warhammer | The Creative Assembly | Fantasy | Warhammer | WIN, OSX, LIN | Features a turn-based strategic layer & a real-time tactical layer. |
| 2016 | We Are the Dwarves | Whale Rock Games | Fantasy | Outer space, Exoplanets | WIN, OSX, LIN, XOne, PS4 | |
| 2017 | Blitzkrieg 3 | Nival | Historical | World War II | WIN, OSX, LIN | Sequel to Blitzkrieg 2. |
| 2017 | Steel Division: Normandy 44 | Eugen Systems | Historical | World War II | WIN | |
| 2017 | Strain Tactics | Touch Dimensions Interactive | Futuristic | Earth | WIN, DROID, iOS | Has both usual RTS control & top down shooter mode. |
| 2017 | Sudden Strike 4 | Fireglow | Historical | World War II | WIN | Sequel to Sudden Strike 3. |
| 2017 | Syrian Warfare | Cats Who Play | Modern war | Syrian civil war | WIN | |
| 2017 | Total War: Warhammer II | The Creative Assembly | Fantasy | Warhammer | WIN, OSX, LIN | Sequel to Total War: Warhammer. Features a turn-based strategic layer & a real-time tactical layer. |
| 2017 | Ultimate General: Civil War | Game-Labs | Historical | American Civil War | WIN | Sequel to UG: Gettysburg. Has new TBS mode. |
| 2018 | Armored Brigade (video game) | Juha Kellokoski | Historical | | WIN | Freeware & commercial tactical wargame, focusing on realism and playability. |
| 2018 | Bad North | Plausible Concept | Historical | Viking Age | WIN, NX, PS4, XOne, iOS, DROID | |
| 2018 | Call to Arms | Digitalmindsoft | Modern | Earth | WIN | |
| 2018 | Total War Saga: Thrones of Britannia | The Creative Assembly | Historical | British Isles | WIN, MAC, LIN | Features a turn-based strategic layer & a real-time tactical layer. |
| 2019 | Battlefleet Gothic: Armada 2 | Tindalos Interactive | Futuristic | Warhammer 40,000 | WIN | Sequel to Battlefleet Gothic: Armada. |
| 2019 | Steel Division 2 | Eugen Systems | Historical | World War II | WIN | Sequel to Steel Division: Normandy 44. |
| 2019 | Total War: Three Kingdoms | The Creative Assembly | Historical | Three Kingdoms | WIN, OSX, LIN | Features a turn-based strategic layer & a real-time tactical layer. |
| 2020 | Cyber Ops | Octeto Studios | Cyberpunk | Fictional country | WIN, OSX | Cyberhacking game with similar look to Frozen Synapse 1-2. |
| 2020 | Desperados III | Mimimi Productions | Historical | Wild West | WIN, MAC, LIN, PS4, XOne, XSX/S | Stealth tactics. Prequel to Desperados: Wanted Dead or Alive. |
| 2020 | Dog Duty | Zanardi and Liza | Modern, Sci-fi | Island chain | WIN, LIN, OSX, NX, PS4, XOne | Retro pixelated 3D graphics & visual tone somewhat like the Cannon Fodder series & General Chaos. |
| 2020 | Nordic Warriors | MashMashu Studios | Fantastical | Norse mythology | WIN, OSX | Influenced by Myth series. |
| 2020 | Partisans 1941 | Alter Games | Historical | World War II | WIN | Stealth tactics. |
| 2020 | The Bluecoats: North & South | Appeal Studios | Historical | American Civil War | WIN, OSX, PS4, XOne, NX | One of multi remakes of innovative North and South (1989), with 3D GFX & FPS action. Similar to the Total War series. |
| 2020 | Total War Saga: Troy | The Creative Assembly | Historical | Bronze Age | WIN, OSX, LIN | Features a turn-based strategic layer & a real-time tactical layer. |
| 2021 | Call to Arms – Gates of Hell: Ostfront | Barbedwire Studios, Digitalmindsoft | Historical | World War II | WIN | Different setting to main game's modern setting. |
| 2021 | Edge of Galaxy | Kinderril | Sci-fi | Outer space | WIN | 3D graphics on 2D plane. Similar to space part of Space Rangers. |
| 2021 | Total War: Rome Remastered | The Creative Assembly, Feral Interactive | Historical | Imperial Rome | WIN, LIN, OSX | Big remaster of Rome: Total War & 2 expansions. |
| 2021 | War Mongrels | Destructive Creations | Historical | World War II | WIN, PS4, XOne, PS5, XSX/S | |
| 2022 | Chromosome Evil | 16 BIT NIGHTS | Lovecraft, Sci-fi | Earth, Underworld | WIN | |
| 2022 | Gray Zone | EastWorks | Futuristic, sci-fi | Outer space, Exoplanets | WIN | Stealth tactics. |
| 2022 | Roma Invicta | Puntigames | Historical | Gaul | WIN, OSX, LIN | Features a turn-based strategic layer & real-time tactical layer. Like North and South (1989) and Total War series. |
| 2022 | SPECWAR Tactics | Applesauce Dev | Modern | Fictional country | WIN, LIN, OSX | |
| 2022 | Total War: Warhammer III | The Creative Assembly | Fantasy | Warhammer | WIN, OSX, LIN | Sequel to Total War: Warhammer II. Features a turn-based strategic layer & a real-time tactical layer. |
| 2023 | Aliens: Dark Descent | Tindalos Interactive | Futuristic | Alien universe | WIN, PS4, PS5, XOne, XSX/S | |
| 2023 | Shadow Gambit: The Cursed Crew | Mimimi Games | Fantasy | Golden Age of Piracy | WIN, PS5, XSX/S | Stealth tactics. |
| 2023 | Total War: Pharaoh | The Creative Assembly | Historical | Bronze Age | WIN, OSX | Features a turn-based strategic layer & a real-time tactical layer. |
| 2024 | Armored Brigade II | Veitikka Studios | Historical | Europe | WIN | Sequel to Armored Brigade, with more fully 3D visuals. |
| 2024 | Manor Lords | Slavic Magic | Historical | Franconia | WIN, XOne, XSX/S | Has city-building & real-time tactics. |
| 2024 | Men of War II | Best Way | Historical | World War II | WIN, LIN | Sequel to Men of War. |
| 2024 | Stargate: Timekeepers | Slitherine Software | Sci-fi | Stargate universe | WIN | Stealth tactics. |
| 2024 | WARNO | Eugen Systems | Historical, Alternate History | Western Europe | WIN | TBS, real-time tactics. Spiritual successor to the Wargame series. |
| 2025 | Broken Arrow | Steel Balalaika Studio | Modern | Baltics | WIN | Like Wargame series & WARNO. |
| TBA | Total War: Warhammer 40,000 | The Creative Assembly | Sci-fi | Warhammer 40,000 | WIN, PS5, XSX/S | TBS; real-time tactics. 1st WH40K title in series. |

== Cancelled Games ==
Only cancelled, abandoned, and some delisted titles, with significant work done, are shown here.

| Year | Title | Developer | Archetype | Setting | Platform | Notes |
|---|---|---|---|---|---|---|
| 2017 (EA) | Deadhold | Dark Quarry Games | Fantastical | Norse mythology | WIN, OSX, LIN | Servers closed in 2018 due to low sales. |

== See also ==
- Lists of video games
- Strategy video game
- List of World War II video games
- List of Vietnam War games
