= Close Combat (video game) =

1996 video game

- Developer: Atomic Games
- Publisher: Microsoft
- Series: Close Combat
- Platforms: Windows, Mac OS
- Release: July 1996
- Genre: Computer wargame
- Modes: Single-player, multiplayer

Close Combat is a 1996 real-time computer wargame developed by Atomic Games and published by Microsoft. Set during World War II, it simulates the conflict between the United States' 29th Infantry Division and Germany's 352nd Infantry Division after the Invasion of Normandy. The player controls an artificially intelligent army whose behavior is dictated by psychological models: each soldier makes decisions based on the circumstances of the battlefield and can disobey the player's orders.

Close Combat began production at Atomic Games under publisher Three-Sixty Pacific in 1992. The following year, Atomic migrated with the project to Avalon Hill, as part of Avalon's attempt to bolster its computer game business. It was originally announced as Beyond Squad Leader, a tie-in to Avalon's million-selling Squad Leader board wargame franchise. However, the companies' relationship was troubled, and Atomic broke away after a high-profile departure at its publisher. Renaming the project Close Combat, Atomic continued production with Microsoft and ultimately released the game in July 1996. Military psychologist Dr. Steven Silver worked with the team to increase the accuracy of Close Combat's psychological modeling.

With sales of 200,000 copies, the game was a commercial success. Critics offered praise to its visuals, and several commended its innovation. Conversely, its slow scrolling was often criticized, and some labeled its use of psychological models as a fundamental mistake. The game started the Close Combat series, which encompassed 17 titles and sold in excess of 5 million copies by 2018. Atomic developed four sequels to Close Combat by 2000 and later created Close Combat: Marines for the United States Marine Corps. Following the company's sale to Destineer, the franchise has continued at other developers under publisher Matrix Games since 2007.

== Gameplay ==
A top-down battle plays out between Germany and the United States near a forest, in one of the bocage regions of France

Close Combat is a real-time computer wargame that takes place from a top-down graphical perspective, in contrast to the isometric visuals used in strategy games such as Warcraft II: Tides of Darkness. A simulation of short-distance battles during World War II, Close Combat recreates the conflict between the United States' 29th Infantry Division and Germany's 352nd Infantry Division in the six weeks after the Invasion of Normandy. The player is able to control either side and manages infantry, crew-served weapons and armor via six commands: move, fire, move fast, defend, hide and smoke. Tactics such as cover, suppression and unit positioning are required to win; soldiers are vulnerable in large groups and while charging. The game's battles play out in bocage environments, open plains, and towns such as Saint-Lô.

Each soldier in Close Combat behaves according to a simulated psyche, which influences his actions, combat readiness, and obedience to the player's commands. Mental and physical combat stresses impact a soldier's behavior and morale; an exhausted or scared squad may grow reluctant to shoot or move, or may fire inaccurately. A soldier under severe stress can become shell shocked and entirely unable to fight, or enter a berserk rage. Units will often disobey poor or dangerous orders, such as exiting cover without proper defense measures. The game's artificial intelligence (AI) system allows even an unattended squad to continue fighting and using tactics.

Close Combat allows players to fight 39 small-scale confrontations or engage in a long-form campaign, which extends from the Normandy landings to the Battle of Saint-Lô. The 29th Infantry Division wins the campaign by claiming Saint-Lô in under 43 days, while the German side focuses on delaying the United States. Players are given pre-selected forces at the start of each mission, and are scored based on the number of enemy units destroyed and objectives captured at the end. In addition to single-player battles against a computer opponent, the game contains multiplayer support for up to two players.

== Development ==
=== Origins ===
Close Combat began production at Atomic Games in 1992, while the company was working on the V for Victory series under publisher Three-Sixty Pacific. It was originally called Project X and focused on real-time infantry tactics in a World War II setting. The inspiration for the project, as a real-time wargame, first came when Atomic president Keith Zabalaoui encountered Dune II. Dr. Steven Silver, a specialist in post-traumatic stress disorder among military veterans, approached the team with his research into state-trait anxiety during this period. He subsequently helped to develop a psychological modeling system for Project X's soldiers. Zabalaoui later said that the company's more traditional wargames "never really excited" him as a designer, and he noted that the veterans Atomic had consulted for those games "repeatedly" brought up the genre's unrealistic portrayal of soldiers' behavior.

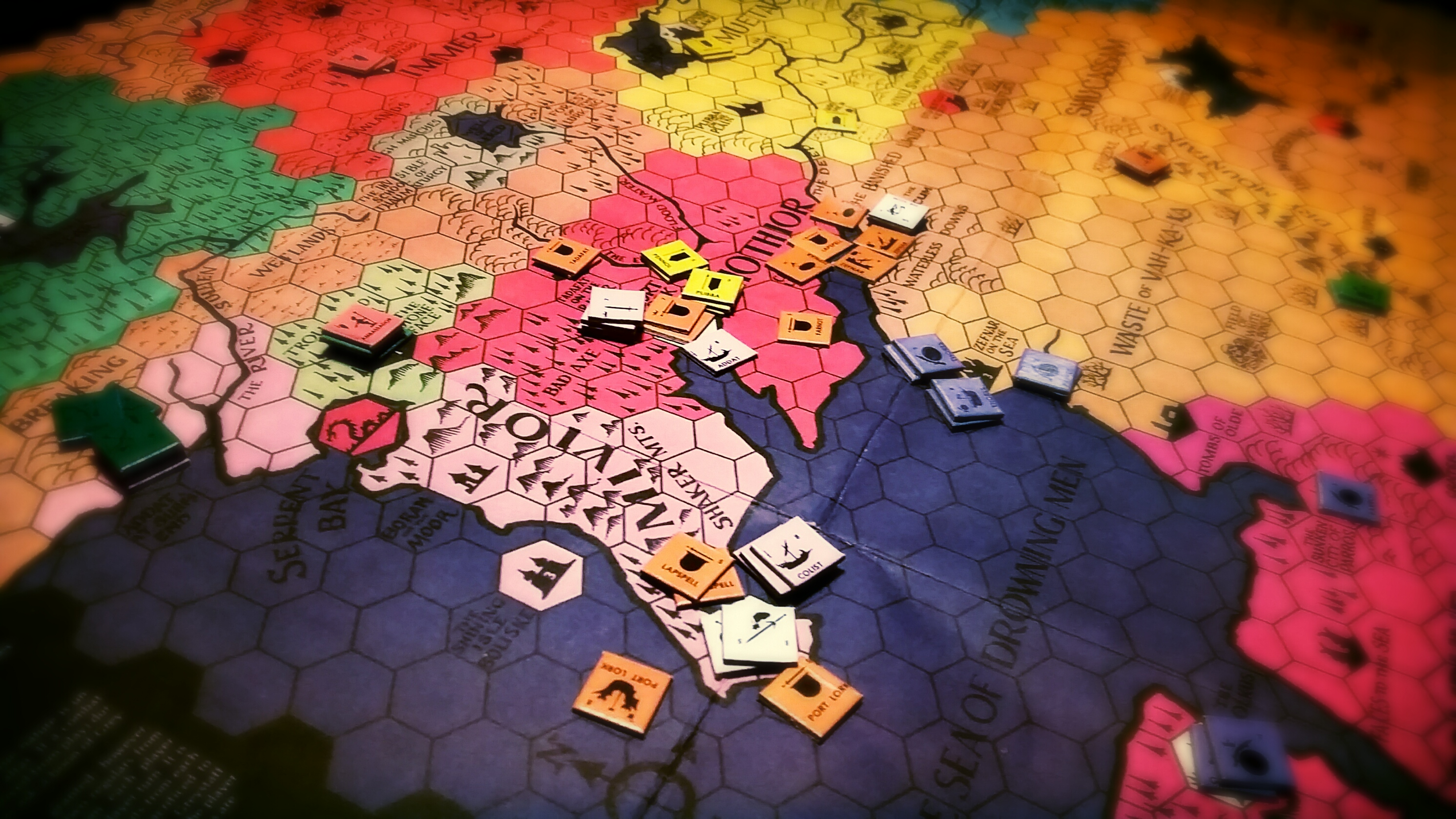
Avalon Hill adopted and rebranded Atomic Games' Project X as Beyond Squad Leader, a tie-in to a successful line of board wargames.

Following a split with Three-Sixty that culminated in a lawsuit for unpaid royalties, Atomic was signed to Avalon Hill's computer game division in 1993 by producer Jim Rose. Initially, Avalon offered the team a chance to create a one-to-one adaptation of the company's Squad Leader board wargame. A computer version of Squad Leader had been considered at Avalon Hill for several years, as the game and its sequel, Advanced Squad Leader, were commercial successes in board form, with sales over 1 million copies by 1997. However, the complexity of the series had made this idea "too daunting" in the past, according to Computer Gaming World's Terry Coleman. After being shown Project X, Avalon Hill chose to adopt and rebrand the game as Beyond Squad Leader, and the Atomic team started developing this project and the World at War series for their new publisher. This partnership was a key piece of Avalon Hill's effort, led by Rose, to revive its computer game branch in the face of flagging board game sales.

Public anticipation for Beyond Squad Leader was high. William R. Trotter of PC Gamer US declared it "perhaps the most eagerly awaited PC wargame ever", thanks in part to the board titles' "fanatical" fanbase. However, Atomic's project was never set to be a literal adaptation of the physical Squad Leader game. Breaking from its source material, the adaptation focused on simulating the psychology of small groups of soldiers via real-time gameplay. The soldiers' AI dictated much of their behavior beyond the player's control. Zabalaoui explained in 1993 that he hoped to capture the experience of real-world military commanders, who "cannot tell what [their] men are going to do in any given situation until it happens". To emphasize this core element, the team automated Advanced Squad Leader's detailed calculations and "focus[ed] on what the game is really all about, which is tactics, and on the play of the game rather than looking up rules", according to Zabalaoui. He later noted that his goal was to recreate the spirit of Squad Leader without adopting its design. Zabalaoui expected Beyond Squad Leader's deviations to prove controversial from the start, and the decision subsequently polarized the wargame community, particularly the biggest fans of the original board series.

=== With Avalon Hill ===
Beyond Squad Leader underwent a long and troubled development cycle, and Atomic and Avalon Hill experienced creative friction during the creation of both it and the World at War games. Computer Gaming World columnist Alan Emrich wrote in 1995, "To say there was no love lost between [...] Jim Rose and Atomic's Keith Zabalaoui would be a gracious understatement." The game was originally announced for a September 1994 release, but Computer Gaming World reported a rumor in July 1994 that the project had been postponed to early 1995. By April that year, PC Gamer US estimated that Beyond Squad Leader was 65% complete and on track for a summer launch. It was ultimately described as vaporware Stephen Poole of GameSpot, while William R. Trotter noted that it "looked like it would never come out." Rose later complained that Avalon Hill's parent company, Monarch Office Services, was disinterested and "conservative" in allocating funds and distribution to the computer game division. He argued that the lack of support led to an unnecessarily slow development cycle for Beyond Squad Leader.

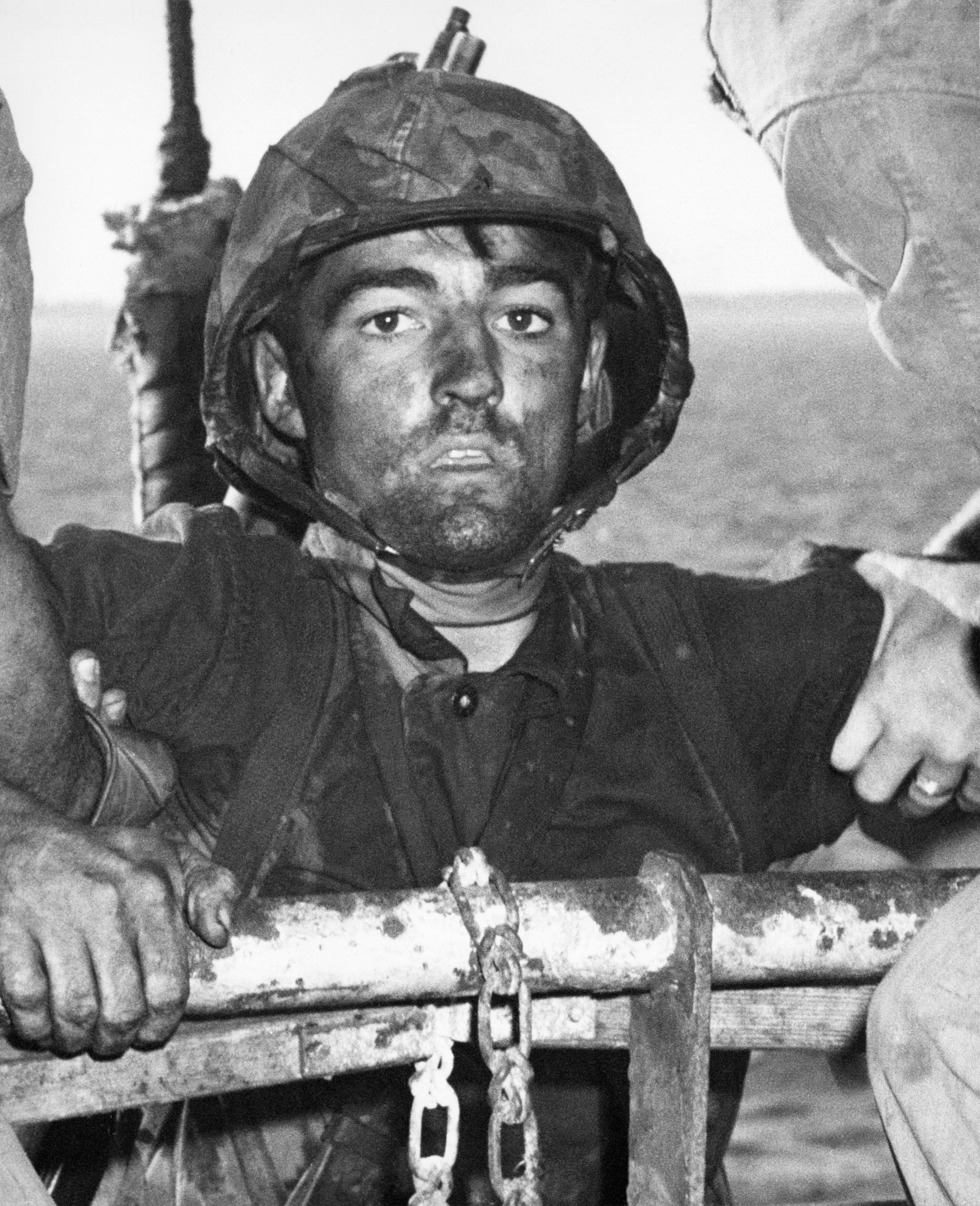
Atomic Games sought to recreate the combat stress reactions of real soldiers, and hired a specialist in post-traumatic stress disorder among military veterans to guarantee accuracy.

By April 1995, Beyond Squad Leader's team size had reached four main programmers, led by coder Steve Mariotti. Roughly 10 team members were ultimately involved in the game. Atomic adopted a relatively loose team structure for the project: Zabalaoui provided the general plan and oversight, while others designed many sections in large part by themselves. Zabalaoui found that this type of delegated work deepened the game and made development more enjoyable. An overriding goal across the team was to attract both mainstream strategy game players and hardcore wargamers, the latter of whom were known for being difficult to please. According to Zabalaoui, Atomic tried to combine detailed simulation for hardcore players with accessible audiovisuals and a streamlined interface. Historical research for the project continued through the planning stage and into production.

Collaborating with Dr. Steven Silver, Atomic gave each soldier an individual anxiety index based on tiredness, preparedness, combat experience, past successes, and other factors. According to T. Liam McDonald of boot, these factors were reduced to numbers and incorporated into "probability tables" that determine soldiers' actions and change in response to events during play. Alongside the soldiers' individual psychological models, Atomic designed a model for a squad's overall anxiety; programmer John Anderson explained that "the influence of [the] team and how that team reacts as a unit makes a huge difference as to whether an individual soldier will actually obey [an] order." Two complementary algorithms, tactical (TAI) and strategic (SAI), power the game's AI system. While TAI controls psychological modeling and low-level action, SAI "is constantly analyzing the battlefield for enemy troops and keeping tabs on the big picture", Zabalaoui said. The game ultimately grew to 2,000 source lines of code that relate to psychological modeling, and more CPU time was allocated to its AI simulation than to its visuals.

By June 1995, Rose had left Avalon Hill to found TalonSoft, and Beyond Squad Leader had entered alpha testing. He felt that the game's limited budget and support intensified after Monarch launched the costly magazine Girls' Life, and he left for TalonSoft as a result. Rose said at the time, "If they'd given me the power and money to do what needed doing, Beyond Squad Leader would be out by now." Avalon Hill Director of Software Development Bill Levay replied that, while the company's decisions "certainly are conservative", the board and computer game divisions were profitable and their overall situation was "really pretty good".

=== Switch to Microsoft ===
Atomic Games split with Avalon Hill in September 1995, and D-Day: America Invades was the two companies' last game together. According to Emrich, Zabalaoui remarked that this event was "purely a business decision" and that there was no ill will between the companies. While the Beyond Squad Leader title remained Avalon Hill's property, Atomic owned all other aspects of the project and chose to continue development under a new title. At the time, Zabalaoui told Trotter that a large company had recently approached Atomic over the project. He further remarked, "I can't say at this point what the game will be called, although I personally like Close Combat". By December 1995, the game's publisher was announced as Microsoft; Atomic was the first developer contracted in Microsoft's wider push into strategy games, which later included Ensemble Studios. According to Zabalaoui, the project's real-time nature and psychological modeling had attracted the publisher, which at the time was seeking "developers with a good track record who could help get them established." Atomic Games was nearly bankrupt, and the deal saved the company. Beyond Squad Leader was ultimately renamed Close Combat, and Microsoft displayed it at the 1996 Electronic Entertainment Expo (E3) in May.

After more than three years of development, Close Combat was completed in June 1996. It was originally set for release on July 23, with an expected price point of $40, but certain stores made it available at that price by July 7.

== Reception ==
Reception

Review scores
Publication	Score
Computer Gaming World	3.5/5
Next Generation	2/5
PC Zone	84/100
Computer Games Strategy Plus	5/5
PC Magazine	2/5
PC Games	A−

Awards
Publication	Award
Computer Games Strategy Plus	Wargame of 1996 (finalist)
PC Gamer US	Best Wargame
Computer Game Entertainment	Best War Game (finalist)
Inside Mac Games	Strategy Game of the Year (finalist)

Close Combat was commercially successful. Upon its release, it became the United States' 13th-best-selling computer game of July 1996, according to market research firm PC Data. Next Generation reported that it was among Microsoft's "most successful titles" as of March 1997. The game achieved global sales of roughly 200,000 copies by early 1999 and attracted a younger demographic than Atomic's past games. Zabalaoui said that the team was "very pleased" with its commercial performance, and that it had outsold their earlier efforts by around ten to one. However, he noted that it was "frustrating to see Close Combat sell only 200,000 units when other RTS titles sell 5 times that or more."

The reviewer for Computer Games Strategy Plus, Steve Wartofsky, hailed Close Combat as an intuitive combat simulation akin to SimCity 2000. He praised its graphics and streamlined quality and called its in-game documentation "wonderful". The magazine later nominated Close Combat as its pick for the best wargame of 1996, but ultimately gave the prize to that year's Battleground games: Shiloh, Antietam, and Waterloo.

In Computer Gaming World, Patrick C. Miller wrote that the game "looks, sounds and plays like nothing else", and considered it a flawed success. Its originality and tactical realism received high marks, but he heavily criticized its limited documentation, in contrast to Wartofsky's view. This issue was compounded by its unresponsive controls and slow scrolling. While Wartofsky praised Close Combat's stripped-down quality as "focus", including its small-scale campaign and lack of a level editor, Miller considered these signs of the product's shallowness. Close Combat's "focus is too narrow, its depth too limited", he argued.

Next Generation's reviewer echoed Miller's criticism of the jerky scrolling, but disagreed with his overall positive assessment and labeled the game "a serious Microsoft misfire." The writer found its AI system fundamentally flawed and remarked that, while allowing troops to disobey orders is interesting in theory, in practice it makes the game frustrating and unfair. Michael E. Ryan of PC Magazine shared Next Generation's negative view of the game, despite echoing Miller's and Wartofsky's praise for its visuals. He considered the troop AI questionable and disliked the abundance of on-screen data. "We immediately found ourselves longing for the relative simplicity of Command & Conquer", wrote Ryan.

Conversely, Andrew Wright called Close Combat "a big step forward for wargamers" in PC Zone, despite its scrolling issues. For him, it was an effective compromise between Command & Conquer and the complexity of traditional wargaming. Although again noting the "sluggish" scrolling, PC Games's Andrew Miller agreed with Wright that Close Combat represented a new plateau for computer wargames and held its audiovisuals in particularly high regard. Like the writer for Next Generation, however, he criticized the visuals for being difficult to read: he noted, "I often mistook the American soldiers for shrubs".

In 1997, the editors of PC Gamer US presented Close Combat with their 1996 "Best Wargame" award and remarked that its developers had "broken away from the long-established, turn-based models of the past". It was also nominated in this category by Computer Game Entertainment, but lost the prize to Tigers on the Prowl 2. PC Gamer soon named Close Combat the 46th-best computer game ever released, and hailed it as "a radical leap forward for wargames, one of the most predictable and staid of PC game genres."

== Legacy ==
=== Early sequels ===
Close Combat was the first game in the long-running Close Combat series, which contained 17 entries and sold above 5 million units by 2018. Its direct sequel, Close Combat: A Bridge Too Far, followed in October 1997. Developed by Atomic Games and published again by Microsoft, the game was a commercial success, with sales equal to those of its predecessor. Following the release of Close Combat III: The Russian Front in December 1998, Microsoft opted to discontinue the Close Combat franchise. While all three games had been profitable, Marc Dultz of CNET Gamecenter reported "indications that the company is now only interested in publishing games that have the potential of selling 250,000 units or more." Up to that point, the company had published the Close Combat games on a "title to title" basis, according to Keith Zabalaoui. Atomic reacted by splitting from Microsoft and migrating to Mindscape's Strategic Simulations (SSI) label in April 1999, in order to create Close Combat IV: Battle of the Bulge (1999). Later that year, Zabalaoui said that Microsoft had been "a terrific publisher", and that Atomic had "parted company [with them] as friends who may some day work together again."

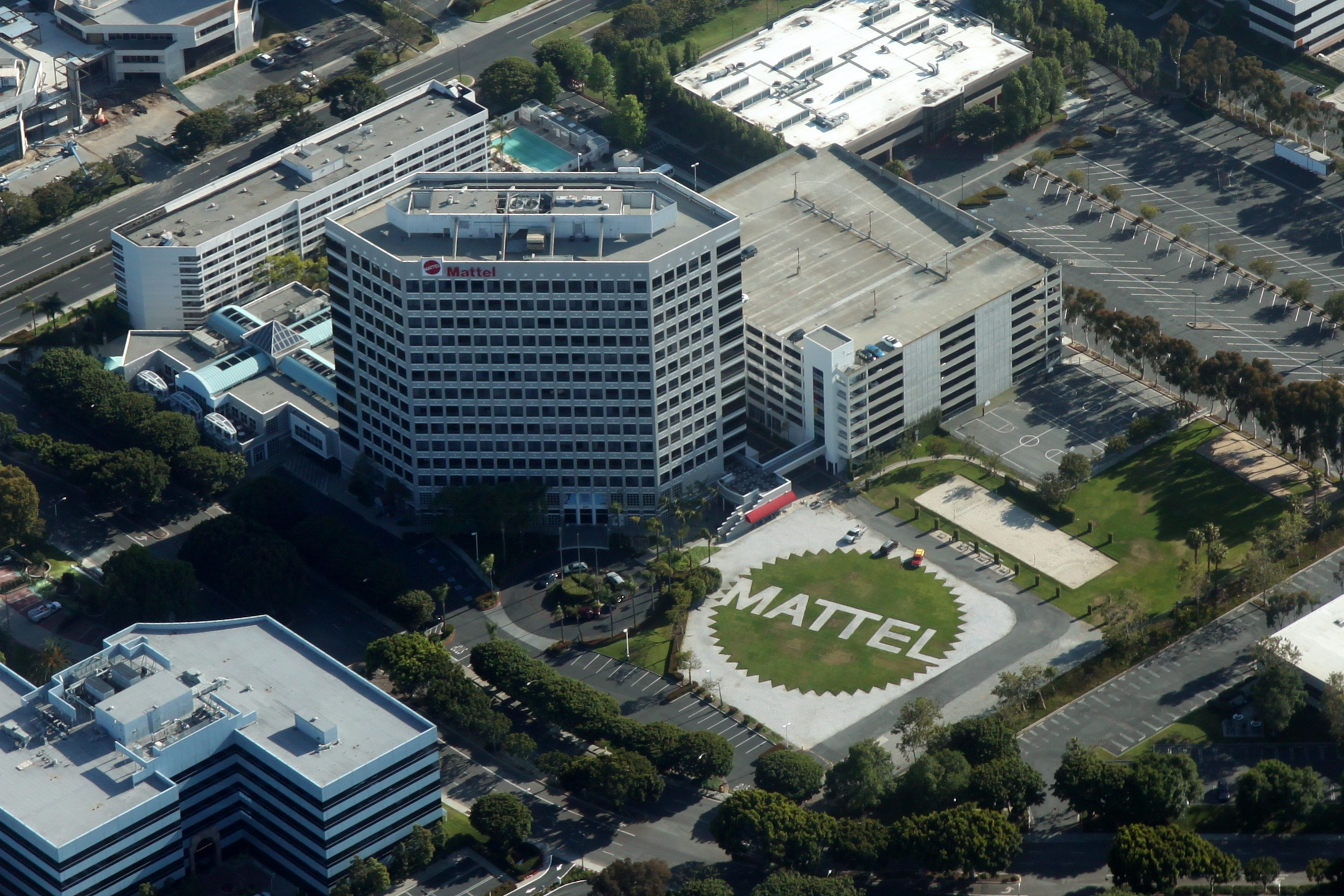
Mattel's purchase and divestment of The Learning Company, Atomic Games' publisher, caused significant financial trouble at the company.

Atomic began work on a fifth Close Combat game with SSI in early 2000. However, Mindscape had since been sold to Mattel when that company bought The Learning Company, Mindscape's parent, for $3.5 billion in 1999. As a result, Close Combat V was published by Mattel Interactive, a financially unstable company. Computer Games Magazine's Robert Mayer noted in September 2000 that "the future of this game series is up in the air—Mattel Interactive is perennially on the trading block, and Atomic ... has lost some key staff members in recent months". Computer Gaming World writer Mark Asher later called Mattel's push into the game industry a "disastrous foray": Mattel's stock dropped and much of its management, including its CEO, was forced to resign.

Late in September, Mattel sold The Learning Company at a bargain price to The Gores Group. A spokesman for the new managers announced that they expected to make it "profitable within six months." The fifth Close Combat, subtitled Invasion: Normandy, was released in October. Two months later, Atomic was forced to lay off all employees beyond Zabalaoui and two other senior members after The Gores Group canceled the team's in-development Hammer's Slammers game. Trey Walker of GameSpot reported at the time, "According to Zabalaoui, Gores exercised its right to cancel the project for 'any reason or no reason at all.' "

=== Later history ===
In 2002, two members of the United States Marine Corps (USMC) began an effort to modify Close Combat for use as a USMC training tool. They subsequently requested that Atomic create an official version for the Marines. The developer started working on USMC training simulations, and ultimately produced Close Combat: Marines for the division's training program in 2003. Douglass C. Perry of IGN noted that it was the USMC's first-ever game project. Atomic's work on Marines was then expanded by developer CSO Simtek, in collaboration with the USMC. Following Marines, Atomic worked with Destineer and the USMC on Close Combat: First to Fight, a first-person shooter intended again as a training tool for the military. Announced in April 2004, alongside the strategy title Close Combat: Red Phoenix, First to Fight was described by Peter Tamte of Destineer as an effort to "combine Destineer's first-person technology with Atomic's military expertise". Destineer ultimately purchased Atomic Games in May 2005, with the stated goal of reviving the Close Combat strategy franchise. The first five entries in the series had sold above 1.2 million units by that time.

In 2006, Destineer licensed the Close Combat intellectual property to Matrix Games; the two companies announced plans to remake and update Atomic's early entries in the series. Partnering with CSO Simtek, Matrix began the creation of Close Combat: Cross of Iron, an expanded remake of Close Combat III. The companies decided not to update the first Close Combat, a choice dictated by "the age of the code, and the fact that the series and game engine changed dramatically after the first iteration", according to Simtek's Shaun Wallace. Matrix proceeded to publish Cross of Iron in 2007. It was followed by Modern Tactics (2007), Wacht am Rhein (2008), The Longest Day (2009) and Last Stand Arnhem (2010). These titles remade Marines, Battle of the Bulge, Invasion Normandy and A Bridge Too Far, respectively.

After completing the remakes, Matrix worked with Slitherine Software to release a new Close Combat entry, Panthers in the Fog, in 2012. Two years later, the companies created Gateway to Caen, the only Close Combat to be released on the Steam platform by that point. Another new title in the series, The Bloody First, was slated for 2018. Atomic's first five Close Combat entries, including the original Close Combat, were re-released on GOG.com early that year.
