= Close combat (disambiguation) =

Close combat is a violent physical confrontation between two or more opponents at short range.

Close combat may also refer to:

- Hand-to-hand combat
- Close Combat (series), a series of real-time tactical computer games
  - Close Combat (video game), the first game in the series
- Close Combat, a 1993 book by W.E.B. Griffin in The Corps Series
- Close Combat, a technical manual in the Marine Corps Martial Arts Program
