= Take Command =

Take Command may refer to:

- Take Command (command line interpreter), a cmd.exe replacement by JP Software
- Take Command Console, a later version of the command line interpreter
- Take Command (computer game), a 2006 computer game by MadMinute Games
