= JTF (disambiguation) =

JTF, or joint task force, is a type of military formation.

JTF may also refer to:

- Joint Task Force (video game)
- Jewish Task Force
- John Templeton Foundation
- Just Transition Fund
