= Armored Brigade (video game) =

2018 video game

- Logo
- Developer: Veitikka Studios
- Publisher: Matrix Games
- Designer: Juha Kellokoski
- Platform: Windows
- Release: November 15, 2018
- Genre: Real-time tactics
- Mode: Single-player

Armored Brigade is a real-time tactical wargame, focusing on realism and playability. The first incarnation of the game was published in 2008 and the most recent version was released in January 2016; marking last freeware version to be published. A commercial version, including drastic gameplay improvements, new features and reworked unit and terrain graphics is being actively developed with scheduled completion during the fall of 2018.

Players control individual tanks and vehicles from a top-down perspective, on a zoomable map. Infantry are mostly in squad/section sized units. The whole force under a player's control ranges from platoon level upwards, depending on battle options.

The games are single player against the AI.

== Gameplay ==
June 18, 1987. Across a birch-dotted valley somewhere in Eastern Europe, a line of US APCs nervously scurry. The friendly scout teams on the wooded slopes ahead hear the rumble of thunder first, but by then it's much too late. Two MiG 21s are overhead in an instant, cluster bombs tumbling from their wings as they pass. In the welter of detonations, three APCs shudder to a halt. The surviving vehicles race for the treeline and disgorge their passengers while Vulcan mini-guns spew leaden fury at the fast-fleeing aircraft.

The first exchange in a typically tense Armored Brigade battle.

Eurogamer

Armored Brigade simulates modern combined-arms combat from platoon to regiment/brigade level from a top-down perspective. Freeware version only represented a hypothetical World War III scenario in 1987, while commercial edition covers all years from 1965 to 1991. Sides available are the US, USSR, West and East Germany, UK, Finland and Poland. There are plans to add more nations (freeware version had 11 nations, but limited to a single year) and open up the timescale, including World War II.

Players can control individual vehicles, platoons and companies. Infantry is mostly in squad/section sized units. The game includes a wide variety of accurately researched and historical squads, weapons, vehicles, aircraft and artillery.

Unit morale, experience level and fatigue, command delay, a wide set of weapon and vehicle parameters are all taken into account to produce realistic combat simulation.

A wide range of orders are available supplemented by a set of standard operating procedures, like different rates of fire, engagement ranges and dismount policy. Furthermore, units can be organized into nine formations, with customizable spacing between individual vehicles.

The current version of the game includes large real world terrain maps, representing areas likely to be involved in a Cold War engagement, including the Fulda Gap and North German Plain.

Up to 0.801 beta version, maps could be randomly generated, either by the built-in map generator with a number of different settings or by an external tool like Terragen (from version 0.704a). Afterwards, real terrain maps were introduced, generated from satellite data. Their size can vary from 2x2 to 15x15 kilometres, on an area covering initially about 7,300 square kilometres and, soon afterwards, increased to 30,000 square kilometres. Different terrain sets for summer, autumn and winter seasons are available. Also included are desert, tropical and "nuclear wasteland" sets. Real world elevation data can also be read by the game to generate accurate maps of anywhere in the world.

The game features a dynamic time of day and variable visibility, with the weather, including night and storm, influencing the battle and ground conditions. Other interesting features are 3D battlefield overview and civilian units.

The games are currently single player against the AI. The AI is able to analyse terrain both in offensive and defensive operations and conduct manoeuvres according to one of predetermined routines - Armored, Mechanized or Infantry - with emphasis placed on the corresponding unit type.

== Reception ==
The game has been widely praised by critics, even in its early incarnation. It has been favourably compared to Steel Panthers, the Combat Mission series and the Close Combat series. Computer and Video Games said it "hides convincing Cold War combat drama under unassuming 2D top-down visuals". By 2013, the game was reviewed and positively rated among others by Eurogamer.dk and Ekstra Bladet, the biggest newspaper in Denmark.

== Modding ==
From 0.697c onward, all data base entries are externalized in XML format and thus are open for modding. Small mods are already available at official forums and more can be expected as the game reaches version 1.0. Commercial versions will include a full editor.
