= Ironclads: High Seas =

- Developer(s): Totem Games
- Publisher(s): Totem Games
- Designer(s): Maxim Ferapontov
- Engine: Oleg Ferapontov
- Platform(s): Microsoft Windows
- Release: September 21, 2009 (online)
- Genre(s): Real-time tactics
- Mode(s): Single-player

Ironclads: High Seas (or IHS) (Russian: Броненосцы: Главный калибр) is a steam-ship period 3D tactical naval simulator focusing on fleet-scale battles in real time. The game allows you to set up battles squadron groups, their formations and management, with realistic ship models and characteristics, as well as advanced ballistics and weapon models.

== See also ==
- Ironclads: American Civil War
