= Sudden Strike 3: Arms for Victory =

2007 video game

- Developer: Fireglow Games
- Publishers: UK: Empire Interactive; RU: 1C Company; NA: Cdv Software Entertainment
- Director: Igor Rzheffkin
- Producer: Victor Vinokurov
- Programmer: Timothy Lyangouzov
- Artist: Alexey Krivorotko
- Composer: Andrey Litvinov
- Series: Sudden Strike
- Platform: Windows
- Release: UK: December 7, 2007; RU: December 14, 2007; NA: June 20, 2008
- Genre: Real-time tactics
- Modes: Single-player, multiplayer

Sudden Strike 3: Arms for Victory or Sudden Strike III is a real-time tactics computer game by Russian studio Fireglow Games set in World War II, the third game in the Sudden Strike series and the sequel to Sudden Strike 2. The game was released in December 2007.

== Gameplay ==
Sudden Strike 3 is the first game in the franchise to feature 3D graphics. The game features the pacific campaigns, as well as the U.S. and Allied campaigns and Germany. It also features a map editor, with more features such as making trenches.

The revamped engine allows for improved damage characteristics, balance of forces, and winter battles. Certain abilities are brought back from earlier games such as ambushes in houses, landing parties, reconnaissance, transportation of infantry on tanks and many other things.

== Expansions ==
Sudden Strike 3: Arms for Victory - Ardennes Offensive is the first addon to the original covering the Battle of the Bulge and was released in 2008. France was included as a new faction as were new multiplayer maps.

Sudden Strike: The Last Stand is an enhanced version of Sudden Strike 3 which was released on March 20, 2009 in Russia. The game features improved graphics and tactical user interface experience.

Sudden Strike Iwo Jima is a standalone campaign featuring the Japanese during the Battle of Iwo Jima as part of Pacific War.

Sudden Strike Normandy is a standalone campaign featuring the Allies during the Normandy landings as part of Operation Overlord.

== Reception ==
GameSpot rated Sudden Strike 3 as the best of the franchise. Sudden Strike 3: Arms for Victory holds a 63 out of 100 Metacritic score based on 10 critic ratings.
