= Takeda (video game) =

2001 video game

- Developer(s): Magitech
- Publisher(s): Xicat Interactive, Inc.
- Platform(s): Microsoft Windows
- Release: November 14, 2001
- Genre(s): Real-time tactics
- Mode(s): Single-player, multiplayer

Takeda is a real-time tactics video game based on the life of Takeda Shingen. Takeda was developed by Magitech Corporation.

== Sequels ==
Magitech Corporation also has produced a sequel, Takeda 2, which incorporates more aspects of the individual development of the generals, aspects such as leadership, etc.

Takeda 3 was completed in February 2009.
