= Deadline (1996 video game) =

1996 video game

- Developer: Millennium Interactive
- Publisher: Vic Tokai
- Platform: MS-DOS
- Release: 18 July 1996
- Genre: Real-time tactics
- Mode: Single-player

Deadline is a 1996 strategy video game developed by Millennium Interactive and published by Vic Tokai. It was the last game to be developed by Millennium Interactive before Sony Computer Entertainment acquired them from CyberLife the following year.

== Gameplay ==
Deadline is a real-time tactics game, in which the player navigates a squad of soldiers through discrete missions. The game combines real-time gameplay with pre-planning stages. Its gameplay style has been compared to that of Jagged Alliance and X-COM: UFO Defense.

== Reception ==
Reception

Review scores
Publication	Score
Computer Games Strategy Plus	2/5
PC Gamer (US)	51%
Computer Game Review	90/100
PC Games	C−

William R. Trotter of PC Gamer US was unimpressed with Deadline. He concluded, "Despite its interesting concept, Deadline is dead on arrival." Computer Game Review's critic was significantly more positive, calling the gameplay "great fun" and arguing that "strategy and action game fans should take a good look at Deadline."
