= Strength & Honour =

2004 video game

- Developer(s): Magitech
- Publisher(s): Magitech
- Platform(s): Microsoft Windows
- Release: 2004
- Genre(s): Real-time tactics

Strength & Honour is a strategy game developed by the Canadian studio Magitech for Microsoft Windows. The game, which focuses on global domination, combines turn-based empire-building mechanics with real-time tactics. Players control various civilizations, ranging from the Romans and Carthaginians in the west to the West Indians and Chinese in the east, in a setting based around 200 BC.

In the game, players choose a ruler and kingdom, then manage the key figures in their empire, including cabinet members, city governors, and military leaders. Each character in the game has a number of attributes which dictate their personality. Among these attributes are honor, ambition, loyalty, political ability, leadership ability, fighting ability, naval ability, and popularity. These traits help determine how well a character fits certain roles. For example, characters with high political ability are suited for administrative positions, while those with strong leadership and military skills are better suited for military roles.

Some traits, such as honor and ambition, remain constant throughout the game, influencing characters' behavior. Characters with high honor, for instance, are less likely to experience sharp declines in loyalty, even when dissatisfied. In contrast, characters with low honor and high ambition are more unpredictable and prone to disloyalty. The popularity of a ruler also plays a crucial role, as characters are less likely to remain loyal to a leader who is widely disliked.

Players must manage both the political and economic aspects of their empire. Characters with high political skills and popularity can help boost recruitment for armies and grow city populations. Additionally, players have control over city and national taxation, though overtaxing can lead to depopulation as citizens leave. The development of a city's philosophical outlook is influenced by the presence of libraries, which can either enhance military leadership or support economic growth through mercantilism or agrarianism.

Despite initial challenges in securing publishers in the US and UK, Magitech self-published Strength & Honour via their website in 2005. The game was successfully published in several other countries, including Australia, Russia, Poland, Italy, China, and Spain in 2004.

The game lacks a multiplayer server and is restricted to local area network (LAN) and TCP/IP networking game play. Multiplayer is restricted to battle mode, with no option for a world mode campaign.
