= We Are the Dwarves =

2016 video game

- Developer: Whale Rock Games
- Publisher: Whale Rock Games
- Platforms: Linux; macOS; Windows; Xbox One; PlayStation 4
- Release: Linux, macOS, Windows: WW: February 26, 2016; Xbox One: WW: February 23, 2017; PlayStation 4: NA: March 28, 2017; EU: March 29, 2017
- Genre: Real-time tactics
- Modes: Single-player, multiplayer

We Are the Dwarves is a real-time tactics video game developed and published by Kyiv-based Whale Rock Games. It was first released in 2016 and is about a trio of spacefaring dwarves who must save their homeland.

== Gameplay ==
A race of spacefaring dwarves discover their sun is dying. Three dwarven kingdoms jointly send an expedition to find a new home. Instead of empty space, the universe is filled with stone, and new planets exist inside caves. Players control three dwarves, each of whom has unique skills and a different focus, representing one of the dwarven kingdoms. Smashfist uses melee weapons, Forcer is a ranged specialist, and Shadow attacks from stealth. Players initially control one dwarf at a time and later control the entire team. Some of the missions have stealth game elements. It is a real-time tactics game that can be paused to issue commands.

== Development ==
The developers, Whale Rock Games, were influenced by the Commandos video game series and R. A. Salvatore's novels about Drizzt Do'Urden. The idea to make a video game about dwarves came first, and they added a universe made of stone for the dwarves to mine and explore. Whale Rock Games failed to fund the game via Kickstarter in 2014, but it was accepted into the Steam Greenlight program. It was released for PCs on February 26, 2016, for Xbox One on February 24, 2017, and PlayStation 4 on March 28, 2017.

== Reception ==
We Are the Dwarves received mixed reviews on Metacritic. Although they said the game "shouldn’t be completely dismissed", Hardcore Gamer called it "viciously unfair" and recommended it only to hardcore fans of the genre. Digitally Downloaded said it is "different, interesting, and often quite clever". 4Players criticized the game balance.
