= Shadow Company: Left for Dead =

1999 video game

Shadow Company: Left For Dead
- Developer: Sinister Games
- Publisher: Ubi Soft
- Platform: Microsoft Windows
- Release: NA: October 20, 1999; EU: 1999
- Genre: Real-time tactics
- Modes: Single-player, multiplayer

Shadow Company: Left for Dead is a real-time tactics game developed by Sinister Games and published by Ubi Soft for Microsoft Windows in 1999. The player begins the game with only a three-man squad, left for dead after an operation in Angola for a company called Granite.

== Plot ==
A feared and well equipped private military company named Granite is hired by a client claiming to be the government of Angola. They are tasked with the mission to recover an important petroleum refining facility, which has been seized by rebels working in conjunction with foreign mercenaries belonging to the rival company Tetsu Yama. However, after the mission is fulfilled, they discover the facility hides something much more sinister. Contracted by the mysterious Mr. Stein, Granite will have to travel to battlefields around the world in the search of the international terrorist organization Genesis.

== Characters ==
=== Playable ===
- Lewis Underwood: A former IRA elite soldier, expert in weapons and explosives and leader of the team.
- John Emerson: A former CIA operative now working in the private sector. Stealthy and lethal, his favorite weapon is the knife.
- Jack Beecher: Former U.S. Marine and combat medic.
- Chloe Marco: Member of the FBI Hostage Rescue Team in forced retirement. She is an expert sniper.
- Peter Bolland: A demolition expert from Canada.
- Johnny Chapps: A demolition expert and heavy soldier from Scotland.
- Miko Furugori: Japanese combate medic and hand-to-hand expert.
- Calvin Green: Machinegun operator and medic from New Zealand.
- Dasha Postnikova: A Russian stealth expert.
- María Santana: An ex-Army Ranger honorably discharged from service. She is both a well balanced character and a heavy weapons expert.
- Tolu Sobande: A Nigerian operative.

=== Others ===
- Leo Heller: Liaison of the company in Brussels. He is task on providing Granite with info about their missions.
- Mr. Stein: Granite's contractor through the game, he works for a group called The Loom, which takes actions against international menaces.
- María Rojas: A South American Loom agent.
- Scofield: A MI6 agent sent to Russia to investigate Genesis's movements. Rescuing him will be Granite's mission.
- José García: A druglord based in Isla de la Juventud, Cuba, who backs up several Marxist guerrilla groups in South America and a biotechnologic corporation named Genetic Systems.
- Genesis: Described as a "rogue political element", Genesis is an international terrorist group interested in acquiring nuclear, biological and chemical weapons. Both Genetic Systems and Tetsu Yama are under its control.

== Reception ==
Reception

Aggregate score
Aggregator	Score
GameRankings	71%

Review scores
Publication	Score
AllGame	3/5
CNET Gamecenter	4/10
Computer Games Strategy Plus	4/5
Computer Gaming World	3.5/5
Eurogamer	7/10
GamePro	4.5/5
GameRevolution	C+
GameSpot	6.2/10
IGN	7.3/10
Next Generation	4/5
PC Accelerator	7/10
PC Gamer (US)	53%

The game received above-average reviews according to the review aggregation website GameRankings. IGN said that the game was "a solid diversion for both strategy and action fans alike." Jeff Lundrigan of NextGen called it "A fun idea done well, and addictive to boot. Shadow Company will steal hours of your time if you're not careful."

== Shadow Company: The Mercenary War ==
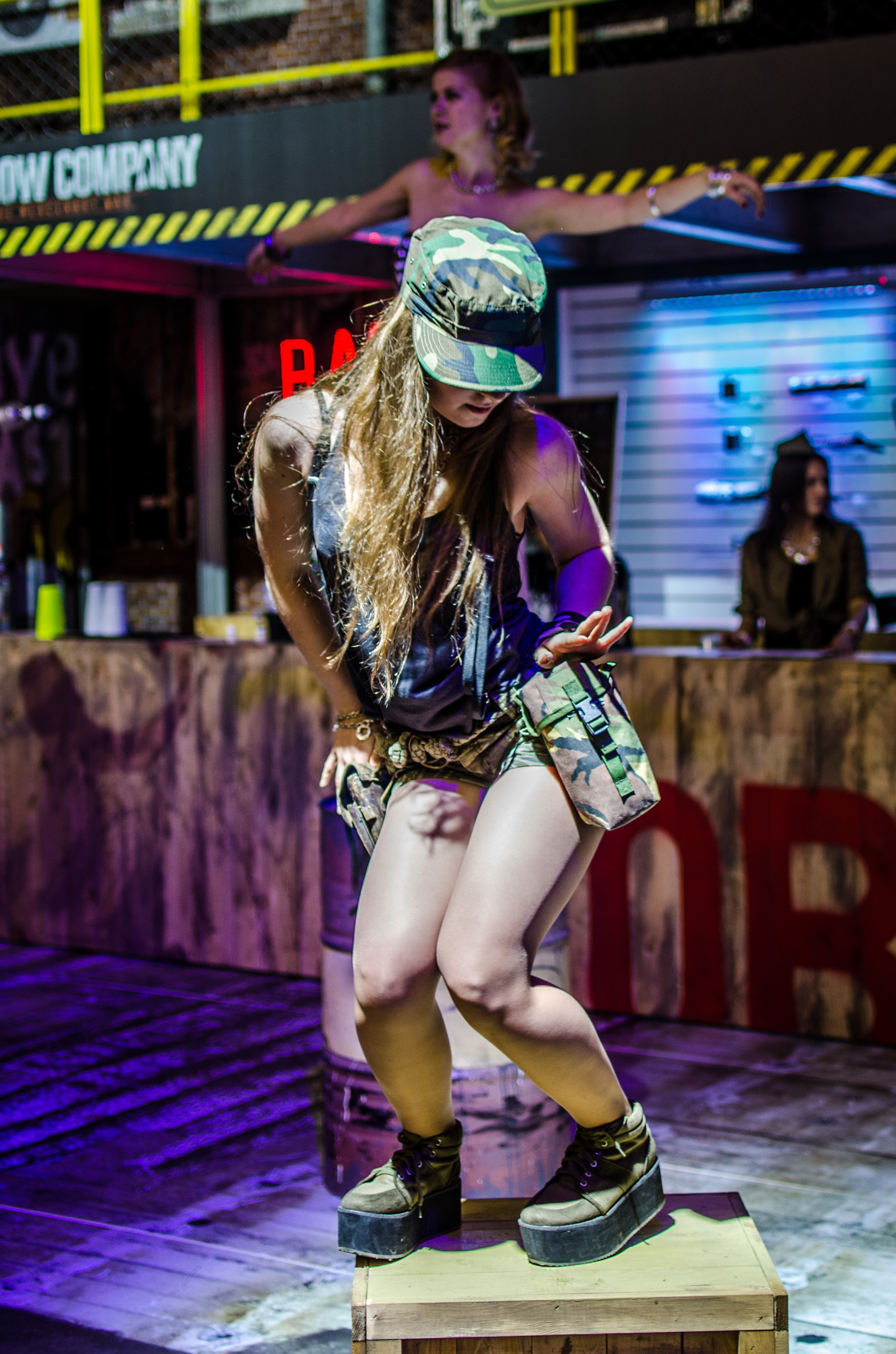
Promotion of Shadow Company: The Mercenary War at IgroMir 2012

The game was followed by Shadow Company: The Mercenary War, a free-to-play first-person shooter published by Nexon in 2012.
