= War Wound =

2007 video game

- Developer: Apothecary Studios
- Platform: Microsoft Windows
- Release: 2007
- Genre: Real-time tactics
- Mode: Single player

War Wound is an isometric action game by British developer Apothecary Studios where the player takes control of a special forces unit during a war in the near future. The game features real-time game play where each mission sees the player take command of a four-man squad who must battle through a series of terrains using various skills.

== Gameplay ==
Screenshot of War Wound, showing an arctic level.

The players controls a four-man squad in a similar way to classic games like Syndicate and Cannon Fodder or more modern games like Commandos 3. Specifically the player moves his squad around the world by clicking on where they should go and they will walk to the point in the level the player clicked on. Pressing the other mouse button will make the current squad shoot from where they are standing in the direction of the mouse pointer.

Squads can be broken up at any time to allow the player to use fewer squad members when walking about. This may give the player an advantage, for instance one man is harder to hit than four men standing closer together or it may be to keep a certain squad member safe because they possess and ability that is crucial to finished that particular mission and cannot be risked.

Each squad member commands the same abilities as any of the others such as the ability to walk, swim, pilot vehicles and fire multiple weapons but the primary squad member is the only squaddie that can also climb certain surfaces. This ability makes him crucial to success on certain missions.
