= Take Command (video game) =

2006 computer game by MadMinute Games

Take Command is a series of real-time tactics video games by American studio MadMinute Games. The series consist of two games, Take Command: Bull Run (2004) and Take Command - 2nd Manassas (2006). The games are real-time wargames depicting some of the major battles of the American Civil War. The developers describe the games as "real-time combat simulators". The first game was released under the Activision Value brand, which is Activision's budget line. The second game is released through Paradox, a Swedish publisher that specializes in strategy games. A third game, based on the Battle of Shiloh, was said to be in development according to the instruction manual for 2nd Manassas, but has likely been discontinued.
