= Joint Task Force (video game) =

2006 video game

- Developer(s): Most Wanted Entertainment
- Publisher(s): HD Publishing; Vivendi Universal Games
- Designer(s): Attila "Maci" Bánki-Horváth
- Platform(s): Windows
- Release: NA: September 12, 2006; UK: September 15, 2006; AU: September 21, 2006
- Genre(s): Real-time tactics
- Mode(s): Single-player, multiplayer

Joint Task Force is a 2006 real-time tactics game for exclusively for Windows in which players command military forces in combat situations.

The game includes officially licensed vehicles and weapons systems from major defense contractors including Boeing, Lockheed Martin, General Dynamics, Northrop Grumman and Sikorsky.

Joint Task Force was developed by Hungarian studio Most Wanted Entertainment and was co-published by HD Publishing and Vivendi Universal Games under the Sierra Entertainment publishing label in September 2006.

== Setting ==
Joint Task Force is set in 2008. In the single-player campaign, players follow the JTF first battalion and its commander, Major Matthew O'Connell. The single player campaign consists of 5 scenarios set in Somalia, Bosnia, Afghanistan, Colombia and Iraq.

== Plot ==
The story begins in war-wracked Somalia, where the most powerful warlord in the country, Akil Farrah, has managed to overthrow the ruling government and proclaims himself President. He establishes a dictatorship, targeting ethnic minorities. The game itself opens in a destroyed town, where Farrah's troops are shooting at fleeing civilians. Farrah arrives on top a tank to watch one of his men execute a captured man, possibly a prisoner. Unbeknownst to them, the act is videotaped by a reporter in hiding, and the tape is shown to Major O'Connell during a briefing. His superior, General Cleveland, informs him that he and the JTF First Battalion will be sent to Somalia to remove Farrah's regime, and grants him the jurisdiction to do whatever it takes to succeed. Cleveland reminds him that this is the first JTF operation, and that no mistakes are allowed. During the briefing Cleveland informs O'Connell that he is aware of 'certain missions' he had accomplished there before. Later, while O'Connell is being flown in to his first mission with the JTF, a monologue reveals that O'Connell had previously fought for Farrah as part of a black ops operation supported by the US government, aimed at reinstating the Resources For Aid program. O'Connell is remorseful of what he did there, and is determined to make up for it by removing Farrah's brutal regime.

In the first mission in the game, O'Connell successfully secures a cargo ship suspected to be used as an arms transport at Port Mogadishu. However, he discovers that whatever cargo the ship had been holding had been removed, only finding a laptop and documents. During later missions in Somalia, General Cleveland informs O'Connell that Intel was able to find little information from the laptop, save email exchange over a 'Product 7' being shipped out. Later, the JTF captures a convoy which had been transporting the materials brought in by the cargo ship during the first mission. O'Connell informs Cleveland that the convoy was carrying HXE explosives, a state of the art explosive more powerful than C4, but not all of the cargo was present in the convoy.

In Mogadishu itself, the JTF is able to capture Farrah's arms minister Mahmoud Abbas, who reveals the location of Farrah himself. During the same mission, one of O'Connell's troops is shot dead when attempting to evacuate a reporter who refuses to leave. Cleveland informs O'Connell that the reporter in question is Pepper Morgan, a world-renowned war-correspondent who has connections to all of the major TV Networks. The JTF is able to infiltrate Farrah's position close to the Kenyan border, but halfway through the mission Cleveland informs O'Connell that instead of capturing Farrah as originally planned, he is now ordered to kill Farrah. An upset O'Connell protests, but ends up being rebuked by Cleveland. The mission is a success, with Farrah being killed when his tank is destroyed. Back at base, where the JTF troops are celebrating, O'Connell sits alone in a dark locker room, where he remembers having fought in a battle in Somalia in the 1990s with another man. Running low on ammo, O'Connell is ordered by the unknown man to booby-trap a prisoner with a grenade, before both of them flee.

After Somalia, the JTF is called to Bosnia after a rogue Serbian General, Arkan Dragović, launched a military offensive into Bosnia to allegedly destroy terrorist camps operated by an organization called 'The Matar'. At some point after the first mission in Bosnia, Dragović's fighter-bombers rupture the Kraduvice Dam, flooding many villages and forests. The JTF captures Kraduvice and close the border, stopping any more hostile reinforcements entering Bosnia. During this time, he comes into contact with Captain Pickett, a tank commander whose forces are incorporated in the JTF. The JTF is free to move into Serbia to apprehend General Dragović in the town of Krasnaja in Serbia; this time, the target is caught alive, which pleases O'Connell.

A Russian arms dealer named Novikov who was involved with the Matar is captured from an oil rig that was about to be destroyed by the Matar using timed explosives. Following this, using intel from Novikov, the JTF is reassigned to Afghanistan to capture a Matar accomplice, a clan leader to be interrogated, only to find that the clan leader was killed during a prison riot at Qala-i-Jangi Prison which the JTF was supposed to contain. After the riot, O'Connell's men are told to capture the original clan leader's brother, who is later found to have died from lead poisoning. After questioning a captured Russian pilot, the JTF investigates a rebel's cave complex, which leads to an old Soviet ICBM missile silo, where the JTF finds an ex-CIA agent, named Courtland, who has a reputation for interrogating and then executing prisoners, for acting as a lone wolf, and is revealed to have been the mysterious man from O'Connell's flashback. After securing the facility, Courtland escapes with the nuke, leaving the JTF in utter confusion as to what to do next.

== Gameplay ==
The gameplay in Joint Task Force is focused around tactical decision making.

Instead of resource collection, players get money to spend per mission and per objective. Troopers and equipment are assigned at the beginning of each mission, and more may be ordered by helicopter and trooper transport. Heavily armoured vehicles such as the M1A2 Abrams tank and the M2A3 IFV are airdropped in by a Hercules transport plane onto a captured runway. Therefore, if a player wants the upper hand in a mission, he must capture and control the runway for armoured support.

Troopers also gain experience and can be promoted to officer status. Officers have a skill tree that can be improved over time, similar to popular role-playing games. These officers will then give the player a massive advantage on the battlefield depending on their speciality. For instance, a vehicle crewman gets a lot of experience from a mission, and is eligible for promotion. This makes him an officer and is most combat effective when in a vehicle.

The singleplayer campaign can be played cooperatively with another player.

The game also features a 'Skirmish' mode where the player can choose one of three factions: JTF, Terrorists or Dictators.

== Reviews ==
- GameSpot: 6.5 (Fair)
- GameSpy: 2.5/5
- IGN: 5.7

== See also ==
- List of real-time tactics video games
