= Star Wolves =

2006 video game

- Developer(s): X-bow Software
- Publisher(s): 1C Company
- Director(s): Aleksey Kozyrev
- Designer(s): Dmitry Gulin; Elena Kozyreva
- Programmer(s): Sergey Semenov
- Artist(s): Sergey Kondratovich
- Writer(s): Dmitry Gulin; Aleksey Kozyrev; Paul Kondrashov; Max Bodrikov
- Composer(s): Max Kachanoff; Artem Kolpakov
- Platform(s): Microsoft Windows
- Release: Retail: RU: 2004; EU: 2005; NA: 2006; GamersGate: WW: 2006
- Genre(s): Real-time tactics RPG; Space simulation
- Mode(s): Single-player

Star Wolves (Russian: Звездные волки) is a real-time, futuristic video game developed by Russian video game developer X-bow Software combining role-playing and real-time tactics gameplay. It was first published in 2004 in Russia by 1C Company, and later in 2005 and 2006 in other parts of Europe and North America, respectively. A sequel, Star Wolves 2, was published in Russia in 2006 and in North America in 2007. Star Wolves 2: Civil War is the latest game in the series (in EU and NA regions it is known as Star Wolves 3: Civil War).

== Gameplay ==
The game features a mix of role-playing and tactical elements, and is centered around controlling a mothership and small armada of fighter craft in real-time using the mouse in a manner very similar to Homeworld. Ships are piloted by characters whose skills advance as the game progresses. The player is able to select from a number of skill specializations for each character, making each character unique. Players can likewise customize each ship's armament and purchase new equipment on the open and black markets. At various times in the game, new characters will join the player's party so that the team becomes larger and more diverse.

== Plot ==
The game is set in the future after mankind has journeyed into outer space and formed an interstellar empire. During the course of the game the Empire becomes threatened by an alien species as well as the huge mega-corporations that have grown to control more and more of people's lives. The player is tasked with forming a rag-tag band of mercenaries to take on missions for the various factions, as well playing his or her own hand in humanity's destiny.

== Development ==
The game was originally envisioned as a turn-based successor to Homeworld, but continued development saw an increased focus on characters and the addition of the "Smart Pause" feature found in such games as Baldur's Gate.

== Reception ==
Star Wolves' Metacritic score and MobyRank (two composite scores of professional video game reviews) are 61 and 73 as of January, 2009. The game got good reviews in Germany and Russia, but bad in English speaking countries due to the horribly localized voiceover.
