= Brigade E5: New Jagged Union =

2005 video game

- Developer(s): Apeiron
- Platform(s): Microsoft Windows
- Release: RU: 2005; NA: October 17, 2006
- Genre(s): Tactical RPG
- Mode(s): Single-player

Brigade E5: New Jagged Union (Russian: Бригада Е5: Новый Альянс) is a real-time tactical role-playing game developed by Russian developer Aperion. It was released in 2005 in Russia, and on October 17, 2006, in North America.

== Reception ==
Reception

Aggregate score
Aggregator	Score
Metacritic	41/100

Review scores
Publication	Score
GameSpot	3.5/10
GameZone	4/10
IGN	3/10

The game received "generally unfavorable reviews" according to the review aggregation website Metacritic. Mark Birnbaum of IGN called it "without exaggeration...one of the worst games I've ever played". Despite the negative reviews in the west, the game was rated the "Best Tactical Game of 2005" by many Russian critics.

== Sequel ==
The sequel, 7.62 High Calibre, was released in Europe on September 12, 2008, and in North America later in 2008.
