= Bokosuka Wars =

1983 video game

- Sharp X1 cover art
- Developers: Kōji Sumii (PC); ASCII (Famicom)
- Publisher: ASCII Entertainment
- Designer: Kōji Sumii
- Platforms: Sharp X1, MSX, FM-7, NEC PC-6001, NEC PC-8801, NEC PC-9801, Family Computer, i-Mode
- Release: Sharp X1: JP: 1983; MSX / PC-88: JP: 1984; PC-98 / FM-7: JP: 1985; Famicom: JP: December 14, 1985; i-Mode: JP: 2004
- Genres: Real-time strategy RPG; Action RPG
- Mode: Single-player

Bokosuka Wars (Note: Japanese: ボコスカウォーズ, Hepburn: Bokosuka Wōzu) is a 1983 action-strategy role-playing video game developed by Kōji Sumii and published by ASCII for the Sharp X1 computer, followed by ports to the MSX, FM-7, NEC PC-6001, NEC PC-8801 and NEC PC-9801 computer platforms, as well as an altered version released for the Family Computer. It revolves around a leader who must lead an army in phalanx formation across a battlefield in real-time against overwhelming enemy forces while freeing and recruiting soldiers along the way, with each unit able to gain experience and level up through battle. The player must make sure that the leader stays alive, until the army reaches the enemy castle to defeat the leader of the opposing forces.

The game was responsible for laying the foundations for the tactical role-playing game genre, or the "simulation RPG" genre as it is known in Japan, with its blend of role-playing and strategy game elements. The game has also variously been described as an early example of an action role-playing game, an early prototype real-time strategy game, and a unique reverse tower defense game. In its time, the game was considered a major success in Japan. The NES version was later released for the Virtual Console service for the Wii, as well as by Hamster Corporation for their Console Archives series for the PlayStation 5 and Nintendo Switch 2.

== Release ==
Originally developed in 1983 for the Sharp X1 computer, it won ASCII Entertainment's first "Software Contest" and was sold boxed by them that year. An MSX port was then released in 1984, followed in 1985 by versions for the PC-6001mkII, PC-8801, PC-9801, FM-7 and the Family Computer (the latter released on December 14, 1985).

LOGiN Magazine's November 1984 issue featured a sequel for the X1 entitled New Bokosuka Wars with the source code included. With all-new enemy characters and redesigned items and traps, the level of difficulty became more balanced. It was also included in Tape Login magazine's November 1984 issue, but never sold in any other form.

The PC-8801 version used to be sold as a download from Enterbrain and was ported for the i-Mode service in 2004. The Famicom version was released for the Wii Virtual Console on April 8, 2008, followed by the Console Archives series for the Nintendo Switch 2 and PlayStation 5 on June 25, 2026.

A sequel, Bokosuka Wars II, by Japanese developer Pygmy Studio, was released in Japan on November 10, 2016, for the PlayStation 4 and Xbox One. A western version was released in February 2017 for Xbox One and October for PlayStation 4. A Nintendo Switch version was released on March 19, 2020, in Japan. The sequel has the option of choosing between two graphics modes: one that is similar to the two 1980's predecessors and a more modern one. It also adds several major new features including a third faction and a co-op mode for two players.

== Plot ==
In the later Famicom version, King Suren's forces have been captured and turned into trees and rocks by King Ogreth. King Suren has to release his warriors from trees and rocks, and defeat King Ogreth's forces. The allies coming from trees and rocks only appear in the Famicom version.

In the earlier X1, MSX and PC versions, however, the player starts with a complete army and may gain some extra knights by freeing them from prison cells, not from trees or rocks. There are no soldiers turned into objects in the original computer versions.

== Gameplay ==
The player can control three chess-like units: the King, Knight, and Pawn. Pressing the D-Pad will move King Suren and his army in the desired direction. Captive soldiers are freed using a knight to break the gates in front of them. In the Famicom version, the player starts the game with only King Suren at 597m, and acquires more allies by bumping against trees, cacti, rocks, and walls using King Suren, which will restore them to their normal form.

Throughout the world of Bokosuka there are obstacles only certain characters can pass. The gates in which Soldiers are locked can only be broken by Knights. Death tiles will kill all characters except Soldiers who will remove them when they step on them. The walls at 500m, 400m, 300m, and 200m can only be broken by King Suren.

When one unit collides with another, a battle takes place. The tile will change to an icon of crossed swords and a then a B (for battle). The victory is automatically calculated by the computer based on the difference between the offensive strengths of the units.

If King Suren dies, the game ends, announcing "WOW! YOU LOSE!". When King Suren succeeds in defeating King Ogreth, the game ends with "BRAVO! YOU WIN!"

The Japanese instruction manual contains the lyrics "Onward, Bokosuka" (すすめボコスカ) to the peculiar game music, written by the programmer himself.
