= Close Combat: Marines =

2004 video game

- Developer: Atomic Games
- Series: Close Combat
- Platform: Microsoft Windows
- Release: September 2004
- Genre: Real-time tactics
- Modes: Single player, Multiplayer

Close Combat: Marines is the first version of the Close Combat universe made specifically for military training purposes. Forces consist of USMC and OpFor troops. The game was first released in the September 2004, issue of the Marine Corps Gazette.

A commercial version for civilians was made called The Road to Baghdad.
