= Close Combat: Invasion: Normandy =

2000 video game

- Developer: Atomic Games
- Publisher: Mattel Interactive
- Series: Close Combat
- Platform: Windows
- Release: October 2000
- Genre: Computer wargame

Close Combat: Invasion: Normandy is a 2000 computer wargame developed by Atomic Games and published by Mattel Interactive for Windows. It is the fifth game in the Close Combat series. A remake, Close Combat: The Longest Day was released in 2009.

== Gameplay ==
Close Combat: Invasion: Normandy is a computer wargame with real-time gameplay, which focuses on military conflict in World War II.

== Development ==
Atomic Games began working on Close Combat: Invasion: Normandy in early 2000, following the release of the fourth Close Combat title, Close Combat: Battle of the Bulge. The previous game had been made for Mindscape's Strategic Simulations Inc. (SSI) label, and Invasion: Normandy began under that publisher. However, Mindscape had since been sold to Mattel when that company bought The Learning Company, Mindscape's parent, for $3.5 billion in 1999. As a result, Close Combat V was published by Mattel Interactive, a financially unstable company. Computer Games Magazine's Robert Mayer noted in September 2000 that "the future of [Close Combat] is up in the air—Mattel Interactive is perennially on the trading block, and Atomic ... has lost some key staff members in recent months".

Late in September, Mattel sold The Learning Company at a bargain price to The Gores Group. A spokesman for the new managers announced that they expected to make it "profitable within six months." Invasion: Normandy was released in October 2000.

== Reception ==
Reception

Review scores
| Publication | Score |
|---|---|
| Computer Gaming World | 3/5 |
| CNET Gamecenter | 8/10 |

According to Metacritic, Close Combat: Invasion: Normandy received "generally favorable reviews" from critics.

The Wargamer named it as the best real-time wargame of 2000.
