= XIII Century (series) =

Series of real-time tactics video games

- The cover for XIII Century: Gold Edition, which contains both of the games from the XIII Century series
- Genre: Real-time tactics
- Developer: Unicorn Games
- Publisher: 1C Company
- Platform: Windows

Aggregate review scores As of 1 June 2025.
Game	GameRankings	Metacritic
XIII Century: Death or Glory	69%	62/100
XIII Century: Blood of Europe	55%	

XIII Century is a series of real-time tactics computer video games developed by Unicorn Studio and released in 2007. The series consists of the titles XIII Century: Death or Glory, its stand-alone expansion XIII Century: Blood of Europe, and a XIII Century: Gold release, which combines these two titles. The games are similar in interface and gameplay to those of the Total War series. The games' single-player campaigns are a series of thematic battles.
