= Close Combat: Battle of the Bulge =

1999 war video game

- Developer: Atomic Games
- Publisher: Strategic Simulations Inc.
- Series: Close Combat
- Release: NA: December 2, 1999; EU: December 24, 1999
- Genre: Computer wargame
- Modes: Single-player, multiplayer

Close Combat: Battle of the Bulge, sometimes known as Close Combat IV: Battle of the Bulge, is a 1999 computer wargame developed by Atomic Games and published by Strategic Simulations Inc. (SSI). A simulation of the Battle of the Bulge during World War II, it is the fourth game in the Close Combat series. A remake, Close Combat: Wacht am Rhein, was released in 2008.

== Gameplay ==
Close Combat: Battle of the Bulge is a computer wargame that simulates the Battle of the Bulge during World War II, using real-time gameplay.

== Development ==
The game was developed by Atomic Games, as the fourth game in the Close Combat series. Atomic had made the first three games for Microsoft, but the publisher had ended the series after the release of Close Combat III: The Russian Front. While all three games had been profitable, Marc Dultz of CNET Gamecenter reported "indications that the company is now only interested in publishing games that have the potential of selling 250,000 units or more." Atomic reacted by splitting from Microsoft and migrating to Mindscape's Strategic Simulations Inc. (SSI) label in April 1999, in order to create Battle of the Bulge.

== Reception ==
Reception

Aggregate score
| Aggregator | Score |
|---|---|
| GameRankings | 81% |

Review scores
| Publication | Score |
|---|---|
| CNET Gamecenter | 9/10 |
| Computer Games Strategy Plus | 3.5/5 |
| Computer Gaming World | 4/5 |
| Eurogamer | 8/10 |
| GamePro | 3.5/5 |
| GameSpot | 8.2/10 |
| GameZone | 7.6/10 |
| IGN | 8.4/10 |
| PC Accelerator | 9/10 |
| PC Gamer (US) | 84% |

The game received favorable reviews according to the review aggregation website GameRankings.

It was a finalist for Computer Games Strategy Plus' 1999 "Wargame of the Year" prize, although it lost to Panzer Campaigns I: Smolensk '41. The staff wrote, "Atomic Games’ innovative series finds a new home but retains its high-quality gameplay." The game was also a runner-up for Computer Gaming World's 1999 "Wargame of the Year" award, which ultimately went to Sid Meier's Antietam! The staff wrote that the former was the latter's only "serious competition" for the award, but was hampered by "AI quirks and mysteriously reincarnating units".

== Sequel ==
Following the game, Atomic began work on a fifth Close Combat game with SSI in early 2000. However, Mindscape had since been sold to Mattel when that company bought The Learning Company, Mindscape's parent, for $3.5 billion in 1999. As a result, Close Combat V was published by Mattel Interactive, a financially unstable company. Computer Games Magazine's Robert Mayer noted in September 2000 that "the future of this game series is up in the air—Mattel Interactive is perennially on the trading block, and Atomic ... has lost some key staff members in recent months". Late in September, Mattel sold The Learning Company at a bargain price to The Gores Group. A spokesman for the new managers announced that they expected to make it "profitable within six months." The fifth Close Combat, subtitled Invasion: Normandy, was released in October.
