= Sid Meier's Gettysburg! =

1997 video game

- Developer: Firaxis Games
- Publisher: Electronic Arts
- Designer: Sid Meier
- Composer: David Evans
- Platform: Microsoft Windows
- Release: NA: October 14, 1997
- Genre: Real-time wargame
- Modes: Single-player, multiplayer

Sid Meier's Gettysburg! is a 1997 real-time wargame developed by Firaxis Games and published by Electronic Arts. It was designed by Sid Meier, and followed by Sid Meier's Antietam! in 1999. Sid Meier’s Gettysburg! is the first game made by Firaxis.

== Gameplay ==
A battle scene

The game allows the player to control either the Confederate or Union troops during the Battle of Gettysburg in the American Civil War. It can be played as single scenarios, or as a campaign of linked scenarios, either recounting the original history or exploring alternative possibilities.

=== Online play ===
There was a large online following when the game was being hosted on Mplayer (a multi-player game network bought by GameSpy industries). After moving to GameSpy, the game dwindled in popularity for online players. At the pinnacle of online play, there were many groups of players. A competitive ladder (league) was also a fixture of this time, where the hall of fame can still be viewed. "Case's Ladder" Online play is now, for the most part, impossible due to the shutdown of GameSpy's servers.

As of 2025, the game is still playable online with GameRanger.

== Development ==
The engine was also used for the Napoleonic game Waterloo: Napoleon's Last Battle (as was a modified version for Austerlitz: Napoleon's Greatest Victory), both by BreakAway Games.

== Reception ==
Reception

Aggregate score
Aggregator	Score
Metacritic	92/100

Review scores
Publication	Score
AllGame	4.5/5
Computer Gaming World	4.5/5
GameSpot	9.3/10
Next Generation	5/5
PC Gamer (US)	91%
PC Zone	90%
Computer Games Strategy Plus	4.5/5

Gettysburg! was a commercial success, with more than 200,000 copies sold by August 1999. At the time, Jeff Briggs of Firaxis commented that the game "did extremely well for us". From critics, it received "universal acclaim" according to the review aggregation website Metacritic.

During the AIAS' inaugural Interactive Achievement Awards, Gettysburg! was a nominee for "PC Strategy Game of the Year", which was ultimately awarded to StarCraft and Age of Empires (tie). Similarly, the Computer Game Developers Conference nominated Gettysburg! for its "Best Strategy/Wargame" Spotlight Award, but gave the prize to Myth: The Fallen Lords. However, it was named the best computer wargame of 1997 by Computer Gaming World, Computer Games Strategy Plus and GameSpot. The editors of Computer Gaming World called it "the return to form of arguably the best designer ever", and wrote that "this is one game that really will play until Johnny comes marching home."

Next Generation stated that "Gettysburg is an excellent first offering from Firaxis. It not only overshadows previous historical sims, but it also beats most of the realtime strategy games available today." They cited its simple, intuitive control interface as key to making it stand out from the often overly complex games in its genre, stating that it allows players to more easily focus on the finer points of strategy and planning. J.C. Herz, writing for The New York Times, pondered the assumptions underlying the game's simulation of the historical battle. He felt that the game could be a useful tool to teach history but worried that the interactive medium could obscure historical facts behind its systems.

In 1998, Gettysburg won the Origins Award for Best Strategy Computer Game of 1997.

== Legacy ==
Gettysburg had a large modification ("mod") community. Players can customize uniforms, maps, sounds, and units. This aspect of tweaking the game proved vital to Civil War aficionados looking for historically accurate models. This ultimately led to the creation of other famous battles such as the Battle of Fredericksburg, the First Battle of Bull Run, the Peninsula Campaign, and more.
