= Age of Sail (video game) =

1996 video game

- Developer: TalonSoft
- Publisher: TalonSoft
- Platform: Microsoft Windows
- Release: November 23, 1996
- Genre: Computer wargame
- Modes: Single-player, multiplayer

Age of Sail is a 1996 naval combat computer wargame developed and published by TalonSoft.

== Gameplay ==
The game covered the naval campaigns of the French Revolutionary Wars, Napoleonic Wars and other more minor conflicts in the period 1775 to 1820. In addition to the campaigns there are more than 100 independent scenarios based on significant naval actions including the battles of Trafalgar and Camperdown. The game includes a scenario editor with over 2,000 historically accurate sailing ships allowing the extension of the game by the user.

== Development ==
TalonSoft announced Age of Sail on July 12, 1996. It was initially scheduled for a fall 1996 release.

== Reception ==
Reception

Review scores
Publication	Score
Computer Games Strategy Plus	3/5
Computer Gaming World	3/5
PC Gamer (US)	85%

The game received middling scores from Computer Games Strategy Plus and Computer Gaming World. The former publication's Robert Mayer wrote, "It should appeal greatly to fans of naval warfare, but for those gamers not inspired by stories of Trafalgar and St. Vincent, it might just be a bit too austere." Conversely, it received a positive review from William R. Trotter of PC Gamer US, who called it a "sumptuous looking, smooth-playing recreation of a fascinating era."

== Legacy ==
In 2001, Age of Sail was followed by the sequel title Age of Sail II, developed by the Russian studio Akella.
