= Close Combat III: The Russian Front =

1999 video game

- Developer: Atomic Games
- Publisher: Microsoft
- Series: Close Combat
- Platform: Windows
- Release: NA: January 15, 1999; EU: 1999
- Genre: Computer wargame
- Modes: Single-player, multiplayer

Close Combat III: The Russian Front is a 1999 computer wargame developed by Atomic Games and published by Microsoft. It is the third game in the Close Combat series. It revolves around the Eastern Front during World War II, and takes players from the invasion of the Soviet Union to the final battle for Berlin in 1945. A remake, Close Combat: Cross of Iron, was released in 2007.

== Gameplay ==
Battles follow the general pattern of the Close Combat series. Apart from a difficulty slider, there are realism settings which disable the fog of war, unit initiative, difficulty of access to enemy info, etc.

The Grand Campaign follows the Eastern Front from the German invasion of the Soviet Union (Operation Barbarossa), to Stalingrad and ultimately Berlin. Players can pick either side.

== Reception ==
Reception

Aggregate score
| Aggregator | Score |
|---|---|
| GameRankings | 78% |

Review scores
| Publication | Score |
|---|---|
| AllGame | 3/5 |
| CNET Gamecenter | 7/10 |
| Computer Games Strategy Plus | 3.5/5 |
| Computer Gaming World | 3.5/5 |
| Game Informer | 8/10 |
| GameRevolution | C |
| GameSpot | 9.2/10 |
| IGN | 9/10 |
| PC Accelerator | 8/10 |
| PC Gamer (UK) | 88% |
| PC Gamer (US) | 92% |

Award
| Publication | Award |
|---|---|
| PC Gamer US | Best Wargame 1999 |

The game received favorable reviews according to the review aggregation website GameRankings.

It sold 45,438 copies during 1999. Author James Dunnigan reported that it was the year's best-selling wargame. According to Marc Dultz of CNET Gamecenter, the title was profitable and achieved total sales of "well over 100,000 units" by April 1999.

The staff of PC Gamer US presented the game with their 1999 "Best Wargame" prize. They hailed it as the "strongest Close Combat title yet", and wrote that it "vividly recreate[s] the fluidity and chaos of real combat without compromising playability." The game received a nomination by the Academy of Interactive Arts & Sciences for PC Strategy Game of the Year at the 2nd Annual Interactive Achievement Awards, and a nomination for IGN's pick for 1998's best strategy game; however, these prizes ultimately went to Sid Meier's Alpha Centauri and StarCraft, respectively.

== Legacy ==
Following the release of Close Combat III, Microsoft opted to discontinue the Close Combat franchise in early 1999. The game and its predecessors had been profitable, but CNET Gamecenter's Dultz reported "indications that the company is now only interested in publishing games that have the potential of selling 250,000 units or more." Atomic reacted that April by splitting from Microsoft and migrating to Mindscape's Strategic Simulations (SSI) label, with the goal of creating a fourth Close Combat based on the Battle of the Bulge. Later that year, Zabalaoui said that Microsoft had been "a terrific publisher", and that Atomic had "parted company [with it] as friends who may some day work together again."

Close Combat IV: Battle of the Bulge was released in November 1999, followed by Close Combat: Invasion Normandy in October 2000. After Atomic's sale to Destineer in 2005, its new parent partnered with Matrix Games to create expanded remakes of the Close Combat games, starting with Close Combat III. The result was Close Combat: Cross of Iron, released by Matrix and developer CSO Simtek in 2007. Remakes of Battle of the Bulge, Invasion Normandy and A Bridge Too Far followed, along with the new titles Panthers in the Fog (2012), Gateway to Caen (2014), and The Bloody First (2019).

Sales of Atomic's original five Close Combat games, including Close Combat III, totaled 1.2 million units by the mid-2000s. By 2018, the series contained 17 entries and had sold above 5 million units.
