= Close Combat (series) =

Series of realtime strategy video wargames

- The official logo of the franchise as used in the third game of the series
- Genre: Real-time computer wargame
- Developers: Atomic Games; CSO Simtek; Strategy 3 Tactics
- Publishers: Microsoft; Strategic Simulations, Inc. Matrix Games
- Creator: Keith Zabalaoui
- Platforms: Microsoft Windows, Mac, Xbox, Wii
- First release: Close Combat; July 1996

Close Combat is a series of real-time computer wargames by Atomic Games. In the Close Combat series, the player takes control of a small unit (platoon or company sized) of troops and leads them in battles of World War II from a top down 2D perspective.

== History ==
Close Combat was developed as a computer game version of the acclaimed Avalon Hill board game Advanced Squad Leader (ASL). The primary consultant for the morale model was Dr. Steven Silver, a specialist in combat-related trauma. Atomic Games had already developed several games for Avalon Hill, such as Operation Crusader and Stalingrad. However, with Avalon Hill embroiled in a financial crisis that would ultimately lead to its demise, Atomic Games took what work they had completed, severed ties with the board game franchise and completed the game's development for Microsoft. The first three Close Combat games were notable, at the time, for being among the few games published by Microsoft. The final two games in the original series were, however, published by Strategic Simulations, Inc (SSI).

Close Combat I and II were distributed for both Microsoft Windows and Apple Mac OS. Later versions were released for Microsoft Windows only. In 2005, Atomic Games was bought by Destineer. Destineer licensed the game to Matrix Games to develop three more Close Combat titles. Matrix Games hired first CSO Simtek and later Strategy 3 Tactics to develop these titles.

The five original Close Combat games were real-time computer wargames, with a top-down perspective and two-player capabilities. Each was set in a different European theatre of the Second World War. Each game included a mixture of infantry and armoured units, whilst the later games also included artillery, mortars and air support. Although viewed from a top-down perspective, the later games modelled terrain elevation, and included buildings with multiple floors and viewable sides. The overall tone emphasised realism, and modelled the emotional or physical state of the soldiers and equipment which included, panicked, berserk, burning, incapacitated, pinned and many others.

=== Games ===
| Year | Game | Platform | Notes |
|---|---|---|---|
| 1996 | Close Combat | Windows, Mac OS | First Close Combat game released. Set in Operation Cobra |
| 1997 | Close Combat II: A Bridge Too Far | Windows, Mac OS | Set in Operation Market Garden |
| 1998 | Close Combat III: The Russian Front | Windows | Set in the whole Eastern Front (1941–1945) |
| 1999 | Close Combat: Battle of the Bulge | Windows | Set in The Battle of the Bulge |
| 2000 | Close Combat: Invasion: Normandy | Windows | Set in Operation Overlord |
| 2004 | Close Combat: Marines | Windows | First modern day Close Combat game. Only available to members of the USMC |
| 2004 | The Road to Baghdad | Windows | Commercial version of Marines |
| 2005 | Close Combat: First to Fight | Xbox, Windows, Mac OS X, Wii | First and only game to be a first-person shooter. |
| Cancelled | Close Combat: Red Phoenix | Windows, Xbox | Based on the Red Phoenix novel by Larry Bond. Planned for release in Q4 2005 but got cancelled |
| 2007 | Close Combat: Cross of Iron | Windows | Remake of Close Combat III: The Russian Front |
| 2007 | Close Combat: Modern Tactics | Windows | Remake of Marines and last commercial modern day Close Combat game |
| 2008 | Close Combat: Wacht am Rhein | Windows | Remake of Close Combat IV: Battle of the Bulge |
| 2009 | Close Combat: The Longest Day | Windows | Remake of Close Combat V: Invasion Normandy |
| 2010 | Close Combat: Last Stand Arnhem | Windows | Development (Remake) based on Close Combat II: A Bridge Too Far and The Longest Day; developed by Matrix Games. |
| 2012 | Close Combat: Panthers in the Fog | Windows | First game to feature 32-bit graphics. Set in Operation Luttich |
| 2014 | Close Combat: Gateway to Caen | Windows | First release on Steam. Set in Operation Epsom |
| 2019 | Close Combat: The Bloody First | Windows | First 3d game in the series. Set in the Tunisia Campaign, Operation Husky, and Operation Overlord |

== Gameplay ==
The game contains a number of gameplay elements:

- Mental condition: Close Combat used a psychological (morale) model for each individual combatant. The combatant's morale would be affected by factors such as being near officers, being supported by other units, being under fire, taking casualties, and being left without orders. Troops would be Stable when they were in no danger; Cowering when pinned down by enemy fire; or Panicked when surrounded by dead comrades, wounded or near enemy flamethrowers. The use of a psychological model made certain tactics, common in RTS games where the units will follow suicidal orders, impossible in Close Combat. For example, attempting a "rush" in Close Combat would result in units seeking cover, refusing to obey orders or even deserting.
- Experience: In Close Combat, reserve units or newly replaced troops would fire and move more slowly and be more likely to panic. Because of this, they would be unlikely to prevail against veteran troops. This is unlike most RTS games where all troops of a particular type act similarly.
- Ammunition levels: The game also modelled the amount of ammunition each unit possessed. Troops in a heavy fire-fight would quickly run out of ammunition. Once out of ammunition they would resort to bayonet fighting, or surrender to any enemies that approached them, although they could also scavenge weapons or ammunition from fallen friendly and enemy soldiers. This is in contrast to most RTS games, where units have unlimited ammunition supplies.
- Scavenging: Starting from the third installment in the series, soldiers that expended all ammo could be moved into close vicinity of dead soldiers to take their ammunition. If no ammunition was present at times they would pick up whatever weapon the dead soldier had. Enemy weapons could be picked up as well. However, enemy ammo cannot be scavenged by itself.
- Physical state: In Close Combat, troops could be Healthy; Injured by enemy fire (in which case they would move and fire more slowly); Incapacitated if enemy fire caused the soldier to be unable to fight; and finally Dead. This is in contrast to most RTS games, where units fight and move regardless of their closeness to death.
- Stamina: In Close Combat, troops could be Rested; Winded after exerting themselves, in which case they would move slowly until they were rested again; and Fatigued, after prolonged exertion, slowing them down for the rest of the battle. This is in contrast to most RTS games, where units do not tire.

== Tactics ==
The factors above meant that the game required realistic military tactics, such as careful placement of troops in cover, ambush, advancing under cover and using terrain or smoke-screens to cover advancing troops. Effective management, such as keeping teams near their officers, not sending green recruits on assaults and maintaining fire discipline so as not to run out of ammunition were also necessary for the player to prevail.

Players also have to make effective use of combined-arms tactics to be successful in Close Combat. Infantry assault require support from machine guns, tanks, and mortars, to suppress enemy fire. Armor units also require screening from infantry units. Although they possess superior firepower, tanks are vulnerable to ambushes from bazooka or panzerschreck units, especially in close quarters such as a town or forest, where the ambushing infantry can wait to have a shot at a tank's vulnerable flank or rear armor. Tanks are also vulnerable to fire from concealed anti-tank guns, or ambushing tanks, which may wait to fire until the enemy presents his flank or rear.

== Multiplayer ==
All versions except Close Combat: Modern Tactics offer only one vs one multiplayer. Modern Tactics offers three on three and Close Combat: Marines offers four on four, although these versions added more multiplayer ability.

== Remakes ==
Four of the five original games, A Bridge Too Far, The Russian Front, The Battle of the Bulge and Invasion Normandy have since been remade with new units and maps, updated graphics (maps and sprites) and sound, updated map editors, menus, as well as fixing the compatibility issues that the older iterations of each game had with modern operating systems. Each remake, with the exception of Last Stand Arnhem, also includes the original version of the game that can be played without any of the additions included in the remake.

== Reception ==
Close Combat was commercially successful, with worldwide sales of roughly 200,000 units by 1999. Zabalaoui said that the game outsold Atomic Games' earlier efforts by around ten to one.

Like its predecessor, A Bridge Too Far achieved worldwide sales of roughly 200,000 units by 1999. Atomic Games' head Keith Zabalaoui said that the first two Close Combat titles each outsold the company's earlier games by around ten to one.

In the United States, Close Combat III sold 45,438 copies during 1999, and was the year's best-selling wargame.

The first five Close Combat games totaled 1.2 million units in sales by April 2004. By 2018, the combined sales of the series' 17 entries had surpassed 5 million units.
