= Real-time tactics =

Subgenre of tactical wargames

Real-time tactics (RTT) is a subgenre of tactical wargames played in real-time, simulating the considerations and circumstances of operational warfare and military tactics. It is differentiated from real-time strategy gameplay by the absence of classic resource micromanagement and base or unit building, and by the greater importance of individual units and a focus on complex battlefield tactics.

== Characteristics ==
Typical real-time strategy titles encourage the player to focus on logistics and production as much as or more than combat, whereas real-time tactics games commonly do not feature resource-gathering, production, base-building or economic management, instead focusing on tactical and operational aspects of warfare such as unit formations or the exploitation of terrain for tactical advantage. Real-time tactical gameplay is also characterized by the expectation of players to complete their tasks using only the combat forces provided to them, and usually by the provision of a realistic (or at least believable) representation of military tactics and operations.

This contrasts with other current strategy game genres. For instance, in large-scale turn-based strategy games battles are generally abstracted and the gameplay close to that of related board games. Real-time strategy games de-emphasize realism and focus on the collection and conversion of resources into production capacities which manufacture combat units thereafter used in generally highly stylized confrontations. In contrast, real-time tactics games' military tactical and realistic focus and comparatively short risk/reward cycle usually provide a distinctly more immediate, intense and accessible experience of battlefield tactics and mêlée than strategy games of other genres.

As suggested by the genre's name, also fundamental to real-time tactics is real-time gameplay. The genre has its roots in tactical and miniature wargaming, where battle scenarios are recreated using miniatures or even simple paper chits. These board and table-top games were out of necessity turn-based. Only with computer support was turn-based play and strategy successfully transposed into real-time. Turn-based strategy and turn-based tactics were obvious first candidates for computer implementation; but as computer implementation eventually allowed for ever more complex rule sets, some games became less timeslice-focused and more continuous until eventually "real-time" play was achieved.

== Genre classification ==
While some publications do refer to "RTT" as a distinct subgenre of real-time strategy or strategy, not all publications do so. Further, precise terminology is inconsistent. Nonetheless, efforts have been made to distinguish RTT games from RTSs. For instance, GameSpy described Axis & Allies (the 2004 video game) as a "true RTS", but with a high level of military realism with such features as battlefield command organization and supply lines. A developer for Close Combat said their game never aspired to be an RTS in the "classic sense", but was rather a "real time tactical simulation", lacking such features as resource collection. A developer of Nexus: The Jupiter Incident remarked on his game being called a "tactical fleet simulator" rather than a "traditional RTS", citing its focus on tactical gameplay and fixed units at the start of each mission.

=== Comparison with real-time strategy ===
In general terms, military strategy refers to the use of a broad arsenal of weapons including diplomatic, informational, military, and economic resources, whereas military tactics is more concerned with short-term goals such as winning an individual battle. In the context of strategy video games, however, the difference often comes down to the more limited criteria of either a presence or absence of base building and unit production.

Real-time strategy games have been criticized for an overabundance of tactical considerations when compared to the amount of strategic gameplay found in such games. According to Chris Taylor, lead designer of Supreme Commander, "[My first attempt at visualizing RTSs in a fresh and interesting new way] was my realizing that although we call this genre 'Real-Time Strategy,' it should have been called 'Real-Time Tactics' with a dash of strategy thrown in." Taylor then went on to say that his own game featured added elements of a broader strategic level.

In an article for GameSpy, Mark Walker said that developers need to begin looking outside the genre for new ideas in order for strategy games to continue to be successful in the future.

In an article for Gamasutra, Nathan Toronto criticizes real-time strategy games for too often having only one valid means of victory—attrition—comparing them unfavorably to real-time tactics games. According to Toronto, players' awareness that their only way to win is militarily makes them unlikely to respond to gestures of diplomacy; the result being that the winner of a real-time strategy game is too often the best tactician rather than the best strategist. Troy Goodfellow counters this by saying that the problem is not that real-time strategy games are lacking in strategic elements (he calls attrition a form of strategy); rather, it is that they too often rely upon the same strategy: produce faster than you consume. He also says that building and managing armies is the conventional definition of real-time strategy, and that it is unfair to make comparisons with other genres when they break convention.

== Brief history and background ==
Wargaming with items or figurines representing soldiers or units for training or entertainment has been common for as long as organised conflicts. Chess, for example, is based on essentialised battlefield movements of medieval unit types and, beyond its entertainment value, is intended to instill in players a rudimentary sense of tactical considerations. Today, miniature wargaming, where players mount armies of miniature figurines to battle each other, has become popular (e.g., Warhammer Fantasy Battle and Warhammer 40000). Though similar to conventional modern board wargames (e.g. Axis & Allies), in the sense of simulating war and being turn-based, the rules for miniature wargames tend to lean heavily towards the minutiae of military combat rather than anything at a strategic scale.

Though popular as table-top games, tactical wargames were relatively late in coming to computers, largely due to game mechanics calling for large numbers of units and individual soldiers, as well as advanced rules that would have required hardware capacities and interface designs beyond the capabilities of older hardware and software. Since most established rule sets were for turn-based table-top games, the conceptual leap to translate these categories to real time was also a problem that needed to be overcome.

Avalon Hill's 1982 release Legionaire for the Atari 8-bit computers was a real-time wargame of Romans versus Barbarians with game play reminiscent of the current real-time tactics template, called by one review a "real-time simulation of tactical combat". Likewise, Free Fall Associates' 1983 title Archon can be considered an early real-time tactics game, built upon Chess but including real-time battle sequences. Archon was highly influential, and, for instance, Silicon Knights, Inc.'s 1994 game Dark Legions was virtually identical to it, adding only to Archon's concept that the player, as in many table-top wargames, purchases his army before committing to battle. Drakkhen (1989) was noteworthy for combining the genre with RPG gameplay. Drakkhen allowed the player to micromanage four specialized fantasy units in a 3D battlefield during each random encounter. Another predecessor was Bits of Magic's Centurion: Defender of Rome (published for the PC by Electronic Arts in 1990), in which, similar to the recent Rome: Total War game, the game took place on a strategic map interspersed by battle sequences. However, though the battles were in real-time, they were of small scope and player interaction was limited to deciding the initial troop disposition. Lords of the Realm, released in 1994 by Impressions Games, introduced real-time control of these real-time battles.

=== Eastern Europe ===
The 2000s (decade) saw a number of tactical simulations developed in Eastern Europe. Examples include real-time tactics titles such as those belonging to the Blitzkrieg, Sudden Strike and UFO (not to be confused with UFO: Enemy Unknown by MicroProse) series; as well as stand-alone titles like Nexus: The Jupiter Incident, Joint Task Force, and Codename: Panzers.

== Examples in different settings ==
=== Historical and contemporary ===
Real-time tactics games with historical or contemporary settings generally try to recreate the tactical environment of their selected period, the most common eras and situations being the World War II, Napoleonic warfare or ancient warfare. Numerically they make up the bulk of the genre.

While the degree of realism is uniform, the scale of command and precise mechanics differ radically according to the period setting in keeping with the tactics of that period. So for instance, titles set in the Napoleonic Wars are often played at a company or battalion level, with players controlling groups of sometimes hundreds of soldiers as a single unit, whereas recreations of modern conflicts (such as the Iraq War) tend to offer control down to squad or even individual level.

- The Total War series by The Creative Assembly, as exemplified by the first title, Shogun: Total War (2000), is widely recognised for its large-scale tactical recreations of battles. Units are organised and controlled in regiments, frequently of fifty to a hundred soldiers, and the games are built to encourage the use of authentic tactics. Battles are freeform and generally take place in open country, and there are no plotted side-missions as in the Warhammer games (discussed below). Rome: Total War (2004) was praised for its impressive attention to detail and encouragement of tactical thought.
- Sid Meier's Gettysburg! (1997) and its prequel Sid Meier's Antietam! (1998) (by Firaxis Games), set in the American Civil War, are the best-known examples of Napoleonic style simulations directly after Napoleon Total War. Common to these games is the recreation in detail and scale of a particular set of significant or well-known battles. Using the same engine Firaxis and BreakAway Games also released Waterloo: Napoleon's Last Battle which recreates Napoleon Bonaparte's last and most famous battle of 1815. Also noteworthy is Imperial Glory (2005) by Pyro Studios which recreates the multi-polar conflicts of Europe between 1789 and 1830.
- The Close Combat series (1995–) (by Atomic Games) are tactical battle simulations set in WWII known for a very high degree of realism taking into account limited ammunition, severity of wounds and the psychology and mental welfare of individual soldiers.
- TalonSoft's Age of Sail (1996) and Age of Sail II (2001) are 3D naval real-time tactics games where you command sailing vessels in high sea and coastal battles. Beyond heading, aspects such as amount of sails and cannon ordnance can be ordered.
- Commandos series (1998–2006), a stealth-oriented real-time tactics, is set during World War II and follow the adventures of a fictional British Commandos unit. Each mission is loosely based on historical events during World War II to carry the plot.
- Sudden Strike (2000) (by Fireglow Games). In contrast to the Close Combat series, this title focuses on larger-scale operations and mechanised tactics rather than low-level details, though individual units have ammunition supplies and gain experience.
- In the Desperados series (2001–2020), player controls up to six characters in a wild west setting. The first game takes place in 1881.
- Robin Hood: The Legend of Sherwood (2002) is a stealth-based real-time tactics video game developed by Spellbound Studios. It is similar to games such as Desperados: Wanted Dead or Alive and the Commandos series.
- Praetorians (2003): A Game on Julius Caesar's Conquest.
- Soldiers: Heroes of World War II (2004) (Codemasters) is similar to Close Combat, also being set in WWII. It offers greater autonomy over individual units as well as 3D graphics.
- The Full Spectrum Warrior series (2004–2006) (by Pandemic Studios) is set in a fictional country similar to Iraq. The games revolve around a maximum of two fireteams of four soldiers each, and offer engagements at a far more intimate level than the Total War series, or indeed the genre at large. It also emphasises story more than most real-time tactics titles. Despite a visual appearance similar to first-person shooters, the player does not directly control any character, instead only issuing orders to his troops. As such it qualifies as a real-time tactical game, and is distinct from the subgenre of first-person shooters known as tactical shooters that incorporate some tactical aspects, such as Ubisoft's Rainbow Six series and Gearbox Software's Brothers in Arms.
- Cossacks 2 (2005) is set during the Napoleonic Wars, and supports battles of up to 64000 soldiers. It has a high degree of realism with its morale system and damage model, as well as the fact that the player controls companies of certain number of individual units. Morale serves as a role similar to hit points, increasing or decreasing based upon certain events (such as soldiers being fired at, or soldiers firing upon the enemy). The player is thus deprived of control over the company whenever it falls under a certain level of danger. Soldiers in the Napoleonic wars carried muskets, which did little damage over long distances and took a lot of time to reload. This is reflected in the game, as it takes a long time for a company to reload before it can produce another volley. Further, reloading costs resources, and the food resource is constantly drained depending on how many soldiers the player controls.
- Faces of War (2006) (Ubisoft) is a sequel to Soldiers: Heroes of World War II.
- World in Conflict (2007) is set in an alternate 1989 as the Soviet Union invades Western Europe and the United States' West Coast in a last-ditch effort to hold onto power while economic troubles threaten to cripple the country.
- The Wargame series is another RTT game which focuses on various Cold War scenarios between 1975 and 1995. There are currently three games in the series (Wargame: European Escalation, Wargame: AirLand Battle), with a third (Wargame: Red Dragon) released in 2014 offering new opportunities with the introduction of naval combat and amphibious operations. Wargame is characterized by its large maps, realistic feel and vast array of units and factions.
- Tom Clancy's EndWar (2008) is based on a fictional World War III in 2020 where nuclear weapons are obsolete and conventional warfare makes up the bulk of the gameplay.
- XIII Century (latest installment 2009) is set in the time of the Fourth to Ninth Crusades (1202–1272 CE) and features a complex battle resolution engine where each individual soldier is taken into account when determining the outcome.
- Men of War (2009) is a sequel to Faces of War and started the Men of War series.
- Shadow Tactics: Blades of the Shogun (2016) is a spiritual successor to the Commandos series in Japan's Edo period.
- Last Train Home (2023) is based on the revolt of the Czechoslovak Legion during the Russian civil war against the Bolsheviks. The gameplay combines elements from the real time tactics, roleplaying and resource management genres.

=== Fantastical ===
While most fantasy titles bear some resemblance to a historical period (usually medieval), they also incorporate fictional creatures, areas, and/or magic, and are limited by few historical constraints.

The leading High Fantasy real-time tactics games belong to the Warhammer Fantasy Battle series.

- Warhammer: Shadow of the Horned Rat (1995). This is one of the earliest mainstream real-time tactics games. While the game's depth of tactical simulation is comparable to that of Total War, it leans more toward skirmishes over epic battles, and features both unique hero characters and a tightly-authored story.
- The highly influential video game Myth: The Fallen Lords (1997) emphasised formation cohesion to a lesser degree than the Warhammer titles, but introduced more extensive maps.
- Warhammer: Mark of Chaos released in 2006. Similar in kind to the two preceding Warhammer titles, it however took gameplay away from the realistic focus and fidelity of the Warhammer rules toward a more arcade- and micromanagement-oriented form.
- Kingdom Under Fire: The Crusaders and its sequel were complex and difficult games made in Korea mixing both elements of RTT and Dynasty Warriors-like action.
- Under Siege is another example of tactical battles, where strategy is an interesting point to have in mind. The player is able to control a small group of heroes who fight against a huge invading army. It includes a single player campaign as well as local and online multiplayer content. The ingame editor enables the players to create and share their own maps with the world, taking advantage of the player-generated content.

=== Futuristic ===
A supply ship with destroyer escort in Nexus: The Jupiter Incident

Games set in the future and combining elements of science fiction obviously are not constrained by historical accuracy or even the limitations of current technology and physics. Developers thus have a freer hand in determining a game's backstory and setting. Games that are set in outer space can also add a third, vertical movement axis, thereby freeing up new tactical dimensions.

- Ground Control's (2000) setting provided innovative new use of air units.
- Starship Troopers: Terran Ascendancy (2000) is an action-oriented game based on Robert A. Heinlein's book, Starship Troopers. It is characterised by smaller and more autonomous units.
- MechCommander 2 (2001) is notable for implementing a lightweight resource acquisition system without turning into an RTS. Players could earn 'Resource Points' at the beginning of and during a mission, but they could only expend them upon support tasks. Save for repairs and plucky on-field salvage operations, the system did not affect the player's combat forces in any way.
- Soldiers of Anarchy (2002) is a post-apocalyptic, squad-level game which emphasised a realistic environment scale, vehicles, and scavenging in the aftermath of battles.
- Nexus: The Jupiter Incident (2004) is set in space and replaces as a result most genre conventions (not least of which is the use of terrain for cover and mobility) with its own.
- Star Wolves (2004) is focused on small-scale space fighter wing battles around fighter carriers. Notable for the distinct pilots under your command and for incorporating elements of role-playing games such as character attribute development with experience.
- Ground Control II: Operation Exodus (2004) is a sequel to Ground Control.
- Warhammer 40,000: Dawn of War II (2009) involves commanding four of six Space Marines squads in each mission, each of which can be customised through experience points and wargear upgrades. Its predecessor, Dawn of War, was a real-time strategy game.
- Command & Conquer 4: Tiberian Twilight (2010) is the final chapter in the Kane saga. It has changed the formula of a C&C RTS making it a full-fledged RTT.
- End of Nations (cancelled ) combines the action and strategy of a traditional real-time tactics game (RTT) with the persistence, progression and social features of a massively multiplayer online game (MMO). It focuses on building squads consisting of different types of units and taking control points.
- Star Trek: Away Team (2001) is set in the fictional Star Trek universe. The stealth missions that the player sends commandos to perform do not accurately represent the in-universe principles of the Starfleet faction the player assumes, but accurately represents the RTT genre. A small number of commandos with unique skills, including "computer hacking" or Star Trek's Vulcan nerve pinch, infiltrate enemy bases and rescue captured comrades and accomplish primary and secondary objectives.

== See also ==
- List of real-time tactics video games
- List of military tactics
- Strategy game
- Tactical role-playing game
- War
