= List of Deep Silver games =

This is a list of video games published by Deep Silver.

== List of video games ==
Title	Platform(s)	Release date	Developer(s)
World War II: Frontline Command	Microsoft Windows	May 2, 2003	The Bitmap Brothers
X²: The Threat	Microsoft Windows	February 4, 2004	Egosoft
Singles: Flirt Up Your Life!	Microsoft Windows	February 11, 2004	Rotobee Realtime 3D
Kicker Manager 2004	Microsoft Windows	June 11, 2004	Proline Software
The Fall: Last Days of Gaia	Microsoft Windows	November 15, 2004	Silver Style Entertainment
Scrapland	Microsoft Windows	February 4, 2005	Mercury Steam Entertainment / The Mauretania Import Export Company
Singles 2: Triple Trouble	Microsoft Windows	May 27, 2005	Rotobee Realtime 3D
Alexander: The Heroes Hour	Microsoft Windows	June 2, 2005	Meridian'93
Earth 2160	Microsoft Windows	September 2, 2005	Reality Pump
Neuro Hunter	Microsoft Windows	September 2, 2005	Media Art
Kingdom Under Fire: Heroes	Xbox	October 7, 2005	Blueside
X³: Reunion	Microsoft Windows	October 28, 2005	Egosoft
Kicker Manager	Microsoft Windows	March 3, 2006	Proline Software
SpellForce 2: Shadow Wars	Microsoft Windows	April 7, 2006	Phenomic Game Development
War on Terror	Microsoft Windows	April 7, 2006	Digital Reality Software
City Life	Microsoft Windows	April 28, 2006	Monte Cristo
Wildlife Zoo	Microsoft Windows	May 12, 2006	B-Alive
Rush for Berlin	Microsoft Windows	May 26, 2006	StormRegion
Secret Files: Tunguska	Microsoft Windows	September 4, 2006	Fusionsphere Systems / Animation Arts
ParaWorld	Microsoft Windows	September 15, 2006	SEK
The Guild 2	Microsoft Windows	September 15, 2006	4HEAD Studios
Gothic 3	Microsoft Windows	October 13, 2006	Piranha Bytes
1701 A.D.	Microsoft Windows	October 26, 2006	Related Designs
Warhammer: Mark of Chaos	Microsoft Windows	November 14, 2006	Black Hole Entertainment
Xpand Rally Xtreme	Microsoft Windows	December 1, 2006	Prominence
SpellForce 2: Dragon Storm	Microsoft Windows	March 23, 2007	Phenomic Game Development
Wildlife Park 2: Crazy Zoo	Microsoft Windows	March 30, 2007	B-Alive
City Life: World Edition	Microsoft Windows	April 13, 2007	Monte Cristo
Dawn of Magic	Microsoft Windows	April 27, 2007	SkyFallen Entertainment
Rush for Berlin: Rush for the Bomb	Microsoft Windows	April 27, 2007	StormRegion
The Guild 2: Pirates of the European Seas	Microsoft Windows	May 18, 2007	4HEAD Studios
Wildlife Park 2: Marine World	Microsoft Windows	August 31, 2007	B-Alive
World Snooker Championship: Season 2007-08	Nintendo DS	October 26, 2007	Blade Interactive
City Life: 2008 Edition	Microsoft Windows	November 26, 2007	Monte Cristo
CrossworDS	Nintendo DS	November 27, 2007	Independent Arts
Anno 1701: The Sunken Dragon	Microsoft Windows	December 1, 2007	Related Designs
Wildlife Park 2: Horses	Microsoft Windows	2007	B-Alive
The Immortals of Terra: A Perry Rhodan Adventure	Microsoft Windows	February 29, 2008	3D-IO Games
Secret Files: Tunguska	Nintendo DS	April 25, 2008	10tacle Studios Mobile
Secret Files: Tunguska	Wii	April 25, 2008	Keen Games
Enemy Engaged 2: Desert Operations	Microsoft Windows	August 22, 2008	Gameyus Interactive
Secret Files 2: Puritas Cordis	Microsoft Windows	August 29, 2008	Animation Arts / Fusionsphere Systems / Creatown
S.T.A.L.K.E.R.: Clear Sky	Microsoft Windows	August 29, 2008	GSC Game World
Warhammer: Mark of Chaos - Battle March	Xbox 360	September 3, 2008	Black Hole Entertainment
Sacred 2: Fallen Angel	Microsoft Windows	October 2, 2008	Studio II Software
X³: Terran Conflict	Microsoft Windows	October 16, 2008	Egosoft
Professor Heinz Wolff's Gravity	Microsoft Windows	November 14, 2008	Extra Mile Studios
Professor Heinz Wolff's Gravity	Nintendo DS	November 14, 2008	Extra Mile Studios
Ellen Whitaker's Horse Life	Nintendo DS	November 18, 2008	Neko Entertainment
Tecktonik: World Tour	Nintendo DS	November 21, 2008	Dancing Dots / Neko Entertainment
Let's Play: Schools	Nintendo DS	December 5, 2008	ZigZag Island
The Magic Roundabout	Microsoft Windows	December 19, 2008	Black Sheep Studio
The Magic Roundabout	Wii	December 19, 2008	Black Sheep Studio
Professor Heinz Wolff's Gravity	Wii	January 16, 2009	Extra Mile Studios
Pet Vet: Down Under	Nintendo DS	March 17, 2009	BrainGame
Mytran Wars	PlayStation Portable	April 17, 2009	StormRegion
Elite Forces: Unit 77	Nintendo DS	April 28, 2009	Abylight
Secret Files 2: Puritas Cordis	Nintendo DS	May 7, 2009	Keen Games
Secret Files 2: Puritas Cordis	Wii	May 7, 2009	Keen Games
Sacred 2: Fallen Angel	PlayStation 3	May 27, 2009	Ascaron Entertainment
Sacred 2: Fallen Angel	Xbox 360	May 27, 2009	Ascaron Entertainment
Train Your Brain with Dr. Kawashima	Microsoft Windows	June 12, 2009	Chimera Entertainment / Nikoli
Fritz Chess	Nintendo DS	June 30, 2009	Freedom Factory Studios
Fritz Chess	Wii	June 30, 2009	Freedom Factory Studios
Train Your Brain with Dr. Kawashima	Macintosh	July 10, 2009	Chimera Entertainment / Nikoli
The Whispered World	Microsoft Windows	August 28, 2009	Daedalic Entertainment
Cursed Mountain	Wii	September 4, 2009	Sproing Interactive / Deep Silver Vienna
Handball Manager 2010	Microsoft Windows	September 18, 2009	Netmin
The Humans: Meet the Ancestors!	Microsoft Windows	September 18, 2009	Blue Monkey Studios
The Humans: Meet the Ancestors!	Nintendo DS	September 18, 2009	Blue Monkey Studios
Astrology DS: The Stars in your Hands	Nintendo DS	September 22, 2009	Sproing Interactive
Risen	Microsoft Windows	October 2, 2009	Piranha Bytes
Risen	Xbox 360	October 2, 2009	Wizarbox
Carcassonne	Nintendo DS	October 23, 2009	Independent Arts Software
Inferno Pool	Xbox 360	October 29, 2009	Dark Energy Digital
DJ Star	Nintendo DS	November 10, 2009	Gamelife
Dead Mountaineer's Hotel	Microsoft Windows	November 27, 2009	Electronic Paradise
S.T.A.L.K.E.R.: Call of Pripyat	Microsoft Windows	February 2, 2010	GSC Game World
Cursed Mountain	Microsoft Windows	February 5, 2010	Sproing Interactive / Deep Silver Vienna
Prison Break: The Conspiracy	Microsoft Windows	March 30, 2010	ZootFly
Prison Break: The Conspiracy	PlayStation 3	March 30, 2010	ZootFly
Prison Break: The Conspiracy	Xbox 360	March 30, 2010	ZootFly
Let's Play Garden	Microsoft Windows	June 8, 2010	ZigZag Island
Let's Play Garden	Wii	June 8, 2010	ZigZag Island
Lost Horizon	Microsoft Windows	August 20, 2010	Animation Arts
Emergency 2012	Microsoft Windows	November 5, 2010	Quadriga Games
Wildlife Park 2: Farm World	Microsoft Windows	November 19, 2010	B-Alive
Nail'd	Microsoft Windows	November 30, 2010	Techland / Artifex Mundi
Nail'd	PlayStation 3	November 30, 2010	Techland / Artifex Mundi
Nail'd	Xbox 360	November 30, 2010	Techland / Artifex Mundi
Duke Nukem: Critical Mass	Nintendo DS	April 8, 2011	Frontline Studios
Dead Island	Microsoft Windows	September 6, 2011	Techland
Dead Island	PlayStation 3	September 6, 2011	Techland
Dead Island	Xbox 360	September 6, 2011	Techland
Risen 2: Dark Waters	Microsoft Windows	April 24, 2012	Piranha Bytes
Risen 2: Dark Waters - Treasure Isle	Microsoft Windows	April 27, 2012	Piranha Bytes
Iron Front: Liberation 1944	Microsoft Windows	May 25, 2012	X1 Software
Risen 2: Dark Waters - Air Temple	Microsoft Windows	May 25, 2012	Piranha Bytes
Summer Stars 2012	PlayStation 3	July 10, 2012	49Games
Summer Stars 2012	Wii	July 10, 2012	49Games
Summer Stars 2012	Xbox 360	July 10, 2012	49Games
Risen 2: Dark Waters	PlayStation 3	July 31, 2012	Wizarbox
Risen 2: Dark Waters	Xbox 360	July 31, 2012	Wizarbox
Secret Files 3	Microsoft Windows	September 14, 2012	Animation Arts / Creatown / Fusionsphere Systems
Emergency 2013	Microsoft Windows	November 9, 2012	Quadriga Games
Sacred Citadel	Microsoft Windows	April 17, 2013	SouthEnd Interactive
Sacred Citadel	PlayStation 3	April 17, 2013	SouthEnd Interactive
Sacred Citadel	Xbox 360	April 17, 2013	SouthEnd Interactive
Dead Island: Riptide	Microsoft Windows	April 23, 2013	Techland
Dead Island: Riptide	PlayStation 3	April 23, 2013	Techland
Dead Island: Riptide	Xbox 360	April 23, 2013	Techland
Metro: Last Light	Microsoft Windows	May 14, 2013	4A Games
Metro: Last Light	PlayStation 3	May 14, 2013	4A Games
Metro: Last Light	Xbox 360	May 14, 2013	4A Games
Ride to Hell: Retribution	Microsoft Windows	June 25, 2013	Eutechnyx
Ride to Hell: Retribution	PlayStation 3	June 25, 2013	Eutechnyx
Ride to Hell: Retribution	Xbox 360	June 25, 2013	Eutechnyx
Narco Terror	Microsoft Windows	July 31, 2013	ZootFly
Narco Terror	PlayStation 3	July 31, 2013	ZootFly
Narco Terror	Xbox 360	July 31, 2013	ZootFly
Saints Row IV	Microsoft Windows	August 20, 2013	Volition / Agora Games
Saints Row IV	PlayStation 3	August 20, 2013	Volition / Agora Games
Saints Row IV	Xbox 360	August 20, 2013	Volition / Agora Games
The Dark Eye: Memoria	Macintosh	August 30, 2013	Daedalic Entertainment
The Dark Eye: Memoria	Microsoft Windows	August 30, 2013	Daedalic Entertainment
Freefall Racers	Xbox 360	September 6, 2013	Smoking Gun Interactive
Metro: Last Light	Macintosh	September 10, 2013	4A Games
Let's Sing and Dance	Xbox 360	October 10, 2013	Voxler
Secret Files: Sam Peters	Microsoft Windows	October 18, 2013	Animation Arts / Fusionsphere Systems
Saints Row IV: Enter the Dominatrix	Microsoft Windows	October 22, 2013	Volition
Saints Row IV: Enter the Dominatrix	PlayStation 3	October 22, 2013	Volition
Saints Row IV: Enter the Dominatrix	Xbox 360	October 22, 2013	Volition
Galaxy on Fire: Alliances	iOS	November 21, 2013	Fishlabs
Saints Row IV: How the Saints Save Christmas	Microsoft Windows	December 10, 2013	Volition
Saints Row IV: How the Saints Save Christmas	PlayStation 3	December 10, 2013	Volition
Saints Row IV: How the Saints Save Christmas	Xbox 360	December 10, 2013	Volition
NASCAR '14	Microsoft Windows	February 18, 2014	Eutechnyx
NASCAR '14	PlayStation 3	February 18, 2014	Eutechnyx
NASCAR '14	Xbox 360	February 18, 2014	Eutechnyx
Killer Is Dead: Nightmare Edition	Microsoft Windows	May 23, 2014	Grasshopper Manufacture
Secret Files: Tunguska	iOS	July 15, 2014	Fishlabs
Sacred 3	Microsoft Windows	July 31, 2014	Keen Games
Sacred 3	PlayStation 3	July 31, 2014	Keen Games
Sacred 3	Xbox 360	July 31, 2014	Keen Games
Sacred 3: Underworld	Microsoft Windows	July 31, 2014	Keen Games
Risen 3: Titan Lords	Microsoft Windows	August 15, 2014	Piranha Bytes
Risen 3: Titan Lords	PlayStation 3	August 15, 2014	Piranha Bytes
Risen 3: Titan Lords	Xbox 360	August 15, 2014	Piranha Bytes
Metro Redux	Microsoft Windows	August 26, 2014	4A Games
Metro Redux	PlayStation 4	August 26, 2014	4A Games
Metro Redux	Xbox One	August 26, 2014	4A Games
Wasteland 2	Linux	September 30, 2014	InXile Entertainment
Wasteland 2	Macintosh	September 30, 2014	InXile Entertainment
Wasteland 2	Microsoft Windows	September 30, 2014	InXile Entertainment
Sacred 3: Orcland	Microsoft Windows	October 22, 2014	Keen Games
Secret Files: Sam Peters	iOS	October 29, 2014	Fishlabs
Escape Dead Island	Microsoft Windows	November 20, 2014	Fatshark
Escape Dead Island	PlayStation 3	November 20, 2014	Fatshark
Escape Dead Island	Xbox 360	November 20, 2014	Fatshark
Emergency 5	Microsoft Windows	November 28, 2014	Sixteen Tons Entertainment
Secret Files: Tunguska	Android	December 19, 2014	Fishlabs
Secret Files: Sam Peters	Android	January 13, 2015	Fishlabs
Saints Row: Gat out of Hell	Microsoft Windows	January 23, 2015	High Voltage Software / Volition
Saints Row: Gat out of Hell	PlayStation 3	January 23, 2015	High Voltage Software / Volition
Saints Row: Gat out of Hell	PlayStation 4	January 23, 2015	High Voltage Software / Volition
Saints Row: Gat out of Hell	Xbox 360	January 23, 2015	High Voltage Software / Volition
Saints Row: Gat out of Hell	Xbox One	January 23, 2015	High Voltage Software / Volition
Saints Row IV: Re-Elected	PlayStation 4	January 27, 2015	High Voltage Software
Saints Row IV: Re-Elected	Xbox One	January 27, 2015	High Voltage Software
Trainz: A New Era	Macintosh	May 14, 2015	N3V Games
Trainz: A New Era	Microsoft Windows	May 14, 2015	N3V Games
Risen 3: Titan Lords - Enhanced Edition	PlayStation 4	August 21, 2015	Piranha Bytes
Lost Horizon 2	Microsoft Windows	October 1, 2015	Animation Arts
Wasteland 2: Director's Cut	Microsoft Windows	October 13, 2015	InXile Entertainment
Wasteland 2: Director's Cut	Macintosh	October 13, 2015	InXile Entertainment
Wasteland 2: Director's Cut	Linux	October 13, 2015	InXile Entertainment
Wasteland 2: Director's Cut	PlayStation 4	October 13, 2015	InXile Entertainment
Wasteland 2: Director's Cut	Xbox One	October 13, 2015	InXile Entertainment
Emergency 2016	Microsoft Windows	October 16, 2015	Sixteen Tons Entertainment
Lost Horizon	iOS	November 11, 2015	Fishlabs
Lost Horizon	Android	December 10, 2015	Fishlabs
Galaxy on Fire: Manticore Rising	TvOS	December 16, 2015	Fishlabs
Saints Row IV	Linux	December 21, 2015	Volition / Agora Games
Saints Row IV: Enter the Dominatrix	Linux	December 21, 2015	Volition
Saints Row: Gat out of Hell	Linux	December 21, 2015	High Voltage Software / Volition
This War of Mine: The Little Ones	PlayStation 4	January 29, 2016	11 Bit Studios
This War of Mine: The Little Ones	Xbox One	January 29, 2016	11 Bit Studios
Homefront: The Revolution	Microsoft Windows	May 17, 2016	Dambuster Studios
Homefront: The Revolution	PlayStation 4	May 17, 2016	Dambuster Studios
Homefront: The Revolution	Xbox One	May 17, 2016	Dambuster Studios
Warp Shift	iOS	May 25, 2016	Isbit Games
Dead Island: Definitive Edition	Microsoft Windows	May 31, 2016	Techland
Dead Island: Definitive Edition	PlayStation 4	May 31, 2016	Techland
Dead Island: Definitive Edition	Xbox One	May 31, 2016	Techland
Dead Island: Retro Revenge	Microsoft Windows	June 1, 2016	Empty Clip Studios
Deadlight: Director's Cut	Microsoft Windows	June 21, 2016	Tequila Works / Abstraction Games
Deadlight: Director's Cut	PlayStation 4	June 21, 2016	Tequila Works / Abstraction Games
Deadlight: Director's Cut	Xbox One	June 21, 2016	Tequila Works / Abstraction Games
Mighty No. 9	Microsoft Windows	June 21, 2016	Inti Creates / Comcept
Mighty No. 9	PlayStation 3	June 21, 2016	Inti Creates / Comcept
Mighty No. 9	PlayStation 4	June 21, 2016	Inti Creates / Comcept
Mighty No. 9	Wii U	June 21, 2016	Inti Creates / Comcept
Mighty No. 9	Xbox One	June 21, 2016	Inti Creates / Comcept
Warp Shift	Android	July 18, 2016	Isbit Games
Secret Files: Tunguska	Wii U	July 28, 2016	Fusionsphere Systems
Dead Island: Retro Revenge	PlayStation 4	August 1, 2016	Empty Clip Studios
Dead Island: Retro Revenge	Xbox One	August 1, 2016	Empty Clip Studios
Sacred Legends	Android	August 24, 2016	Chimera Entertainment
Sacred Legends	iOS	August 24, 2016	Chimera Entertainment
Homefront: The Revolution - The Voice of Freedom	Microsoft Windows	September 28, 2016	Dambuster Studios
Homefront: The Revolution - The Voice of Freedom	PlayStation 4	September 28, 2016	Dambuster Studios
Homefront: The Revolution - The Voice of Freedom	Xbox One	September 28, 2016	Dambuster Studios
Homefront: The Revolution - Aftermath	Microsoft Windows	November 9, 2016	Dambuster Studios
Homefront: The Revolution - Aftermath	PlayStation 4	November 9, 2016	Dambuster Studios
Homefront: The Revolution - Aftermath	Xbox One	November 9, 2016	Dambuster Studios
Galaxy on Fire 3: Manticore	iOS	December 7, 2016	Fishlabs
The Book of Unwritten Tales 2	Android	February 7, 2017	Fishlabs
The Book of Unwritten Tales 2	iOS	February 7, 2017	Fishlabs
Galaxy on Fire: Alliances	Android	February 23, 2017	Fishlabs
Homefront: The Revolution - Beyond the Walls	Microsoft Windows	March 8, 2017	Dambuster Studios
Homefront: The Revolution - Beyond the Walls	PlayStation 4	March 8, 2017	Dambuster Studios
Homefront: The Revolution - Beyond the Walls	Xbox One	March 8, 2017	Dambuster Studios
APB: Reloaded	PlayStation 4	March 31, 2017	Reloaded Productions
Dreamfall Chapters	PlayStation 4	May 5, 2017	Red Thread Games
Dreamfall Chapters	Xbox One	May 5, 2017	Red Thread Games
Jumping Joe!	iOS	May 8, 2017	Power Up Game Studio
Jumping Joe!	Android	May 10, 2017	Power Up Game Studio
Galaxy on Fire 3: Manticore	Android	May 17, 2017	Fishlabs
Secret Files 2: Puritas Cordis	iOS	August 2, 2017	Animation Arts / Fusionsphere Systems
Agents of Mayhem	Microsoft Windows	August 15, 2017	Volition
Agents of Mayhem	PlayStation 4	August 15, 2017	Volition
Agents of Mayhem	Xbox One	August 15, 2017	Volition
Lost Horizon 2	iOS	February 8, 2018	Animation Arts
Kingdom Come: Deliverance	Microsoft Windows	February 13, 2018	Warhorse Studios
Kingdom Come: Deliverance	PlayStation 4	February 13, 2018	Warhorse Studios
Kingdom Come: Deliverance	Xbox One	February 13, 2018	Warhorse Studios
Manticore: Galaxy on Fire	Nintendo Switch	April 19, 2018	Deep Silver Fishlabs
Lost Horizon 2	Android	May 8, 2018	Animation Arts
Dead Island: Survivors	Android	July 4, 2018	Deep Silver Fishlabs
Dead Island: Survivors	iOS	July 4, 2018	Deep Silver Fishlabs
Dakar 18	Microsoft Windows	September 25, 2018	BigMoon Entertainment
Pathfinder: Kingmaker	Linux	September 25, 2018	Owlcat Games
Pathfinder: Kingmaker	Macintosh	September 25, 2018	Owlcat Games
Pathfinder: Kingmaker	Microsoft Windows	September 25, 2018	Owlcat Games
Dakar 18	PlayStation 4	October 26, 2018	BigMoon Entertainment
Dakar 18	Xbox One	October 26, 2018	BigMoon Entertainment
Kingdom Come: Deliverance – The Amorous Adventures of Bold Sir Hans Capon	Microsoft Windows	October 26, 2018	Warhorse Studios
Kingdom Come: Deliverance – The Amorous Adventures of Bold Sir Hans Capon	PlayStation 4	October 26, 2018	Warhorse Studios
Kingdom Come: Deliverance – The Amorous Adventures of Bold Sir Hans Capon	Xbox One	October 26, 2018	Warhorse Studios
This War of Mine: Complete Edition	Nintendo Switch	November 27, 2018	11 Bit Studios
Secret Files: Tunguska	Nintendo Switch	November 30, 2018	Fusionsphere Systems
Kingdom Come: Deliverance - Band of Bastards	Microsoft Windows	February 5, 2019	Warhorse Studios
Kingdom Come: Deliverance - Band of Bastards	PlayStation 4	February 5, 2019	Warhorse Studios
Kingdom Come: Deliverance - Band of Bastards	Xbox One	February 5, 2019	Warhorse Studios
Metro Exodus	Microsoft Windows	February 15, 2019	4A Games
Metro Exodus	PlayStation 4	February 15, 2019	4A Games
Metro Exodus	Xbox One	February 15, 2019	4A Games
Pathfinder: Kingmaker – Varnhold's Lot	Linux	February 28, 2019	Owlcat Games
Pathfinder: Kingmaker – Varnhold's Lot	Macintosh	February 28, 2019	Owlcat Games
Pathfinder: Kingmaker – Varnhold's Lot	Microsoft Windows	February 28, 2019	Owlcat Games
Outward	Microsoft Windows	March 26, 2019	Nine Dots Studio
Outward	PlayStation 4	March 26, 2019	Nine Dots Studio
Outward	Xbox One	March 26, 2019	Nine Dots Studio
Saints Row: The Third - The Full Package	Nintendo Switch	May 10, 2019	Deep Silver Fishlabs
Kingdom Come: Deliverance – A Woman's Lot	Microsoft Windows	May 29, 2019	Warhorse Studios
Kingdom Come: Deliverance – A Woman's Lot	PlayStation 4	June 11, 2019	Warhorse Studios
Kingdom Come: Deliverance – A Woman's Lot	Xbox One	June 11, 2019	Warhorse Studios
Secret Files 2: Puritas Cordis	Nintendo Switch	June 20, 2019	Animation Arts / Fusionsphere Systems
Metro Exodus - The Two Colonels	Microsoft Windows	August 20, 2019	4A Games
Metro Exodus - The Two Colonels	PlayStation 4	August 20, 2019	4A Games
Metro Exodus - The Two Colonels	Xbox One	August 20, 2019	4A Games
Secret Files: Sam Peters	Nintendo Switch	October 10, 2019	Animation Arts / Fusionsphere Systems
Let's Sing Country	Nintendo Switch	October 25, 2019	Voxler
Let's Sing Country	PlayStation 4	October 25, 2019	Voxler
Let's Sing Country	Xbox One	October 25, 2019	Voxler
Metro Exodus	Stadia	November 19, 2019	4A Games
Metro Exodus - The Two Colonels	Stadia	November 19, 2019	4A Games
Shenmue III	Microsoft Windows	November 19, 2019	Neilo / Ys Net
Shenmue III	PlayStation 4	November 19, 2019	Neilo / Ys Net
Hunt: Showdown	Xbox One	January 16, 2020	Crytek
Metro Exodus - Sam's Story	Microsoft Windows	February 11, 2020	4A Games
Metro Exodus - Sam's Story	PlayStation 4	February 11, 2020	4A Games
Metro Exodus - Sam's Story	Stadia	February 11, 2020	4A Games
Metro Exodus - Sam's Story	Xbox One	February 11, 2020	4A Games
Hunt: Showdown	PlayStation 4	February 18, 2020	Crytek
Shenmue III: Story Quest Pack	Microsoft Windows	February 18, 2020	Neilo / Ys Net
Shenmue III: Story Quest Pack	PlayStation 4	February 18, 2020	Neilo / Ys Net
Metro Redux	Nintendo Switch	February 28, 2020	4A Games
Lost Horizon	Nintendo Switch	March 4, 2020	Animation Arts
Kingdom Come: Deliverance	GeForce Now	March 10, 2020	Warhorse Studios
Kingdom Come: Deliverance – A Woman's Lot	GeForce Now	March 10, 2020	Warhorse Studios
Kingdom Come: Deliverance - Band of Bastards	GeForce Now	March 10, 2020	Warhorse Studios
Kingdom Come: Deliverance – The Amorous Adventures of Bold Sir Hans Capon	GeForce Now	March 10, 2020	Warhorse Studios
Shenmue III: Big Merry Cruise	Microsoft Windows	March 17, 2020	Neilo / Ys Net
Shenmue III: Big Merry Cruise	PlayStation 4	March 17, 2020	Neilo / Ys Net
Secret Files 3	iOS	March 24, 2020	Animation Arts
Saints Row IV: Re-Elected	Nintendo Switch	March 27, 2020	Deep Silver Fishlabs
Secret Files 3	Android	April 17, 2020	Animation Arts
Dead Island: Riptide - Definitive Edition	GeForce Now	May 14, 2020	Techland
Risen 2: Dark Waters	GeForce Now	May 14, 2020	Piranha Bytes
Risen 2: Dark Waters – Air Temple	GeForce Now	May 14, 2020	Piranha Bytes
Risen 2: Dark Waters – Treasure Isle	GeForce Now	May 14, 2020	Piranha Bytes
Saints Row: The Third Remastered	Microsoft Windows	May 22, 2020	Sperasoft
Saints Row: The Third Remastered	PlayStation 4	May 22, 2020	Sperasoft
Saints Row: The Third Remastered	Xbox One	May 22, 2020	Sperasoft
Lost Horizon 2	Nintendo Switch	June 10, 2020	Animation Arts
Metro Redux	Stadia	June 23, 2020	4A Games
Sacred 2: Fallen Angel	GeForce Now	July 5, 2020	Ascaron
Sacred 2: Fallen Angel – Ice & Blood	GeForce Now	July 5, 2020	Ascaron
Pathfinder: Kingmaker - Definitive Edition	PlayStation 4	August 18, 2020	Owlcat Games
Pathfinder: Kingmaker - Definitive Edition	Xbox One	August 18, 2020	Owlcat Games
Wasteland 3	Microsoft Windows	August 28, 2020	InXile Entertainment
Wasteland 3	PlayStation 4	August 28, 2020	InXile Entertainment
Wasteland 3	Xbox One	August 28, 2020	InXile Entertainment
Windbound	Microsoft Windows	August 28, 2020	5 Lives Studios
Windbound	Nintendo Switch	August 28, 2020	5 Lives Studios
Windbound	PlayStation 4	August 28, 2020	5 Lives Studios
Windbound	Xbox One	August 28, 2020	5 Lives Studios
Windbound	Stadia	August 28, 2020	5 Lives Studios
Iron Harvest	Microsoft Windows	September 1, 2020	King Art Games
Secret Files 3	Nintendo Switch	September 3, 2020	Animation Arts
Metro Exodus	Amazon Luna	October 20, 2020	4A Games
Metro Exodus - Sam's Story	Amazon Luna	October 20, 2020	4A Games
Metro Exodus - The Two Colonels	Amazon Luna	October 20, 2020	4A Games
Maneater	Xbox Series X/S	November 10, 2020	Tripwire Interactive
Maneater	PlayStation 5	November 12, 2020	Tripwire Interactive
Outward	Stadia	November 30, 2020	Nine Dots Studio
Outward: The Two Brothers	Microsoft Windows	December 15, 2020	Nine Dots Studio
Iron Harvest: Rusviet Revolution	Microsoft Windows	December 17, 2020	King Art Games
Wasteland 3	Linux	December 17, 2020	InXile Entertainment
Wasteland 3	Macintosh	December 17, 2020	InXile Entertainment
Gods Will Fall	Microsoft Windows	January 29, 2021	Clever Beans
Gods Will Fall	Nintendo Switch	January 29, 2021	Clever Beans
Gods Will Fall	PlayStation 4	January 29, 2021	Clever Beans
Gods Will Fall	Stadia	January 29, 2021	Clever Beans
Gods Will Fall	Xbox One	January 29, 2021	Clever Beans
Saints Row: The Third Remastered	Stadia	March 5, 2021	Sperasoft
Kingdom Come: Deliverance	Amazon Luna	March 18, 2021	Warhorse Studios
Kingdom Come: Deliverance – A Woman's Lot	Amazon Luna	March 18, 2021	Warhorse Studios
Kingdom Come: Deliverance - Band of Bastards	Amazon Luna	March 18, 2021	Warhorse Studios
Kingdom Come: Deliverance – The Amorous Adventures of Bold Sir Hans Capon	Amazon Luna	March 18, 2021	Warhorse Studios
Metro Exodus	Linux	April 14, 2021	4A Games
Metro Exodus	Macintosh	April 14, 2021	4A Games
Metro Exodus - Sam's Story	Linux	April 14, 2021	4A Games
Metro Exodus - Sam's Story	Macintosh	April 14, 2021	4A Games
Metro Exodus - The Two Colonels	Linux	April 14, 2021	4A Games
Metro Exodus - The Two Colonels	Macintosh	April 14, 2021	4A Games
Metro Exodus - Enhanced Edition	Microsoft Windows	May 6, 2021	4A Games
Gods Will Fall: Valley of the Dormant Gods – Part 1	Microsoft Windows	May 18, 2021	Clever Beans
Gods Will Fall: Valley of the Dormant Gods – Part 1	Nintendo Switch	May 18, 2021	Clever Beans
Gods Will Fall: Valley of the Dormant Gods – Part 1	PlayStation 4	May 18, 2021	Clever Beans
Gods Will Fall: Valley of the Dormant Gods – Part 1	Stadia	May 18, 2021	Clever Beans
Gods Will Fall: Valley of the Dormant Gods – Part 1	Xbox One	May 18, 2021	Clever Beans
Outward: The Three Brothers	PlayStation 4	May 18, 2021	Nine Dots Studio
Outward: The Three Brothers	Stadia	May 18, 2021	Nine Dots Studio
Outward: The Three Brothers	Xbox One	May 18, 2021	Nine Dots Studio
Saint Row: The Third Remastered	GeForce Now	May 25, 2021	Sperasoft
Saint Row: The Third Remastered	PlayStation 5	May 25, 2021	Sperasoft
Saint Row: The Third Remastered	Xbox Series X/S	May 25, 2021	Sperasoft
Iron Harvest: Operation Eagle	Microsoft Windows	May 27, 2021	King Art Games
Wasteland 3: The Battle of Steeltown	Linux	June 3, 2021	InXile Entertainment
Wasteland 3: The Battle of Steeltown	Macintosh	June 3, 2021	InXile Entertainment
Wasteland 3: The Battle of Steeltown	Microsoft Windows	June 3, 2021	InXile Entertainment
X3: Reunion	GeForce Now	June 3, 2021	Egosoft
Chivalry 2	GeForce Now	June 8, 2021	Tripwire Interactive
Chivalry 2	Microsoft Windows	June 8, 2021	Tripwire Interactive
Chivalry 2	PlayStation 4	June 8, 2021	Tripwire Interactive
Chivalry 2	PlayStation 5	June 8, 2021	Tripwire Interactive
Chivalry 2	Xbox One	June 8, 2021	Tripwire Interactive
Chivalry 2	Xbox Series X/S	June 8, 2021	Tripwire Interactive
Wasteland 3: The Battle of Steeltown	PlayStation 4	June 9, 2021	InXile Entertainment
Wasteland 3: The Battle of Steeltown	Xbox One	June 9, 2021	InXile Entertainment
Metro Exodus Complete Edition	PlayStation 5	June 18, 2021	4A Games
Metro Exodus Complete Edition	Xbox Series X/S	June 18, 2021	4A Games
Gods Will Fall: Valley of the Dormant Gods – Part 2	Microsoft Windows	June 30, 2021	Clever Beans
Gods Will Fall: Valley of the Dormant Gods – Part 2	Nintendo Switch	June 30, 2021	Clever Beans
Gods Will Fall: Valley of the Dormant Gods – Part 2	PlayStation 4	June 30, 2021	Clever Beans
Gods Will Fall: Valley of the Dormant Gods – Part 2	Stadia	June 30, 2021	Clever Beans
Gods Will Fall: Valley of the Dormant Gods – Part 2	Xbox One	June 30, 2021	Clever Beans
Saints Row: The Third Remastered	Amazon Luna	July 29, 2021	Sperasoft
Gods Will Fall: Valley of the Dormant Gods – Part 3	Microsoft Windows	August 31, 2021	Clever Beans
Gods Will Fall: Valley of the Dormant Gods – Part 3	Nintendo Switch	August 31, 2021	Clever Beans
Gods Will Fall: Valley of the Dormant Gods – Part 3	PlayStation 4	August 31, 2021	Clever Beans
Gods Will Fall: Valley of the Dormant Gods – Part 3	Stadia	August 31, 2021	Clever Beans
Gods Will Fall: Valley of the Dormant Gods – Part 3	Xbox One	August 31, 2021	Clever Beans
Saints Row IV: Re-Elected	Stadia	November 1, 2021	Deep Silver Volition
Chorus	Amazon Luna	December 3, 2021	Deep Silver Fishlabs, Deep Silver Dambuster Studios
Chorus	GeForce Now	December 3, 2021	Deep Silver Fishlabs, Deep Silver Dambuster Studios
Chorus	Microsoft Windows	December 3, 2021	Deep Silver Fishlabs, Deep Silver Dambuster Studios
Chorus	PlayStation 4	December 3, 2021	Deep Silver Fishlabs, Deep Silver Dambuster Studios
Chorus	PlayStation 5	December 3, 2021	Deep Silver Fishlabs, Deep Silver Dambuster Studios
Chorus	Stadia	December 3, 2021	Deep Silver Fishlabs, Deep Silver Dambuster Studios
Chorus	Xbox One	December 3, 2021	Deep Silver Fishlabs, Deep Silver Dambuster Studios
Chorus	Xbox Series X/S	December 3, 2021	Deep Silver Fishlabs, Deep Silver Dambuster Studios
Metro: Exodus – Enhanced Edition	GeForce Now	January 27, 2022	4A Games
Saints Row: Boss Factory	Microsoft Windows	June 9, 2022	Deep Silver Volition
Saints Row: Boss Factory	PlayStation 4	June 9, 2022	Deep Silver Volition
Saints Row: Boss Factory	PlayStation 5	June 9, 2022	Deep Silver Volition
Saints Row: Boss Factory	Xbox One	June 9, 2022	Deep Silver Volition
Saints Row: Boss Factory	Xbox Series X/S	June 9, 2022	Deep Silver Volition
Saints Row	Microsoft Windows	August 23, 2022	Deep Silver Volition
Saints Row	PlayStation 4	August 23, 2022	Deep Silver Volition
Saints Row	PlayStation 5	August 23, 2022	Deep Silver Volition
Saints Row	Xbox One	August 23, 2022	Deep Silver Volition
Saints Row	Xbox Series X/S	August 23, 2022	Deep Silver Volition
Dead Island 2	Alexa Game Control	April 28, 2023	Deep Silver Dambuster Studios, Deep Silver Fishlabs
Dead Island 2	Microsoft Windows	April 28, 2023	Deep Silver Dambuster Studios, Deep Silver Fishlabs
Dead Island 2	PlayStation 4	April 28, 2023	Deep Silver Dambuster Studios, Deep Silver Fishlabs
Dead Island 2	PlayStation 5	April 28, 2023	Deep Silver Dambuster Studios, Deep Silver Fishlabs
Dead Island 2	Xbox One	April 28, 2023	Deep Silver Dambuster Studios, Deep Silver Fishlabs
Dead Island 2	Xbox Series X/S	April 28, 2023	Deep Silver Dambuster Studios, Deep Silver Fishlabs
Beyond Contact	Microsoft Windows	April 4, 2023	PlayCorp Studios
Saints Row - A Song of Ice and Dust	Microsoft Windows	August 8, 2023	Deep Silver Volition
Saints Row - A Song of Ice and Dust	PlayStation 4	August 8, 2023	Deep Silver Volition
Saints Row - A Song of Ice and Dust	PlayStation 5	August 8, 2023	Deep Silver Volition
Saints Row - A Song of Ice and Dust	Xbox One	August 8, 2023	Deep Silver Volition
Saints Row - A Song of Ice and Dust	Xbox Series X/S	August 8, 2023	Deep Silver Volition
Payday 3	Microsoft Windows	September 9, 2023	Starbreeze Studios
Payday 3	PlayStation 5	September 9, 2023	Starbreeze Studios
Payday 3	Xbox Series X/S	September 9, 2023	Starbreeze Studios
Dead Island 2 - HAUS	Microsoft Windows	November 2, 2023	Deep Silver Dambuster Studios, Deep Silver Fishlabs
Dead Island 2 - HAUS	PlayStation 4	November 2, 2023	Deep Silver Dambuster Studios, Deep Silver Fishlabs
Dead Island 2 - HAUS	PlayStation 5	November 2, 2023	Deep Silver Dambuster Studios, Deep Silver Fishlabs
Dead Island 2 - HAUS	Xbox One	November 2, 2023	Deep Silver Dambuster Studios, Deep Silver Fishlabs
Dead Island 2 - HAUS	Xbox Series X/S	November 2, 2023	Deep Silver Dambuster Studios, Deep Silver Fishlabs
Kingdom Come: Deliverance	Nintendo Switch	March 15, 2024	Warhorse Studios
Undisputed	Microsoft Windows	November 10, 2024	Steel City Interactive
Undisputed	PlayStation 5	November 10, 2024	Steel City Interactive
Undisputed	Xbox Series X/S	November 10, 2024	Steel City Interactive
Metro Awakening	Meta Quest 2	November 7, 2024	Vertigo Games
Metro Awakening	Meta Quest Pro	November 7, 2024	Vertigo Games
Metro Awakening	Meta Quest 3	November 7, 2024	Vertigo Games
Metro Awakening	Microsoft Windows	November 7, 2024	Vertigo Games
Metro Awakening	PlayStation VR2	November 7, 2024	Vertigo Games
Kingdom Come: Deliverance II	Microsoft Windows	February 4, 2025	Warhorse Studios
Kingdom Come: Deliverance II	PlayStation 5	February 4, 2025	Warhorse Studios
Kingdom Come: Deliverance II	Xbox Series X/S	February 4, 2025	Warhorse Studios
Echoes of the End	Microsoft Windows	August 12, 2025	Myrkur Games
Echoes of the End	PlayStation 5	August 12, 2025	Myrkur Games
Echoes of the End	Xbox Series X/S	August 12, 2025	Myrkur Games
Metal Eden	Microsoft Windows	September 2, 2025	Reikon Games
Metal Eden	PlayStation 5	September 2, 2025	Reikon Games
Metal Eden	Xbox Series X/S	September 2, 2025	Reikon Games
Kingdom Come: Deliverance	PlayStation 5	February 13, 2026	Warhorse Studios
Kingdom Come: Deliverance	Xbox Series X/S	February 13, 2026	Warhorse Studios
Warhammer 40,000: Dawn of War IV	Microsoft Windows	December 3, 2026	King Art Games
Metro 2039	Microsoft Windows	February 4, 2027	4A Games
Metro 2039	PlayStation 5	February 4, 2027	4A Games
Metro 2039	Xbox Series X/S	February 4, 2027	4A Games
TimeSplitters	NA	Canceled	Free Radical Design

== Distributed titles ==
Title	Platform(s)	Release date	Developer(s)
Cold Zero: No Mercy	Microsoft Windows	September 5, 2003	Drago Entertainment
Anarchy Online: Shadowlands	Microsoft Windows	September 17, 2003	Funcom
Once Upon a Knight	Microsoft Windows	September 25, 2003	Reality Pump
Wildlife Park	Microsoft Windows	September 26, 2003	B-Alive
Chrome	Microsoft Windows	October 9, 2003	Techland
Wildlife Park: Wild Creatures	Microsoft Windows	2003	B-Alive
Etherlords II	Microsoft Windows	March 5, 2004	Nival
I of the Dragon	Microsoft Windows	March 10, 2004	Primal Software
TrackMania	Microsoft Windows	May 21, 2004	Nadeo
Two Thrones	Microsoft Windows	May 21, 2004	Paradox Entertainment
Anarchy Online: Alien Invasion	Microsoft Windows	September 1, 2004	Funcom
Advanced Battlegrounds: The Future of Combat	Microsoft Windows	September 23, 2004	Techland
Xpand Rally	Microsoft Windows	October 1, 2004	Techland
Shade: Wrath of Angels	Microsoft Windows	November 26, 2004	Black Element Software
TrackMania Sunrise	Microsoft Windows	April 26, 2005	Nadeo
Chrome SpecForce	Microsoft Windows	June 2, 2005	Techland
Shopping Centre Tycoon	Microsoft Windows	June 2, 2005	Virtual Programming
Ski Racing 2006 featuring Hermann Maier	Microsoft Windows	November 25, 2005	Coldwood Interactive
GTI Racing	Microsoft Windows	May 5, 2006	Prominence / Techland
First Battalion	Xbox	May 12, 2006	ZootFly
Birth of America	Microsoft Windows	September 1, 2006	Societe En Participation
Heroes of Annihilated Empires	Microsoft Windows	October 6, 2006	GSC Game World
Mage Knight: Apocalypse	Microsoft Windows	October 12, 2006	InterServ International
Crusty Demons	PlayStation 2	November 24, 2006	The Climax Group
Dunes of War	Microsoft Windows	January 26, 2007	ZootFly
The Hustle: Detroit Streets	PlayStation Portable	March 2, 2007	Blade Interactive
Stranger	Microsoft Windows	November 23, 2007	Fireglow Games
TrackMania United	Microsoft Windows	2007	Nadeo
Warhammer: Mark of Chaos - Battle March	Microsoft Windows	May 16, 2008	Black Hole Entertainment
Dreamer Series: Babysitter	Nintendo DS	December 5, 2008	ZigZag Island
Dreamer Series: Shop Owner	Nintendo DS	December 5, 2008	ZigZag Island
Line Rider 2: Unbound	Wii	July 31, 2009	InXile Entertainment
Lead and Gold: Gangs of the Wild West	Microsoft Windows	April 30, 2010	Fatshark
Arsenal of Democracy	Microsoft Windows	May 21, 2010	BL-Logic
Rise of Prussia	Microsoft Windows	May 21, 2010	AGEOD Sarl
A New Beginning	Microsoft Windows	October 8, 2010	Daedalic Entertainment
Wildlife Park 3	Microsoft Windows	March 25, 2011	B-Alive
Military Life: Tank Simulator	Microsoft Windows	2011	ActaLogic
Defenders of Ardania	Xbox Live Arcade	March 14, 2012	Most Wanted Entertainment
Game of Thrones	Microsoft Windows	June 8, 2012	Cyanide
Game of Thrones	PlayStation 3	June 8, 2012	Cyanide
Game of Thrones	Xbox 360	June 8, 2012	Cyanide
Louisiana Adventure	Microsoft Windows	November 16, 2012	SilverPlay Entertainment
Broken Sword 5: The Serpent's Curse	PlayStation 4	September 4, 2015	Revolution Software
The King of Fighters XIV	PlayStation 4	August 26, 2016	SNK Playmore
7th Dragon III: Code:VFD	Nintendo 3DS	December 2, 2016	Sega CS3
Shin Megami Tensei IV: Apocalypse	Nintendo 3DS	December 2, 2016	Atlus
Persona 5	PlayStation 4	April 14, 2017	Atlus
Puyo Puyo Tetris	Nintendo Switch	April 27, 2017	Sonic Team
Valkyria Revolution	PlayStation 4	June 30, 2017	Media Vision
Valkyria Revolution	Xbox One	June 30, 2017	Media Vision
Yakuza: Kiwami	PlayStation 4	August 29, 2017	Ryu Ga Gotoku Studio
Utawarerumono: Mask of Truth	PlayStation Vita	September 5, 2017	Aquaplus
F1 2017	PlayStation 4	October 17, 2017	Codemasters Birmingham
F1 2017	Xbox One	October 17, 2017	Codemasters Birmingham
Etrian Odyssey V: Beyond the Myth	Nintendo 3DS	November 3, 2017	Atlus
Radiant Historia: Perfect Chronology	Nintendo 3DS	February 16, 2018	Atlus
Yakuza 6: The Song of Life	PlayStation 4	April 17, 2018	Sega
Conan Exiles	Microsoft Windows	May 8, 2018	Funcom
Conan Exiles	PlayStation 4	May 8, 2018	Funcom
Conan Exiles	Xbox One	May 8, 2018	Funcom
Shin Megami Tensei: Strange Journey Redux	Nintendo 3DS	May 18, 2018	Atlus
Yakuza Kiwami 2	PlayStation 4	August 28, 2018	Sega
Etrian Odyssey Nexus	Nintendo 3DS	February 5, 2019	Atlus
Persona Q2: New Cinema Labyrinth	Nintendo 3DS	June 4, 2019	Atlus
The Bard's Tale IV: Director's Cut	PlayStation 4	August 27, 2019	InXile Entertainment
The Bard's Tale IV: Director's Cut	Xbox One	August 27, 2019	InXile Entertainment
Grid	PlayStation 4	October 11, 2019	Codemasters
Grid	Xbox One	October 11, 2019	Codemasters
Grid	Stadia	October 11, 2019	Codemasters
Maneater	Microsoft Windows	May 22, 2020	Tripwire Interactive
Maneater	PlayStation 4	May 22, 2020	Tripwire Interactive
Maneater	Xbox One	May 22, 2020	Tripwire Interactive
Maneater	Nintendo Switch	May 25, 2021	Tripwire Interactive
