= Fishlabs =

German video game developer

Fishlabs GmbH
- Type: Subsidiary
- Industry: Video games
- Founded: 2004; 22 years ago
- Founders: Michael Schade; Christian Lohr
- Headquarters: Hamburg, Germany
- Products: Galaxy on Fire; Chorus
- Number of employees: 70 (2024)
- Parent: Deep Silver (2013–present)
- Website: fishlabs.de

Fishlabs GmbH (formerly Fishlabs Entertainment GmbH and Deep Silver Fishlabs) is a German video game developer based in Hamburg. Founded in 2004 by Michael Schade and Christian Lohr, the studio is best known for its Galaxy on Fire series. Following a brief bankruptcy proceeding, Fishlabs was acquired by Koch Media and reorganized as part of their game publishing label Deep Silver.

== History ==
Michael Schade and Christian Lohr opened Fishlabs in 2004, incorporated under the name Fishlabs Entertainment GmbH. That same year, the company received a round of financing, which allowed them to pay for development expenses for several years while generating revenue from their releases. It developed advergames like Barclaycard's Waterslide Extreme. In May 2010, Fishlabs planned a series B round and announced its plans to move into the massively multiplayer online games market.

By mid-2013, Fishlabs had run out of money; in October, 25 jobs were cut before the company went into self-administration. On 2 December, media company Koch Media announced that it had acquired Fishlabs, which would henceforth operate as the dedicated mobile studio for its game publishing label, Deep Silver. As the agreement was an asset deal, all of Fishlabs' assets, including 52 employees, were transferred to Koch Media and incorporated in a new division, called Deep Silver Fishlabs. The company's former legal entity, Fishlabs Entertainment GmbH, was to be dissolved, and both founders left the company. Schade and Lohr left the company and founded Everspace developer Rockfish Games. As result of the change in ownership, and the associated financial stability, Fishlabs also moved into video game publishing.

In March 2022, Fishlabs received €5.5 million in funding from the German government for the company's Project Black. Described as a third-person action game, the project was expected to be completed by August 2026. By January 2023, the company employed 95 people. In September, Embracer Group, the parent company of Koch Media (now known as Plaion), underwent cost cutting restructuring. Project Black was cancelled and about 12 employees were laid off.

Fishlabs then pitched a new Red Faction game following the closure of series developer Volition. Despite initial positive reception, the title was cancelled in November 2023 and around 50 Fishlabs employees were laid off.

== List of video games ==
Year	Title	Platform(s)
2005	Robot Alliance	J2ME, Symbian
2005	Speed Spirit	J2ME, Symbian
2005	Cloud Commander	J2ME, Symbian
2005	Motoraver 3D	J2ME, Symbian
2005	Galaxy on Fire	iOS, Symbian, J2ME, Android, Zeebo
2006	Star Wars: Imperial Ace	J2ME, Symbian
2006	Heli Strike: Advanced Air Combat	J2ME, Symbian
2006	Planet Riders	J2ME, Symbian
2007	DEEP: Submarine Odyssey	J2ME, Symbian
2007	Blades & Magic	J2ME, Symbian
2008	Powerboat Challenge	iOS, J2ME, Zeebo
2008	Gladiator	J2ME, Symbian
2008	Toy Tanks	J2ME, Symbian
2008	Rally Master Pro	iOS, J2ME, Symbian, Zeebo
2008	Snowboard Hero	iOS, Symbian, J2ME
2009	Burning Tires	J2ME, Symbian
2009	Galaxy on Fire 2	J2ME, Android, Macintosh, iOS, PC
2011	Sports Car Challenge	iOS, Android
2013	Galaxy on Fire: Alliances	iOS, Android
2013	Sports Car Challenge 2	iOS, Android
2014	Secret Files: Sam Peters	iOS, Android
2014	Secret Files: Tunguska	iOS, Android
2015	Galaxy on Fire: Manticore Rising	TvOS
2015	Lost Horizon	Android, iOS
2015	Secret Files: Sam Peters	Android
2016	Galaxy on Fire 3: Manticore	iOS
2016	Sacred Legends	Android, iOS
2016	The Interactive Adventures of Dog Mendonça & Pizza Boy	Android, iOS
2017	Galaxy on Fire 3: Manticore	Android
2017	Galaxy on Fire: Alliances	Android
2018	Dead Island: Survivors	Android, iOS
2018	Manticore: Galaxy on Fire	iOS, Android, Nintendo Switch, TvOS
2019	Saints Row: The Third - The Full Package	Nintendo Switch, Stadia
2020	Saints Row IV: Re-Elected	Nintendo Switch, Stadia
2021	Chorus	Windows, PlayStation 4, PlayStation 5, Stadia, Amazon Luna, Xbox One, Xbox Series X/S
2022	Saints Row	Stadia
2022	Goat Simulator 3	PlayStation 5, Xbox Series X/S, PlayStation 4, Xbox One, Nintendo Switch, Amazon Luna, Nintendo Switch 2
2023	Dead Island 2	Windows, PlayStation 4, Xbox One, PlayStation 5, Xbox Series X/S, macOS, Amazon Luna
2023	Valheim	Xbox One, Xbox Series X/S
2024	Goat Simulator: Remastered	Windows, PlayStation 5, Xbox Series X/S
2025	Satisfactory	PlayStation 5, Xbox Series X/S
