= Burning Tires 3D =

2009 mobile game

- Developer: Deep Silver Fishlabs
- Platforms: iOS, Android, Symbian OS, J2ME
- Release: January 13, 2009
- Mode: Single-player

Burning Tires 3D is an iOS racing game developed by German studio Deep Silver Fishlabs and released January 13, 2009.

== Critical reception ==
SlideToPlay gave it a 2 out of 5, commenting " Burning Tires 3D is a good game for younger players, but anyone who can see an R-rated movie will get mighty bored mighty fast. " PocketGamer gave the iPhone version 5/10 writing "Uninspiring level designs and unadventurous gameplay conspire to spoil the few moments of fun this game tries to pack in"., 6/10 for the mobile version writing "A pretty 3D racing game that unfortunately plays as bad as it looks good", and 5/10 for the Android version writing "Caught between cutesy kart racing and something more sober, Burning Tires fails to satisfy either camp with bland design, poor handling, and frustrating physics". AllAboutSymbian said "While Burning Tires is a skillful game, with some great choices made in the physics and UI engine, it is missing a little spark to make it a truly great mobile racing game. Would I recommend it? If you're a racing nut, then yes – there's a lot on offer here, but it's all under the surface. For a casual player looking for something in this genre I'd probably suggest this as a second or third choice."
