= Codename: Panzers – Phase Two =

2005 video game

- Developer: StormRegion
- Publisher: cdv Software Entertainment
- Platform: Microsoft Windows
- Release: EU: July 22, 2005; NA: July 25, 2005
- Genre: Real-time tactics
- Modes: Single-player, multiplayer

Codename: Panzers – Phase Two is a 2005 real-time tactics video game developed by the Hungarian studio StormRegion and published by cdv Software Entertainment. It is the sequel to Codename: Panzers – Phase One. The two games were followed by Codename: Panzers – Cold War.

== Gameplay ==
Like Soldiers: Heroes of World War II and, to a lesser extent, Blitzkrieg, Codename: Panzers focuses on managing groups of troops, tanks, armored vehicles, and artillery and destroying the enemy or capturing objectives. The game abstracts concepts such as supply, repair, and air support without doing away with them entirely, and belongs to the real-time tactics genre more than the traditional wargame/simulation genre.

== Story ==
Phase Two focuses on three campaigns: Axis (the same leader as in the first game with Dario DeAngelis, the Italian leader), Western Allied (the same leader as in the first game), and Yugoslavian Partisans (led by Farvan "Vuk" Pondurovik, sometimes misspelled as Fervan). The Axis campaign follows the Italian Dario de Angelis and the Afrika Korps through the North African Campaign to the First Battle of El Alamein. The Western Allied campaign begins at the Second Battle of El Alamein, and includes Operation Torch, the Battle for Tobruk, and the Battle of the Kasserine Pass, then finishes with the Allied campaign in Italy, including Anzio and the Battle of Monte Cassino. The Yugoslav partisan campaign focus on combat in the Balkans with Soviet assistance.

== Development ==
Publisher cdv Software took a hard line against software piracy with Phase Two. In July 2005, the company announced a partnership with Logistep to legally prosecute pirates for every "traced and proven pirated copy as well as every illegal download and upload". The game was an important part of CDV's financial strategy for 2005; its predecessor, Codename: Panzers – Phase One, had been a commercial success.

== Reception ==
Reception

Aggregate scores
Aggregator	Score
GameRankings	80.24%
Metacritic	80/100

Review scores
Publication	Score
Computer Games Magazine	4/5 stars
Computer Gaming World	3/5 stars
Game Informer	8/10
GameSpot	8.3/10
GameSpy	4/5 stars
GameZone	8.5/10
Hardcore Gamer	4/5
IGN	8.5/10
PC Gamer (US)	85%
X-Play	4/5 stars
The Sydney Morning Herald	4/5 stars
The Times	4/5 stars

The game received "favorable" reviews according to the review aggregation website Metacritic.

=== Sales ===
In the German market, the initial sales results for the game were positive; GameZone.de reported that it was "selling well" after "a few weeks" of availability. The game received a "Gold" award from the aDeSe, for sales in Spain above 40,000 units during its first year.
