= Cold War Conflicts =

2004 video game

- Developers: Red Ice Software; Fireglow Games
- Publishers: RU: Russobit-M; WW: GMX Media
- Platform: Microsoft Windows
- Release: RU: 2003; WW: March 26, 2004
- Genre: Real-time strategy
- Mode: Single-player

Cold War Conflicts, known in Russia as Confrontation: Asia on fire (Russian: Противостояние: Азия в огне) is a real-time strategy game developed by Russian studios Fireglow Games and Red Ice software, set in the historical period of the Cold War era from 1950 to 1973. In four campaigns the players take control of the military forces of eight nations (United States, Israel, Egypt, North Korea, United Kingdom, Syria, USSR and China). Some of the campaigns are non-linear which means that success or failure in some missions results in a different starting point and strength of military forces in the following mission. The game is designed to present an accurate account of battlefield warfare, so most missions must be accomplished using a limited number of available units and supplies; the focus is on real military strategy and tactics, instead of resource gathering and base development.

== Campaigns ==
- The Israeli campaign is set against the backdrop of the Suez Crisis of 1956. Involved factions are Israel and Egypt.
- The Egyptian campaign reflects the Arab-Israeli War of 1973. Involved factions are Israel, Egypt, Syria and USSR.
- The North Korean campaign deals with the first part of the Korean War of the 1950s. Involved factions are North Korea, USA, Great Britain, China and USSR.
- The American campaign shows the second part of the Korean War involving the same combatants as the North Korean campaign.

== Development ==
After the release of Sudden Strike 2, developer Fireglow Games parted ways with its Russian publisher Russobit-M. The rights to the series' Russian name Confrontation was however retained by Russobit-M and the publisher commissioned a new entry in the series, Confrontation: Asia on Fire, by developer Red Ice Software without Fireglow's involvement.

After the game's release in Russia, Fireglow filed a lawsuit against Russobit-M alleging that Red Ice and Russobit-M had illegally used assets and code belonging to Fireglow in the development of Asia on Fire without permission. An agreement was reached for the international release of the game crediting Fireglow as a co-developer, where it was released as Cold War Conflicts with no ties to the Confrontation or Sudden Strike series.

== Reception ==
Reception

Aggregate score
| Aggregator | Score |
|---|---|
| Metacritic | 55/100 |

Review scores
| Publication | Score |
|---|---|
| Computer and Video Games | 6.9/10 |
| GameSpy | 2/5 |

Cold War Conflicts has received "mixed" reviews according to reviews aggregator Metacritic, garnering a score of 55/100.

Computer and Video Games gave the game a score of 6.9/10, praising it for its setting and gameplay, but criticizing it for being similar to Sudden Strike 2. GameSpy's reception to the game was more negative, with a score of 2 out of 5 stars, criticizing it for its mediocre graphics and lack of tutorials to help new players.
