= Sudden Strike 2 =

2002 video game

Sudden Strike II
- Developer: Fireglow Games
- Publishers: EU/NA: CDV Software; RU: Russobit-M
- Designers: Ostap Dragomoschenko; Sergey Korshun
- Programmer: Denis Konovalov
- Composer: Igor Rzheffkin
- Series: Sudden Strike
- Platform: Windows
- Release: EU: 2002; UK: August 30, 2002; NA: September 19, 2002
- Genre: Real-time tactics
- Modes: Single-player, multiplayer

Sudden Strike 2 or Sudden Strike II, also known in Russia as Confrontation IV (Russian: Противостояние IV), is a real-time tactics computer game set in World War II, the second game in the Sudden Strike series and the sequel to the original Sudden Strike. It was developed by Russian developer Fireglow and published by CDV and was released in 2002.

== Gameplay ==
The game has since undergone minor changes in its game engine and now features a higher resolution setting and other graphical changes. The campaign still involves the Soviets and Allies, against the Germans and a new country, Japan. While striving for historical accuracy, the missions are mostly fiction. The American missions are in the Rhine regions and tend to involve 'borrowing' war equipment from the German army rather than using their own tanks and other weapons. The British missions revolves around the actual events at Wolfheze and Arnhem and the attempted capture of the bridge. The Japanese missions are centered along the lines of tropical jungle warfare and the use of tanks is somewhat limited whereas the Soviet campaign is based on the capture of the city of Kharkov and other battles along the Dniepr river waged by the Soviet Red Army.

== Engine improvements ==
The revamped engine allows for massive battleship control as well as trains. The ability to command airfields and deploy and control reusable aircraft was also introduced. Aircraft like the fighter planes, have a problem where after takeoff, they don't seem to land making some missions with aircraft a burden due to poor controls after takeoff.

== Sudden Strike Anthology ==
Sudden Strike Anthology was a re-release of the original Sudden Strike and its expansion pack Sudden Strike Forever bundled together with Sudden Strike 2.

== Sudden Strike: Resource War ==
An enhanced version of Sudden Strike 2 which was released in 2005. The game includes new campaigns for all playable sides. A map editor is included with the game for creation of custom levels and campaigns.

== Reception ==
=== Critic reviews ===
Reception

Aggregate score
Aggregator	Score
Metacritic	68/100

Review scores
Publication	Score
4Players	70%
Computer Games Magazine	4/5
Computer Gaming World	2.5/5
GameSpot	5.2/10
GameSpy	2.5/5 (60%)
GameStar	83%
IGN	8/10
Jeuxvideo.com	15/20
Joystick	6/10
PC Gamer (US)	70%

The game received "average" reviews according to the review aggregation website Metacritic.

=== Sales ===
In the German market, the game debuted at #7 on Media Control's computer game sales chart for the month of May 2002. It climbed to second place in June, before dropping to ninth, 12th and 20th places for the following months, respectively. According to publisher CDV Software, the game reached global sales of roughly 250,000 units by the end of 2002, including 70,000 units in the German market.

== See also ==
- Sudden Strike
