= Sudden Strike (video game) =

2000 video game

- German cover
- Developer: Fireglow Games
- Publishers: EU: CDV Software; RU: Russobit-M; NA: Strategy First
- Director: Victor Streltsov
- Programmers: Victor Bargachev; Vladimir Medeiko; Oleg Semenov; Victor Streltsov
- Artist: Dmitry Jempala
- Composer: Igor Rzheffkin
- Series: Sudden Strike
- Platform: Windows
- Release: EU: 2000; RU: October 26, 2000; UK: October 27, 2000; NA: January 24, 2001
- Genre: Real-time strategy
- Modes: Single-player, multiplayer

Sudden Strike, also known in Russia as Confrontation III (Russian: Противостояние III), is a real-time tactics computer game set in World War II and the first game in the Sudden Strike series. Released in 2000, the game was developed by Fireglow based in Russia and published by CDV Software of Germany. In Russia, the game was marketed as a sequel to the 1996 real-time tactics game Counter Action (known as Confrontation (Russian: Противостояние) in Russia), made by many of the same developers.

The player selects a faction (e.g. Soviets, Germans, or Allied forces) and gains control of many varied units such as infantry, tanks and artillery. The game focuses primarily on tactics, eschewing traditional real-time strategy resource gathering and base development.

Sudden Strike was a commercial success, with global sales of roughly 800,000 units by 2002.

== Gameplay ==
The main story features three campaigns (Soviets, Germans, and Allied forces). The battles are presented in an isometric perspective with line-of-sight occlusions and practical cover.

Sudden Strike utilizes accurate in-game physics with houses and buildings obstructing units' view, line-of-sight and firing range whereas clumps of trees can provide cover to reduce the damage of tank ordnance. The game allows units to garrison a building for a stronger firing position, especially valuable for anti-tank infantry. Units can also hold their fire, providing much-needed reconnaissance. Damage evaluation is also realistic; tanks or other vehicles that take too much damage are rendered immobile unless repairs are made.

== Sudden Strike Forever ==
Sudden Strike Forever was an official add-on to Sudden Strike which introduces many more historically correct units and equipment, such as the upgraded Soviet T-34 tank (1944 version). New terrains are also provided: a desert terrain for the British missions in Tobruk and Tripoli and snow terrains for Soviet missions. The expansion also polished the game engine, balanced the damage of certain units, and added a map and scenario editor.

The add-on includes 4 inter-linked scenarios for each of the campaigns for the Germans, the American, the British and the Soviets. Other units which are added into the add-on includes, but not limited to the Universal Carrier for the British; the BR-5 artillery, 160mm grenade launcher for the Soviet forces and more. The supply system has also been tweaked with artillery crews automatically resupplying themselves with ammo crates nearby instead of relying on supply trucks to do the job. The supply trucks however would still be needed to repair damages inflicted on these artillery units.

The German campaign puts the player into the winter setting of Russian hinterlands with limited troops and reinforcements available, thus relying on use of captured Soviet artillery as well as equipment. The British campaign deals with the defense of an unnamed seaport from German attacks, whereas the American campaign probably takes place in France during the autumn season as the foliage on the vegetation suggest. The Soviet campaign involves a large armored division counter-attack on Russian soil and the storming of the Wehrmacht-controlled airfields. As with the earlier Sudden Strike original campaigns, the briefings do not explain the historical setting of the campaign, thus only issuing standardized orders to the player, for example, dispel enemy attacks or to simply take over a designated airfield in the east and so on. The add-on also includes 5 new single player individual scenarios.

== Reception ==
=== Critical reviews ===
Reception

Aggregate score
Aggregator	Score
Metacritic	69/100

Review scores
Publication	Score
AllGame	3.5/5
CNET Gamecenter	4/10
Computer Games Strategy Plus	3.5/5
Computer Gaming World	3.5/5
GameRevolution	B−
GameSpot	5.6/10
GameSpy	88%
GameZone	8/10
IGN	8.1/10
Next Generation	5/5
PC Gamer (US)	62%

The game received "average" reviews according to the review aggregation website Metacritic. John Lee of NextGen gave a high praise to the game for its gameplay and the focus on tactical elements, graphics and visual effects, controls, and singleplayer and multiplayer campaigns.

=== Sales ===
In the German market, the game debuted at #1 on Media Control's sales chart for September 2000. The Verband der Unterhaltungssoftware Deutschland (VUD) presented it with a "Gold" award at the end of that month, indicating sales of at least 100,000 units across Germany, Austria and Switzerland. The committee noted that, despite the game's "exceedingly sensitive" subject matter, the game had become an "absolute hit". It proceeded to place second, sixth, 17th and 18th on Media Control's rankings over the subsequent four months, respectively. Following its 16th-place finish in February 2001, the VUD upgraded the game to "Platinum" status (200,000 sales) and reaffirmed it as major commercial success. It continued to chart in the German market that March, with a placement of 18th.

Publisher CDV Software reported that the game sold 292,000 units into stores and foreign publishers during 2000, and that sell-through was running positively. The company also noted a high volume of sales directly to customers through the CDV online store. The title became popular in France, where it was the first game published by Focus Home Interactive. It sold 60,000 units at full price and reached #1 on GfK's charts for the French market, and remained there for multiple weeks. Global sell-through of the game reached roughly 600,000 units by the end of 2001, and around 800,000 units by the end of 2002. This made it one of CDV's best-selling titles at the time, alongside Cossacks: European Wars. According to Focus Home, the game's sales in France alone topped 80,000 units by May 2004, and ultimately totaled 250,000 units.

== See also ==
- Sudden Strike
