= Codename: Panzers – Phase One =

2004 video game

- German cover
- Developer: StormRegion
- Publisher: cdv Software Entertainment
- Platform: Microsoft Windows
- Release: GER: 16 June 2004; NA: 1 October 2004
- Genre: Real-time tactics
- Modes: Single-player, multiplayer

Codename: Panzers – Phase One is a 2004 real-time tactics video game developed by the Hungarian studio StormRegion and published by cdv Software Entertainment. It is set during World War II.

Codename: Panzers was a commercial success and received generally positive reviews. It was followed by Codename: Panzers – Phase Two (2005) and Codename: Panzers – Cold War. The current publishing rights of the franchise belong to THQ Nordic after they acquired the intellectual property rights from the defunct publisher, cdv Software Entertainment.

== Gameplay ==
Like Soldiers: Heroes of World War II and, to a lesser extent, Blitzkrieg, Codename: Panzers focuses on managing groups of troops, tanks, armored vehicles, and artillery and destroying the enemy or capturing objectives. The game abstracts concepts such as supply, repair, and air support without doing away with them entirely, and belongs to the real-time tactics genre more than the traditional wargame/simulation genre.

Units gain experience throughout the single-player campaigns and can be bought/upgraded between missions and added to the player's personal 'army' that travels with them from scenario to scenario. Completing mission requirements and optional objectives gives the player 'Prestige' points, which can be accumulated to upgrade existing units or used to add new units to the player's core force. Additionally, many missions provide the player with extra units to complement their core army. Also, the player is most often responsible for keeping alive a single 'hero' unit.

Units include a variety of infantry, armor, and artillery used by each nations' armed forces in World War II. While the main focus of the game is in controlling tanks, artillery units provide long range fire while infantry units can be used to engage other infantry and garrison buildings for added defense. Damage is modeled on a health bar system, although vehicles have additional armor plating to weaken before taking damage. Players are also required to maintain their vehicles using ammo and repair trucks. In addition to regular units the player can control, the game provides players with indirect fire support. In missions, players can direct a limited number of precision dive bomber strikes, paratrooper drops, carpet bombing runs, reconnaissance planes and off-map artillery.

== Story ==
Codename: Panzers focuses on three campaigns: German (led by Hans Von Gröbel), Soviet (led by Aleksander Efremovich Vladimirov), and Western Allied (led by Jeffrey S. "The Buck" Wilson and James "The Gent" Barnes). The German campaign begins with the Blitzkrieg of Poland, France and then the invasion of the USSR, with the final campaign mission at Stalingrad. The Soviet campaign begins with the turn at Stalingrad and ends with the Battle of Berlin and the capture of the Reichstag. The Western Allied campaign begins with Operation Overlord and the Normandy landings, and includes battles such as Operation Market Garden and the Battle of the Bulge. The game features realistic representations of tanks, artillery units, air forces, and infantry from Germany, the United States, the Soviet Union, Britain, France and Poland. It also features Yugoslav partisans fought in the German campaign when the player moves through a rebellious area of Nedić's Serbia.

== Reception ==
Reception

Aggregate scores
Aggregator	Score
GameRankings	81.65%
Metacritic	81/100

Review scores
Publication	Score
1Up.com	B+
Computer Games Magazine	4.5/5
Computer Gaming World	3.5/5
Game Informer	7.75/10
GameDaily	4/5
GameSpot	8.8/10
GameSpy	4/5
GameZone	8.6/10
IGN	8.3/10
PC Gamer (US)	81%
The Sydney Morning Herald	4/5

The game received "favorable" reviews according to the review aggregation website Metacritic.

=== Sales ===
In the German market, CDV expected the game to succeed. The company planned an opening shipment of 90,000 units to retailers, and ran an advertising campaign on television with the stated goal of reaching "beyond the usual hardcore-gamer confines". The game debuted as the region's top-selling full-price computer game of June 2004, according to Media Control. It sold 66,000 units in the German market in just under two weeks, and 70,000 units after 15 days. CDV reported that the "start of sales could not have gone better". The game remained in first place on Media Control's charts for July, and claimed second place for August.

In September, the game received a "Gold" certification from the Verband der Unterhaltungssoftware Deutschland (VUD), indicating sales of at least 100,000 units across Germany, Austria and Switzerland. Ultimately, it was the German market's tenth-best-selling full-price computer game of 2004. By mid-2005, sales of the game in the region had topped 150,000 units.

CDV had begun to release the game across Europe by September 2004, following the game's early success in the German market. Initial sales in Poland and France were strong; it topped the charts in both countries. This led MCV GamesMarkt to declare the game an "international hit".

=== Controversy ===
Codename: Panzers was the center of a controversy in Poland after its release, as marketing materials were misunderstood as supporting the Gleiwitz incident false-flag version of events, which was shortly cleared up by the developers.
