= Galaxy on Fire 2 =

2010 video game

Galaxy On Fire 2
- Developer: Fishlabs
- Publisher: Deep Silver
- Platforms: iOS, Android, J2ME, MacOS, MeeGo, Microsoft Windows, Symbian
- Release: 2010
- Genre: Space trading and combat simulator

Galaxy On Fire 2 is a spaceflight simulation video game created and distributed by Fishlabs in 2009.

== Overview ==
The game revolves around spaceflight and space combat, set in a universe with multiple star systems. Players can fight enemies/friends, mine for ore, trade commodities, and complete freelance missions.

== Plot ==
The game follows Keith T. Maxwell, who is sent 35 years into the future after a hyperdrive malfunction during a skirmish in an asteroid belt. His damaged ship is salvaged by an ore dealer, Gunant Breh, who informs Keith of the time that has passed. After a brief mining mission and an encounter with pirates, Keith helps Breh eliminate the pirate threat. He then investigates a nearby space station, where he reunites with an old friend and learns the crew is intoxicated by neuro-algae.

Keith is later informed of a Terran convoy in the system, which he attempts to join. However, his ship is disabled by an EMP and he is taken prisoner. After arriving at Alioth station, Keith meets Commander Brent Snocom, but their conversation is interrupted by an attack from the mysterious Void faction. Keith joins the defense, and Snocom explains the Void threat.

Keith rescues Lieutenant Thomas Boyle from pirates and, with Boyle's help, heads to a secret research facility. There, scientist Dr. Carla Paolini tasks Keith with retrieving Void technology. Keith also meets Khador, an alien developing the "Khador Drive," which can instantly transport ships across the galaxy.

After collecting Void crystals, Khador builds the Khador Drive for Keith. Meanwhile, the Terran and Vossk empires plan to destroy the Void mothership using a freighter packed with explosives. Keith escorts the freighter, which is heavily damaged but ultimately crashes into the mothership, destroying it. Keith escapes and returns to Thynome, where he goes on a date with Carla.

== DLCs ==
Galaxy on Fire 2 included a few DLCs to add on to the experience. These DLCs include two new campaigns, and the player's own personal space station at the Shima system. The official names to these DLCs are "Valkyrie," "Supernova," and "Kaamo Club."

The Kaamo Club is Keith's personal space station, either purchasable as a DLC for real money or from Keith's slimy friend Mkktbkkt for a ridiculous sum of credits and "Buskat", one of the rarest and most expensive commodities in the game. It allows Keith to store his collected ships and equipments, and meet a cadre of shady merchants who sell very powerful and expensive upgrades of classic ships and weapons.

In Valkyrie, Keith answers a mysterious call from an unknown businesswoman named Alice to travel deep into space for a series of high paying jobs. He steals a new Vossk ship called the "K'suukk" for Alice, and continues to work for her. Landing on the station "Valkyrie", Kieth then tests out a variety of advanced and dangerous weapons for Alice in exchange for credits, noting her many suspicious operations. Keith later learns that Alice is Carla's sister, who intends to use the Valkyrie's weapon system to destroy Deep Science and patent their technology out of revenge for their falling out. Keith, flying in an experimental craft given by Khador, successfully disables the Valkyrie, causing it to teleport to Void Space, trapping Alice forever.

Supernova takes place some months after Valkyrie, where an unknown event has caused the Midorian star Ginoya to explode, triggering an interstellar humanitarian crisis. Keith aids the Midorians by performing rescue evacuations of the system, battling both the deadly gamma radiation and mysterious stealth fighters. Keith and the Terrans then enlist the help of Deep Science to stop the Supernova event. The first attempt proves a failure, and Keith instead seeks out Moonsprocket, a brilliant but socially inept scientist currently under the influence of Mkktbkkt's flabbergasters, rendering him mute. Keith cures Moonsprocket using a highly explosive substance and begins constructing a machine that would reverse the Supernova using plasma crystals. Keith scours the galaxy for these crystals, including breaking into Vossk territory after blackmailing Mekant Orrsk for stealing the K'suukk for Alice. He and Gunant then collect the plasma needed to power the machine.

However, before the constructed array can be used, it is destroyed by the stealth fighters, who are revealed to be a radical faction of Nivelian terrorists, led by the Nevelian leader Trunt Harval. After convincing Alice to let them use Valkyrie's weapon system as replacement for the machine, they successfully end the Supernova event. Keith then kills Harval in a space battle after the latter reveals he was behind the supernova and intended to start more of them. Once all is said and done, Keith joins Moonsprocket and Mkktbkkt for some flabbergasters, hoping to catch a break from all the galaxy's problems.

Supernova also includes a new hacking minigame that rewards unique and powerful equipment, and a new bounty system, where Keith can hunt down dangerous criminals and purchase their unique ships from the black market.

== Kaamo Club ==
The Kaamo Club is the player's own personal space station where the player can store an unlimited number of ships, weapons, equipment, and commodities. When acquired, the Kaamo Club is usable when Keith leaves the tutorial section of the game at Var Hastra. It will be found in the Shima system, orbiting a lone planet called Kaamo. Inside the Kaamo Club, in the Space Lounge, there are six specialists. They can sell the player specialty weapons, ships, and mods to the player's space craft at a cost proportional to the ship cost. These services include upgrading overall armor, handling, cargo hold, and an additional equipment slot. The two other specialists will sell the player unique ships and weapons/equipment, which are sold for a given time and at a fixed cost.

== HD and Full HD releases ==
Galaxy On Fire 2 was re-released for newer devices in HD, which features more detail and better graphics. A 'Full HD' version was also released, specifically for the Apple Mac and Windows computers. However, some content was cut from the Windows version, such as the Valkyrie and Supernova DLCs, and the systems Loma and Shima.

== Reviews ==
The game received a 6/10 review on GameSpot, and a 90% score on Metacritic.
