= Sudden Strike 4 =

2017 video game

- Developer: Kite Games
- Publisher: Kalypso Media
- Director: Attila Bánki-Horváth
- Designers: János Ibrányi; Imre Bartha; Tamás Pokrócz
- Programmer: Denisz Polgár
- Artist: Gábor Mogyorósi
- Writer: Gergely Mácsai
- Composer: Péter Antovszki
- Series: Sudden Strike
- Engine: Unity
- Platforms: Microsoft Windows; macOS; Linux; PlayStation 4; Xbox One
- Release: Windows, macOS, Linux; August 11, 2017; PlayStation 4; August 15, 2017; Xbox One; May 25, 2018
- Genre: Real-time tactics
- Modes: Single-player, multiplayer

Sudden Strike 4 is a real-time tactics video game set in World War II. It is the fifth game in the Sudden Strike series and the fourth standalone release. It is the first game developed by Kite Games, a collaboration of industry veteran game developers. Originally, it was scheduled to be released for PC and PlayStation 4 on June 27, 2017, but was delayed until August 11 for PC, and 15 for PlayStation 4.

== Gameplay ==
The single-player mode features 3 campaigns (German, Allied or Soviet) with over 20 missions and modding support is planned. Each of the missions in the different campaigns are based on real life World War II battles/invasions. For example, in the German campaign the player commands the Wehrmacht in the Battle of France, Operation Barbarossa, the Battle of Stalingrad, the Battle of Kursk and the Battle of the Bulge. The Invasion of Poland is used as a tutorial for the game and also acts as a prelude to the German campaign. Post-release DLCs feature additional campaigns set in other theatres such as the North African campaign, the Winter and the Continuation War, the Battle of Dunkirk and the Pacific War.

The game’s strategy closely follows that of its predecessors, focusing on the unique characteristics and skills of limited units instead of resource gathering and base building. Reinforcements play a role in the game, but they are scripted and predictable. The game also introduces skill trees and commander roles with famous World War II generals such as George Patton, Heinz Guderian, Bernard Montgomery, Omar Bradley and Georgy Zhukov.

== Reception ==
Reception

Aggregate score
Aggregator	Score
Metacritic	(PC) 70/100 (PS4) 63/100

Review score
Publication	Score
Push Square	5/10

Sudden Strike 4 received mixed reviews from critics upon release. On Metacritic, the PC version of the game holds a score of 70/100 based on 16 reviews and the PlayStation 4 version holds a score of 63/100 based on 12 reviews.
