= Secret Files: Tunguska =

2006 video game

- Developers: Fusionsphere Systems; Animation Arts
- Publisher: Deep Silver
- Designers: Jörg Beilschmidt; Klaus Schnohr
- Artists: Stephan Hoffmann; Christian Fisher
- Writer: Marco Zeugner
- Composer: Dynamedion
- Platforms: Windows, Nintendo DS, Wii, iOS, Android, Wii U, Nintendo Switch
- Release: Windows: GER: 4 September 2006; AU: 28 September 2006; EU: 29 September 2006; NA: 30 October 2006; Nintendo DS, Wii: GER: 25 April 2008; EU: 23 May 2008; NA: 22 June 2010; iOS: WW: 16 July 2014; Android: WW: 19 December 2014; Wii U: GER: 15 October 2015; EU: 28 July 2016; Nintendo Switch: WW: 30 November 2018
- Genre: Graphic adventure
- Modes: Single-player, multiplayer (Wii only)

Secret Files: Tunguska (German: Geheimakte Tunguska) is a 2006 graphic adventure video game developed by German studios Fusionsphere Systems and Animation Arts and published by Deep Silver for Windows, Nintendo DS, Wii, iOS, Android, Wii U and Nintendo Switch. Two sequels were released, Secret Files 2: Puritas Cordis in 2008 and Secret Files 3 in 2012.

== Gameplay ==
The game is viewed from a third person perspective and uses a classic point and click interface. The game features a 'snoop key' tool, which highlights all interactive objects on screen and assists in finding small, easily overlooked objects. Unlike games in the Broken Sword series, it is not possible for the player to lose or get into an unwinnable situation. There are also a few parts of the game where players must switch between the main character, Nina Kalenkov, and her boyfriend Max Gruber, to progress.

The Wii version of the game exclusively allows the player to connect a Nunchuk to a Wii Remote and use its analog stick to directly control character movement and also supports cooperative multiplayer in which a second player uses another Wii Remote to easily point out anything that could be crucial to progress.

== Plot ==
One night, Nina's father, Vladimir Kalenkov, in his office in a museum in Berlin, is suddenly attacked by a figure in black robes who seemingly possesses psychic powers. A while later Nina enters the office but finds the place ransacked and her father missing. She calls the police but they refuse to help due to bureaucratic reasons, but afterwards, detective Kanski arrives at the place. Nina is finally offered help by Vladimir's assistant, Max Gruber. She returns to her and her father's apartment to find it ransacked too and she is knocked unconscious being attacked from behind. In the apartment she finds clues about someone named Oleg Kambursky, who is living nearby and had been contacted by her father and the latter wanted to see him again. After finding his address, Nina goes to meet him, but he denies knowing her father. Nina afterwards overhears Oleg making a frantic telephone call to someone mentioning Vladimir and Tunguska and she decides to talk to Max Gruber about the events and ask him about Tunguska. As Nina and Max go to Vladimir's office, they are intercepted by Detective Kanski holding a gun, but they are saved by Oleg who knocks Kanski unconscious and they all escape. Afterwards Oleg explains everything to them.

Apparently a cataclysmic explosion of unknown causes occurred in Tunguska in 1908 and an unnatural plant growth was noted in the area afterwards. Also a giant object made of an unknown material was found there, but was vanished some time later. Vladimir Kalenkov was the leader of a secret expedition in the same region in 1958 along with Oleg Kambursky and some other scientists, to study the plant growth. They also found a fragment made from an unknown material and Vladimir, in his "Kalenkov Report", proved that the object was from extraterrestrial origin, but the results were kept hidden by higher up and they were forbidden to continue any further. Despite that, Vladimir organized another expedition in 1977 with Cuban Manuel Perez and Ken Morangie (an Irish biologist), to search for more fragments but they were intercepted. At present time, Oleg has found out from a contact of his (Sergei) that a research station was built in the Tunguska region and a train is departing from Moscow and is due to transport many scientists, who had participated in the first expedition, to that station and not all of them voluntarily, and maybe Nina's father is among them. Oleg offers to take Nina by his plane to Moscow, while Max stays behind in case Vladimir appears, and she eventually manages to get on board the train. She doesn't find her father on board, but she finds documents about the "Kalenkov Report". Also, she reads that thanks to this report, the scientists learned how to manipulate the behavior of animals, applying different levels of radiation.

Then the train is attacked with a bomb by unknown assailants and derails. Afterwards Oleg and Max arrive outside a military hospital where Nina is held captive and Max rescues her. Max also discovers a medical report about patients with severe mental and behavioral anomalies from unknown causes, and that it was quite common in the region. One of them was Manuel Perez, who returned from the expedition with Vladimir, having the same psychological anomalies and after having been treated in the hospital for 30 years, he was recently transferred to Cuba at the request of a Dr. Nicole Charlesroi. After that, Nina and Max, by Oleg's plane, follow the whereabouts of Vladimir's former companions. Max is left in Ireland to search for Ken Morangie and Nina visits the mental institution in Cuba where Manuel Perez was transferred.

Nina finds that billionaire mobile network businessman Massimo Gartuso has bought the institution for unknown reasons and appointed Dr. Nicole Charlesroi as its director and also that human experiments were conducted in the asylum under the supervision of the director. Nina finds Manuel Perez but the only information she can get out of him is a drawing of a strange symbol which she then sends to Max via text message. Max shows it to Ken and Ken tells him that a researcher by the name of Evans had made a previous expedition in the Tunguska region in 1946 and found fragments with the same properties as the fragment found later by Vladimir in his expedition. Also, that symbol was one of many that were on the surface of the fragments discovered by Evans and by Vladimir. He also tells Max that Vladimir had made a trip in the Himalayas too. Nina and Max arrange to return to her apartment and meet there. Max arrives first but Nina isn't there, and he receives a phone call from Detective Kanski saying that Max is in danger and urging him to meet in the museum. Max arrives at the museum, only to find him murdered. At that time, Oleg and Nina arrive at her apartment and Oleg accuses Max to Nina as being in league with those pursuing them. He then takes Nina in the Chinese Himalayas and leads her in a remote cave. After she finds a strange metal artifact resembling the Dropa stones, he knocks her unconscious and takes her to a research station in Antarctica where he meets with Sergei and Charlesroi.

Nina comes round and finds out that Gartuso and Charlesroi were trying for some time to develop a technology that would allow them to manipulate human behavior by sending thoughts into the human brain the same way as frequency waves and radio transmitting work. The fragments found in the Tunguska region would be a great assistance for them to that end. Since they couldn't get their hands on any of them, they used Nina to find the artifact in the Himalayas for them, so they could use it to enhance their mobile network. Max then appears by plane in the company of several black robed figures. He explains what they told him: they claim to be descendants of aliens who launched a spacecraft in 1908 from Tunguska, but it exploded during lift-off and some pieces of it scattered around. They were trying for years to keep them off the hands of humans, for not to be misused, and they kidnapped firstly Vladimir to protect him from Gartuso, and later Max, when he went to the museum to meet Kanski, as to prevent Gartuso from enhancing his mobile network with the use of the artifacts and succeed in controlling people's subconscious. Nina and Max then manage to create a chemical reaction in the facility causing an explosion, which utterly destroys it as they flee and a lengthy and humorous ending cutscene follows, presenting scenes as if all of it was a film-making project.

== Release and ports ==
Tunguska was first released on personal computers in 2006 and was ported to smartphones and gaming systems in the years that followed. The first ports were to the Wii and DS, which Deep Silver announced the following year, stating:

We chose to do it for a couple of reasons. Firstly to explore the control methods of the Wii and DS, which we find very interesting, and secondly because we feel the platforms deserve this kind of game.

Additional work was commissioned to capitalize on both systems' motion controls. Those ports were first released in Europe in 2008 ahead of the sequel's initial PC release, but would not be localized for North America until Aeropause Games released them there in the summer of 2010. The game was ported again digitally to mobile devices and the Wii U in the mid-2010s (the latter being available only in Europe), followed by a Nintendo Switch port worldwide in 2018.

== Reception ==
Reception

Aggregate score
| Aggregator | Score |
|---|---|
| Metacritic | (DS) 71/100 (iOS) 70/100 (PC) 66/100 (Wii) 65/100 |

Review scores
| Publication | Score |
|---|---|
| 4Players | 85/100 |
| Eurogamer | 6/10 |
| GameSpot | 6.2/10 |
| GameStar | 83/100 |
| PC Games (DE) | 85/100 |
| PC Action | 85% |

Secret Files: Tunguska received "mixed or average" reviews, according to review aggregator Metacritic. with praise given to the game's visuals, and criticism given to the script and dialogue.

The nonsensical nature of some of the puzzle solutions has also been a point of criticism. Brett Todd of GameSpot called out one particular solution that involves taping a cell phone to a cat to eavesdrop on someone as something "goofy". In his praiseworthy review of the DS point-and-click game Hotel Dusk: Room 215, Alex Navarro cited this same Tunguska scene as an example of what Hotel does well in avoiding.

== Sequels ==
A sequel, Secret Files 2: Puritas Cordis, was released in 2008 on most of the same platforms as the original game. Secret Files 3 was released in 2012 for the Windows and in 2020 for other platforms. A spin-off, Secret Files: Sam Peters, was released in 2013.
