= Heaven and Hell (video game) =

2003 video game

- Developer(s): MadCat Interactive
- Publisher(s): CDV Software
- Platform(s): Windows
- Release: GER: June 27, 2003; UK: August 15, 2003; NA: September 2, 2003
- Genre(s): Real-time strategy, god game
- Mode(s): Single-player, multiplayer

Heaven and Hell is a real-time strategy God game developed by German studio MadCat Interactive and published by CDV Software in 2003.
