= L.A. Blaster =

1997 video game

- Developer: Cryo Interactive
- Publisher: CDV Software
- Platform: MS-DOS
- Release: EU: 1997
- Genre: Shooter
- Mode: Single-player

L.A. Blaster is a 1997 shooter video game developed by Cryo Interactive and published by CDV Software for the MS-DOS.

== Gameplay ==
Aliens have invaded Earth and the player is the only citizen left in Los Angeles in the year 2048. The objective is to shoot and destroy the aliens in a car equipped with weapons. There are six vehicles to choose from, each with different attributes. Every vehicle has the same weapon loadout: eight rockets and a machine gun with infinite ammunition. Rocket ammunition can be replenished by spending cash before mission start. The game supports SVGA and VGA graphics modes.

== Reception ==
Reception

Review scores
Publication	Score
PC Games (DE)	21%
PC Joker	52%
PC Player	2/5
Power Play	15%

L.A. Blaster received generally negative reviews from the German games press. The game was compared to MegaRace, Cryo's previous racing game from 1993. Power Play described the controls imprecise, the gameplay monotonous and the presentation as something that inspires pity. PC Joker said the graphics and sound are unspectacular and the car is difficult to control. PC Player noted the graphics as decent but was less impressed with gameplay saying that avoiding the enemy projectiles is pure luck. PC Games commented that there is no variety to the gameplay and summarized the game as "a bore".
