= Codename: Panzers – Cold War =

2009 video game

Codename: Panzers - Cold War
- Developer: InnoGlow
- Publisher: Atari
- Platform: Microsoft Windows
- Release: NA: March 10, 2009; EU: March 13, 2009; AU: March 26, 2009
- Genre: Real-time strategy
- Modes: Single-player, multiplayer

Codename: Panzers – Cold War is a real-time strategy video game developed by Hungarian studio InnoGlow and published by Atari. A sequel to Codename: Panzers, it was previously developed by Stormregion software, to be published by 10tacle, before both companies went bankrupt in 2008.

== Story ==
The storyline starts in 1949, and follows an alternate history, with the timeline diverging into a war between the Soviets and the West. Following the defeat of the Nazis, Germany has been partitioned into Soviet and Allied zones of control, with the Soviets building up their military presence in readiness for a new war. During the Berlin airlift, a Soviet fighter collides with a US cargo plane, USSR 5 and 6 Division attack West Germany, and the next day Berlin becomes a savage battlefield between the two Superpowers. In the single player campaign, players play on the NATO side of the conflict, occasionally switching sides to help the Soviets. The storyline is said to involve characters from the two previous Codename: Panzers titles.

== Gameplay ==
Codename: Panzers Cold War is a real-time strategy similar to previous Codename: Panzers games, except that it is set in the first days of the Cold War and features a brand new graphics engine. The game has futuristic elements, with some of the technology present in the game surpassing that which was available at the time of the Berlin airlift. The game features powerful squad leaders and upgradeable units, buildings that can be destroyed or occupied to gain an advantage, a detailed physics engine and weather system.

The single player component of the game is a campaign with 18 missions, while the title also ships with over 20 multiplayer maps. Co-operative play is supported, along with team deathmatch and a "domination" mode. The game also features famous war machines like the Soviet Mi-6 which is known as one of world's biggest helicopters, the MiG jet fighter MiG-15 and its United States counterpart F-86 Sabre, a few famous tanks for that time like the T-62, IS-10, T-54/55, M48 Patton, M26 Pershing and other armored units.

The gameplay of Codename: Panzers Cold War shares several features with previous iterations of the franchise. Units require a constant stream of munitions to function, and the interface is similar to the one from previous titles in the series.

== Development and release ==
The game was originally planned to be published by German company 10tacle Publishing and developed by StormRegion as with prior entries, but progress was halted after 10tacle and StormRegion's parent company, 10tacle Studios AG, filed for insolvency in August 2008, also causing the closure of StormRegion. An offshoot development studio, InnoGlow, was later hired to finish the game, and in December 2008 Atari acquired worldwide publishing rights to the title.

== Reception ==
Reception

Aggregate scores
Aggregator	Score
GameRankings	65.38%
Metacritic	67/100

Review scores
Publication	Score
4Players	68%
Eurogamer	5/10
Game Informer	6/10
GameSpot	5.5/10
GameZone	7/10
IGN	6.9/10
Jeuxvideo.com	13/20
MeriStation	7/10
PC Gamer (UK)	73%
PC Zone	59%

The game received "average" reviews according to the review aggregation website Metacritic.
