= Rush for Berlin =

2006 video game

- Developer: StormRegion
- Publishers: EU: Deep Silver; NA: Paradox Interactive
- Platform: Windows
- Release: EU: 26 May 2006; NA: 30 May 2006
- Genre: Real-time tactics
- Modes: Single-player, multiplayer

Rush for Berlin is a 2006 real-time tactics game set in World War II.

In the contest for the German capital Berlin, the player must fight with the American, British, French, and Soviet armies. As the players approach Berlin, they must face more and more challenges, as German defense becomes more focused and stubborn. The German campaign must be unlocked by beating either the Soviet campaign or the Anglo-American Alliance (US and UK) campaign. The Free French is an unlockable, albeit difficult, faction to play with as their powerful units are small in size and take a long time to replenish. The game uses officers that have special abilities that help the player. All units have special abilities such as faster reload time for snipers or tank barriers for bazooka men and Panzerfaust soldiers.

== Reception ==
Reception

Aggregate score
Aggregator	Score
Metacritic	76/100

Review scores
Publication	Score
1Up.com	B−
AllGame	3.5/5
Eurogamer	6/10
GameSpot	7.8/10
GameTrailers	7.2/10
GameZone	8.4/10
IGN	8/10
PALGN	6/10
PC Gamer (US)	82%
X-Play	4/5

The game received "generally favorable reviews" according to the review aggregation website Metacritic.

== Expansion pack ==
Rush for Berlin: Rush for the Bomb is an expansion pack for Rush for Berlin and was released in Europe in April 2007. It features over-the-top, comic book-style main characters and an "what if" scenario: the Third Reich invades neutral Spain in 1944 to secure key intelligence data on American A-Bomb research.
