= Outward =

2019 role-playing video game

- Developer: Nine Dots (Note: Ported to Nintendo Switch by Sneakybox)
- Publisher: Deep Silver (Note: Published for Nintendo Switch under the Plaion label)
- Director: Guillaume Boucher-Vidal
- Designer: Guillaume Boucher-Vidal
- Engine: Unity
- Platforms: PlayStation 4 Windows; Xbox One; Stadia; PlayStation 5 Xbox Series X/S; Nintendo Switch
- Release: PS4, Windows, Xbox One; 26 March 2019; Stadia; 30 November 2020; PS5, XSX; 17 May 2022; Nintendo Switch; 28 March 2024
- Genre: Role-playing
- Modes: Single-player, multiplayer

Outward is an open world fantasy role-playing video game developed by Canadian studio Nine Dots and published by Deep Silver. The game can be played in multiplayer both online and locally through split-screen. The game focuses on survival as well as the concept of the player being a commoner rather than a hero, and features several survival game aspects. It released for PlayStation 4, Windows, and Xbox One in March 2019, Google Stadia in November 2020, and for PlayStation 5 and Xbox Series X/S alongside the launch of Outward: Definitive Edition in May 2022.

== Gameplay ==
On top of more traditional gameplay of action role-playing games, Outward includes several survival aspects, such as having to carefully watch one's warmth, hunger, fatigue and thirst. It's also possible for the player character to suffer from such conditions as a cold, a disease or indigestion. Losing all of one's health in battle can lead to a variety of consequences, including being imprisoned by enemies or being brought back to safety by an NPC. The game has an auto-save system, meaning the player is unable to manually save and return to earlier saves upon death or other such setbacks. While the game has a magic system, spells were specifically designed to be challenging to obtain. Similarly, skills and stat increases must all be earned by completing quests for NPCs or paying experts to receive training. Quests have multiple outcomes, and success or failure can permanently affect the game world and how the story progresses, such as a character being convinced to stay in a faction, or an important city being permanently destroyed if the player fails to kill certain characters.

== Story ==
The game starts with the player character, an inhabitant of the city of Cierzo, getting shipwrecked off the coast of their home city. They had previously inherited a debt called a Blood Price from their ancestors, a debt that must be periodically paid. A Blood Price affects all members of a given family, and the voyage was meant to pay it off. Now penniless, and despite having barely survived the deadly wreck, they are given only five days by the desperate townsfolk to pay off this debt and retain the family holdings. Once this debt has been paid, or the players home has been seized, the player is given multiple ways to react to their unfair situation and the true story begins. They can free themselves of their bloodline by joining the Holy Mission of Elatt, enter a new spotless bloodline by helping the Blue Chamber Collective, or free themselves of the entire system through the Heroic Kingdom of Levant. These three factions are trapped in a stalemate; the Blue Chamber wants to uphold the current status quo, the Kingdom of Levant wants to overthrow what they see as an unfair Blood Price system and let people live for themselves, and the Holy Mission similarly rejects the bloodline and social systems upheld by the Blue Chamber but only because it hinders the forming of a unified front against the common enemy of mankind, an otherworldly force called the Scourge. After the player joins a faction, the stalemate starts to crack and global events begin to progress. The main part of the story consists of three parallel storylines, one for each of these factions, all of which are perspectives of the bigger story. Main quests have time limits, though these are typically several months.

== Development ==
Nine Dots set out to design a game that was intentionally ambitious for a small studio as they wanted to prove that it was not necessary to use what they deemed as unhealthy habits, such as crunch, when making games.

The ability to play the game in split screen came about because CEO Guillaume Boucher-Vidal loved playing games that way with his family and bemoaned the fact that he couldn't play RPGs such as The Elder Scrolls V: Skyrim or Oblivion that way. Boucher-Vidal noted that implementing such a feature was "extremely difficult" and that the team had to make "heavy sacrifices to make it work", noting that "Making it happen in our game made us understand why it was so rare nowadays". The team also noted that the relatively low budget prevented the game from having elaborate cutscenes or lip synching, which made it difficult to construct marketing material. The game was ported to Nintendo Switch by Sneakybox and published by Plaion.

== Downloadable content ==
The first downloadable content for Outward, "The Soroboreans", was released on 16 June 2020 for PC and 7 July 2020 for PS4 and Xbox. The Soroboreans adds a new region called the Antique Plateau, a fourth major quest-line path, new dungeons, bosses, enchantments and more.

The second DLC, "The Three Brothers", came out on 15 December 2020 for PC and 18 May 2021 for consoles. It adds a new end-game region called Caldera, and end-game quest line, bosses, and more.

== Reception ==
Reception

Aggregate score
Aggregator	Score
Metacritic	PC: 67/100; PS4: 62/100; XONE: 65/100

Review scores
Publication	Score
Destructoid	6/10
IGN	5/10
PC Gamer (US)	89/100
PCGamesN	4/10
Push Square	6/10

The game received "mixed or average" reviews according to review aggregator platform Metacritic.

Outward has sold over one million copies.

== Sequel ==
A sequel, Outward 2, was announced in March 2024, set to be released in early access for Windows in 2027, and then fully release for Windows and unspecified consoles at a later date.
