= Sudden Strike =

Sudden Strike series
- Genre: Real-time tactics
- Developers: Fireglow Games; Kite Games
- Publishers: Cdv Software Entertainment; ZOOM-Platform.com; Kalypso Media

Sudden Strike is a series of real-time tactics video games set during World War II. The series is developed by Fireglow based in Russia and published by CDV software of Germany and has been re-published by ZOOM-Platform.com. The player selects a faction (e.g. Soviets, Germans, or Allied forces) and gains control of many varied units such as infantry, tanks and artillery. The games focus primarily on tactics, eschewing traditional real-time strategy resource gathering and base development.

== Games ==
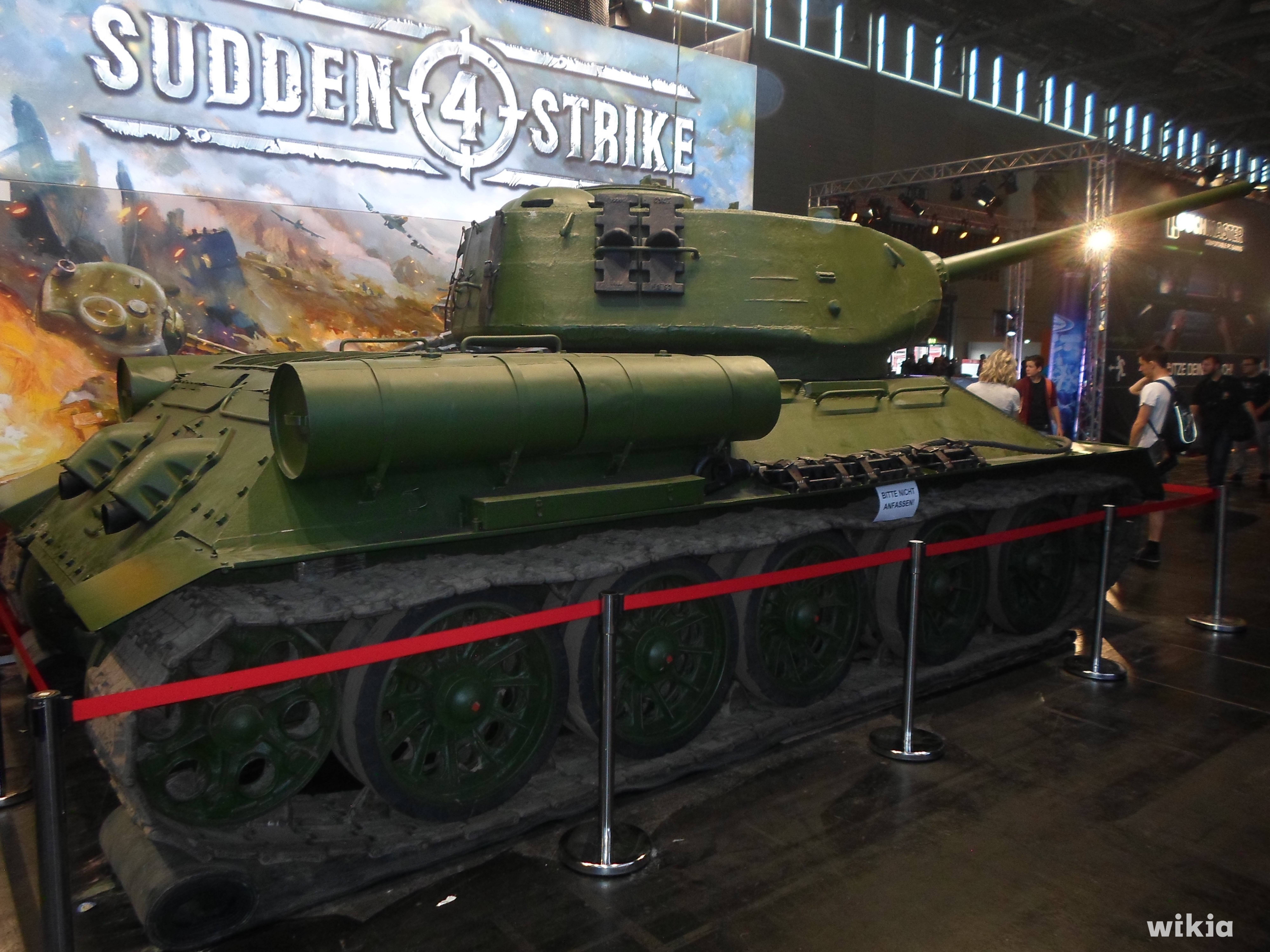
Sudden Strike 4 promotion at Gamescom 2016

=== Sudden Strike ===
The original Sudden Strike, released in 2000, included three campaigns (Soviets, Germans, and Allied forces). The battles are presented in an isometric perspective with line-of-sight occlusions and practical cover. Sudden Strike helped pioneer the real-time tactics genre, building upon concepts established by Counter Action for MS-DOS, which was published by Mindscape in 1996.

=== Sudden Strike 2 ===
Sudden Strike 2 was also developed by Russian developer Fireglow and published by CDV and was released in 2002. The game has since undergone minor changes in its game engine and now features a higher resolution setting and other graphical changes. The campaign still involves the Soviets and Allies, against the Germans and a new country, Japan.

=== Sudden Strike 3: Arms for Victory ===
Sudden Strike 3 is the third title in the series and the first to incorporate a 3D graphics engine. The game was released in 2007.

==== Sudden Strike: The Last Stand ====
Sudden Strike: The Last Stand was released in March 2009. It is an enhanced version of Sudden Strike 3 which brings back a few features from Sudden Strike 2. The user interface is reworked in order to make it easier for players to control units and realize their tactics in the game.

=== Warfare Reloaded ===
In 2010, GFI Russia made Confrontation. 3D. Reboot, a spin-off of the series set in the modern day with the Russian Federation fighting both the US and Taliban in a fictional 10-day conflict.

For the Western release, the game was renamed to Warfare Reloaded, likely since it used the same engine as "Warfare", with the "Confrontation" (or Sudden Strike in English) branding removed.

=== Sudden Strike 4 ===
Sudden Strike 4 was released in 2017. It was developed by Hungarian Kite Games and published by Kalypso Media for PlayStation 4, and Windows. While the developers hoped to remain true to the spirit of other games in the series, new skill trees and commander roles were introduced as features.

=== Sudden Strike 5 ===
Sudden Strike 5 was released in 2026. Like Sudden Strike 4, it was developed by Kite Games and published by Kalypso Media.

== See also ==
- Stranger, also developed by Fireglow
- Cold War Conflicts, also developed by Fireglow
