= Mytran Wars =

2009 video game

- Developer(s): Stormregion
- Publisher(s): Deep Silver
- Platform(s): PlayStation Portable
- Release: EU: 17 April 2009; NA: 26 October 2009
- Genre(s): Turn-based tactics
- Mode(s): Single-player, skirmish, multiplayer

Mytran Wars is a 2009 turn-based tactics video game for the PlayStation Portable.

== Plot ==
In the 23rd century, the Earth's natural resources are virtually exhausted and the ruling multinational conglomerates are searching for new raw material deposits in space in order to avert the impending catastrophe.

One planet turns out to be a real El Dorado, full of natural resources, but as the human conquerors in their armed mecha encounter the extraterrestrial inhabitants a dreadful war breaks out. In this strategy title, the player researches into new technologies and continues to re-arm his mecha in Mytran Wars. Battles are thereby fought in vast 3D landscapes against the merciless AI or other human opponents in various multiplayer modes.

== Reception ==
Reception

Aggregate score
Aggregator	Score
Metacritic	68/100

Review scores
Publication	Score
4Players	73%
Gamekult	5/10
GamesMaster	48%
GamesTM	7/10
IGN	5.8/10
Jeuxvideo.com	15/20
PlayStation Official Magazine – UK	8/10
Play	85%
PSM3	80%

Mytran Wars received "average" reviews according to the review aggregation website Metacritic.
