= CDV Software =

German video game publisher

CDV Software Entertainment AG
- Company type: Aktiengesellschaft
- Industry: Video games
- Founded: 1989
- Founder: Wolfgang Gäbler
- Defunct: 2010
- Headquarters: Bruchsal, Germany
- Number of employees: Around 100

Old logo

CDV Software Entertainment AG (formerly CDV Software GmbH, stylized as cdv) was a German publisher of video games founded 1989 in Karlsruhe. In April 2000 CDV became a Frankfurt stock market traded company. In the beginning of the 2000s, CDV was the biggest German publisher in the German video game market. As of the 2006 annual financial statements, the company also reported balance sheet over-indebtedness of EUR 1.9 million, which is, however, covered by a subordinated loan taken out in 2005 in the amount of EUR 3.8 million. The company's financial position is based on a balance sheet of EUR 1.9 million. They opened a UK office in 2008. In 2010, VG247 reported that they filed for preliminary insolvency when SouthPeak Games failed to pay a settlement. After only a few employees were still working in the company and the share price had been tumbling for some time, CDV filed for bankruptcy on 12 April 2010.

== Published titles ==
- American Conquest
  - Fight Back (add-on)
  - Divided Nation (add-on)
- Blitzkrieg
- Breed
- Codename: Panzers – Phase One
- Codename: Panzers – Phase Two
- Combat Mission: Beyond Overlord
- Combat Mission II: Barbarossa to Berlin
- Combat Mission 3: Afrika Korps
- Cossacks: European Wars
  - Cossacks: The Art of War (add-on)
  - Cossacks: Back to War (stand-alone add-on)
- Cossacks II: Napoleonic Wars
  - Cossacks II: Battle for Europe (stand-alone add-on)
- Divine Divinity
- Glory of the Roman Empire
- Grom: Terror in Tibet
- Gruntz (Germany only)
- Hammer & Sickle
- Hard Truck Apocalypse
- Heaven and Hell
- L.A. Blaster
- Lula: The Sexy Empire
- Lula 3D
- Neocron
- Night Watch
- Project Nomads
- Sacred 2: Fallen Angel (North America only)
- Shadowgrounds: Survivor
- Sudden Strike
- Sudden Strike 2
- Sudden Strike 3: Arms for Victory
- The Mystery of the Druids
- ÜberSoldier
