= Lost Horizon 2 =

2015 video game

- Developer: Animation Arts
- Publisher: Deep Silver
- Platforms: Windows, iOS, Android, Nintendo Switch
- Release: Windows: WW: 2 October 2015; iOS: WW: 8 February 2018; Android: WW: 8 May 2018; Nintendo Switch: NA: 10 June 2020; EU: 11 June 2020
- Genre: Graphic adventure
- Mode: Single-player

Lost Horizon 2 is a graphic adventure video game developed by Animation Arts and published by Deep Silver for Windows, iOS, Android and Nintendo Switch. It is the sequel to Lost Horizon.

== Reception ==
Reception

Aggregate score
Aggregator	Score
Metacritic	58/100

Lost Horizon 2 received "mixed or average" reviews, according to review aggregator Metacritic.
