= Stranger (video game) =

2007 video game

- Developer: Fireglow Games
- Publishers: Fireglow Games; Empire Interactive
- Platform: Microsoft Windows
- Release: PAL: November 30, 2007; NA: March 3, 2008
- Genre: Real-time strategy
- Modes: Single-player, multiplayer

Stranger is a real-time strategy game by Russian studio Fireglow Games.
