= StormRegion =

Hungarian video game developer

- Company type: Private
- Industry: Video games
- Founded: 1997
- Defunct: April 2008
- Headquarters: Budapest, Hungary
- Products: Rush for Berlin; Codename: Panzers

StormRegion was a Hungarian video game developer best known for the games Rush for Berlin and Codename: Panzers. They also have built their own game engine called Gepard with tools. In 2007, StormRegion was acquired by the German company 10tacle Studios AG. After a financially unstable 10tacle Studios AG ceased to pay salaries in April 2008, StormRegion lost its employees and was forced to close its Budapest office.

In 2006, StormRegion initiated a lawsuit against Mithis Entertainment, claiming that former StormRegion developers who quit the company and joined Mithis have stolen sourcecode from the StormRegion engine.

The name "Stormregion" is an approximate translation of the Hungarian term "viharsarok" ("storm corner"), a historical name for the south-east (e.g. Békés county) of Hungary.

In 2015, former employees Péter Bajusz and Attila Bánki-Horváth (developers of S.W.I.N.E.) founded a new company called Kite Games.

== Release history ==
- Trail (unreleased)
- S.W.I.N.E. (2001)
- Codename: Panzers – Phase One (2004)
- Codename: Panzers – Phase Two (2005)
- Rush for Berlin (2006)
- Rush for the Bomb (2007)
- Codename: Panzers Cold War (2009)
- Mytran Wars (PSP) (2009)
