= Professor Heinz Wolff's Gravity =

2008 video game

- Developer: Extra Mile Studios
- Publishers: Deep Silver; Namco Networks (iPhone, Android)
- Platforms: Nintendo DS, Wii, Windows, iOS, Android
- Release: WW: November 28, 2008; NA: April 6, 2009 (DS, Wii); iPhone: January 21, 2010 iPad: June 10, 2010; Android: May 7, 2011
- Genre: Puzzle

Professor Heinz Wolff's Gravity is a puzzle video game released on Wii, DS, Windows, iOS, and Android formats (the latter two mobile versions as Isaac Newton's Gravity). It is published by Deep Silver and developed by Extra Mile Studios. The game is named after Heinz Wolff, while the iOS and Android versions are named after Isaac Newton.

== Gameplay ==
Level 1 (main game) as the red button is about to be pressed.

The game features 100 puzzles that require the use of physics to solve. As its name suggests, gravity is the primary factor, along with friction. The goal of each level is to press a red button. The player is given objects like beams, marbles, see-saws, and blocks to achieve this. The nature of the game often means that there is more than one way to reach the objective.

To start a level, the player places all the mobile elements such that they remain at rest. He then presses the start button (a green arrow), at which point one (or more) large spheres or powered carts are released from a black portal. This provides energy for the other elements to trigger the red button. There is no requirement as to what object presses the red button, so long as it is pressed.

=== Sandboxes ===
There are 20 sandbox levels unlocked for every five game levels beaten. They allow the player to interact with the game elements and the physics engine. In addition, they allow the player to remove the effect of gravity and to submerge the bottom quarter of the scene in water to affect buoyant objects.

=== Level editor ===
There is also a full level editor where a player can create new levels on par with the 100 pre-built levels.

== Mini games ==
There are also four mini-games, called 'party-mode' in-game, which all utilize the same physics engine as the main game.

Tallest Tower is a challenge to build the tallest structure to survive an earthquake. The player has 35 seconds to place beams and blocks on the central platform. After the earthquake occurs, the tower is scored by the highest remaining point it reaches.

In Up and Down, the player uses a cannon to fire balls into buckets placed on the screen. There are different-sized buckets with corresponding point values. There are five buckets at the start, and each time a ball is scored into one of them, it is replaced by a different bucket at a different location. The goal is to earn the most points with the available 40 balls.

In Clear the Decks, the player uses a cannon to eliminate colored blocks in an area on the right of the screen. The player has a total supply of 35 balls colored red, green, and blue. The cannon fires colored balls that eliminate any block of the same color they contact. However, the ball disappears when it contacts a block of a differing color. Periodically, additional blocks fall into the pen. The more blocks eliminated, the higher the score.

In Tower Topple, the player uses a cannon to knock over a tower built on a pedestal. The goal is to use the fewest balls to knock the entirety of the tower off-screen. There is no limit on the number of balls used.

== Reception ==
Reception

Aggregate score
Aggregator	Score			
Aggregator	DS	iOS	PC	Wii
Metacritic	53/100	77/100	N/A	63/100

Review scores
Publication	Score			
Publication	DS	iOS	PC	Wii
Game Informer	5.5/10	N/A	N/A	6.75/10
Gamekult	5/10	N/A	6/10	4/10
GamesMaster	N/A	N/A	N/A	80%
GameSpot	4.5/10	N/A	N/A	5/10
GameZone	6.4/10	N/A	N/A	7/10
IGN	5.9/10	N/A	N/A	5.9/10
Jeuxvideo.com	12/20	N/A	14/20	N/A
Macworld	N/A	3.5/5	N/A	N/A
NGamer	50%	N/A	N/A	40%
Official Nintendo Magazine	N/A	N/A	N/A	80%
Pocket Gamer	N/A	4/5	N/A	N/A
TouchArcade	N/A	3/5	N/A	N/A
Common Sense Media	N/A	N/A	N/A	3/5

The iPhone version received "generally favorable reviews," while the DS and Wii versions received "mixed" reviews, according to the review aggregation website Metacritic. IGN noted that the game had the potential to be a sleeper hit but was criticized for being too light on content considering its price tag.
