= Narco Terror =

2013 video game

- Developer: ZootFly
- Publishers: Koch Media (PC); Deep Silver
- Platforms: Microsoft Windows, PlayStation 3 (PlayStation Network), Xbox 360 (Xbox Live Arcade)
- Release: NA: July 30, 2013 (PS3); WW: July 31, 2013
- Genres: Action, shoot 'em up
- Mode: Single-player

Narco Terror is a twin-stick shooter video game developed by ZootFly and released in 2013 for Microsoft Windows, PlayStation 3, and Xbox 360.

== Reception ==
Reception

Aggregate score
Aggregator	Score
Metacritic	(PS3) 55/100 (X360) 50/100 (PC) 48/100

Review scores
Publication	Score
GamesMaster	(X360) 42%
HobbyConsolas	75%
IGN	6.5/10
PlayStation Official Magazine – Australia	(PS3) 50%
Official Xbox Magazine (US)	(X360) 3.5/10
Push Square	(PS3) 4/10
VideoGamer.com	(X360) 6/10
The Digital Fix	(PS3) 5/10

The PlayStation 3 and Xbox 360 versions received "mixed" reviews, while the PC version received "generally unfavorable reviews", according to the review aggregation website Metacritic.
