= Secret Files: Sam Peters =

2013 video game

- Developer: Animation Arts
- Publisher: Deep Silver
- Platforms: Windows, iOS, Android, Nintendo Switch
- Release: Windows: WW: 18 October 2013; iOS: WW: 29 October 2014; Android: WW: 13 January 2015; Nintendo Switch: WW: 10 October 2019
- Genre: Graphic adventure
- Mode: Single-player

Secret Files: Sam Peters (German: Geheimakte: Sam Peters) is a graphic adventure video game developed by Animation Arts and published by Deep Silver for Windows, iOS, Android, and Nintendo Switch. As a spin-off of the Secret Files trilogy, it is a short adventure game based on the eponymous character who first appeared in Secret Files 2: Puritas Cordis.

== Premise ==
Bigfoot, the Abominable Snowman, the Loch Ness Monster - cryptozoologists are trying to track these creatures down and research them. One also appears in the legends of the Ashanti people in Ghana. These tell of human-like creatures that lurk in the trees at night and take their victims off to their caves to suck their blood: the Asanbosam. Right after journalist Sam Peters has escaped from a volcanic eruption on an Indonesian island caused by terrorists, her boss sends her to Africa. Soon enough, strange things start happening at Bosumtwi, a mysterious crater lake.

== Plot ==
Sam (Samantha) Peters is a journalist for the "Uncharted" science magazine. She works as a reporter in excavations all over the world. Her latest trip was in Indonesia (from Secret Files 2), where local archaeologists discovered an ancient temple complex in the jungle. Armed people kidnaped her, got free by Max, and now she has to bring help by informing the Indonesian authorities. The terrorists caused a volcanic eruption and captured Max as he was fleeing the eruption. Half of the island is now set ablaze, and Sam, starting from offshore Bali, Indonesia, has to escape from the island and get help from the mainland.

Using Max's inflatable boat, she goes to the mainland and, after finishing her report of the island's incident, she sends a helicopter to pick Max up from the island, but it is too late, and Max is captured by the armed men long ago. Sam then returns to Hamburg, Germany, and her editor sends her to the Humboldt University Biological Institute in Berlin to meet with Professor Hartmann, the leader of a research group and Sam's magazine is one of the sponsors of his Africa expeditions. She has an appointment with the professor and will fly off to Africa with him afterward. Arriving outside the university, she learns that the professor has already left for the expedition to Africa, and Sam doesn't know where exactly it is located.

After entering the Professor's office, she discovers that he left in a hurry and finds a fax message sent to him from his colleagues, writing that they have discovered a previously unknown lifeform in the Ashanti region surrounding lake Bosumtwi, in Ghana, which is a meteorite crater. It's the newest impact crater on the Earth's surface. There is an endemic ecosystem of flora and fauna around the lake as there are vague descriptions of animal plant varieties which are supposed to be unique and hitherto unknown. Sam sets off for Ghana and reaches the expedition's base camp on the shore of the lake, but finds it abandoned.

In a laptop, she finds that the Professor has been pursuing for years his theory concerning the influence of viruses on the changes of the genome, and in the lake, his colleagues had found a type of snail that did not seem to be native to fresh water and that the snail's genome might have been changed rapidly by eating algae which contained some viruses found in the lake and made the snail adapt to its new environment. They also considered that the viruses might not be of earthly origin, but they may stem from the meteorite which created the Bosumtwi lake. Then, the expedition was attacked at night by something unknown, and those natives among the expedition participants claimed to be an Ashanti legend of vampire-like beings roaming in the jungle and hunting people. After that, the expedition members sought refuge in a nearby Christian mission.

Sam falls asleep for the night, but she is awakened by voices in the jungle. She gets up and notices several red-eyes beings looking at her from the trees. She scares them away with the help of her camera's flash and waits awake until sunrise. She reaches the Christian mission and meets a nun (Sister Maria). The nun says that Sam can't see the expedition's members as they are very ill with something very contagious and that the beings took the Professor himself. Apparently, the nun knows something more about the local Ashanti legends, so Sam shows her the picture taken from her camera, and the nun says that the being pictured is an Asanbosam and that they live in caves in the area and hunt people at night to drug them in their caves and drink their blood. Sam pressures her to reveal the location of the caves, and the nun does so. The nun also gives Sam a diary written many years ago by Father Samuel containing his study of the legend.

In the diary, it is narrated that for many years before, there were people in the area who had the same symptoms of the unknown disease (fever, cramps, yellowing of the skin) and that the Asanbosam carries the disease (which obviously passed on to all of the expedition members in the course of their attack) and also that the Asanbosam will only attack what they believe to be intruders on their territory. Father Samuel saw an Asanbosam at night, but the latter didn't attack him, as he didn't consider Father a threat, and left, and Father Samuel found the courage to follow him to the caves. At the entrance, he saw inscriptions made by old shamans, which described how to make a healing concoction to make someone immune to the disease and to cure it in someone who already was ill by it. The concoction involves burning certain ingredients in a pot near the cave's entrance and cleansing oneself in the smoke of the mixture before entering the caves.

Sam finds the entrance to the caves, makes the healing concoction, and enters. After passing a labyrinth, she finds the Professor surrounded by several Asanbosam. She drives them off, again with the help of her camera's flash, and saves him. Two days later, back in the Christian mission, the Professor explained that for many years, the native Ashanti had been trying to fend off aggressors from their land. A shaman then realized that they wouldn't be able to succeed in this forever, so one day, he picked off some children having the best potential to be warriors, locked them (himself included) in the local caves, trained them for years and was feeding them with the algae found in the neighboring lake. As the children were growing up, they were mutating and changing physically to adapt so much to living in the caves to be exceptional warriors. Professor Hartmann says that the children's sole purpose was just to keep intruders at bay and not annihilate them and that he doesn't think that they've killed anyone actively. The disease which they carry (and they are immune to) is something that he cannot explain. He says that it may be a further defense mechanism.

On one hand, there is the fact that it is within everyone's rights to do his best to protect his property, his land, etc., in the name of survival. On the other hand, the moral ethics of the children have been mutated to achieve this goal (to have their tribe protected). Sam is then given a choice to publish her findings or not. If she publishes the findings, she becomes famous and rich and gets a sailboat. Still, many people arrive in the area (tourists, journalists, activists, authorities, military), and the Asanbosam get captured. Eventually, they release one of them in his native environment and declare the area protected. If not, the area remains undisturbed, but she gets fired and attends Max and Nina's wedding, leading into the events of Secret Files 3.

Reception

Review scores
Publication	Score
Adventure Gamers	3.5/5
Pocket Gamer	2.5/5
TouchArcade	3/5
Multiplayer.it	6/10
