= Lost Horizon (video game) =

2010 video game

- Developer: Animation Arts
- Publisher: Deep Silver
- Platforms: Windows, iOS, Android, Nintendo Switch
- Release: Windows; GER: 20 August 2010; EU: 17 September 2010; NA: 24 September 2010; iOS; 11 November 2015; Android; 10 December 2015; Nintendo Switch; NA: 4 March 2020; EU: 5 March 2020
- Genre: Graphic adventure
- Mode: Single-player

Lost Horizon is a graphic adventure video game developed by Animation Arts and published by Deep Silver for Windows, iOS, Android and Nintendo Switch.

== Reception ==
Reception

Aggregate score
Aggregator	Score
Metacritic	(iOS) 80/100 (PC) 77/100

Review scores
Publication	Score
4Players	(PC) 69%
Adventure Gamers	(PC) 3.5/5
Gamekult	(PC) 7/10
GameStar	(PC) 87%
Gamezebo	(PC) 3.5/5
GameZone	(PC) 8/10
Jeuxvideo.com	(PC) 13/20
MeriStation	(PC) 8/10
PALGN	(PC) 8.5/10
PC Gamer (UK)	67%

The PC and iOS versions received "favourable" reviews according to the review aggregation website Metacritic.

== Sequel ==
A sequel titled Lost Horizon 2 was released on 1 October 2015 and it takes place 20 years after the events of the first game.
