= Secret Files 3 =

2012 video game

- Developer: Animation Arts
- Publisher: Deep Silver
- Director: Damien Goodwin
- Platforms: Windows, iOS, Android, Nintendo Switch
- Release: Windows: WW: 13 September 2012; iOS: WW: 24 March 2020; Android: WW: 17 April 2020; Nintendo Switch: WW: 3 September 2020
- Genre: Graphic adventure
- Mode: Single-player

Secret Files 3 (German: Geheimakte 3) is a graphic adventure video game developed by Animation Arts and published by Deep Silver for Windows iOS, Android and Nintendo Switch. It is a sequel to Secret Files 2: Puritas Cordis. In the game, Nina Kalenkov rekindles her romance with Max Gruber and plans to marry him, but prior to their wedding, Max is arrested in Berlin and accused of terrorism. The mystery of Tunguska comes full circle as Nina embarks on one final continent-spanning journey to save Max and the world.

== Plot ==
In Alexandria of Egypt in 48 BC two people in black robes pay the thief Menis-Ra to destroy some papyrus scrolls kept in the city's library. He succeeds, but a single amphora containing a scroll rolls through a hole into the sewage system. At present time Nina is having a nightmare about her upcoming marriage with Max. In her dream the church is suddenly on fire, Max disappears and she sees a man in black robes. She wakes up beside Max and shortly after, men in combat suits storm the apartment and arrest Max saying that he is accused for terrorist activity, while Nina later learns that there isn't an official claim for that accusation nor his arrest. As Max is taken in custody he says something about their upcoming honeymoon in Australia and Nina, starting from this phrase, searches his apartment and picks up a trail that leads her to Max's office in the Berlin museum. She finds that in the last months Max was interested in an excavation site in Potbelly Hill in southeastern Turkey, where he was called by Emre Dardogan. Apparently in the site they discovered a gigantic temple complex built over 11.000 ago (way before the Egyptian pyramids or Stonehenge) by people who vanished 2000 years later as if never existed. She also sees a photo of a monolith, taken in the site, and on the monolith she recognizes a carved depiction of the medallion which was worn by the black-robed people in the first game. She also finds a recorded message from Emre to Max, saying that he is hunted by the police in order to steal and silence his findings, and warning Max.

After finding these, she visits the excavation site in Turkey where she also learns that the temple was buried on purpose 1000 years after it was built, due to severe crop failures in the immediate vicinity of the temple. Nina finds Emre trapped inside and reaches him. He says that Max's theory was that Potbelly Hill was contaminated with radiation thousands of years ago and in the temple Nina and Emre find the source of the radiation, which is an underground cistern with radioactive water. After Emre measures the radiation with his Geiger counter, two men in combat suits come in a car and pursue them, killing Emre, but they too are driven off the road by Nina, but also Emre's body vanishes. Searching Emre's laptop, the trail leads Nina to San Francisco.

While on the plane, she searches the laptop further and discovers that the amphora from Alexandria was found in a river in 1477 AD and that it was going to be sold by an Arab to a merchant in Florence. She then falls asleep and dreams of being in medieval Florence watching the events of the transaction. The Arab, after sending the amphora to the merchant, gets caught by guards who were paid by black-robed men. Nina frees him and follows him to the merchant, who apparently is Leonardo Da Vinci. Da Vinci hides the scroll because it contains a solution to a mathematical problem by Archimedes and he doesn't want it to fall into the wrong hands. Nina finds the coded scroll and she discovers that Da Vinci hid Archimedes' solution behind his painting "Madonna Benois", just before the painting was sold to Lorenzo de Medici. She wakes up, before she can follow de Medici, by black-robed men who entered her dream and finds out that the painting is currently in an exhibition in the Palace of Fine Arts in San Francisco and she plans to meet the restorer Michael Anderson there (who also Max was going to meet). Meanwhile, all this time since she left Berlin, she is continuously spotted from a satellite.

She arrives at the museum, only to find that it has been on fire and Anderson missing. Thankfully all the paintings were kept in storage in a fireproof room. She finds the painting and has another flashback, this time with Archimedes explaining to the king of his country that he discovered that the mathematical constant of pi contains a secret: the key to the knowledge of the world and eternity. He found a formula to calculate it until the last decimal, but that would take many years. When she regains her senses, she is contacted via computer by someone named Cassandra, who tells Nina that she is being monitored and that Anderson is missing as is Max, and so would Nina if Cassandra wouldn't help her. Cassandra then sends her location and Nina goes there, which is the building of the former prison of Alcatraz.

Nina finds Cassandra, who is Anderson's niece and knows much about tech. Cassandra says that with her computers and bots, she has managed to calculate the constant pi's decimals beyond anyone else trying. After the farthest decimals, the numbers turn into 1s and 0s and form the schematic of a machine hidden in pi. Then, men in combat suits storm the place hunting both of them. At this point, the player must choose whether or not to help Cassandra escape before Nina herself is then captured and taken by aircraft carrier to Cadiz. Searching in a container helps her learn about a machine that has something to do with CERN.

After that, she is taken to CERN, where Van Rijn (head of the facility) and Jane Cunningham (chief of research) tell Nina that they were the ones monitoring her throughout her journey and explain that CERN isn't actually used as a particle accelerator, but to uncover the secret of the machine hidden in pi by making deterrium. Jane also tells Nina her belief that this machine could help humanity by providing unlimited power, so there will be no more wars for oil or energy, and that the black-robed men are Guardians who want to prevent humanity from discovering and creating this machine. She also says that the machine will need deterrium in order to function, which also must be created. Deterrium must be created to both discover the secret of pi and construct the machine, and to make the machine work. Van Rijn and Jane lead Nina to Max who was put to suspended animation in a chamber, and they awaken him. Anderson too was put to suspended animation.

Computers in CERN have then been having functional problems and later Jane Cunningham claims that the facility was attacked by the Guardians, who stole the antimatter stored there and also says that if the antimatter comes in contact with matter, the result will be an unimaginable explosion. Nina is put to an induced coma, similar to a technical death, to see the end of the world which will come by the Guardians. Just sleep won't suffice anymore, because fire wakes her up every time. This is the only way for her to contact the Guardians without waking up. In her state of near death, she's got 3 minutes available to find the Guardians, before Jane and Max have to wake her up to prevent permanent brain damage.

Nina finds a Guardian in her dream. He mentions the Fermi paradox (the notion that, with the numerous galaxies in the universe, there has to be extraterrestrial life somewhere, but, for some reason, they haven't contacted Earth yet) and the constant of pi (greek «π»). Before he tells Nina where she can find him in real life, or what the machine (if created) is meant to be used for, the 3 minutes pass, so Jane and Max awaken her. Nina notes some coordinates that came to her mind, in a piece of paper and Max searches them on the internet. The coordinates turn out to be somewhere on the sea floor off the Greek island of Santorini and they point at the headquarters of the Guardians. Nina, Max and Jane Cunningham get on board a small submarine and reach the Guardians' HQ on the sea floor. There they find a large chunk of deterrium, behind a force field, powering the whole facility. Jane wants the deterrium, but Nina argues that they should find the antimatter first, to which Jane reacts by injecting Max with some poison and tells Nina that the antimatter is safely stored in CERN. She says that it was all a lie and the Guardians never attacked the CERN facility, nor stole the antimatter. It was all a plan of Van Rijn and Jane Cunningham to make Nina and Max lead them into the Guardians' headquarters in the hope of finding some deterrium to construct the secret machine and make it function. Jane tells Nina that she's got the antidote and that Max will die from the poison in 30 minutes.

Nina enters a chamber, where she sees the Guardian, in stasis, who was coming in her dreams. The Guardian then speaks in her mind and explains everything; they have existed for millennia and their sole purpose is to protect humanity from itself. He says that when they saw that humanity invented computers, then it was only a matter of time before the secret of pi would be uncovered. He says that the reason why extraterrestrial life forms haven't contacted Earth is because each one of them, at different ages, have become technologically advanced to the point they invented computers, solved the secret of the universal constant of pi and constructed the machine. The machine's purpose is to destroy everything. It is the limit of technological advancement of a race, which leads to this race's annihilation.

The Guardian entrusts Nina with a choice: to deactivate the force field so that Jane Cunningham administers the antidote to Max and gets the deterrium, and ultimately condemn mankind, or keep the force field on to save humanity from Jane's plan, while leaving Max to die. Regardless of the player's choice, Jane Cunningham gets the deterrium and escapes with the submarine, but she leaves her bag behind, containing the antidote, so Max is saved. Nina and Max leave with escape pods which were at the site for years by the Guardians. Back in the CERN facility Jane Cunningham starts the experiment, but Nina and Max intervene and restrain her and, with the help of Jane's assistant, they stop the process and save the world.

=== Endings ===
Following the story's completion, a lengthy and humorous ending cutscene follows, narrating what happened afterwards to each character participating in the game and, afterwards, another one presenting scenes as if all of the game was a film-making project. Depending on the player's choices on whether or not to save Cassandra and later Max, the ending will slightly vary, mostly with respect to what happens to Nina, Max and Cassandra:

- If the player chose to save both Cassandra and Max, Nina's marriage to Max proceeds as planned and the two live happily ever after, raising a family of their own. Cassandra is too busy to attend their wedding, and is back to work trying to prevent the pi virus.
- If the player chose to save Cassandra, but not Max, Nina breaks up with Max and cancels the wedding. She then toured the world solo while Max looks for a new girlfriend, possibly Sam Peters from the previous installment. Nina also finds Cassandra looking for a job.
- If the player chose to save Max, but not Cassandra, Nina and Max marry and begin a new chapter in their lives in Australia. Cassandra is able to attend their wedding, but is forced into hiding after her capture by CERN allows the pi virus to be unleashed upon numerous computer systems. Since then, she has spent her time making art out of e-waste instead of continuing her hacker passion.
- If the player chose to save neither Cassandra nor Max, Nina becomes too stressed by the events of the game to proceed with marrying Max, and takes a vacation with her father and Cassandra, who is forced to hide after her capture by CERN allows the pi virus to be accidentally unleashed upon numerous computer systems, setting back human progress by 50 years. Heartbroken, Max spends his time designing secret compartments.

== Reception ==
Reception

Aggregate score
| Aggregator | Score |
|---|---|
| Metacritic | 67/100 |

Review score
| Publication | Score |
|---|---|
| Adventure Gamers | 2.5/5 |

Secret Files 3 received "mixed or average" reviews, according to review aggregator Metacritic.
