= Secret Files 2: Puritas Cordis =

2008 video game

- Developers: Fusionsphere Systems; Animation Arts
- Publisher: Deep Silver
- Designer: Jörg Beilschmidt
- Writer: Marco Zeugner
- Composer: Dynamedion
- Platforms: Windows, Wii, Nintendo DS, iOS, Android, Nintendo Switch
- Release: Windows: GER: 29 August 2008; EU: 8 May 2009; NA: 29 October 2009; Wii: EU: 8 May 2009; Nintendo DS: EU: 8 May 2009; iOS: WW: 2 August 2017; Android: WW: 19 September 2017; Nintendo Switch: WW: 20 June 2019
- Genre: Graphic adventure
- Mode: Single-player

Secret Files 2: Puritas Cordis (German: Geheimakte 2: Puritas Cordis) is a graphic adventure video game developed by Fusionsphere Systems and Animation Arts and published by Deep Silver for Windows, Wii, Nintendo DS, iOS, Android and Nintendo Switch. It was unveiled at the 2007 Leipzig Games Convention. A sequel, Secret Files 3, was released in 2012.

== Gameplay ==
Nina on the cruise ship

Puritas Cordis utilizes the same point-and-click adventure gameplay as its predecessor, Secret Files: Tunguska, but the plot developments lead to the inclusion of a third playable character in addition to Nina and Max from the first game.

The game occasionally breaks the fourth wall, similar to its predecessor. For example, when Nina is asked to pick up a gun she says that minigames have been forbidden by the lead designer.

== Premise ==
After Nina Kalenkov resolves the Tunguska event in the events of the first game, she ends up splitting up with her lover Max Gruber. Nina embarks on a cruise to Portugal and Max travels to Indonesia, but their separation does not last long. There has been an escalation of natural disasters around the world, and Nina's father Vladimir Kalenkov has been called upon to find out what is causing them. A vicar, fleeing into his church, is killed over documents prophesying the apocalypse, but not before he manages to get the documents into the hands of Bishop Parrey, a third playable character who is tasked with keeping the documents out of the wrong hands.

== Plot ==
Continuous natural catastrophes have occurred in the whole world during the last few months and a UN General Assembly is about to take place in New York with officials and scientists who will discuss the taking of important actions. One of the scientists is Nina's father, as a geologist. Apart from that, there is a televangelist named Pat Shelton, who is the head of the European sect "Puritas Cordis" and preaches that only those with pure heart, and being members of his doomsday cult, will be saved.

Vicar Matthew found an old parchment written in code, in his old village church and sent it to Bishop Parrey before he was murdered by two men in combat suits. From what little Bishop Parrey could figure out, the parchment concerns a man named Zandona, whose mysterious prophecies speak of the end of the world. Bishop Parrey leaves the parchment somewhere for Professor William Patterson, who is an expert in medieval ciphers, to find, just before he is murdered too. One week later, Nina, following a recent breakup with Max, is about to get on board the cruise ship Calypso. Before she gets on board, a man stumbles upon her and is killed in an accident a moment afterwards. Nina then finds in her cabin William Patterson's suitcase, instead of hers, and as she searches for hers, she learns that the man who was killed in the accident, was William Patterson. After numerous strange occurrences happening on board the ship, the weather gets worse and as the ship is about to be hit by an enormous flood wave, a helicopter arrives to save a secret member of the sect who was on board the ship causing the misdeeds.

Meanwhile, Max is visiting a small Indonesian island to make a photo documentary of his old colleague Sam Peters, about an ancient temple. Suddenly Sam is attacked and kidnapped by sect members and Max is trying to save her. The ship where Nina is on, has capsized and she manages to get out on a nearby shore with David Korell, who is a vicar from Berlin. He explains to her that William Patterson slipped to her a letter when he bumped at her before he had the accident. Nina found it on board the ship and it's a letter written in 1681 by a nun, Sister Elise, at her last days. She mentions Zandona's prophecies, about a series of natural disasters that will happen before the end of the world, and she also mentions a "key" that can stop the end from coming, which is in the town of Gatineau, but she couldn't acquire it. At present time, David Korell explains that the sect was searching for this letter on the ship and that the catastrophes happened in the exact order prophesized, so they have to reach the ruins of the ancient city of Gatineau and get the key.

Max saves Sam and prompts her to bring help. Then he enters the ancient temple alone, but the armed men from the sect had planted a bomb there, which sets off causing a volcanic eruption. As he flees, he is captured. Nina and David arrive at the ancient ruins of Gatineau and Nina discovers a letter where it's written that Puritas Cordis is Zandona's congregation made into a sect and they are behind all the "natural catastrophes", causing all of them by sabotages. The first of them was the burning of the town of Gatineau to the ground in 1658, because they didn't believe him, but their plans were averted back then. Nina and David assume that Pat Shelton and the modern Puritas Cordis are trying to complete Zandona's plans. The duo pick a trail leading them to Paris, in a Cardinal's secret archives, to find more of the old fake prophecy, in order to predict and avert Puritas Cordis' next moves. After much effort all over Paris, Nina manages to find and enter the Cardinal's secret archives and with David they realize that the sect is planning to hit at the UN General Assembly. As they leave, sect members appear and apprehend them. David is shot and Nina is captured.

Max and Nina are led in front of Pat Shelton who explains the sect's plan. He explains that the world was led to catastrophe due to its current world leaders and he plans to kill them all (alongside millions of people) by creating a tsunami and crash in many places worldwide, among them in New York and the UN General Assembly. His goal is that he and other members of the sect want rule and lead the world. He also says that vicar David Korell was from the Church Intelligence Service and asks Nina and Max whether they are aware of any further efforts from the C.I.S. to prevent the sect's plan. He doesn't believe that they don't know anything more, so Max is shot and left for dead, but unbeknownst to all he is saved by a metallic object he had found earlier and had placed it in his shirt pocket. It is also revealed that Shelton was keeping everyone else in the sect in ignorance about his plans, except only his deputy (who was on board the Calypso). Max frees Nina and she manages to start a self-destruct sequence in Shelton's base of operations canceling his plans and thus saving millions of people. A lengthy and humorous ending cutscene follows, narrating what happened afterwards to each character participating in the game.

== Reception ==
Reception

Aggregate score
Aggregator	Score
Metacritic	(Wii) 70/100 (DS) 70/100 (PC) 64/100

Review scores
Publication	Score
4Players	84/100
GameStar	86/100

Secret Files 2: Puritas Cordis received "mixed or average" reviews, according to review aggregator Metacritic.

== Sequel and spin-off ==
A third and final installment of the Secret Files series, Secret Files 3, was released on Windows in 2012, then ported to modern smartphones and the Nintendo Switch in 2020.

One year after the initial PC release of Secret Files 3, a spin-off game, Secret Files: Sam Peters, was released and eventually made available on the same platforms as 3. It is a shorter game based on the eponymous character who first appeared in Secret Files 2.
