= Index of DOS games (V) =

This is an index of DOS games.

This list has been split into multiple pages. Please use the Table of Contents to browse it.

Title	Released	Developer(s)	Publisher(s)
V for Victory: D-Day Utah Beach	1991	Atomic Games	Three-Sixty Pacific
V for Victory: Gold-Juno-Sword	1993	Atomic Games	Three-Sixty Pacific
V for Victory: Market-Garden	1993	Atomic Games	Three-Sixty Pacific
V for Victory: Velikiye Luki	1992	Atomic Games	Three-Sixty Pacific
Valhalla	1989	Norsehelm Production	Optyk
Veil of Darkness	1993	Event Horizon Software	Strategic Simulations
Vengeance of Excalibur	1991	Synergistic Software	Virgin Interactive
Vette!	1989	Sphere	Spectrum HoloByte
Video Trek 88	1982	Windmill Software	Windmill Software
Vinyl Goddess from Mars	1995	Six Pound Sledge Studios	Union Logic Software Publishing
Virtua Chess	1995	Titus France SA	Titus France SA
Virtual Karts	1995	MicroProse	MicroProse
Virtual Pool	1995	Celeris Inc	Interplay Entertainment
Virtual Reality Studio 2.0	1992	Incentive Software	Domark
Virtual Snooker	1996	Celeris	Interplay Entertainment
Virtuoso	1994	Motivetime	Elite Systems
Virus	1988	Frontier Developments	Firebird Software
Visions of Aftermath: The Boomtown	1988	Chivalry Software	Mindscape
Vixen	1988	Intelligent Design	Martech
Vlak	1993	Miroslav Nemecek	Miroslav Nemecek
Volfied	1989	Empire Software	Empire Software
Voyeur	1994	Philips POV Entertainment	Interplay Entertainment
Voyeur II	1996	InterWeave Entertainment	Philips Media
