= Operation Crusader (video game) =

1994 video game

- Developer: Atomic Games
- Publisher: Avalon Hill
- Series: World at War
- Platforms: MS-DOS, Classic Mac OS
- Release: NA: 1994
- Genre: Computer wargame

Operation Crusader is a computer wargame developed by Atomic Games and published in 1994 by Avalon Hill for MS-DOS and Classic Mac OS. It was among the releases in Avalon Hill's push to revive its computer game division during the 1990s, in an attempt to diversify its business because of falling board wargame sales. The company hired Atomic Games as a key to this initiative, and Crusader acted as the spiritual successor to its earlier V for Victory wargame series, reusing and updating much of the game design and code from those titles.

Operation Crusader was the first game in the World at War series, and was followed by World at War: Stalingrad and D-Day: America Invades.

== Gameplay ==
The player takes control of a military commander during World War II. The player is tasked with building up an army in order to destroy the opposing military. The player has the choice between being an Ally, or being part of the Axis.

== Development ==
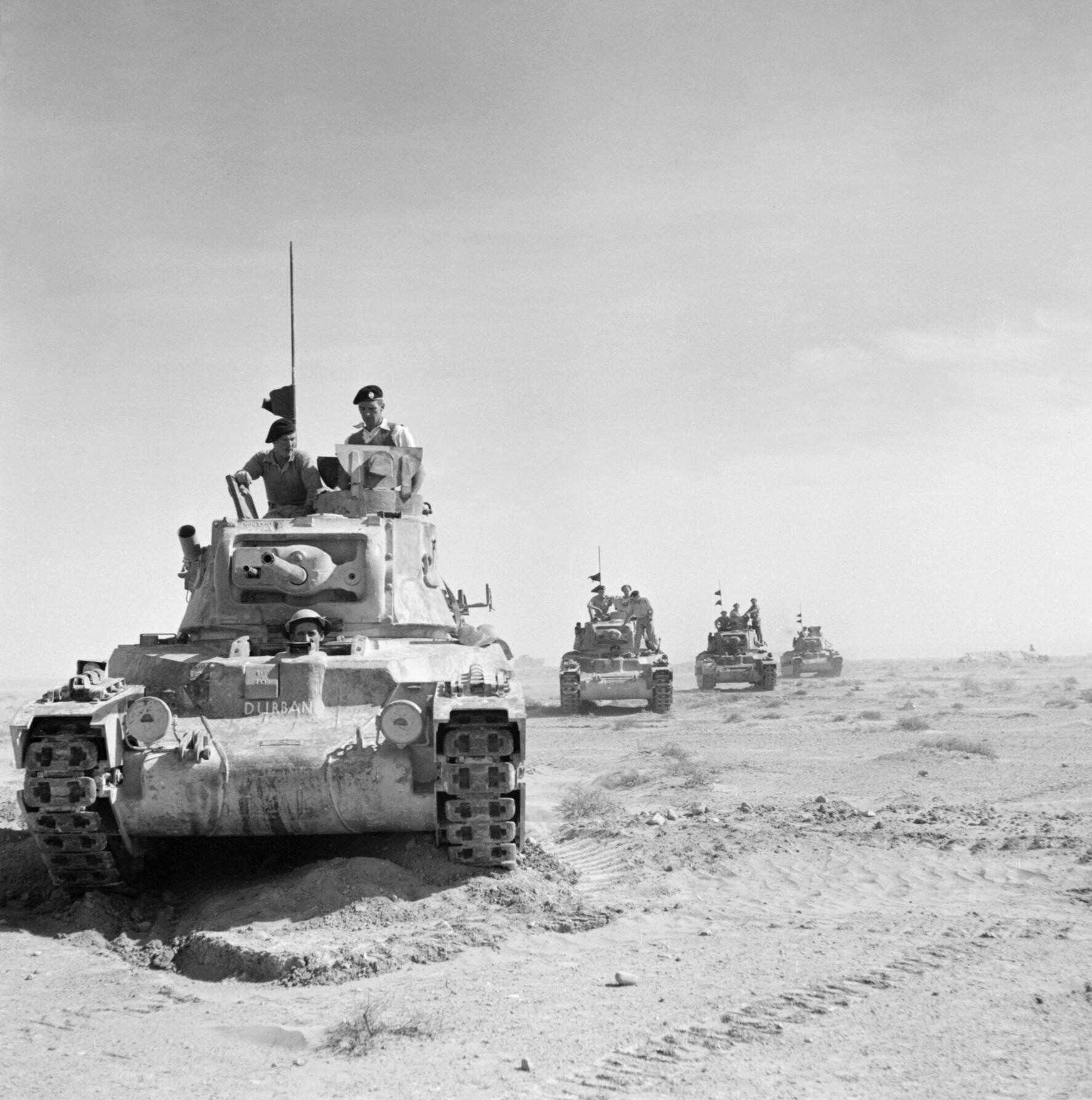
Operation Crusader was designed to simulate the historical World War II military operation of the same name (pictured in November 1941).

Starting with the hire of producer Jim Rose in December 1992, Avalon Hill began an effort to revive its computer game branch in response to flagging board wargame sales during the 1990s. Rose signed developer Atomic Games in 1993 as a key part of this initiative. The Atomic team was known for the V for Victory series with Three-Sixty Pacific, but had recently left that publisher, after a period of financial problems that culminated in a lawsuit for unpaid royalties. While Avalon contracted Atomic primarily to create a computer version of Advanced Squad Leader, Alan Emrich of Computer Gaming World reported rumors in 1993 that "Avalon Hill will [also] be publishing a second game from Atomic" centered on the North African Campaign. He speculated that this was "what would be the next V for Victory game in an Avalon Hill wrapper". By January 1994, Atomic Games had revealed the World at War series as the successor to its V for Victory line under Avalon, and its first entry was entitled Operation Crusader.

Alongside Kingmaker, Operation Crusader was one of the first two titles released as part of Avalon Hill's new initiative. The computer game division had previously been known for low-quality titles, a problem that Avalon Hill's Don Greenwood blamed on his and the company's "hubris" and favoritism toward board products. Ross Hetrick of the Baltimore Sun reported that the company's first venture ran from 1983 to 1986, and ended "when its games began to lag those of competitors." For Operation Crusader, Zabalaoui noted that Avalon Hill's president had informed him that " 'good' isn't good enough".

Atomic and Avalon Hill experienced creative friction during the development of Operation Crusader.Computer Gaming World columnist Alan Emrich wrote in 1995, "To say there was no love lost between [...] Jim Rose and Atomic's Keith Zabalaoui would be a gracious understatement." However, the magazine's Terry Coleman noted that the "tensions" between the companies' design philosophies "worked positively" on Operation Crusader.

Operation Crusader was released in 1994, between April and June.

== Reception ==
Operation Crusader sold fewer than 50,000 units globally. This was part of a trend for Avalon Hill games during the period; Terry Coleman of Computer Gaming World wrote in late 1998 that "no AH game in the past five years" had reached the mark.

In PC Gamer US, William R. Trotter called Operation Crusader "a thoroughbred and a champion", and awarded it a score of 94%. Czech magazine Score rated the game 6 out of 10.

Trotter went on to name Operation Crusader one of his favorite titles of 1994, and wrote that it "captured all the sweep, fluidity, and sudden reversals-of-fortune that characterized the desert war." The game was also a runner-up for Computer Gaming World's 1994 "Wargame of the Year" prize, which ultimately went to Panzer General. The editors remarked that Crusader "one-ups Atomic Games' V for Victory series in terms of both graphics and gameplay."

In 1996, Computer Gaming World declared Operation Crusader the 110th-best computer game ever released. The magazine's wargame columnist Terry Coleman named it his pick for the 9th-best computer wargame released by late 1996.
