= Harpoon II =

1994 video game

- Developers: Three-Sixty Pacific; IntraCorp (Mac)
- Publisher: Three-Sixty Pacific
- Designer: Larry Bond
- Series: Harpoon
- Platforms: MS-DOS, Classic Mac OS
- Release: 1994: MS-DOS; 1996: Mac
- Genre: Computer wargame
- Mode: Single-player

Harpoon II is a computer wargame published by Three-Sixty Pacific in 1994 for MS-DOS. This was the second game in the Harpoon series. A port to by Classic Mac OS by IntraCorp was released in 1996.

Harpoon II received several expansion packs including BattleSet 2: WestPac and BattleSet 3: Cold War. Harpoon II Deluxe: Multimedia Edition, an updated version of the game, was released in 1995.

== Gameplay ==
Harpoon II includes 15 scenarios and an in-game editor for user-made scenarios.

== Reception ==
Reception

Review scores
| Publication | Score |
|---|---|
| AllGame | 3.5/5 (Mac) |
| Computer Gaming World | 4/5; 3.5/5 (Deluxe) |
| PC Games (DE) | 75% |
| PC Player (DE) | 60/100 |
| Pelit (FI) | 84/100 (WestPac); 88/100 (Cold War) |

Computer Gaming World's Tim Carter said that "HARPOON II is an immensely technical treatment of a complicated subject. It therefore requires considerable effort in order to play, and for users not familiar with the system, will involve a lot of work. However, it remains a benchmark in term of its modeling of modern warfare".

A year later Tim Carter also reviewed the Deluxe version and said "HARPOON II DELUXE MULTIMEDIA is an important, albeit mislabeled, addition to the HARPOON line. While the basic game system has not changed, and little is gained by the extra animation and sound, the new scenarios and the scenario editor should give HARPOON II a considerable lifespan on the hard drives of the converted. For those who did not like the original or HARPOON II, however, this package is unlikely to change your mind."

AllGame's Lisa Karen Savignano said that "Once you get used to the controls, the game does bring such an air of realism to play that you may find yourself on the edge of your seat. At the very least, you will feel like you are actually in the navy as you play."
