= Rescue Raiders =

1984 video game

- Publisher: Sir-Tech
- Designers: Arthur Britto; Greg Hale
- Platform: Apple II
- Release: 1984
- Genres: Scrolling shooter, Real-time tactics
- Mode: Single player

Rescue Raiders is an Apple II scrolling shooter published by Sir-Tech in 1984. It was designed by Arthur Britto and Greg Hale.

== Gameplay ==
The game is played on a two-dimensional side-scrolling playfield, where two players start at main bases on opposing sides of the field. The player operates a helicopter defending a string of advancing units, which can be purchased throughout the game. The objective is to create and defend a force that can escort a van filled with explosives to the enemy base at the other end of the playing field.

Along the way, a series of smaller bunkers act as obstacles by flying balloons which, when operating for the opposing team, will destroy the player's helicopter (the cable will severely damage the helicopter). The bunkers can be taken over by delivering enough infantry units, which may reach the bunker either by walking all the way from the main base without being killed, or by being carried there in the helicopter.

The helicopter begins with three weapons: heat-seeking missiles, machine guns, and bombs. As the game progresses, additional weaponry is introduced.

== Reception ==
In 1996, Next Generation listed it as number 36 on their "Top 100 Games of All Time", citing the strategy required to succeed in the game.

== Legacy ==
In 1991, Three-Sixty Pacific released Armor Alley, a recreation of Rescue Raiders for Classic Mac OS and MS-DOS with four-player network support.

These games subsequently inspired Super Army War for the Game Boy Advance and its Nintendo DS sequel, Glory Days 2.
