= Close Combat: A Bridge Too Far =

1997 video game

- Developer: Atomic Games
- Publisher: Microsoft
- Series: Close Combat
- Platforms: Windows, Macintosh
- Release: October 13, 1997
- Genre: Real-time computer wargame
- Modes: Single-player, multiplayer

Close Combat: A Bridge Too Far, or Close Combat II, is a World War II real-time computer wargame, developed by Atomic Games, and released on October 13, 1997. The second installment of the Close Combat series, the game is played on a two-dimensional map, between two players.

Close Combat is based on Operation Market Garden; most units in the game are based on those used in 1944, with the exception of a few which are only available in custom games. The game may be played as either the Germans, or the Allies, the latter divided into the British, Americans, and Polish. The game received mainly positive reviews. On February 6, 2018, the game was re-released on GOG.com.

== Gameplay ==
Combat takes place on a two-dimensional map with three-dimensional terrain elements. Depending on the map, terrain features can include a variety of features providing concealment and cover, such as hills, hedges, foxholes, trenches, streams and buildings. Units have limited fields of vision (particularly vehicles), suffer from fatigue, have limited ammunition, can be suppressed, will break and flee if their morale drops too low, and generally behave in a manner similar to real life (although there are options to make units always visible, always obey orders, and/or fearless).

The units used in the game vary, but are nonetheless divided into two categories: infantry and support. The infantry category contains most infantry units, such as rifle infantry, scouts, snipers, MG42 machine gunners (for the German side), antitank infantry (for the Allied side), heavy assault teams, and reserves. More specialized infantry teams such as flamethrower engineers, mortar teams and machine gun teams are placed in the support category, as are vehicles (including halftracks, armored cars, tanks, tank destroyers, assault guns) and fixed guns.

=== Gameplay modes ===
The player can choose to play a single battle, or a longer operation or campaign made up of multiple battles.

==== Battle ====
The "battle" depicts a single one-day engagement, such as the taking of the Arnhem rail bridge (Battle of Arnhem). Battles are played in a single seating, and usually last several minutes. Units are assigned to each player at the start of the battle and cannot be changed. The objective of each battle is usually for the Allies to take victory locations dotted around the map, and the Germans to hold those locations (although this can vary with the map). Sometimes, the Allies may have to secure a bridge (by forcing the Germans off the map) before the Germans can destroy it. Declaring a ceasefire or retreating from the battle immediately ends it.

==== Operation ====
Operations are made up of a series of battles (up to five), and depict an operation spanning several days in a specific locale (such as the offensive at the Arnhem Bridge). The overall objective of each side is to control the maps in the operation, with each map having a certain point value:

If the player fails to win the entire map, they still receives points based on the number and value of victory locations controlled. The victory level at the end of the operation is based on the sum of victory points accumulated at the end of each day.

Unlike battles, in an operation the players can customize their force before each battle by purchasing units before each battle, using requisition points (obtained over time as a result of receiving supplies). Up to nine infantry units and six support units may be brought into a single battle. A unit that takes losses will be eventually replenished (although it may be better to simply remove that unit and requisition a new one).

Additionally, both sides can declare a ceasefire, which stops the battle for one to seven hours while both sides recuperate. A badly beaten force can also choose to flee from the battle, although this can result in engaged units being captured by the enemy, or even (if the map is the last one in the operation controlled by the retreating side) result in the operation being canceled.

==== Sector campaign ====
The sector campaign offers a larger scope of combat than the operation or battle. Sector campaigns take place in one of the three sectors: Arnhem, Nijmegen, or Eindhoven. Each sector campaign consists of a number of operations fought in parallel (thus, rather than playing an entire operation and moving on to the next one, the player will be fighting battles in multiple operations at once).

The objective in each sector campaign is similar that of the operation; that is, to take and hold maps. The victory rating for the Arnhem sector campaign is based on how well British and Polish forces are holding out at the end of the campaign (compared to the historical outcome of the real-life campaign), while that of the Nijmegen and Eindhoven sector campaigns is based on how quickly XXX Corps can advance through that sector (likewise).

If the Germans can seize the landing zones, they will be able to prevent the Allied airborne units from receiving supplies. Moreover, they can delay XXX Corps's progress by attacking a road or bridge after it has already passed that location.

==== Grand Campaign ====
The Grand Campaign is the largest in scope of all the gameplay modes, and offers the most strategy. It combines all three sector campaigns into a single campaign, depicting the events of Operation Market Garden starting from September 17, 1944. The ultimate objective is Arnhem, particularly the road bridge.

At the end of each day, both players must choose a sector to supply (other sectors will also be supplied, but not as much). German forces can receive supplies by land at any time, while Allied forces can only be resupplied by land in areas which XXX Corps has already relieved. Additionally, the Allied player can also airdrop supplies into any sector (unless the Germans control the landing zones).

Victory is determined based on how fast XXX Corps reaches Arnhem (or if they even arrive at all), and how much ground 1st Airborne has managed to hold when reinforcements arrive.

== Development ==
Following an unofficial report on March 8, 1997, Close Combat: A Bridge Too Far was announced by publisher Microsoft and developer Atomic Games on March 11. The original Close Combat was among Microsoft's "most successful titles" by that point, according to Next Generation, and the sequel was "expected to not depart from the original to drastically". Earlier in the year, there had been speculation within the game industry that Atomic would be hired by Avalon Hill to develop Computer Squad Leader, a project ultimately delegated to Big Time Software in January 1997. Like its predecessor, A Bridge Too Far was published by Microsoft on a "title to title" basis; the company held no stake in Atomic.

In mid-March, Microsoft announced its planned computer game releases for 1997, which included A Bridge Too Far.

== Critical reception ==
Reception

Review scores
Publication	Score
Computer Gaming World	4.5/5
Next Generation	3/5
PC Gamer (UK)	86%
PC Gamer (US)	88%
PC Zone	88/100
Macworld	3.5/5
Computer Games Strategy Plus	4.5/5

Like its predecessor, A Bridge Too Far achieved worldwide sales of roughly 200,000 units by February 1999. Atomic Games' head Keith Zabalaoui said that the first two Close Combat titles each outsold the company's earlier games by around ten to one. Before the release of Close Combat III, he described A Bridge Too Far as the company's "most successful game yet".

Macworld's Michael Gowan wrote that A Bridge Too Far "boils down the complexity of battle into a fairly intuitive interface". He summarized it as "a solid campaign game".

Next Generation reviewed the Macintosh version of the game, rating it three stars out of five, and stated that "Although not a perfect game, Close Combat: A Bridge Too Far fills the gap between the classic WWII strategy of titles like V for Victory and the current Command & Conquer knockoffs. If replaying history battles appeals to you, A Bridge Too Far is the game to play."

=== Awards ===
Notable awards received by this game include: coming seventh in GameSpy's "Top Ten Real-Time Strategy Games of All Time", editor's choice from PC Gamer, and runner up as the best wargame of the year, by PC Gamer. A Bridge Too Far was a runner-up for Computer Gaming World's 1997 "Wargame Game of the Year" award, which ultimately went to Sid Meier's Gettysburg! The editors wrote that A Bridge Too Far is "improved in every way over Atomic's original Close Combat." It was also a finalist for GameSpot's 1997 "Best Wargame" award, which again went to Gettysburg! The editors wrote, "A Bridge Too Far packs much more depth and challenge than your typical real-time strategy game and has quickly become the definitive standard in military simulation." Similarly, the Computer Game Developers Conference nominated A Bridge Too Far for its "Best Strategy/Wargame" Spotlight Award, but this went ultimately to Myth: The Fallen Lords. CNET Gamecenter likewise nominated it in the "Strategy/War" category, but gave the award to Age of Empires.

In 1998, PC Gamer US declared A Bridge Too Far the 43rd-best computer game ever released, and the editors called it "the Saving Private Ryan of wargaming." In 2011, Atomic magazine included the game on their list of best historical strategy games.
