= D-Day: America Invades =

1995 video game

- Developer: Atomic Games
- Publisher: Avalon Hill
- Series: World at War
- Platforms: MS-DOS, Macintosh
- Release: 1995
- Genre: Computer wargame
- Modes: Single-player, multiplayer

D-Day: America Invades is a 1995 computer wargame developed by Atomic Games and published by Avalon Hill for IBM PC compatibles and Macintosh. It is the third game in the World at War series, following Operation Crusader and World at War: Stalingrad.

== Gameplay ==
Set in World War II, D-Day: America Invades is a computer wargame that simulates D-Day and the following fight for territorial advantages.

== Development ==
The game was originally announced by developer Atomic Games under the title America Invades! as a revamped version of V for Victory: D-Day Utah Beach. As a consequence of Atomic Games' split with publisher Avalon Hill in September 1995, D-Day: America Invades was the two companies' last game together. According to Alan Emrich of Computer Gaming World, Atomic's Keith Zabalaoui called this "purely a business decision" and clarified that there was no ill will between the companies.

The PC release of the game shipped to retail without an installation routine. This required users to keep the CD-ROM in the drive to play it, though a bug involving the CONFIG.SYS file could still prevent the program from detecting the disc. Avalon Hill later addressed the problems with a version 1.01 patch.

== Reception ==
Reception

Review scores
Publication	Score
Computer Gaming World	2/5
Next Generation	4/5
PC Gamer (US)	95%
Computer Game Review	70/90/77
Gambler	80%
PC Top Player	64/100
Power Play	74%

D-Day: America Invades sold fewer than 50,000 units globally. This was part of a trend for Avalon Hill games during the period; Terry Coleman of Computer Gaming World wrote in late 1998 that "no AH game in the past five years" had reached the mark.

Next Generation reviewed the PC version of the game, rating it four stars out of five, and stated that "Atomic Games manages to take much of the tedium out of this tile-based wargame, enabling you to concentrate on strategy as you try to duplicate history, or if you're playing as the Nazis, change it." William R. Trotter wrote for PC Gamer US, "Hats off, ladies and gents: a classic is born. Wargames just don't get any better than this."
