= Naval War: Arctic Circle =

2012 video game

- North American cover art
- Developer: Turbo Tape Games
- Publisher: Paradox Interactive
- Director: Jan Haugland
- Producer: Fredrik Sundt Breien
- Programmers: Andreas Johansen; Tor-Inge Jenssen; Espen Sæverud
- Artist: Øyvind Lien
- Composer: Harald Nævdal
- Engine: Unity
- Platform: Microsoft Windows
- Release: WW: April 10, 2012
- Genre: Real-time naval strategy
- Modes: Single-player, multiplayer

Naval War: Arctic Circle is a real time naval strategy game developed by Norwegian development company Turbo Tape Games and published by Swedish video game publisher Paradox Interactive. It was released on April 10, 2012. Naval War: Arctic Circle was announced at the 2011 Paradox Interactive Convention held in New York. The game is supported by the Norwegian Film Institute, Innovation Norway and the Norwegian Research Council, and is developed in close consultation with the Royal Norwegian Navy.

As of January 2013, support for the game has been discontinued by Paradox and Turbo Tape Games, and in October the backend source code was released to the game community to allow self-support.

== Plot ==
Game interface mini-map. The game comprises 35 million square kilometres of playable map, north of 66° 33' 44".

Naval War: Arctic Circle takes place in 2030, throughout the North Atlantic, Arctic Ocean and the Baltic Sea. The game revolves around an imagined conflict in the Arctic Circle, where melting ice caps have opened up the region to exploitation for its raw materials. There are two differing single-player campaigns, narrated and played from Russian and NATO perspectives, and a 4-part tutorial. Additionally, one-on-one multiplayer gaming is possible through Steam services.

== Gameplay ==
The game environment consists of a 35 mil km^{2} map, and features dynamic weather and a day/night cycle, which can affect certain game mechanics. The game is played in real-time, and no 'pause' functionality is available. Time compression is possible up to 120x.

The game interface contains two viewports, one large and one small, which host a 2D strategic view of the playable map, and a 3D view to observe controllable units. The player can switch between the two views in the main display, and the other is shown in the smaller viewport.

Serving or near-future serving real life sensors, armaments and ordnance are also included. Units and equipment in the game have properties and statistics reflect their real life counterparts as far as research by the development team allows.

There are also civilian tankers, merchant vessels, fishing boats and passenger aircraft present in the game.

== Development ==
Turbo Tape Games have released a short series of textual and video 'developer diaries'.

The development philosophy of the game, according to Turbo Tape Games, is that where there is potentially "a conflict between realism and gameplay, gameplay will win every time", which means that aspects of the game do not always reflect real life, albeit uncommonly.

=== End-of-support and source code release ===
As of January 2013, support for the game has been abandoned by Paradox and Turbo Tape Games, and patches or DLC for the title were no longer produced under the Paradox Interactive brand. Later in October, the backend part of the game's source code was released to the game community under restrictive license terms.

== Reception ==
Before release, Paradox Interactive gave out beta copies of NWAC to journalists for review purposes. The game has frequently been likened to previous naval strategy games such as Harpoon, Red Storm Rising, Dangerous Waters and Fleet Command. The graphics have been commented on as generally lower quality than expected.

== See also ==
- Harpoon series
- Command: Modern Air Naval Operations
