= V for Victory: Gold-Juno-Sword =

1993 video game

- Developer: Atomic Games
- Publisher: Three-Sixty Pacific
- Platforms: DOS, Macintosh
- Release: 1993
- Genre: Computer wargame

V for Victory: Gold-Juno-Sword is 1993 computer wargame developed by Atomic Games and published by Three-Sixty Pacific. It is part of the V for Victory series.

== Gameplay ==
The game revisits the D-Day beaches, this time covering the operations in the British and Canadian sectors and their battle to take Caen.

== Reception ==
Reception

Review score
Publication	Score
Electronic Entertainment	8 out of 10

While praising V for Victory: Gold-Juno-Sword's documentation and SVGA graphics, Computer Gaming World stated that the fourth game "succeeds only a technological level, bereft of soul" and compared the series to "a line of books without an editor". The magazine concluded that "Three-Sixty's reputation in the hobby has suffered a major blow".

In 1994, the editors of PC Gamer US wrote, "The V for Victory series is quite simply the most playable war games available, with an easy-to-master interface and admirable depth of game play." They continued, "We single out Utah Beach because it launched the series — but by all means, check out Velikiye Luki, Gold*Juno*Sword, and Market Garden, too."

Gold-Juno-Sword was a runner-up for Computer Gaming World's Wargame of the Year award in June 1994, losing to Clash of Steel. The editors wrote, "Although basically a sequel, the improvements to the system bring it to the realms of wargame finalist".
