= Breach (2011 video game) =

2011 video game

- Developer: Atomic Games
- Platforms: Xbox 360; Microsoft Windows
- Release: January 26, 2011
- Genres: First-person shooter, tactical shooter
- Mode: Multiplayer

Breach is a team-based first-person shooter multiplayer video game, developed by Atomic Games and was released for Windows PCs and the Xbox 360. Breach was distributed online for the Xbox 360 by Xbox Live Arcade, and on Windows by Steam. It features dynamic destructible environments and a cover system.

When released, the game featured five maps. Atomic Games said that another free map would be released once the Breach community reached certain goals. There are four game modes: Infiltration, Convoy, Retrieval and Team Deathmatch. The game features five classes: Sniper, Gunner, Support and Rifleman are available to all players, with a Recon class being unlockable after players have "mastered" two of the four original classes. Breach has an XP system that allows players to purchase gadgets, such as bionic ears and remote motion sensors. Perks are also available to allow class customization. The game supports multiplayer matches of up to 16 people.

In Breach, players take the role of the CIA's Special Activities Division, an organisation that carries out black ops for the US government.

As of August 2011, the PC version has been removed from the Steam Store, due to lack of servers to play on and Atomic Games having seemingly gone dark.

== Gameplay ==
There are four game modes, Infiltration, Retrieval, Team Deathmatch and Convoy. Infiltration is an objective capture mode similar to those found in many other first person shooter games, where certain points are captured and the team with the most points wins. Retrieval involves the teams attempting to capture an object. Team Deathmatch is a simple format where there is a time minute and the team with the most kills at the end wins. Finally convoy involves one team escorting a convoy to a checkpoint and the other attempting to prevent it getting there. The convoy itself is indestructible, but it cannot move without an escort.

There are five classes: Rifleman, Gunner, Sniper, Support and Recon. The Rifleman represents "standard" soldiers, using automatic rifles and similar weapons and specialising in mid-range combat. The Gunner class uses machineguns such as the M60, and specialises in suppression using high damage, high rate-of-fire, but low accuracy weapons. The Sniper class uses scoped rifles and specialises in long-range combat using slow, carefully aimed shots. The Support class specialises in close-quarters combat, primarily using shotguns. The Recon class is only available after the player has gained enough experience with other classes to have "mastered" them, and is between the Rifleman and Sniper classes, specialising in mid- and long-range combat.

== Reception ==
Reception

Aggregate score
Aggregator	Score	
Aggregator	PC	Xbox 360
Metacritic	61/100	57/100

Review scores
Publication	Score	
Publication	PC	Xbox 360
Destructoid	N/A	4/10
Edge	N/A	5/10
Eurogamer	N/A	5/10
GamePro	N/A	2/5
GameRevolution	B+	B+
GameSpot	6.5/10	6/10
GameZone	N/A	5.5/10
IGN	6/10	6/10
Joystiq	N/A	3.5/5
Official Xbox Magazine (US)	N/A	8/10
PC Gamer (UK)	81%	N/A
411Mania	N/A	5.5/10
The Escapist	N/A	2/5

The game received "mixed" reviews on both platforms according to the review aggregation website Metacritic. In its first week, Breach moved over 15,000 units.
