= Blue Max: Aces of the Great War =

1990 video game

- Developer(s): Artech Digital Entertainment
- Publisher(s): Three-Sixty Pacific
- Release: 1990

Blue Max: Aces of the Great War is a 1990 video game published by Three-Sixty Pacific.

== Gameplay ==
Blue Max: Aces of the Great War is a game in which players engage in aerial combat from World War I.

== Reception ==
M. Evan Brooks reviewed the game for Computer Gaming World, and stated that "The historical gamer may find the historical verisimilitude slighted too much to yield a simulator capable of being both a learning tool and an entertaining experience. However, as noted above, the game was designed for the general market; gamers who are more into "game" than "simulation" should find Blue Max enjoyable."
