= Harpoon (series) =

- The logo used for Larry Bond's Harpoon Commander's Edition.
- Genres: Real-time strategy, Wargame
- Developer: AGSI: Previous developers: Three-Sixty Pacific, Applied Computing Services, Alliance Interactive
- Publisher: Matrix Games: Previous publishers: Three-Sixty Pacific, SoftKey Multimedia, Renegade Software, Alliance Interactive, IntraCorp, Eidos Interactive, Interactive Magic
- Platforms: MS-DOS, Amiga, Macintosh, Windows
- First release: Harpoon; 1989
- Latest release: Larry Bond's Harpoon Ultimate Edition 2015.027; December 15, 2015

Harpoon is a series of realistic air and naval computer wargames based upon Larry Bond's miniatures game of the same name. Players can choose between either the Blue or Red side in simulated naval combat situations, which includes local conflicts as well as simulated Cold War confrontations between the United States and the Soviet Union. Missions range from small missile boat engagements to large deep sea battles, with dozens of vessels and hundreds of aircraft. The game includes large databases containing many types of real world ships, submarines, aircraft, and land defenses (i.e. air bases and ports).

== Overview ==
The simulations have a dedicated fan base with several websites offering a varying styles of scenarios and discussion forums, especially as the latest edition includes a feature to allow players to create their own scenarios. Often described as a "niche within a niche market," development of the simulation has progressed steadily through the years despite the overwhelming graphical details of first-person shooter and real-time strategy games. Advanced Gaming Systems, Inc. (AGSI), developers of Harpoon 3 Advanced Naval Warfare and Harpoon Commander's Edition (with HarpGamer), currently distributes the simulation as a Harpoon Ultimate Edition through Matrix games with technical support handled on a co-operative basis by AGSI, HarpGamer, and Matrix games employees.

Harpoon was originally published by Three-Sixty Pacific and has had several development paths and publishers. Despite the widespread success of the game, Three-Sixty Pacific experienced financial difficulties and went under in 1994. Currently all computer rights rest with AGSI, who continues to improve the series with new developments and releases. In 2006, AGSI released Harpoon Advanced Naval Warfare (ANW) which allowed players to compete with human opponents for the first time in the game's history.

Harpoon's interface emphasizes technical accuracy over graphical polish, with simple 2D symbols to simulate a warship's radar display. There has been considerable debate in the game's user community about the decision of the developers to utilize 3D graphics in later versions of the program. Since March 2009, two releases are available to AGSI civilian customers. Harpoon Commanders Edition is an updating version based on the game engine of the original series. Harpoon 3 Advanced Naval Warfare is the current civilian edition of the product. Military customers are offered Harpoon 3 Pro, which is tailored for customer specifications. There was a Macintosh version that lies between the Harpoon II and Harpoon 3 Advanced Naval Warfare called "Harpoon III v3.6.3" aka "H3"

Commercial development of both versions has ceased. The most recent release of Harpoon 3 Advanced Naval Warfare aka "ANW" is V3.11.1. (January 2013). While the most recent commercial release of Harpoon Commander's Edition aka "HCE" is v2009.097 (October 2010), Matrix Games makes available version v2015.027 (January 2016) as a direct download from its Harpoon page. In Jan 2023 Matrix Games released the 2022.027 Patch for Harpoon Ultimate Commander's Edition. The patch brings any version of Harpoon Ultimate Commander's Edition from the very earliest 2009.050 to the 2022.026 beta up to the current official patch version 2022.027.

Harpoon Commander's Edition has been under development by volunteers with new beta versions available via the HarpGamer HC Beta Current Files. All beta versions install on top of v2015.027.

The H3 MilSim (aka Harpoon 3 Professional) product is still available.

== Gameplay ==
The games play in real time, with time acceleration capability in case the action slows down. The player can control single or multiple platforms (thousands if the computing power is available). The game is extremely comprehensive, although certain elements of naval warfare are not modeled, such as radar ducting, sonar bottom and surface bounce, and COMINT/ELINT.

== Reception ==
Computer Gaming World said that Harpoon II's long delay helped the game, approving of the Windows-like interface for the DOS game. The editors of PC Gamer US nominated Harpoon II for their 1994 "Best Wargame" award, although it lost to Panzer General.

== Titles ==
Game	Details
Harpoon Original release date(s): NA: 1989	Release years by system: 1989—DOS, Macintosh; 1990—Amiga
Harpoon Original release date(s): NA: 1989	Notes: Developed by Three-Sixty Pacific and Applied Computing Services; Published by Three-Sixty Pacific for the DOS and Macintosh and by PSS for the Amiga; It is the first game in the series
Harpoon Challenger Pak Original release date(s): NA: 1991	Release years by system: 1991—DOS
Harpoon Challenger Pak Original release date(s): NA: 1991	Notes: Developed and published by Three-Sixty Pacific; It is a compilation of the original Harpoon which includes additional material such as a scenario editor and a strategy guide
Harpoon Classic Original release date(s): EU: 1994; NA: June 1, 1995	Release years by system: 1994—Macintosh; 1995—DOS/Windows
Harpoon Classic Original release date(s): EU: 1994; NA: June 1, 1995	Notes: Developed by Three-Sixty Pacific, Applied Computing Services and Alliance Interactive; Published by SoftKey Multimedia for the Macintosh and by Renegade Software and Alliance Interactive in the United States and the United Kingdom respectively; It is continued on with Larry Bond's Harpoon Commander's Edition
Harpoon II Original release date(s): NA: 1994	Release years by system: 1994—DOS
Harpoon II Original release date(s): NA: 1994	Notes: Developed by Three-Sixty Pacific.; Published on the DOS platform by Three-Sixty Pacific and by IntraCorp for the Macintosh
Harpoon II Deluxe: Multimedia Edition Original release date(s): NA: 1995	Release years by system: 1995—DOS
Harpoon II Deluxe: Multimedia Edition Original release date(s): NA: 1995	Notes: Updated version of the game with multimedia features
Harpoon II: Admiral's Edition Original release date(s): NA: 1996; EU: 1996	Release years by system: 1996—DOS
Harpoon II: Admiral's Edition Original release date(s): NA: 1996; EU: 1996	Notes: Developed by Three-Sixty Pacific and published by Eidos Interactive; It is a compilation of Harpoon II Deluxe and expansions; Also includes database editor and a new expansion: Regional Conflicts 2: The Middle East
Harpoon Classic 97 Original release date(s): NA: April 1997	Release years by system: 1997—Windows
Harpoon Classic 97 Original release date(s): NA: April 1997	Notes: Developed by Alliance Interactive and published by Interactive Magic; It is a revised edition of Harpoon Classic
Harpoon III Original release date(s): June 1, 2001	Release years by system: 2001—MacOS 2002—Windows
Harpoon III Original release date(s): June 1, 2001	Notes: Developed by SpearSoft. Published by Advanced Gaming Systems; Later renamed to Harpoon 3 Pro; It is continued on with Larry Bond's Harpoon 3: Advanced Naval Warfare
Larry Bond's Harpoon 3: Advanced Naval Warfare Original release date(s): NA: June 15, 2006	Release years by system: 2006—Windows
Larry Bond's Harpoon 3: Advanced Naval Warfare Original release date(s): NA: June 15, 2006	Notes: Developed by Advanced Gaming Systems and published by Matrix Games; It is rated 3.5 stars out of 5 by allgame
Larry Bond's Harpoon Commander's Edition Original release date(s): NA: November 21, 2007	Release years by system: 2007—Windows
Larry Bond's Harpoon Commander's Edition Original release date(s): NA: November 21, 2007	Notes: Developed by Advanced Gaming Systems and HarpGamer and published by Matrix Games
Larry Bond's Harpoon - Ultimate Edition Original release date(s): NA: November 3, 2010	Release years by system: 2010—Windows

== Unreleased ==
A fourth entry in the series Harpoon 4 was originally scheduled to be released in July 2001. In 2001, the game had been in development for three years. The project was cancelled in 2003.

== See also ==
- Command: Modern Air Naval Operations
