= World at War: Stalingrad =

1995 video game

- Developer: Atomic Games
- Publisher: Avalon Hill
- Series: World at War
- Platforms: MS-DOS, Classic Mac OS
- Release: NA: 1995; PAL: 1995
- Genre: Computer wargame

World at War: Stalingrad is computer wargame developed by Atomic Games and published in 1995 by Avalon Hill for MS-DOS and Classic Mac OS. It is the second game in the World at War series, following Operation Crusader. Stalingrad was followed by D-Day: America Invades (1995).

== Gameplay ==
World at War: Stalingrad simulates the battle of Stalingrad including several different scenarios up to the entire campaign.

== Development ==
The game was released on Mac computers in November 1994.

== Reception ==
Reception

Review score
Publication	Score
PC Gamer (US)	95%

World at War: Stalingrad sold fewer than 50,000 units globally. This was part of a trend for Avalon Hill games during the period; Terry Coleman of Computer Gaming World wrote in late 1998 that "no AH game in the past five years" had reached the mark.

In PC Gamer US, T. Liam McDonald called Stalingrad "as good as wargaming gets." The magazine's editors later nominated Stalingrad for their 1995 "Best Wargame" award, but ultimately gave the prize to Steel Panthers.

Czech magazine Score rated the game 8 out of 10.
