= Harpoon (video game) =

1989 computer wargame

- Developers: Three-Sixty Pacific; Applied Computing Services
- Publishers: Three-Sixty Pacific, PSS
- Designer: Larry Bond
- Series: Harpoon series
- Platforms: Amiga, MS-DOS, Macintosh
- Release: 1989
- Genre: Real-time wargame
- Mode: Single-player

Harpoon is a computer wargame published by Three-Sixty Pacific in 1989 for MS-DOS. This was the first game in the Harpoon series. It was ported to the Amiga and Macintosh.

== Plot ==
Harpoon is a game in which the player is the commander of either NATO or Soviet forces, making judgment calls and sending orders to ships and aircraft, armed with weapon systems selected from more than 100 available options. The game mainly focuses on combat in the GIUK Gap.

== Gameplay ==
Harpoon is a naval simulator that uses data regarding real military equipment and weaponry, based on a miniatures wargame. The game does not use preset battle algorithms to control the outcome of combat, and does not control play balance between sides. The game comes with a user's guide with an appendix of information on the politics between superpowers and modern maritime warfare strategies, a Harpoon Tactical Guide by Larry Bond, and a booklet by author Tom Clancy about Russian destroyers. Clancy used the simulation to test the naval battles for Red Storm Rising, which he co-authored with Bond.

== Development history ==
In the late 1970s, a manual wargame called SEATAG was introduced by the United States Navy for exploring tactical options. It was available in both classified and unclassified versions. SEATAG was developed into a true tactical training game called NAVTAG that ran on three networked microcomputers for the Red Side, Blue Side, and Game Control.

Former naval officer and future author Larry Bond's exposure to this system in 1980 while on active duty led to the eventual development of Harpoon.

The original game was expanded with additional releases including Harpoon BattleSet 2: North Atlantic Convoys (1989), Harpoon Battleset 3: The MED Conflict (1991), Harpoon BattleSet 4: Indian Ocean / Persian Gulf (1991), and Harpoon Designers' Series: BattleSet Enhancer (1992).

A remake was released in 1994 titled Harpoon Classic. Another remake based on Harpoon Classic was released in 1997 titled Harpoon Classic '97.

== Reception ==
Reception

Review scores
Publication	Score
Dragon	5/5 (MS-DOS); 5/5 (Macintosh); 5/5(Amiga)
Computer Gaming World	5/5 (MS-DOS)
Games International	8/10 (MS-DOS)
Info	3.5/5 (Amiga)

Sales of Harpoon surpassed 80,000 copies by 1993.

In the February 1990 edition of Computer Gaming World, M. Evan Brooks, a United States military officer, gave the game five stars out of five. He stated that "there is no question that Harpoon is the most detailed simulation to appear in the civilian marketplace ... a must-have for the serious naval gamer", and that he had learned more from six hours with the game than one year at the Naval War College.

In the April 1990 edition of Dragon (Issue 156), Patricia, Kirk and Hartley Lesser called this "is a true simulation with data reflecting real-world equipment and weaponry." They thought the game was "a graphical masterpiece". They concluded by giving the PC DOS/MS-DOS version of the game a perfect score of 5 out of 5, saying, "a simulation that is far more than a game – it's war!". A year later, they gave the Macintosh version a perfect score as well. Six months after that, the Lessers gave the Amiga version another perfect score.

In the May 1990 edition of Games International, Mike Siggins noted the complexity of the game and said it "is not a game for wimps." He liked the graphics, saying, "Harpoon looks superb in high resolution colour." He also thought the user interface was "well-handled". He concluded by giving both the game and the graphics an above-average rating of 8 out of 10, saying, "If tactical modern naval is your field, this is the program you've been waiting for."

In the December 1990–January 1991 edition of Info, Judith Kilbury-Cobb wrote that a preview copy of the Amiga version of Harpoon "looks killer", saying it had "more technical detail than any game has a right to." In the next issue, her comments about the finished product were more nuanced. While she acknowledged that "the wealth of tactical and strategic data on weapons, ships, subs, etc., is overwhelming", she found performance on a basic Amiga was "unbearably sluggish". She concluded by giving the game an average rating of 3.5 out of 5, saying, "Long on realism, somewhat short on playability."

The One reviewed Harpoon in 1991, calling it a "combat simulation for purists", due to the lack of "flashy action scenes" or joystick controls. The One furthermore states that the game requires "careful" and "arduous" strategic planning, and express that "It's hard to fault the accuracy and comprehensiveness of the military hardware database which supports Harpoon, and it would be unfair to criticise the lack of more usual arcade-style sequences. The game makes no claim to be anything other than a realistic and heavily strategic representation of cold war conflict – as such it succeeds." The One concludes by expressing that "Even so, it's too dryly erudite to appeal to as wide an audience as most simulations."

In 1990, Computer Gaming World named it "Wargame of the Year". The editors of Game Player's PC Strategy Guide likewise presented the game with their 1990 "Best PC Wargame" award. They dubbed it "the most detailed, authentic, and convincing simulation of modern naval warfare yet devised."

Tim Carter reviewed Harpoon Battleset 3: The MED Conflict for Computer Gaming World, and stated that "Harpoon: Battleset Three: The Mediterranean Conflict is an entertaining and thought-provoking addition to the Harpoon system. The combination of imaginative scenarios with new (and/or outdated) platforms and situations give the battleset a distinctive style of play that sets it apart from the Atlantic battlesets."

Tim Carter reviewed Harpoon BattleSet 4: Indian Ocean / Persian Gulf for Computer Gaming World, and stated that "Despite the lack of creativity in the generation of scenarios, Battleset Four: The Indian Ocean/Persian Gulf is a useful addition to the Harpoon system. Players who use the Scenario Editor will find that the new platforms make the package worth the price."

In 1994, PC Gamer US named Harpoon the 36th best computer game ever. The editors called it "probably the best known and most successful naval war game there's ever been. It's still selling today, even five years after its initial release, and military academies have been known to use the game as a training aid. Now that's realism!" In 1996, Computer Gaming World declared Harpoon the 40th-best computer game ever released. The magazine's wargame columnist Terry Coleman named it his pick for the third-best computer wargame released by late 1996.
