= Cauldron (Bond novel) =

1993 novel by Larry Bond and Patrick Larkin

- First edition
- Author: Larry Bond, Patrick Larkin
- Language: English
- Genre: Thriller, war
- Publisher: Warner Books
- Publication date: 1993 (hardbound), April 1994 (paperback)
- Publication place: United States
- Media type: Print
- Pages: 768 pp (paperback edition)
- ISBN: 0-446-60026-1

Cauldron is a technothriller novel by Larry Bond. The book explores a fictional modern world war scenario, set in the 1990s and involving the dissolution of NATO.

== Plot ==
=== Background ===
Economic upheaval around the world in the early 1990s becomes an opportunity for France and Germany to consolidate their power in Europe through an alliance called the European Confederation or EurCon. However, it is a continental partnership in name only; France provides the political power with the Germans carrying the economic muscle. The instability and the countries' political differences with the United States causes the dissolution of NATO in 1996.

=== Story ===
The main plot takes place in 1998. Because North African immigrants are flooding Europe looking for work, riots in France and Germany prompts both countries to force a number of former Warsaw Pact nations to accept them in various factories. The first of these is a Eurocopter plant in Hungary. To further ensure subservience to EurCon, military governments are installed in several countries. The Russian army launches a coup in Moscow as well and put the incumbent Russian president under house arrest.

Poland, the Czech Republic, and Slovakia stand up against EurCon, which gradually deploys combat troops to their borders. France also negotiates with Russia to stop natural-gas shipments to Poland. The United States comes in to support Poland by sending an LNG tanker to Gdańsk; French covert operatives, however, blow it up in the harbor. The U.S. Navy starts sending armed convoys to force a breakthrough of the Baltic Sea and keep the supply lines open.

French oppression in Eastern Europe comes to a head in May 1998 when a people's uprising in Budapest results in the puppet regime's collapse. Seeing the turmoil as a potential harbinger for unrest, France orders military forces to subjugate the Hungarians days later; however, the Hungarian Army slows down the French assault.

The French and Germans invade Poland two months after the attack on Hungary. Because of heavy opposition, the Poles figure out that the EurCon armies plan to envelop Polish forces in a pincer movement and pull them out to safe havens in Eastern Poland. Meanwhile, the US convoys in the North Sea are still on track for Poland. EurCon mobilizes their air forces to stop the Americans, who have laid a trap. Much of the EurCon strike force is destroyed, and a last-ditch attempt to destroy the U.S. fleet with ASMP nuclear-tipped missiles is thwarted. The failed nuclear attack forces the US to launch Operation Counterweight - a concerted strike on enemy facilities in France and Germany proper. A B-52 raid levels French resupply facilities in Metz while a surgical strike destroys France's S3 IRBM silos in the Plateau d'Albion, Vaucluse. Some EurCon planes in the Polish front are sent home for local defense.

Behind the scenes, the French seeks Russian intervention against the anti-EurCon forces, which are fighting delaying actions to buy time for the American troops disembarking in Gdańsk. CIA operatives make contact with loyalist Russian officers and learn that the EurCon-Russia treaty will both lead to a massive Russian invasion of Europe and French support for an ultra-nationalist plan for Russia to forcibly re-create the Eastern Bloc; the CIA agents are shocked when the lead loyalist officer bluntly says that the treaty can be killed off by wiping out the top conspirators before they can send enforcement orders from Moscow. Although the negotiations are complete, the assassination team successfully eliminates emissaries from both sides before the orders are transmitted. The Russian President is also rescued and Russian forces assembling at the Polish frontier waiting for the attack signal are ordered to withdraw instead.

The EurCon offensive is finally stopped when elements of the US 101st Airborne Division hold the line in a wooded area near the town of Swiecie in time for other US armored units to reinforce them. Angered at the lack of reconnaissance of the US lines, French commanders consider redirecting part of the other EurCon forces in Hungary to join the push north. A German colonel already angry at the French holding back their troops while German forces are left to die as cannon fodder leads fellow troops in deserting the French. The Germans fight off a French attack on their command post. Word of the attack and the revelations about the Franco-Russian negotiations leads Germany to sever their ties with EurCon; the German chancellor who negotiated the country's membership is forced to resign. With US assistance, Belgium and the Netherlands declare war on France, which finds itself bereft of allies when the other EurCon member-states desert as well.

The French Fifth Republic also falls; French Foreign Minister Nicolas Desaix, who engineered the establishment of EurCon, is arrested and petty thugs hired by the DGSE kill him in his cell. The murder prompts the newly established French Sixth Republic to finally take action against the DGSE and its associated organizations. With the war finally over, the United States hosts an international free-trade summit in London. US troops in Poland also return home.

== Characters ==
=== French ===
- Nicolas Desaix - Foreign Minister and later President

=== Americans ===
- Ross Huntington III - industrialist and close friend of the U.S. President

=== Germans ===
- Wilhelm von Seelow - Bundeswehr colonel who is elected into the Bundestag after the war.

== Critical reception ==
The book received positive reviews.

Kirkus Reviews praised the novel for its cast of characters and accurate presentations of military tactics.

Publishers Weekly commended the book for prose that easily advances the plot, but stated that the "too warm and fuzzy" epilogue should have been left out.
