= Sands of Fire =

1989 video game

- Developer: Three-Sixty Pacific
- Publisher: Three-Sixty Pacific
- Platforms: Classic Mac OS, MS-DOS
- Release: 1989: Mac; 1990: MS-DOS
- Genre: Vehicle simulation

Sands of Fire is a vehicle simulation game published by Three-Sixty Pacific in 1989 for Classic Mac OS and in 1990 for MS-DOS

== Gameplay ==
Sands of Fire is a game in which a tank simulation takes place during World War II in North Africa.

== Reception ==
Bob Proctor reviewed the game for Computer Gaming World, and stated that "Frankly, Sands of Fire is a competent program that does not break any new ground in computer gaming. Still, graphics and sound are above average and, though it is not an overly accurate simulation, it has enough realistic "feel" to satisfy many of us. Further, it is very easy to play and successfully recreates some of the feel of the frenzied tank battles around Tobruk."

The MAC version of the game was voted best war game of 1989 by Computer Entertainer magazine.
