= Thud Ridge: American Aces In 'Nam =

1988 video game

- Developer(s): Acme Animation
- Publisher(s): Three-Sixty Pacific
- Designer(s): Dave O'Mally; Tris Orendorff; Brian Hilchie
- Artist(s): Gordon Dean Griffiths; Dan Hoecke
- Composer(s): Krisjan Hatlelid; Krishna Bera
- Platform(s): Commodore 64, MS-DOS
- Release: NA: 1988
- Genre(s): Flight simulation
- Mode(s): Single-player

Thud Ridge: American Aces in 'Nam is a computer game published by Three-Sixty Pacific in 1988 for the Commodore 64 and MS-DOS.

== Plot ==
Thud Ridge is a combat flight simulator that allows the player to pilot a Republic F-105 Thunderchief—also known as a "Thud"—during the Vietnam War. The player must contend with enemy MiGs, SAMs, flak, and a MiG ace pilot called the Grey Ghost. Thud Ridge includes 10 missions, and players determine the level of simulation difficulty by choosing from Lieutenant, Captain, or Colonel level. The player earns the Bronze Star by completing Missions 1 through 3, the Silver Star and a promotion to Colonel by completing Missions 4 through 6, and membership in the Wild Weasel Thud Drivers if the player completes all ten missions.

Title screen

== Gameplay ==
Thud Ridge uses few commands to operate the aircraft. It does not have digitized sound, but beeps indicate actions such as weapons firing. The player controls the flight of the aircraft using a joystick or keypad, and the player uses the keyboard to control other functions. The game has four basic screens that show different aspects of the jet and its flight. One screen allows the player to view the aircraft functions. The main display includes a real-time view of the Thud and the surrounding geography, and also the weapons and firing information. The plane uses an automatic weapons cursor, which changes shape to match the weapon in use. The Engine Function Panel can appear beneath the real-time graphics display, and presents gauges which show the engine and nozzle temperatures and fuel levels, as well as data such as the throttle of the plane, an indicated for the afterburner, the mission time elapsed, a warning for radar-lock, and a graphic display showing the Thud and its remaining weapons. One more screen shows where SAM installations can be found, and another screen shows a map.

== Reception ==
The game was reviewed in 1989 in Dragon #151 by Hartley, Patricia, and Kirk Lesser in "The Role of Computers" column. The reviewers gave the game 3 out of 5 stars. A 1992 Computer Gaming World survey of wargames with modern settings gave the game two stars out of five.

== See also ==
- Thud Ridge
