= Turbo Tape Games =

Independent game developer in western Norway

Turbo Tape Games AS
- Industry: Video games
- Founded: 2008
- Founder: Fredrik Sundt Breien; Jan Haugland
- Headquarters: Bergen, Norway
- Key people: Fredrik Sundt Breien (managing director), Andreas Johansen (technical director), Øyvind Lien (art director), Tor-Inge Jenssen (programmer), Espen Sæverud (programmer), Børge Femsteinevik (programmer), Marie Møller Jepsen (project manager)
- Products: Naval War: Arctic Circle
- Number of employees: 7

Turbo Tape Games, started in 2008, is an independent game developer in western Norway. The company also produces educational digital experiences, but focuses on entertainment games as its primary objective. Naval War: Arctic Circle, released in 2012, was the company's first major game, providing a real time strategy experience of modern naval warfare. Turbo Tape Games has worked on projects for clients such as the Bergen Science Centre VilVite, Sintef, TV2 News, Bodø University College, Bergen Museum amongst others.

== History ==
Fredrik Breien and Jan Haugland developed a working relationship with the Bergen Science Centre VilVite, combining creativity, game design, software development to deliver interactive exhibitions to teach children about science and technology.

Breien, on short notice, stepped in to give a talk at a conference, replacing an airport-stuck key speaker, and delivered a lecture on games and game design. Attending was Dave Spilde, a founder of several businesses who was there to give his own talk (on digital distribution of cinema). An avid gamer, he dreamed about starting a game studio. Upon hearing the talk, he decided he would want to talk to Breien.

Turbo Tape Games was founded and incorporated in February 2008.

== Projects ==
As independent game developer, Turbo Tape Games upholds two internal entertainment game productions.

=== Naval War: Arctic Circle ===
The first, Naval War: Arctic Circle, is a naval real-time strategy (RTS) title released in 2012. The game is supported by the Norwegian Film Institute, Innovation Norway and the Norwegian Research Council, and is developed in close consultation with the Royal Norwegian Navy. Published by Paradox Interactive, it is Turbo Tape Games' first standalone game production, and plans exist for potential expansions and future episodes.

=== Other projects ===
- Velocipede – an online cycle manager also supported by the Norwegian Film Institute, is a web based manager game planned launched in Scandinavia in early 2011.
- Slukhalsen: An installation for learning about digestion and nutrition (VilVite 2009)
- InBetween: An interactive tool for use in teacher education (UiN 2010)
- The Wonder Raft: Experiences for learning about fisheries and fish farming (Firda Sea Food 2010)
- TV2 News: Pirate Hunt: Live coverage of naval missions in the bay of Aden (TV2 News 2009)
- Virtual Fedje: Interactive presentation of Fedje in change (Sintef/Fedje Municipality 2011)
- Pelle the Paintrbush: Game of graphics development over three decades (Art Museums of Bergen 2010)
