= Command: Modern Air Naval Operations =

2013 video game

Command: Modern Air/Naval Operations
- Developer: Warfare Sims
- Publisher: Matrix Games
- Designer: Dimitris Dranidis
- Platform: Windows
- Release: September 24, 2013
- Genres: Real-time strategy, warfare
- Mode: Single-player

Command: Modern Air Naval Operations is a warfare simulation video game developed by Greek studio Warfare Sims and published by Matrix Games, and was released on September 24, 2013. Often described as the spiritual successor to the legacy Harpoon series, Command expanded on both the scope and detail of simulation compared to Harpoon and was designed to overcome the earlier series' limitations.

== Gameplay ==
In Command: Modern Air Naval Operations, players have operational control over units on a 2D map of the Earth. Similar to Harpoon, players can command their units using preset missions or by giving direct instructions of the "Go here, do this" variety.

The size and scale of the engagements depend only on the scenario; the engine can perform small patrol boat battles right up to global warfare, with hardware performance being the only relevant limitation to scale. Individual scenarios vary from a few hours to multiple days of real-time, although time can be accelerated to allow faster completion of operations.

No multiplayer mode is currently included with the commercial license for any game in the series. Both games also feature a scenario editor that allows for real-time changes to scenarios under construction, allowing battles in the editor to be run and changed instantly. Copies purchased from the Steam platform allow users to share such user-made scenarios through the Workshop.

== Development ==
The Warfare Sims development team released several updates containing new simulation mechanics, improvements, and bug fixes based on player feedback.

Upon release of its sequel, Command: Modern Operations, on November 14, 2019, Command: Modern Air Naval Operations was taken down from the Steam Store and the Matrix Games website, although those who had previously purchased the game on Steam did not have it removed from their library.

=== Downloadable content ===
New scenarios are available for purchase in the form of downloadable content. One such scenario, Northern Inferno, released on 22 October 2015, depicts a World War III between NATO and the Warsaw Pact in 1975. It has 15 levels, whereas another one, Command Live, is a series of one-level scenario downloadable content packs that deal with contemporary events.

=== Professional Edition ===
An official "professional edition" was unveiled in May 2015, offering advanced functionality tailored to the needs of defense-related professionals and organizations. Features exclusive to the Professional license include full database-editing access, umpire-controlled WEGO-style multiplayer, Monte-Carlo mode (statistical analysis), data import/export and more. These additional abilities are offered piecemeal to allow customers to tailor Command to their needs. One of the first unveiled professional customers has been BAE Systems.

== Reception ==
SimHQ gave the game a rating of 9.5/10. Rock Paper Shotgun contributor Tim Stone criticized the game for feeling incomplete compared to its competitors, specifically remarking on its lacking audio presentation, lack of multiplayer, as well as its high launch price.

Command: Modern Air Naval Operations was picked as the "Top Simulation of 2013" by Eurogamer of Denmark.

== Awards ==
CMANO and CMO have received numerous industry & press awards, including:

- TIGA Awards 2024 – Best Education, Serious Or Simulation Game
- Charles S. Roberts Awards 2019 – Best Modern-Era Computer Wargame
- MS&T Magazine Industry Simulation & Training Awards 2017 – Finalist
- GrogHeads readers Choice Awards 2013 - Digital Wargame of the Year and overall Digital Game of the Year
- Eurogamer.dk - Best Simulation of 2013
- USENET Wargame of the Year 2013
- War Is Boring Best War Games of 2013

== Sequel ==
Command: Modern Operations is a sequel released on November 14, 2019. While the core gameplay and mechanics are largely similar to its predecessor (maintaining backward compatibility with Command: Modern Air Naval Operations scenarios), Command: Modern Operations runs on a newer version of its 32-bit engine. Among the main features that differentiate it from Command: Modern Air Naval Operations are: Tacview integration (allows for a live 3D view of a scenario, although scenario recording and playback is not supported for Command: Modern Operations at this time); a quick-battle generator; detailed satellite maps of the entire planet; and automatic image fetching for a number of common entries in the databases (an internet connection is required for the on-the-fly image download of both); a new UI; realistic submarine communication; and terrain effects on ground operations and weapon deployment. Also included are the latest versions of the DB3000 and Cold War databases that Command: Modern Air Naval Operations and the prior Harpoon games utilized. These determine the number, properties, and capabilities of all the weapon systems and units in the game.

== See also ==
- Naval War: Arctic Circle
- Jane's Fleet Command
- Dangerous Waters
