= V for Victory: Velikiye Luki =

1992 video game

- Developer: Atomic Games
- Publisher: Three-Sixty Pacific
- Platforms: DOS, Macintosh
- Release: 1992
- Genre: Computer wargame

V for Victory: Velikiye Luki is 1992 computer wargame developed by Atomic Games and published by Three-Sixty Pacific. It is part of the V for Victory series.

== Gameplay ==
As with all games in the V for Victory series, the game is played on a hex map with units represented by coloured squares. Control is with the mouse, using normal gestures like clicking, dragging and shift-clicking to input commands. Much of the system is automated, with the computer taking over behind-the-scenes roles like handling the movement of supplies and the introduction of reinforcements.

This scenario pack covers the Soviet offensive against the German occupation during the Battle for Velikiye Luki in late 1942. The city is bisected by the Lovat River, and crossing it represents a significant logistical challenge for the Soviet side. The game is marked by slow movement as each side attempts to gather its supplies in an effort to take the offensive.

There are several scenarios that can be played on either side, with the most basic also being used as the tutorial for new players. In addition to the scenarios, there are several options that affect global settings like the amount of supplies and the weather.

== Reception ==
A 1993 survey of wargames gave V for Victory II: Velikiye Luki three-plus stars.

John Vanore reviewed the game in Computer Gaming World for their April 1993 edition. He was generally very positive, stating that it was "an excellent extension of the series." He does point to some vocal criticism by players, especially over a distinct lack of aggressiveness on the part of the computer when it commands the Soviet forces, but passes this off to the Soviets having little supply. The only major complaint he had was that the game was initially not able to be played within the game engine of the earlier entries in the series, noting that the company admitted this was a mistake and was looking to fix it. He concludes that "I wholeheartedly recommend it to any Mac or DOS computer gamer."

In contrast, while writing about the last instalment in the series months later in the same magazine, Terry Coleman was far less impressed. He criticized Velikiye Luki as buggy and flawed, and described the boring gameplay as "perilously close to sleepwalking."

The game was awarded war game of the year by Computer Game Review.
