= V for Victory: Market-Garden =

1993 video game

V for Victory: Market Garden
- Developer(s): Atomic Games
- Publisher(s): Three-Sixty Pacific
- Platform(s): DOS, Macintosh
- Release: 1993
- Genre(s): Computer wargame

V for Victory: Market Garden is 1993 computer wargame developed by Atomic Games and published by Three-Sixty Pacific. It is part of the V for Victory video game series.

== Gameplay ==
The game covers Operation Market Garden and various actions by the units involved.

== Development ==
The game was released for Mac computers in March 1993.

== Reception ==
A 1993 survey of wargames in Computer Gaming World gave V for Victory III: Market Garden four stars. Another reviewer for the magazine criticized Market Garden as buggy and flawed.

Chris W. McCubbin reviewed V for Victory: Market Garden in Pyramid #4 (Nov./Dec., 1993), and stated that "V For Victory's sophistication is not easy to summarize in a nutshell. This game does so many things so effortlessly that it's impossible to list all its surprising capabilities in a review this size. My advice, if you have any interest at all in strategic computer games, is simply to check out V For Victory: Market Garden for yourself. I doubt you'll be disappointed."

In 1994, the editors of PC Gamer US wrote, "The V for Victory series is quite simply the most playable war games available, with an easy-to-master interface and admirable depth of game play." They continued, "We single out Utah Beach because it launched the series — but by all means, check out Velikiye Luki, Gold*Juno*Sword, and Market Garden, too."

The V for Victory series collectively won Computer Games Strategy Plus's 1992 "Game of the Year" award. The magazine's Brian Walker wrote that it "achieved what many computer wargames have been trying to do for years: successfully convert a board wargame onto computer." Computer Games likewise named it the year's best wargame.
