= Patrick Larkin (novelist) =

American novelist

- Born: Patrick Larkin; 1959 or 1960 (age 65–66)
- Education: University of Chicago
- Occupations: Novelist; speechwriter
- Children: 2
- Writing career
- Notable works: Vortex; Cauldron
- Website: www.patricklarkin.net

Patrick Larkin (born 1959 or 1960) is an American novelist and speechwriter. He worked with Larry Bond on several novels, such as Red Phoenix, Vortex (1991), Cauldron (1993), The Enemy Within (1996), and Day of Wrath (1998).

== Early life and early career ==
Larkin received a high school diploma from Kennewick High School in Kennewick, Washington, in 1978 and a degree from the University of Chicago. At the beginning of his career, he was among a group of 14 staff for Congressional Republicans whom he worked three years for. As part of his job, he was the speechwriter for 140 members of the United States House of Representatives. He was a speechwriter for John S. Herrington, the United States Secretary of Energy. After quitting his Washington, D.C. job, Larkin became a Pacific Gas and Electric Company speechwriter at their San Francisco office to fulfill his wish to be close to his family.

== Later career ==
During a war games get-together hosted at a Virginia house, Larkin got to know Bond and Tom Clancy after they completed the novel Red Storm Rising. Bond befriended Larkin. Bond invited Larkin to collaborate with him on writing a book when they were guests at a bachelor party. In 1987, after he and Bond were given a $150,000 advance payment per person, they started working on the 1989 novel Red Phoenix. William Morris Agency's Robert Gottlieb was the duo's agent. The book's cover does not have Larkin's name owing to publishers' preference to have only one name there for marketing reasons. In a 2007 interview with The Times, Larkin said, "In those days, it was quite unusual to have two names appearing on the front of the book, so Larry's name went on." The book's copyright page bears his name. He equally split the royalty payments with Bond. Red Phoenix had 250,000 hardcover copies released in June 1989 and one million paperback copies in May 1990. The Wall Street Journal ranked the book as third on its best seller list. The New York Times Best Seller list included for 15 weeks where the book at one point was ranked sixth. Larkin and Bond signed a $1 million agreement to collaborate on producing two more books. Although the duo would each receive 50% of the money, the next two books' covers would again omit his name.

Larkin authored several books in a Robert Ludlum series after Ludlum had died. With a close due date, the editors gave him a sketch of the plot and he was unable to spend much time "getting the voice just right". In the Covert-One series, Larkin wrote The Lazarus Vendetta (2004) and The Moscow Vector (2005). The Globe and Mail's Margaret Cannon reviewed Larkin's book Robert Ludlum's The Moscow Vector. She wrote that the book "makes liberal use of the late Robert Ludlum's name", and said, "The actual author is Patrick Larkin, and while he may be channelling Ludlum's spirit, he's not imbued with Ludlum's talent."

== Personal life ==
Larkin is married and has two children.
