= Vortex (Bond and Larkin novel) =

1991 novel by Larry Bond and Patrick Larkin

- First edition cover
- Author: Larry Bond, Patrick Larkin
- Cover artist: Peter Thorpe (design/illustration)
- Language: English
- Genre: Thriller, war novel
- Publisher: Little, Brown and Warner Books
- Publication date: June 1991; 35 years ago
- Publication place: United States
- Media type: Print (Paperback)
- Pages: 909 pp (paperback edition)
- ISBN: 0-446-51566-3 (first edition, hardback) & ISBN 0-446-36304-9 (Paperback edition)
- OCLC: 23286496
- Dewey Decimal: 813/.54 20
- LC Class: PS3552.O59725 V6 1991

Vortex is a 1991 war novel by Larry Bond and Patrick Larkin. Set during the final years of apartheid in South Africa, Vortex follows the assassination of a reformist National Party president and his cabinet by the African National Congress, as well as a subsequent seizure of power by far-right Afrikaners. The plot unfolds through a series of intertwining accounts narrated through several characters. It was a commercial success, receiving generally positive reviews.

A Vortex audiobook, presented by David Purdham, was released via Simon Schuster Audio in August 1991.

== Setting ==
Vortex is initially set during bilateral negotiations to end apartheid in South Africa during the early 1990s. Despite conservative opposition, the ruling National Party and newly elected State President Frederick Haymans secretly discuss options for reform with the African National Congress (ANC). However, beneath the surface tensions remain high, with both parties facing immense pressure from their radical wings and internal resistance to apartheid escalating. The National Party is unwilling to consider a universal franchise, which forms the crux of the ANC's demands, while for its part the ANC refuses to cease planning guerrilla operations.

== Plot ==
Despite strict instructions to avoid provoking unnecessary confrontations with the ANC's armed wing, the Umkhonto we Sizwe (MK), Karl Vorster, the South African Minister of Law and Order, authorises a raid by the 44 Parachute Brigade on suspected MK bases in Zimbabwe. Vorster—a hardline conservative and secret Afrikaner Weerstandsbeweging sympathiser—is roundly criticised by President Haymans and his reformist Cabinet for his actions. However, the paratroopers succeed in recovering valuable intelligence on "Broken Covenant", a proposed MK operation to assassinate Haymans as he travels to Pretoria from Cape Town aboard the Blue Train for the parliament's summer recess. This incident comes at a time when negotiations between Haymans and the ANC are approaching a major breakthrough, so MK decides to abort the attack.

Sensing an opportunity to seize power himself with the current leadership eliminated, Vorster excuses himself from the Blue Train and eliminates the ANC courier assigned to transmit the abort signal to MK forces. The oblivious guerrillas carry out the attack as planned, killing Haymans and his entire Cabinet. A triumphant Vorster then assumes the presidency and declares a state of emergency, giving the South African Police free rein to crack down on anti-apartheid movements. Diplomatic relations with the rest of the world quickly sour, and thousands of those suspected of being affiliated with the ANC are executed or moved to remote internment facilities. Vorster also orders the South African Defence Force (SADF) to invade newly independent Namibia under the pretext of targeting MK training camps. At the behest of the Namibian government, thousands of Cuban troops redeploy from their bases in Angola to halt the SADF's offensive south of Windhoek. This leads to a prolonged war of attrition, with neither side being able to gain the upper hand.

Meanwhile, conditions in South Africa begin to worsen in response to Vorster's heavy-handed attempts at silencing domestic opposition. His use of lethal force against white dissenters and other Afrikaners in particular leads to militant secessionist movements in the Transvaal and Orange Free State. The fledgling regime also alienates the Inkatha Freedom Party and nominally independent KwaZulu, which results in a violent insurgency waged by Zulu radicals across Natal and an urban insurrection in Durban. SADF units in Cape Town also mutiny and intervene to protect civilians after several mass killings.

Taking note of these internal crises, General Antonio Vega, commander of the Cuban military mission in Namibia, proposes an invasion of South Africa itself. Bolstered by new shipments of Soviet arms, and troops from several other socialist African nations, Vega duly sends three tactical battle groups into the Transvaal. Having concentrated on the potential of a future Cuban attack on the Namibian front, South African intelligence agencies are taken by surprise. The SADF is also slow to mount an effective resistance because it is preoccupied with various revolts and a disproportionate amount of manpower and supplies are already committed to a major operation in Namibia.

As General Vega's forces advance eastwards towards Johannesburg, Vorster orders the deployment of South Africa's nuclear arsenal to save the city. A South African Mirage F1CZ drops a nuclear weapon on Vega's third tactical group, killing about three thousand Cuban and Libyan soldiers. The invasion force retaliates by bombarding SADF defenders with sarin gas at Potgietersrus; appalled by the carnage affecting innocent civilians, the ANC—which had previously embraced the Cubans as liberators—breaks off its alliance with Vega. Havana then authorises the use of human shields to discourage further South African nuclear strikes.

The war in South Africa triggers a global market crisis as the prices of precious metals spiral upward. Remaining Western support for Vorster's government evaporates shortly after a U.S. journalist, Ian Sherfield, leaks the truth about Broken Covenant to the international press. The United States and United Kingdom subsequently undertake direct military intervention in South Africa to depose Vorster and prevent Cuba or the Soviet Union from gaining control over the country's valuable mineral resources. U.S. Army Rangers launch an airborne assault on the Pelindaba with the intention of capturing all remaining South African nuclear weapons, while other allied forces make amphibious landings in Cape Town and Durban. When Vorster threatens to irradiate the mines on the Witwatersrand with nuclear waste material, American, British, and mutinous South African forces attack the Union Buildings and arrest him before the order can be given.

The remaining Cuban tactical groups are halted by U.S. air strikes just short of Pretoria; conceding defeat, Vega begins withdrawing his troops from the country. During the retreat, he and most of his general staff are killed by a disgruntled MK cadre. Because Vega sold them on an ultimate communist victory in South Africa, a humiliated Soviet leadership vows never to be involved in the continent again. Apartheid is formally abolished in the months after the fall of Vorster's government and a conglomerate of various political parties are brought to the table for establishing a multiracial federal republic with Johannesburg as its new capital. Vorster himself is later meted life imprisonment for his crimes.

== Characters ==
- Karl Vorster: State President of South Africa. Vorster is a hardline proponent of apartheid as well as a senior figure in the far-right Afrikaner Weerstandsbeweging. His dubious seizure of power and subsequent invasion of Namibia set into the motion the key events of the storyline. Ends the story being denied martyrdom, as he is sentenced to life imprisonment by a South African court with no chance of parole.
- Ian Sherfield: An American television journalist originally demoted to correspondent for South Africa by his network for his tactless treatment of a senior anchor. Sherfield's opposition to Vorster and independent investigation of his crimes leads to the latter's downfall.
- Emily van der Heijden: Daughter of the South African Minister for Law and Order and a journalist for a liberal, English language newspaper in Johannesburg. She falls in love with Sherfield and plays an instrumental role in his investigation of Vorster. Her father eventually commits suicide-by-cop when he aims a gun at Henrik Kruger (who was going to arrest him) and is shot to death by an American soldier in the aftermath of Vorster's overthrow.
- Frederick Haymans: Vorster's predecessor and State President of South Africa. Haymans is responsible for loosening much of the apartheid legislation and opening a dialogue with black political movements. At the beginning of the novel, Vorster knowingly permits his assassination so he can assume power.
- Henrik Kruger: Commanding officer of the 20th Cape Rifles, a South African mechanized infantry battalion. Kruger mutinies against Vorster and hides Ian Sherfield and Emily van der Heijden from his regime. Kruger becomes the new chief of staff of the South African Defence Force after Vorster's capture. Former lover of Emily van der Heijden, and he helps her and Sherfield because he still cares about her.
- Erik Muller: South Africa's Director of Military Intelligence. He is blackmailed into exposing Vorster's role in Haymans's assassination by Sherfield when it's revealed he is a pederast who arranges for sexual encounters with young black prisoners. He sets up Sam Knowles to be killed via a remote-control bomb, but Sam's foresight leads to him being exposed anyway, and Vorster's thuggish supporters torture and kill him for being gay and having sex with black youngsters.
- Antonio Vega: Commander of the Cuban expeditionary forces on the African continent. Vega successfully prevents the fall of Namibia early in the novel and later masterminds the Cuban invasion of South Africa, but is left short of his goal when a combined U.S.-British force arrest Vorster and ally themselves with a provisional government that OK's massive air strikes that lead Vega to concede defeat. During the humiliating Cuban force retreat, Vega and all of his senior staff are killed when a disgruntled MK operative sets off a remote-control bomb that obliterates them immediately.
- Rolf Bekker: A captain in South Africa's 44 Parachute Brigade, favoured by Vorster for carrying out clandestine operations. Bekker has a key role in most of the novel's major plot developments, including the initial raid on MK bases in Zimbabwe, the invasion of Namibia, tracking down the MK cadre responsible for killing President Haymans, and the attempted destruction of Henrik Kruger's mutinous battalion.
- Robert O'Connell: Acting commanding officer of the 1st United States Ranger Battalion. He leads the U.S. raid on Pelindaba to seize the nuclear weapons stored there, and later assists in Vorster's capture.
- Jaume Vasquez: General Vega's chief of intelligence and second in command during the Cuban campaign in South Africa. He sees Vega and the other Cuban military leaders killed in a remote-control bomb and reluctantly takes over as the leader of the Cuban withdrawal.
- Matthew Sibena: Ian Sherfield's Xhosa driver and a police informant.
- Sam Knowles: Ian Sherfield's cameraman and technical assistant. He is assassinated by South African intelligence during Sherfield's initial attempt at blackmailing Erik Muller, but he left information "in case the creep cheats" that lead to the full exposure of Vorster's treachery, and also leads to the deserved death of Muller.
- Adriaan de Wet: Chief of staff of the South African Defence Force. De Wet is depicted as utterly incompetent and negligent, although Vorster favors him for political reasons. His decision to micromanage the campaign in Namibia leads to a catastrophic South African defeat at Walvis Bay, and likewise his dismissal of intelligence reports on Cuban troop movements allows General Vega's invasion of South Africa to nearly succeed.
- Edward Hurley: High-level State Department diplomat who heads the Bureau of African Affairs, and becomes the most respected American official during the crisis for his brilliant analysis and accurate predictions. Assigned as the U.S. representative to the new South African government-building process after Vorster's fall.

== Reception ==
The novel earned positive reviews. Kirkus Reviews stated that the book will satisfy readers disappointed by the quick resolution of the Persian Gulf War's Operation Desert Storm. It noted that the political scenes were "broad-brushed" compared to the battle scenes.

Publishers Weekly said the novel is an "extrapolation" of South Africa's political climate at the time it was published. The U.S. deployment into South Africa was highlighted as a potential example of future operations in locations it is not familiar with.
