= Armor Alley =

1991 video game

- Developer: Information Access Technologies
- Publisher: Three-Sixty Pacific
- Platforms: MS-DOS, Classic Mac OS
- Release: WW: 1991
- Genres: Scrolling shooter, wargame
- Modes: Single-player, multiplayer

Armor Alley is a combination computer wargame and horizontally scrolling shooter for MS-DOS and Classic Mac OS published by Three-Sixty Pacific in 1991. It is modelled on the Apple II game Rescue Raiders. Players can compete against the computer or other humans via LAN. The game supports cooperative multiplayer of up to two players per side. The player controls a helicopter armed with a limited number of munitions, such as missiles, bombs, machine guns, and napalm. The player requisitions computer-controlled tanks, infantry, engineers. Mobile missile platforms, and vans round out available firepower.

== Gameplay ==
The objective is to destroy an opposing base at the opposite end of the play area. Various units are deployed for this purpose, which can be assisted by the player's helicopter. The enemy has the same arsenal as the player, so tactics and convoy composition are vital. Only the van, which contains electronic warfare equipment, can achieve victory by coming into contact with the enemy base. Its armor is quite weak, so these units must be protected at all times.

The two-dimensional battlefield is a long strip of ground, with the player's base on the left end and the enemy's base on the right. Every map has these two bases, but each map has a different pattern of fixed terrain features. The game ends when one of these two bases is captured.

The player's view is always focused on the central unit, the helicopter. The helicopter carries two guided missiles, 10 bombs and has a machine gun with 64 rounds of ammunition (at higher levels the machine gun is replaced by six unguided missiles). The helicopter's fuel is limited, so each player must return to base before there is insufficient fuel left for the trip back. The helicopter is very vulnerable to enemy fire and so relies on its agility and the player's control to survive on the battlefield.

=== Budget ===
War funds slowly trickle into a spending account that allows purchase of units. Each unit has an associated cost. A helicopter costs 20, tanks four, mobile missile launchers three, vans two, infantry and engineers five. The player must spend wisely to ensure the purchase of equipment as needed. The further the helicopter is from its landing pad, the higher the rate of funding. The more assets the player has on the ground at the end of a battle, the more funds that will be available to start the next battle.

All units must be purchased by the player, but once bought, they blindly advance to the right towards the enemy base. Extra lives may be purchased by buying more helicopters

== Reception ==
The game was reviewed in 1991 in Dragon #166 by Hartley, Patricia, and Kirk Lesser in "The Role of Computers" column. The reviewers gave the game 5 out of 5 stars. 1992 and 1994 Computer Gaming World surveys of wargames with modern settings gave the game one and a half stars out of five, describing it as "a short entertaining diversion, but little of serious import".
