= Visions of Aftermath: The Boomtown =

1988 video game

- Developer: Mindscape
- Publisher: Mindscape
- Platform: MS-DOS
- Release: 1988
- Genres: Survival, role-playing

Visions of Aftermath: The Boomtown is a post-apocalyptic survival role-playing video game developed and published by Mindscape. It was released for MS-DOS in 1988.

== Gameplay ==
Visions of Aftermath: The Boomtown is a game in which the player attempts to survive after World War III.

== Reception ==
Jasper Sylvester reviewed the game for Computer Gaming World, and stated that "Above all, Boomtown is a unique game that should especially appeal to those who like economic simulations and multi-player competitions."
