= V for Victory: D-Day Utah Beach =

1991 video game

- Developer: Atomic Games
- Publisher: Three-Sixty Pacific
- Series: V for Victory
- Platforms: MS-DOS, Macintosh
- Release: NA: 1991
- Genre: Computer wargame
- Mode: Single-player

V for Victory: D-Day Utah Beach is a 1991 computer wargame developed by Atomic Games and published by Three-Sixty Pacific. It was widely lauded and repeatedly reviewed as the best wargame of its era. Its success led to three further games in the V for Victory series, and then the similar World at War series published by Avalon Hill.

The game simulates the D-Day invasion on the area surrounding Utah Beach and the greater Cotentin Peninsula area. The player takes the role of overall commander of the US forces or the German forces opposing them. The game includes six scenarios to play as either side, one of which covers the entire invasion area up to the period just prior to Operation Cobra.

== Gameplay ==
The game was played on a top-down 2D hex based map, with numerous terrain types. Each combat scenario has two phases. During the Planning phase, the player clicks on the unit icons to drag them to new locations. In the Execution phase, the player's battle plans are carried out.

The game engine included many features that could not be simulated in traditional board games in order to eliminate drudgery. For instance, each unit individually tracked its supply status and local reserve. New supplies were delivered at night, using a system that simulated flow from one of a number of "supply points", the beach area for the US, or roads to the south for the Germans. Cutting a supply route would cause the supplies to be re-routed onto other roads, which might lead to choking. Artillery fire could also be used to delay the flow. All of these effects were simulated, added to the on-hand supply level, and then displayed to the user as a series of optional colorings that indicated current status. Reduced supply levels dramatically reduced the combat and movement capabilities of the units, and represented the majority of the effects on fighting strength of the armies as a whole. Straying too far from a source of supply would render a unit impotent, while surrounding one would quickly lead to its elimination. In the same manner, the game tracked fatigue levels, unit cohesion, level of command, casualties and other effects for every unit on the map. Even weather became important, as it changed the supply deliveries and interdiction.

The amount of information held by the system might be overwhelming, but the majority of it was hidden and automated. Supply level, for instance, only became visible if the player selected an option to show it. In this case, it would be displayed as a colored outline around the units, from green (combat ready) to black (out of supplies). The player could generally ignore these details and leave it to the computer AI to handle these issues. This went as far as allowing the computer to plot artillery fire missions for supply interdiction. In most cases, the player was tasked with the movement of units and direct artillery support for attacks. Even these could be automated if desired, and were for the non-player side.

Many aspects of the game were designed to improve playability, especially for non-hardcore war gamers. For instance, the game used small icons of men or tanks to indicate unit types, instead of the more opaque NATO unit markers that are commonly used in the wargame field. On the Macintosh platform, existing UI guidelines were used for all operations. The game eschewed the traditional highly-modal interfaces of most games, using Mac menus, mouse commands and dialogs boxes for most interaction. For instance, giving commands to a unit to move was handled simply by clicking on the unit and then dragging it to the desired location, stacks of units could be moved with a shift-drag. This UI element has since become common.

== Plot ==
V for Victory: D-Day Utah Beach is a World War II battle simulation wargame based on the Normandy invasion. The player takes the role of a commander for either the American or German forces.

The game comes with six scenarios, with the first five simulating individual battles. In the first scenario, which is also the tutorial scenario and used for the free demo version, the player commands the 9th Infantry Division to eliminate the remaining German resistance behind American lines, or alternately, plays the collection of German units attempting to frustrate their advance. In the second scenario, the objective is for the 101st Airborne to take control of Carentan within three days. In the third scenario, the player must defeat an SS Panzergrenadier Division counterattack attempting to recapture Carentan. In the fourth scenario, the player attacks Cherbourg using four divisions, and in the fifth, the player attempts to completely isolate Cherbourg. The sixth scenario is a full campaign game that will take hours of play to complete.

The game also allowed the player to select a number of optional adjustments that influenced the battle. This included the ability to adjust the relative air strength of the two sides, from the default overwhelming advantage that the Allies had historically, to the unlikely event that the Germans might have slight air superiority - the manual stated that the events would not have taken place had the Germans maintained any major superiority in the air. Changing these settings has a dramatic effect on the amount of supplies flowing to the two sides; under the normal settings with complete Allied superiority, the Germans are constantly starved for supplies. The game also allowed the player to select the original airborne plan, which dropped the 82nd Airborne Division much further west; this plan had been changed just before D-Day after the discovery of new German units in the area. Additional German units, historically available but not committed to the battle, could also be brought into play.

Much of the battle follows historical lines, with the US slowly expanding their beachhead in the face of German troops entrenched in the bocage. Eventually their numerical superiority becomes overwhelming and the German forces are unable to cover all the gaps in the front line facing them. The slow movements through the bocages makes breakouts and encirclements difficult. Playing the Germans is significantly easier, consisting of a series of short retreats to new defensive lines as the US forces destroy the German units piecemeal.

Games are "scored" by capturing and holding strategic locations on the map. These vary from mission to mission, and the points that are scored in one mission may or may not appear in others. Generally speaking, the game rewarded fast advances toward major strategic locations, like Cherbourg. Points were also awarded for minimizing losses and maximizing enemy casualties, and removed for using limited resources like battleship fire.

== Development and production ==
V for Victory was initially developed under the name Cherbourg: The Battle of Utah Beach, and was set to be published by Interstel. It was purchased by Three-Sixty Pacific and renamed V for Victory. The cover art for the Utah Beach edition of the V for Victory series was created by Marc Ericksen.

== Reception ==
The Macintosh version of the game was reviewed in 1992 in Dragon #180 by Hartley, Patricia, and Kirk Lesser in "The Role of Computers" column. The reviewers gave the game 5 out of 5 stars, and noted "There is little doubt in our minds that this game is probably the best war simulation ever produced for any computer." Computer Gaming World in 1992 similarly praised the Macintosh version, stating that Three-Sixty Pacific "appears to have come closest to a perfect synthesis of the board and computer formats". The reviewer described the game as among the "'must-haves' ... a wargame designed by wargamers for wargamers". That year the magazine named it one of 1992's best wargames. A 1993 survey of wargames gave by a second reviewer the game four stars out of five, describing it as "perhaps the smoothest conversion of a boardgame-style wargame to computer format ever done".

It won the best wargame for 1992 in Computer Games Strategy Plus, and the overall Game of the Year. The magazine's Brian Walker wrote that it "achieved what many computer wargames have been trying to do for years: successfully convert a board wargame onto computer." V for Victory won the 1992 Origins Award for Military or Strategy Computer Game of 1992.

In 1994, PC Gamer US named Utah Beach the 14th best computer game ever. The editors wrote, "The V for Victory series is quite simply the most playable war games available, with an easy-to-master interface and admirable depth of game play." They continued, "We single out Utah Beach because it launched the series — but by all means, check out Velikiye Luki, Gold*Juno*Sword, and Market Garden, too."
