= Atomic Games =

American video game developer

Atomic Games, Inc.
- Type: Subsidiary
- Industry: Video games
- Founded: 1989
- Founder: Keith Zabalaoui
- Defunct: May 2011
- Fate: Dissolved together with parent
- Headquarters: Austin, Texas, U.S.
- Key people: Peter Tamte
- Parent: Destineer (2005–2011)
- Website: atomicgames.com

Atomic Games, Inc. was an American video game developer based in Austin, Texas, specializing in wargames. The company was founded by Keith Zabalaoui in 1989, and is best known for developing the Close Combat series of real-time wargames, as well as the V for Victory series. In December 2000, due to the cancellation of a project titled Hammer's Slammers, Atomic Games laid off its entire staff, only keeping three executives. Atomic Games was acquired by Destineer on May 6, 2005, while collaborating on Close Combat: Red Phoenix and Close Combat: First to Fight. Atomic Games was developing a third-person shooter, Six Days in Fallujah, in cooperation with Konami, until the latter decided to withdraw from the project in August 2009, causing significant layoffs at Atomic Games. The company went on to finish the game, but never released it. Atomic Games released the game called Breach, which is a multiplayer-only downloadable first-person shooter. Destineer also owned Bold Games, and MacSoft, who also went down with Destineer.

== With Avalon Hill ==
Avalon Hill, a game publishing company and subsidiary of Hasbro, signed with Avalon Hill in 1993 and they started developing Beyond Squad Leader and the World at War series for its new publisher. Rose, hired to lead Avalon Hill's computer game division in December 1992, had been tasked with reviving this section of the business in the face of flagging board game sales. The two companies' first collaboration, Operation Crusader, reused the engine of the V for Victory series. PC Gamer US wargame columnist William R. Trotter named it one of the top-five wargames of 1994.

Atomic and Avalon experienced creative friction during the development of their projects together. Computer Gaming World columnist Alan Emrich wrote in 1995, "To say there was no love lost between [...] Jim Rose and Atomic's Keith Zabalaoui would be a gracious understatement." By June 1995, Rose had left Avalon Hill to found TalonSoft, and Beyond Squad Leader had entered alpha testing.

== Games ==
- V for Victory: D-Day Utah Beach (1991)
- V for Victory: Velikiye Luki (1992)
- V for Victory: Market-Garden (1993)
- V for Victory: Gold-Juno-Sword (1993)
- Operation Crusader (1994)
- World at War: Stalingrad (1995)
- D-Day: America Invades (1995)
- Close Combat (1996)
- Close Combat: A Bridge Too Far (1997)
- Close Combat III: The Russian Front (1999)
- Close Combat: Battle of the Bulge (1999)
- Close Combat: Invasion: Normandy (2000)
- Close Combat: Marines (2004)
- Breach (2011)
- Six Days in Fallujah (TBD, early access in 2023)
