= Virtual Karts =

1995 video game

- Developer: MPS Labs
- Publisher: MicroProse
- Platform: DOS
- Release: 1995

Virtual Karts is a video game developed by MPS Labs and published by MicroProse for DOS in 1995.

== Gameplay ==
Virtual Karts is a go-kart race simulation game.

== Reception ==
Next Generation reviewed the PC version of the game, rating it three stars out of five, and stated that "It would have been a much better game if MPS Labs would have committed to the arcade quality and thrown in a few power-ups to supercharge your kart along the way. At the very least, it would have made things interesting."
