= Larry Bond =

American author and wargame designer

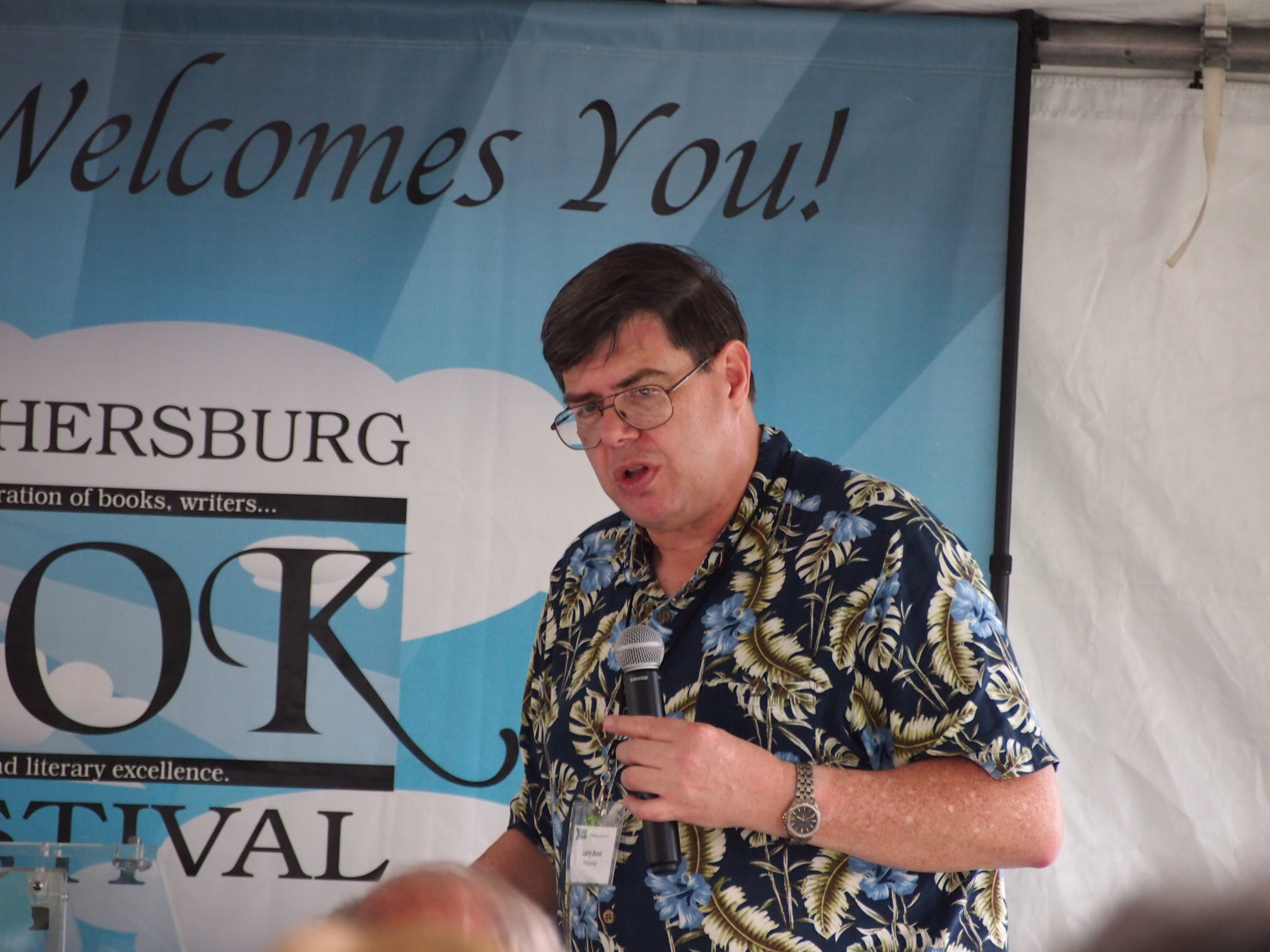
- Bond in 2015
- Born: Lawrence L. Bond; June 11, 1951 (age 75)
- Education: St. Thomas College
- Occupations: Author; wargame designer
- Writing career
- Language: English
- Years active: 1986–present
- Notable work: Red Storm Rising
- Website: www.larry-bond.com

Lawrence L. Bond (born June 11, 1951) is an American author and wargame designer. He is the designer of the Harpoon and Command at Sea gaming systems, and several supplements for the games. Examples of his numerous novels include Dangerous Ground, Day of Wrath, The Enemy Within, Cauldron, Vortex and Red Phoenix. He also co-authored Red Storm Rising with Tom Clancy.

== Early life and education ==
Bond was born on June 11, 1951, and grew up outside St. Paul, Minnesota. When he was eight years old, an uncle gave him a copy of Afrika Korps, spurring his lifelong interest in wargames. In 1973, Bond graduated from St. Thomas College with a degree in quantitative methods, and worked as a computer programmer for two years before joining the U.S. Navy.

== Career ==
=== U.S. Navy ===
Bond graduated from the United States Navy Officer Candidate School in Newport, Rhode Island, in 1976. He spent six years on active naval duty, including four years on destroyers, followed by two years in the Naval Reserve Intelligence Program. After leaving the navy, he worked as a naval analyst for defense consulting firms in the Washington, D.C., area.

=== Harpoon gaming system ===
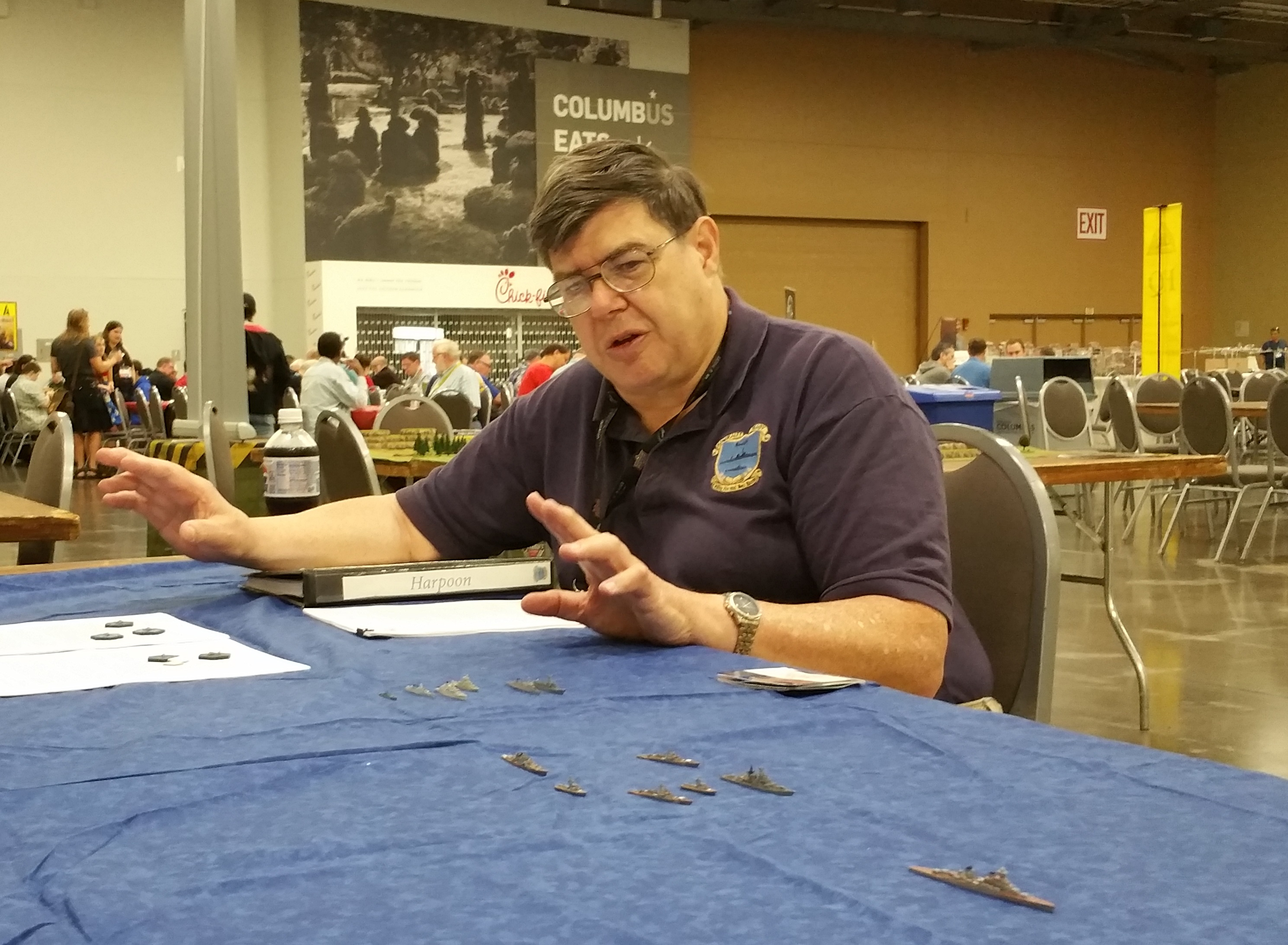
Author Larry Bond at Origins 2018

Bond's Harpoon gaming system was first published in 1980. Designed as a general-purpose air, surface, and submarine naval simulation, it combines playability with a wealth of information on modern naval weapons systems. Designed for the entry-level player, it has found acceptance in both the commercial market and the professional naval community. It is used at the Naval Academy, several ROTC installations, and on several surface ships as a training aid.

Now in its fourth edition, Harpoon won the H.G. Wells Award, a trade association honor, in both 1981 and 1987 as the best miniatures game of the year. The computer version of the game first appeared in 1989 and won the 1990 Wargame of the Year award from Computer Gaming World, an industry journal.

=== Literary career ===
Bond began his writing career by collaborating with Tom Clancy on Red Storm Rising (1986), a New York Times bestseller that was one of the best-selling books of the 1980s. It depicted a hypothetical conflict between NATO and the Warsaw Pact, drawing heavily on current analysis of what such a conflict would be like. It has been used as a text at the Naval War College.

Since then, Bond's books have depicted military and political crises, emphasizing accuracy and fast-paced action. Red Phoenix, Vortex, and Cauldron were all New York Times bestsellers. Red Phoenix is set in South Korea and depicts an invasion of the south instigated by the North Korean government. Vortex tells the story of a reactionary Afrikaner government trying to roll back the clock in South Africa. Cauldron shows a financial crisis in Europe that grew out of control, leading to a military confrontation between France, Germany and countries of the Eastern Europe (Poland, Czech Republic, Hungary) supported by the United States.

== Personal life ==
Bond makes his home in Springfield, Virginia. He and his wife Jeanne are the parents of two daughters.

== Bibliography ==
=== With Tom Clancy ===
- Red Storm Rising, 1986

=== With Patrick Larkin ===
- Red Phoenix, 1989
- Vortex, 1991
- Cauldron, 1993
- The Enemy Within, 1996
- Day of Wrath, 1998

=== With Chris Carlson ===
- Lash-Up, 2015
- Red Phoenix Burning, 2016

==== Jerry Mitchell Series ====
- Dangerous Ground, 2005
- Cold Choices, 2009
- Exit Plan, 2012
- Shattered Trident, 2013
- Burial at Sea, 2013
- Fatal Thunder, 2016
- Arctic Gambit, 2018

=== With Jim DeFelice ===
==== First Team Series ====
1. Larry Bond's First Team, 2004
2. Larry Bond's First Team: Angels of Wrath, 2006
3. Larry Bond's First Team: Fires of War, 2006
4. Larry Bond's First Team: Soul of the Assassin, 2008

==== Red Dragon Rising Series ====
1. Larry Bond's Red Dragon Rising: Shadows of War, 2009
2. Larry Bond's Red Dragon Rising: Edge of War, 2010
3. Larry Bond's Red Dragon Rising: Shock of War, 2012
4. Larry Bond's Red Dragon Rising: Blood of War, 2013

=== Edited by Larry Bond ===
- Crash Dive: True Stories of Submarine Combat, 2010
