= Three-Sixty Pacific =

American video game publisher and developer

- Type: Corporation
- Industry: video game industry
- Founded: 1987; 39 years ago in Campbell, California, United States
- Defunct: 1996
- Fate: Parent company, IntraCorp. dissolution
- Headquarters: 2105 South Bascom Avenue, Suite 290, Campbell, CA 95008, California
- Key people: Tom Frisina, CEO
- Products: Video games
- Parent: IntraCorp (1994 - 1996 r)

Three-Sixty Pacific was an American video game publisher and developer. Founded in the late 1980s by avid wargamers and military history enthusiasts, they were acquired by IntraCorp Entertainment Inc. in 1994.

== Games ==
They have developed the most popular naval game ever (according to MobyGames) called Harpoon (1989) (a game based on Larry Bond's tabletop wargame that was inducted into Computer Gaming 150 Best Games of All Time and is still regarded today as the best naval simulation ever produced), Harpoon 2 (1992), and Harpoon 3. They also made the popular Theatre of War (1992), which is considered one of the first multiplayer RTS games.

They developed a World War II naval strategy game called Victory at Sea (1993) which was a Mac (only?) computer game.

They published the game Dark Castle in 1987 and Armor Alley in 1990, both for the Macintosh computer.

Other games published: Thud Ridge: American Aces In 'Nam (1987/88), Das Boot (1992), Blue Max: Aces of the Great War (1990/91), Beyond Dark Castle (1989), High Command: Europe 1939-1945 (1992), Megafortress (1992), Patriot (1993), Sands of Fire (1990).

Their last projects were the V for Victory series (Gold-Juno-Sword (1992), Market-Garden (1993), D-Day Utah Beach (1991) and Velikiye Luki (1993)) and are Theatre of War 2. They also produced the game variant of the popular novel Das Boot. All the covers for Megafortress, Das Boot, and V for Victory titles featured cover art by illustrator Marc Ericksen.

Three-Sixty Pacific eventually acquired the rights to publish Battlecruiser 3000AD, but the company went out of business before the game's release.

Three-Sixty faced financial difficulties in late 1993. Computer Gaming World in February 1994 reported that Broderbund had agreed to become the company's distributor, and had advanced funds to complete Harpoon II and Victory at Sea.

== Reception ==
High Command was a runner-up for Computer Gaming World's 1993 "Wargame of the Year" award, which ultimately went to Clash of Steel. The editors wrote of High Command, "A refinement of the previously released game, this strategic tour de force by Gregg Carter and Joey Nonnast offers more hard data than the previous incarnation and a more comprehensive economic model. This is the wargame of choice for those who want a detailed, realistic simulation."

== See also ==
- V for Victory: D-Day Utah Beach
