= V for Victory =

- Genre(s): Turn-based strategy
- Developer(s): Atomic Games
- Publisher(s): Three-Sixty Pacific

V for Victory, or V4V for short, is a series of turn-based strategy games set during World War II. They were the first releases for Atomic Games who went on to have a long career in the wargame industry.

Like earlier computer adaptions of the board wargame genre, V4V used a hex-based map covering its area of action and used military markers to indicate the location of various units. However, V4V used a much simpler user interface where commands were given by point-and-click and dragging the units on-screen with the mouse, compared to arcane commands and map coordinates used in earlier games. At the same time, the game engine was able to simulate many operational factors that earlier games like Squad Leader had to ignore in order to avoid overloading the user with minutia.

The result was a wargame that was both easy to play and had considerably more operational detail at the same time. It was lauded by players and reviewers, who called it a "must have". The original scenario, D-Day Utah Beach, was a best-seller and was followed by three additional scenario packs. The system was written so that the scenarios plugged into a common base application, allowing users to launch newer games from whichever scenario they purchased first.

== Games ==
Four games were produced in the series:

=== D-Day Utah Beach ===
Covers operations in the Utah Beach and Cotentin Peninsula during the weeks after the initial D-Day invasions. Includes an optional scenario where the original airborne landing areas on the west coast of the peninsula were used.

=== Velikiye Luki ===
This scenario pack covers the Soviet offensive against the German occupation during the Battle for Velikiye Luki in late 1942.

=== Market-Garden ===
Covers Operation Market Garden and various actions by the units involved.

=== Gold-Juno-Sword ===
Revisits the D-Day beaches, this time covering the operations in the British and Canadian sectors and their battle to take Caen.

== Reception ==
A 1993 survey of wargames gave by a second reviewer V for Victory: D-Day Utah Beach four stars out of five, describing it as "perhaps the smoothest conversion of a boardgame-style wargame to computer format ever done". He gave V for Victory II: Velikiye Luki and V for Victory III: Market Garden three-plus and four stars, respectively. A third reviewer criticized Velikiye Luki and Market Garden as buggy and flawed. While praising V for Victory: Gold-Juno-Sword's documentation and SVGA graphics, he stated that the fourth game "succeeds only a technological level, bereft of soul" and compared the series to "a line of books without an editor". The reviewer concluded that "Three-Sixty's reputation in the hobby has suffered a major blow".

In 1994, PC Gamer US named Utah Beach the 14th best computer game ever. The editors wrote, "The V for Victory series is quite simply the most playable war games available, with an easy-to-master interface and admirable depth of game play." They continued, "We single out Utah Beach because it launched the series — but by all means, check out Velikiye Luki, Gold*Juno*Sword, and Market Garden, too."

The V for Victory series collectively won Computer Games Strategy Plus's 1992 "Game of the Year" award. The magazine's Brian Walker wrote that it "achieved what many computer wargames have been trying to do for years: successfully convert a board wargame onto computer." Computer Games likewise named it the year's best wargame.
