= Eidos =

Eidos may refer to:

- Eidos (philosophy), a Greek term meaning "form" "essence", "type" or "species"
- Eidos Interactive, a British video game publisher
  - SCi Entertainment Group, its parent, which was briefly renamed Eidos Ltd.
  - Eidos Hungary, a defunct Hungarian development studio formerly of Eidos Interactive
  - Eidos-Montréal, a Canadian development studio of the same group
- EidosMedia, an Italian publishing software company.
