= Black Knight Sword =

2012 video game

- Developer(s): Digital Reality; Grasshopper Manufacture
- Publisher(s): Digital Reality
- Director(s): Ren Yamazaki
- Producer(s): Shuji Ishikawa
- Designer(s): Ren Yamazaki
- Artist(s): Kazuyuki Kurashima
- Writer(s): Goichi Suda; Ren Yamazaki
- Composer(s): Akira Yamaoka
- Engine: Unreal Engine 3
- Platform(s): PlayStation 3, Xbox 360
- Release: NA: December 11, 2012 (PS3); NA: December 12, 2012 (360); EU: December 12, 2012; AU: December 12, 2012 (360); JP: January 10, 2013
- Genre(s): Platform, Metroidvania
- Mode(s): Single-player

Black Knight Sword (Note: Japanese: ブラック・ナイト・ソード, Hepburn: Burakku Naito Sōdo) is a side-scrolling platform game co-developed by Grasshopper Manufacture and Digital Reality. It was released in North America on the PlayStation 3 via the PlayStation Network on December 11, 2012 and on Xbox 360 via Xbox Live Arcade on December 12, 2012.

== Gameplay ==
Black Knight Sword has an Kamishibai art style.

Black Knight Sword is a side-scrolling platform game. Players control a character who takes on the identity of the Black Knight and his sword on their quest to defeat the White Princess. The game features a theater styled backdrop whereupon the character remains static as the backdrops change place to give the player a feeling of movement.

The player has a magical sword used to dispatch foes, and the game also features elements of platforming. Hearts can be collected from fallen enemies, which in turn can be used in various in-game shops to purchase equipment and upgrades.

== Plot ==
The game begins with a narrator stating "The wormwood sways back and forth, embracing the wind", as stage curtains open to reveal the set of a play, and the player character, Grahame Wormwood, having committed suicide by hanging himself in an empty bedroom. He sways back and forth to free himself from the noose around his neck, and what lies in front of him on the floor is a black suit of armor impaled with a sword, and a small, doll-like female character, known as Black Hellebore hovering above it. Black Hellebore then seems to inhabit the sword by phasing inside of it, and Grahame pulls the sword from the suit of armor. The black suit of armor then binds itself to Wormwood, as the play continues with Wormwood (now as the Black Knight), with the help of Black Hellebore, progressing through stage sets filled with hostile creatures, whom are often disembodied heads, other grotesque monstrosities, and wild animals.

The stage play is separated into and presented in 5 acts, with each act prefacing itself with fairy tale-like scenarios involving animals and their deaths. The animals in these stories serve as each act's finale. For example, one tale tells of a spider that saved a princess from entrapment, only to have been killed by her unassuming father upon her return. This spider then serves as the act's finale, with the Black Knight engaging it in battle. The narrator often tells the audience to "beware" before these encounters occur, and applauds the Black Knight when he defeats these creatures. This theme of Wormwood having to make his way past animals with seemingly unfortunate pasts continues until the play reaches its final act, which is prefaced with a story about two constantly bickering sisters. The story states that God disapproved of their arguing so much that He trapped the two inside of their own fairy tale, where they could bicker for the rest of eternity.

As the Black Knight makes his way to act 5's finale, the narrator (seemingly addressing the Black Knight himself) starts to question if he even remembers all the ones he's killed and loved. As color progressively fades from the set, the narrator continues to state that if they are forgotten, then there is "nothing left."

The Black Knight then finds himself standing in front of the hanged Grahame Wormwood, whom he cuts from his noose with his sword. The room then fills with white flowers as a White Princess appears. The Black Knight taunts the Princess and engages her in battle. The White Princess appears ethereal as she floats around, telepathically chucking disembodied heads at the Black Knight and growing to an inhuman size. She then begins throwing eggs at the Black Knight which hatch into the disembodied heads and grotesque creatures he's already been facing throughout the play, where it's revealed that the White Princess was in control of these creatures all along. After The Black Knight defeats the White Princess (with invaluable help from Black Hellebore), her body dissipates and leaves a white suit of armor and white sword behind, as a small, white, doll-like character emerges; White Hellebore. Black Hellebore and White Hellebore are the two sisters mentioned in the prefacing tale, and true to the story, they start fighting each other as the Black Knight watches on. White Hellebore then animates the white suit of armor, and the White Knight appears and begins to attack the Black Knight.

The game concludes with a battle between the Black Knight and the White Knight on a stage set that's looking down at the Earth. After the White Knight and White Hellebore are defeated, the Black Knight and Black Hellebore then return to the initial bedroom set of the play, passing all of the previous sets along the way. Before entering the room, Black Hellebore removes herself from the sword the Black Knight is holding and flies away, as the sword and the armor dissipate completely, with Wormwood freed from the armor's binding. Wormwood then enters the bedroom and once again hangs himself. The narrator then reiterates the line "The Wormwood sways back and forth, embracing the wind," and adds "one day, the fields themselves will wither and fade. The wormwood forgotten by all," as the stage curtains close and the play comes to an end.

== Development ==
Black Knight Sword was announced on August 17, 2011 at Gamescom. It was developed jointly by Grasshopper Manufacture and Digital Reality. The game is one of two collaborations between the two teams, the other being Sine Mora, with Digital Reality publishing the game. In response to an interviewer's question regarding the collaboration, Director of Publishing Balázs Horváth simply stated that the two teams "both know what makes a good game." The storyline and tone were based on an early draft of Kurayami, a game that was eventually reworked into Shadows of the Damned. A preview version was playable at Penny Arcade Expo (PAX) Prime 2011. It was also shown with a playable demo at PAX East 2012 in Boston, Massachusetts. Digital Reality has described the game as "Monty Python meets Czech animation meets Japanese paper theater." Composer Akira Yamaoka called the game "a throwback to the old-school classic side-scrolling action games." During early previews the game drew comparisons from critics to the Mega Man, Strider and Castlevania series.

== Reception ==
Reception

Aggregate score
Aggregator	Score	
Aggregator	PS3	Xbox 360
Metacritic	66/100	65/100

Review scores
Publication	Score	
Publication	PS3	Xbox 360
Destructoid	6.5/10	N/A
Electronic Gaming Monthly	5/10	N/A
Eurogamer	N/A	6/10
GameRevolution	3.5/5 stars	N/A
GameSpot	7/10	N/A
GameTrailers	5.7/10	N/A
GameZone	6/10	N/A
IGN	6.9/10	6.9/10
Joystiq	2.5/5 stars	N/A
Official Xbox Magazine (US)	N/A	7/10
Polygon	6/10	N/A
The Escapist	2.5/5 stars	N/A
Metro	N/A	6/10

Black Knight Sword received "mixed or average reviews" on both platforms according to the review aggregation website Metacritic.

Critics praised the game's art style, with Eurogamer stating, "Its richest ideas are to be found in the presentation, the aesthetic, the art direction and stage direction." Reviewers often criticized its gameplay, however. While Meristation praised the gameplay, stating, "Black Knight Sword is a good return to the roots of the 16-bit action games, well crafted, with an amazing design", other reviewers cited the game's difficulty as a point of contention. Joystiq wrote, "Yes, [the PSN version's] Normal mode itself is tremendously hard, but not in such a way as to make the struggle seem worth it, or even remotely do-able."
