= Imperium Galactica II: Alliances =

1999 video game

- Developer: Digital Reality
- Publisher: Infogrames (Note: Released in North America under the GT Interactive brand name.)
- Producer: Steven B. Sargent
- Programmers: István Kiss; Ferenc Szabó
- Writers: Csanád Bösze; Gábor Fehér; László Peller
- Composers: Tamás Kreiner; Gábor Pallos
- Platforms: Windows iPad; Android; MacOS; Linux
- Release: EU: December 1, 1999; NA: April 10, 2000
- Genres: 4X, real-time strategy, real-time tactics
- Modes: Single-player, multiplayer

Imperium Galactica II: Alliances is a video game featuring aspects of real-time tactics, real-time strategy and 4X elements from the Hungarian-based studio Digital Reality in 1999. It is the sequel to Digital Reality's previous game, Imperium Galactica. In 2016, the game was ported to iOS. The North American release is the final game to be released under the GT Interactive brand name, released shortly before Infogrames folded the label into its own studio in May 2000. In the strategy game community, it's still considered one of the all-time best Space RTS games.

== Gameplay ==
Gameplay involves managing colonies, expanding one's empire, conquering enemy planets, researching, diplomacy with other races, spying, space battles, ground battles and more. The game is notable for its innovative menu UI and its inclusion of ground battles, space battles, and a detailed city-building mechanic within a single 4X title.

== Plot ==
The story of Imperium Galactica II is not entirely linear. Instead, what is featured is several scenarios pitting one Empire against another, and the main campaign, where the player can choose one of three factions: The Kra'hen Empire, The Shinari Republic, or The Solarian Federation. Each race has different objectives in their respective campaigns, and the player can only win the campaign by meeting these dynamic goals or conquering the galaxy by eliminating all other factions:

- Kra'hen Empire – As part of a brutal and bloodthirsty race, they have a fetish for collecting the heads of their enemies and is entering the galaxy occupied by the other seven races in the game. As Imperator, the objective is to do whatever is necessary to appease the God-Emperor.
- Solarian Federation – Legend tells of four "Tears" (Data Crystals) strewn across the galaxy by your ancestors that have the power to make the Human race invincible, including resurrecting their dead leader. Representing the humans of the far-future, the Solarian Empire must recover these Tears through diplomacy, trade, and war. It is eventually discovered that many of the other races in the game such as the Iberon, Godan, and Toluen, were genetically-altered humans adapted to conform to specific climates.
- Shinari Republic – As the weakest race militarily, the Shinari Republic resorts to espionage and trade to turn things to their advantage. Upon encountering the Kra'hen, the players must aid the Solarians in uniting all the other races in the galaxy to face this common threat. When the Kra'hen are defeated, Shinari Republic turns down the Solarian Federation's offer for a galaxy-wide alliance because of war profit; instead, the players must somehow reanimate the Solarian Emperor Kaileron, whose clout and radical views would certainly plunge the galaxy back into conflict.

== Factions ==
There are eight unique races, which all have their own unique advantages and disadvantages in technology, diplomacy, and breeding.

In the game the following factions exist: Solarian Federation, Kra'hen Empire, Shinari Republic, Antarian Empire, Iberon Empire, Cheblon Clans, Godan Kingdom and the Toluen Empire. Each faction also has its own home planet and capital ship type.

During the Campaign a few other races and factions races are observed.

== Reception ==
In North America, Imperium Galactica II sold 50,843 units and earned $2.02 million from January through October 2000, according to PC Data.

The game was reviewed for Polish magazine Secret Service.
