= Dinosaur'us =

2001 video game

- Developer(s): RFX Interactive
- Publisher(s): Light & Shadow Production; Electronic Arts
- Platform(s): Game Boy Color
- Release: Game Boy Color: UK: 2 February 2001
- Genre(s): Platform, role-playing
- Mode(s): Single-player, multiplayer

Dinosaur'us is a platform and role-playing video game developed by RFX Interactive and co-published by Light & Shadow Production and Electronic Arts. It was released for Nintendo's Game Boy Color on 2 February 2001 in the United Kingdom. However, its release was cancelled in the United States.

The gameplay involved the player taking control of a newly hatched baby dinosaur and controlling it around the game, avoiding hazards and pits like in platform games. However, in addition, enemies were fought in turn-based fashion like on the Pokémon games which were popular on the same console at the same time. Health lost in battles with enemies could be regained in the platform play.

Multiplayer battles were available on the game via a link cable.

A lemmings-inspired PC puzzle game was also released in the same year, for Microsoft Windows. The PC version, developed by Digital Reality Software and published by LSP (Light & Shadow Production), was likely the first game bearing the name, as PC/Console games usually see portable counterparts shortly after release. The Game Boy version was likely published by EA because small PC game developers usually cannot afford licensing to publish their games on video game consoles and often have to make a deal with a larger publisher, but can affordably put a PC game on video game store shelves.
