= Imperium Galactica =

1997 video game

- Developer: Digital Reality
- Publisher: GT Interactive
- Producers: Jason Schreiber; Nick Bridger
- Designers: Gábor Fehér; István Kiss
- Programmers: István Kiss; Ferenc Szabó
- Composer: Tamás Kreiner
- Platforms: DOS, Windows
- Release: March, 1997
- Genre: 4X
- Mode: Single player

Imperium Galactica is a 1997 4X video game, developed by Digital Reality. The same company would later make its sequel, Imperium Galactica II, in 1999. Imperium Galactica was published and distributed by GT Interactive in 1997. The soundtrack is the work of Tamás Kreiner. Nexus: The Jupiter Incident, developed by the Hungarian-based Mithis Entertainment, was originally planned and designed as Imperium Galactica 3 but in development renamed and refocussed to a real-time tactics game. The game was re-released in 2016 on GOG.com with support for Windows.

== Gameplay ==
Imperium Galactica has both the combat and resource management elements of a real-time strategy game and the vast research tree and colony-building aspects of traditional turn-based 'space-empire-building' 4X games such as the Master of Orion series.

The player, in the role of a young Lieutenant named Dante, begins the game with command of a small capital ship - a Guardian-class Destroyer - and three Raptor-class Fighters (later in the game the player would command up to 28 capital ships and 180 fighters in one fleet), and three colonies, named Achilles, Naxos and San Sterling, unable to move beyond the boundaries of the small sector assigned for him to defend and expand. The story, concerning the Galactic Empire's current status in the 4th millennium, during the 3200's, serves as an entry point, gradually introducing the player to new concepts (planet management, space battles, ground battles, research, component & ship production, diplomatic functions) as he rises through the ranks from Lieutenant to Captain, Commander, Admiral and eventually Grand Admiral (where all functions are unlocked and the player has full control), all the while revealing through flashbacks, the character's shrouded past, that Johnson is the Galactic Empire's secret weapon that was created in desperation, an android.

Regardless of the player's actions, the galaxy outside his or her view continues to take shape even as they are completing the "training" ranks prior to being promoted to Admiral. In this way, a player who quickly defeats his initial enemies at early ranks might enter the larger galaxy before the other races have been too badly hurt by the antagonist species, the Dargslan Kingdom. A player might also take an excessive amount of time in these "training" missions and get promoted to find that the entire galaxy has been conquered, making the situation almost hopeless except by exploiting game bugs.

There are five research centers for five categories (Computer, Construction, A.I., Military, Machinery), but on each planet the player is only allowed one of these five categories, marked by a colored symbol on the system card. Each technology requires a certain amount of research centers in each of these five categories before it can be researched for trade goods or command counters (which require time and money). The player is forced to either demolish and rebuild research centers repeatedly, or gain new planets by either conquest or colonization (the latter becomes available relatively late into the game). A.I. players aren't bound to this limitation, because every A.I. has a fixed technology pool, which does not develop any further during the game. As a special exception, players may find in the beginning a single planet in Garthog space which has two research centers.

== Reception ==
Next Generation rated the game four stars out of five, and wrote that "Imperium Galactica is an excellent choice for strategy-game fans because it goes beyond a simple strategy game. The progression of the character, the additional responsibilities, and the total immersion of the player combined to form a truly enjoyable title that will keep players entertained for a long time".

The game was reviewed for Polish magazine Gambler.

== Legacy ==
The game spawned a sequel, Imperium Galactica II: Alliances. After GT Interactive's bankruptcy, the Imperium Galactica trademark was lost by Digital Reality and another Hungarian development studio called Philos Laboratories began work on Imperium Galactica 3: Genesis. Philos Laboratories lost the title when the lease expired and renamed the game Galaxy Andromeda. When the studio went bankrupt its successor, Mithis Entertainment, continued development and renamed the project Nexus: The Jupiter Incident. It has little to do with the Imperium Galactica franchise, and is a completely different type of game as well - what Mithis calls a "Tactical Fleet Simulator". The game tells the backstory for the original Imperium Galactica title.

A Galactic Empire Mod project was produced for the open-source Spring RTS engine. This effort, like several prior attempts, remains mired in "development hell", due to few skilled developers having both the time and interest to work on the project. Another group of fans works on open-ig and received permission from Digital Reality to reuse the original artwork to create a remake.
