= Reunion (video game) =

1994 video game

- Cover art
- Developers: Amnesty Design (now Digital Reality)
- Publishers: EU: Grandslam Entertainment; NA: Merit Studios Inc.
- Platforms: Amiga, MS-DOS
- Release: 1994 (PC/Amiga Floppy disk); 1995 (PC CD-ROM)
- Genres: Real-time strategy, adventure
- Mode: Single-player

Reunion is a space strategy video game. It was the first game by Hungarian game developer company Amnesty Design (now Digital Reality) and was released by the British publisher Grandslam Entertainment. In North America, it was sublicensed to Merit Studios and released under the name Merit's Galactic Reunion. The game was programmed by János Kistamás (Amiga), Krisztián Jámbor (Amiga), István Kiss (MS-DOS). The soundtrack was made by Tamás Kreiner.

== Plot ==
In the 27th century, centuries of peace have allowed great scientific progress in the development of the first interstellar warp drive. Two research ships, designated Explorer-1 and Explorer-2, are outfitted with the experimental drives and sent to find new planets for colonization. Of the two ships, only Explorer-2 returns to Earth. Refitted as a colony vessel, the Explorer-2 is once again ready to embark when, suddenly, peace is disrupted and the humans are ripped apart from each other. At the same time, a planet-wide rebellion stages a great coup and overthrows the Earthen government, throwing the world into chaos and severing the union. The Explorer-2, crewed by loyalist space forces, barely escapes the rebellion and leaves the Solar System. Years later, the Explorer-2 arrives damaged at its destination and a colony is set up, named New Earth. After many generations of separation from Earth, the colony is self-sufficient and able to develop a mission only the best can undertake: explore nearby space, research new technologies, harvest resources, develop a space fleet and eventually conquer and reunify with Earth, leading to the greatest reunion the universe has ever set its eyes on.

== Reception ==
Reception

Review score
Publication	Score
Computer Gaming World	2/5

Magazine Amiga Joker reviewed it and gave 85 points out of 100 for the OCS version and 86 out of 100 for the AGA version.
Magazine GURU reviewed it and gave 92 points out of 100.
Magazine PC Joker reviewed it and gave 85 points out of 100.
