= Afrika Korps (disambiguation) =

Afrika Korps was the German expeditionary force in Africa during World War II.

Afrika Korps may also refer to:

- Afrika Korps (game), a 1964 Avalon Hill board game
- Desert Rats vs. Afrika Korps, a 2004 real-time tactics video game

== See also ==
- Wagner Group, a Russian state-sponsored private military company rebranding as Afrika Corps in 2023
