= Dead Block =

2011 video game

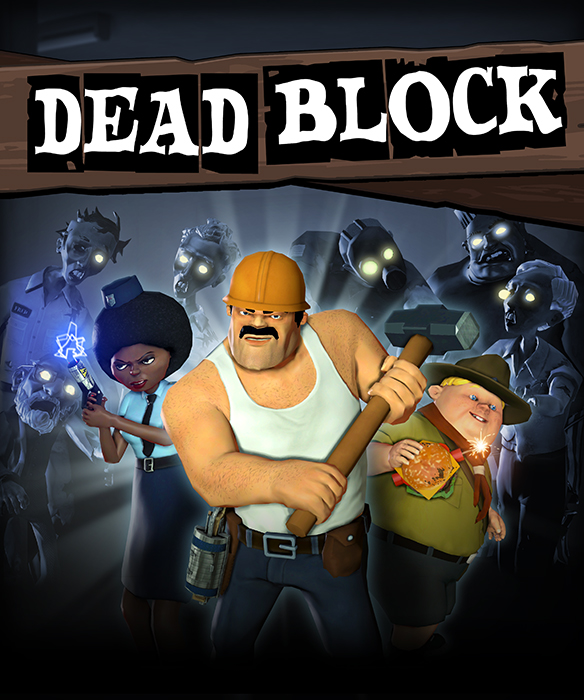
- Developer: Candygun Games
- Publisher: Digital Reality
- Engine: Unreal Engine 3
- Platforms: Xbox 360, PlayStation 3, Microsoft Windows
- Release: Xbox 360; July 6, 2011; PlayStation 3: NA: July 20, 2011; PAL: July 27, 2011; Windows; January 26, 2012
- Genres: Action, strategy
- Modes: Single-player, multiplayer

Dead Block is a third-person action-strategy video game by German developer Candygun Games and publisher Digital Reality, in which three survivors of a zombie outbreak attempt to keep zombies out of a safehouse. It was released on the Xbox 360 on July 6, 2011 via Xbox Live Arcade, and on the PlayStation 3 via the PlayStation Network on July 20, 2011 in North America and July 27, 2011 in the PAL region. A Microsoft Windows release followed on January 26, 2012.

In the game, three characters use a combination of blockades, traps and weapons to fight off attacking zombies. It was developed with the Unreal 3 Engine. While critics gave the game high marks for its music and comedic premise, they expressed disappointment in the lack of online multiplayer.

== Synopsis and gameplay ==
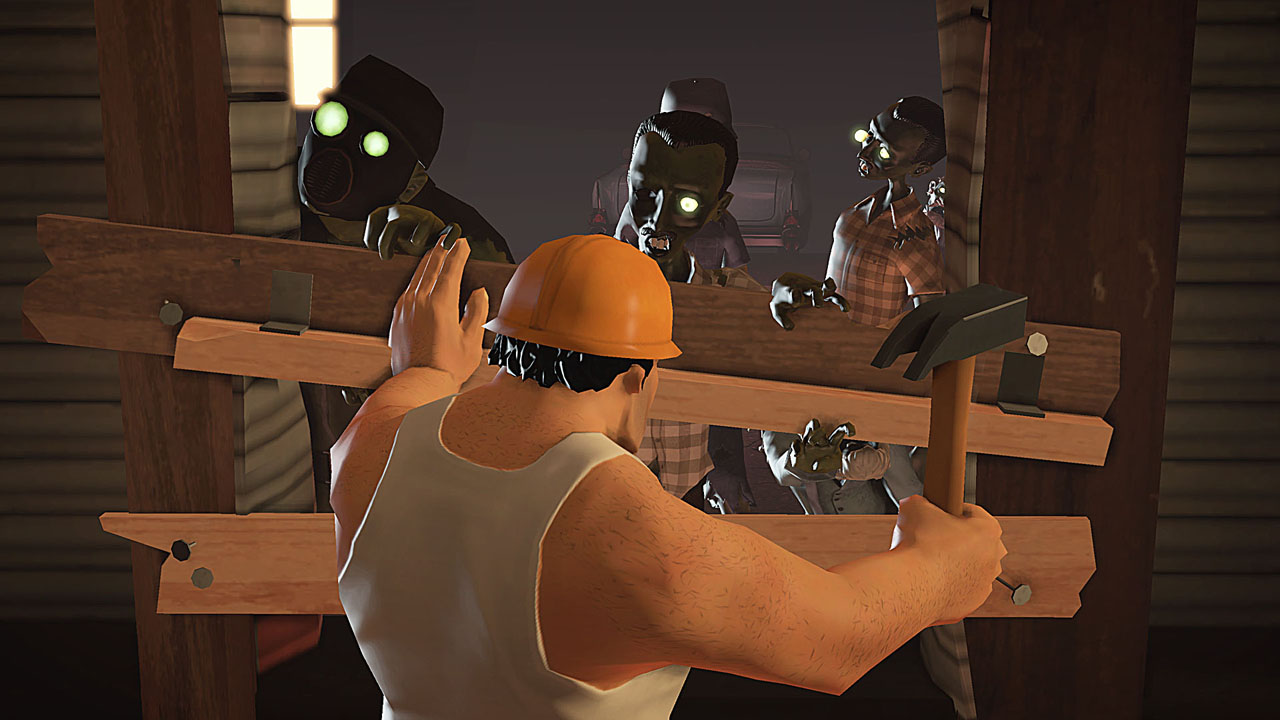
In Dead Block, players must fortify a safehouse from a zombie horde using tower defense-like mechanics. Above, Jack Foster constructs a wood blockade to prevent the undead from entering

Dead Block is set during the 1950s where a zombie outbreak coincides with the emergence of the rock and roll genre of music during that time period. The three playable characters are Jack Foster, a tall and slovenly dressed construction worker, Mike Bacon, a courageous boyscout, and Foxy Jones, an armed city traffic warden in uniform.

The game is primarily a variant on the tower defense game mechanic. Players must build traps and fortify doors and windows to keep a horde of zombies from entering a given building. During gameplay players can also scavenge the building for additional powerups, items and things that can assist in keeping the zombies at bay. The game can be played locally with four players in a splitscreen format, and includes ten single player levels along with an additional eight multiplayer co-op levels.

== Development and release ==
Dead Block was first announced on May 5, 2011. It is powered by Epic Games' Unreal Engine 3. It was released July 6, 2011 for the Xbox 360 via Xbox Live Arcade, and on July 20, 2011 in North America and July 27, 2011 in the PAL region for the PlayStation 3 via the PlayStation Network. A release for Microsoft Windows followed on January 26, 2012. A downloadable content pack entitled the More Dead to Block Map Pack was released on August 17, 2011. It features four new locations including a Motel, a Turkish Bath, an Office Building, and a Slaughterhouse.

Andreas Hackel, art director at Candygun Games described the inspiration for the game's visuals. "I was inspired by games like Team Fortress 2 and classic B-movies of the 1950s", stated Hackel. When asked about the reason for choosing to set it in the 1950s, Hackel replied, "not many games are set in this period and there are a whole slew of very typical and interesting design elements from this time period. Elements like the cars, milk bars, chrome, juke boxes, fashion and hairstyles are all instantly recognisable as coming from the 50s." Hackel commented that Candygun wanted the characters to be "people from the street", and not superheroes. Roger Joswig explained their choice of using Unreal Engine 3 instead of a proprietary technology. "If you're looking to release your game on [PlayStation 3], Xbox 360 and PC as we were, developing your own engine is a lot more expensive, takes a long time if you start from scratch and needs a lot of QA support – so it wasn't really a feasible option for us as a small, start-up developer". He also noted that the engine is built to run on the PlayStation 3, Xbox 360 and Microsoft Windows natively and that the team was familiar with the Unreal Engine tools. The in-game music was provided by the band Vampyre State Building. The narrator's voice and in-game sound effects were outsourced to Periscope Studios.

== Reception ==
Reception

Aggregate score
Aggregator	Score
Metacritic	(PS3) 63/100 (PC) 55/100 (X360) 50/100

Review scores
Publication	Score
4Players	(PS3) 56% (X360) 55%
Destructoid	(X360) 4.5/10
Eurogamer	(X360) 4/10
GamePro	3.5/5
GameSpot	4.5/10
Giant Bomb	(X360) 2/5
IGN	(X360) 3.5/10
Jeuxvideo.com	14/20
PlayStation Official Magazine – UK	(PS3) 7/10
Official Xbox Magazine (US)	(X360) 8/10
411Mania	(X360) 6/10

The game received "mixed" reviews on all platforms according to the review aggregation website Metacritic, which reported a wide range in scores for the Xbox 360 version, with the lowest score of a 20% approval given by Nick Hartel of Video Game Talk to an 83% approval from ZT Game Domain's Michael Futter.

Critics were divided in their opinions on Dead Block's gameplay mechanics. Arthur Gies of IGN called the controls "clumsy [and] clunky". He criticized the process of breaking down items in a safehouse for scrap. He felt that the process was too long and boring, and that it slowed the pace of the game. Kristan Reed of Eurogamer concurred. He felt that the melee combat was also "flimsy". However Neile Johnson of Official Xbox Magazine felt differently. Johnson stated that the game had "manic pacing" and that its "campy madness only gets better in split-screen co-op". Johnson pointed out that the game "put a fresh face on the shop-worn corpse-killer" with its tower defense gameplay. RipTen's Chris Carlson praised the game's "awesome selection of tools and weapons" and overall replay value. Chris Watters of GameSpot also gave high marks for the game's high selection of traps, but also expressed that the game can get repetitive at times. While some reviewers lauded the splitscreen multiplayer, some also expressed disappointment in the lack of any online play.

The game's setting and presentation also received mixed opinions from critics. Reed felt that the 1950s B-movie vibe was a bit overdone, and could have used "just a smidgen more subtlety". Gies agreed. He felt that the game "makes a good initial impression" but that it did not have enough substance. Watters felt that "the campy B-movie vibe and cartoon aesthetic aren't good enough to add much appeal". Again Johnson disagreed and cited the game's "rockabilly music [and] amusing characters" as high points. Carlson also felt that Dead Block had "some great music".

As of 2011, the Xbox 360 version has sold 35,625 units. A sales analysis of PlayStation Network titles sold in August 2011 showed that Dead Block moved 7,778 units in the first month of its release on the service.
