= Bang Bang Racing =

2011 video game

- Bang Bang Racing THD title card
- Developers: Playbox, Digital Reality
- Publisher: Digital Reality
- Platforms: Android, Microsoft Windows, PlayStation 3 (PSN), Xbox 360 (XBLA)
- Release: Android; May 13, 2011; PlayStation 3 (PSN): NA: June 5, 2012; PAL: June 13, 2012; Xbox 360 (XBLA); June 6, 2012; Windows; June 8, 2012
- Genre: Racing
- Modes: Single-player, multiplayer

Bang Bang Racing is a racing video game co-developed by Playbox and Digital Reality and published by Digital Reality. It was first released as Bang Bang Racing THD for Android-based devices on May 13, 2011. It was released in June 2012 for Microsoft Windows, PlayStation 3 via the PlayStation Network and Xbox 360 via Xbox Live Arcade. It received mixed reviews from critics. Some found that the game's focus on racing and omitting Mario Kart style weaponry allowed it simplistic fun, yet some were critical of its local-only multiplayer. As of June 2018 it is no longer available on the Google Play Store.

== Gameplay ==
Bang Bang Racing is a top-down racing title in the vein of older titles of the same genre such as R.C. Pro-Am, Super Off Road and Super Sprint.

Bang Bang Racing is a racing video game played from a top-down perspective. The game's sole objective is to finish before all other racers. It features a compacted art style similar to older top-down racing games such as R.C. Pro-Am, Super Off Road and Super Sprint. In addition to single player races four player splitscreen gameplay is offered and scores can be tracked via online leaderboards. Courses, cars and liveries are unlocked in the single player portion of the game, and these unlocks carry over to the local multiplayer.

The game features four different race car classes, each with unique attributes: N-Dura, Evo GT, Protech and Apex. Within each class five different cars are offered for a total of 20 cars. Each car also features eight different paint liveries. Nine courses are available, and each can be played in a reverse layout. Additionally each course has multiple shortcut layouts, resulting in a total of 54 unique configurations.

== Development and marketing ==
Bang Bang Racing was first announced for Tegra 2-powered Android devices in 2011. It released as Bang Bang Racing THD (Tegra HD) on May 13, 2011. Leaked footage from an Xbox 360 development machine appeared on YouTube in November 2011. The footage also leaked information on Saint's Row: Money Shot and Quarrel. This footage coincided with information about an October 27, 2011 classification by the Australian Classification Board. An official debut trailer was released on November 28, 2011 and it was confirmed the same day that the game would be coming to Microsoft Windows, PlayStation 3 via the PlayStation Network, and Xbox 360 via Xbox Live Arcade.

András Timár-Geng, Lead Designer at Digital Reality explained that the game is focused on family-friendly racing. "[The] top-down view fits perfectly to the friendly cars and environment", stated Timár-Geng and added that the top-down perspective distances it from other digital racing titles. The team decided that instead of creating a combat-racing game similar to the Mario Kart series that they would instead focus on keeping gameplay simple as possible "in order to honor the great old top-down racers."

== Reception ==
Reception

Aggregate score
Aggregator	Score
Metacritic	(PC) 60/100 (X360) 58/100 (PS3) 56/100

Review scores
Publication	Score
4Players	50%
GamesMaster	(X360) 45%
Gamezebo	(PC) 4/5
Jeuxvideo.com	15/20
PlayStation Official Magazine – UK	(PS3) 4/10
Official Xbox Magazine (UK)	(X360) 5/10
Official Xbox Magazine (US)	(X360) 6/10
Pocket Gamer	(AND) 3/5

The game received "mixed" reviews on all platforms according to the review aggregation website Metacritic.

PlayStation Official Magazine – UK felt that the PlayStation 3 version wasn't a "bad game, merely a game with no purpose." Cameron Lewis of Official Xbox Magazine felt that the omission of weaponry allowed the game to appeal to fans of older arcade racing games such as Super Sprint. He praised the addition of local multiplayer, but questioned the lack of online play. Lewis noted that the tracks were attractive and fun to drive, yet kept a difficulty level that made them difficult to master. Gamezebo's Mike Rose also praised the racing mechanics, including solid track design and strong AI opponents, but lamented the lack of online multiplayer.

The Android version of the game received slightly better reviews. Will Wilson of Pocket Gamer cited solid racing mechanics, but noted that the game suffered from slowdown on certain devices. He also expressed disappointment in the lack of multiplayer.
