= D-Day (2004 video game) =

- Developer(s): Digital Reality
- Publisher(s): O3 Entertainment
- Platform(s): Microsoft Windows
- Release: 2004
- Genre(s): Real-time tactics

D-Day is a real-time tactics game, that is set during and after the Normandy D-Day landings in 1944. The game features fully rendered 3D viewable from different angles. The player can take control of up to 60 different units, from snipers, to flamethrower units, and can take control of wheeled and tracked units. It is considered a sequel to Desert Rats vs. Afrika Korps, which uses the same control system and engine, along with Monte Cristo's 1944: Battle of the Bulge.

The game features single player campaign modes, and a multiplayer mode, consisting of 8 players.

The game was released to coincide with the 60th anniversary of the actual Normandy landings in June 1944.

== Overview ==
The game features many different angles of the invasion, from the assault on Pegasus Bridge to the landing on Omaha Beach. D-Day features many different types of vehicles and tactical aid, such as paratroopers, artillery strikes and bombing runs, as well as many infantry types, such as medics and riflemen equipped with flamethrowers, and anti-tank weapons.

== Development ==
In June 2004, O~3 Entertainment announced a deal with Monte Cristo Games to publish D-Day in North and South America. The game was released in North America on December 7, 2004.

== Reception ==
The game has received mixed reviews and has a Metacritic score of 56/100 based on 19 reviews.
