= Haegemonia: Legions of Iron =

2002 video game

Haegemonia – Legions of Iron
- Developers: Digital Reality; Microïds (OS X, iOS, Droid)
- Publishers: NA: DreamCatcher Interactive; EU: Wanadoo Edition; Microïds (OS X, iOS, Droid)
- Platforms: Microsoft Windows, OS X, iOS, Android
- Release: Windows: NA: November 12, 2002; EU: November 22, 2002; OS X: WW: November 15, 2013; iOS, Android: WW: October 14, 2014
- Genre: Real-time strategy
- Modes: Single-player, multiplayer

Haegemonia: Legions of Iron, or Hegemonia: Legions of Iron (Hungarian: Haegemonia: Az Univerzum Légiói), is a 3D real-time strategy game developed by Digital Reality for Microsoft Windows, and by Microïds for OS X, iOS, and Android.

== Storyline ==
Haegemonia takes place in the distant future where humanity has colonized the Solar System and tensions are high between the World Government of Earth and colonial Mars. A summit on Earth's Moon is planned to ease tensions, but the Martian representative's shuttle is destroyed en route by a third, currently unknown, party. The two sides blame each other and this one event sparks off the civil war between the colonists and Earth.

The player can side with Captain Jack Garner of Earth to quell the colonial uprising, or join Captain Nilea Cortilliari and the Martian colonists on their campaign for independence.

=== Earth campaign ===
The Earth Campaign of Haegemonia is treated more like a basic training campaign. It teaches the players the basic interface of gameplay and then thrusts them into battle. The first Act the player has to escort a research vessel to the sun. As the players progress through the missions they learn more about how to play the game, gain new units and the ability to build them. The campaign then enters the "high" point of the Earth-Mars War. During the last part of the act, they have to prepare for the final assault on Mars. On the last mission, the player is thrust into a tough final battle with Mars, regardless of whether the player is ready or not. Winning the battle will always result in the same situation, a unified Solar System and the forming of the Legions of Iron. After this the acts between Earth and Mars are almost exactly the same.

=== Mars campaign ===
The Mars campaign begins with intercepting trade ships which are supplying Earth's installations. Following this mission are some other missions which contain fights on the outer regions of Sol, between colonies of Mars and Earth. At the end of this episode, the players have to attack Earth, by destroying all units around Earth. These consist of some fighter squads and two (indestructible) military bases. First off, the players kill the fighter squads, then HQ comes in play and sends two kamikaze ships at the military bases. These must be protected by putting the forces between the line of fire from the military bases and the kamikaze ships.

=== Legions of Iron ===
Once the outcome of the war is decided, be it Earth or Mars, humanity unites under the new Unified Government and forms the Legions of Iron, its vanguard of expansion into the unknown, commanded by the player.

As the human race expands outward from Sol, mysteries are solved and new ones are created as they encounter new worlds and alien civilizations. The humans encounter a race called the Kariak and become embroiled in a war with them. The player discovers that the Kariak are being manipulated into fighting with humanity by another species named the Darzok. The Kariak then ally with humanity and they jointly defeat the Darzok, foiling their plan to annihilate both races.

== Gameplay ==
Haegemonia allows the player to create a multi-system empire. At first, only the planets similar to Earth can be colonized. After advanced terraforming and colonization techniques are researched or stolen from enemies, almost any planet can be colonized and, eventually, terraformed into Gaia-class worlds (gas giants are uninhabitable).

There are several ways of getting money to fund planetary projects and space construction: tax colonies, steal money from enemies with spies, mine resource-rich asteroids, receive tribute from other races/factions, and other ways (e.g. aid from Earth).

Research system is based on research points (RPs) which are allocated at the beginning of each mission. Most of the time, that is the maximum for the mission; however, certain random events may also increase that amount. During the campaign, all researched technologies are transferred from mission to mission, and the player can choose a certain number of ships and heroes to bring along to the next mission.

The espionage system is also different from many other games. Spy ships can be constructed in the same manner as other ships, usually no more than 3 may be present at a time. Certain heroes excel at spying and are best placed in those ships. These ships are invisible on sensors and have no sensors of their own (to prevent unfair use as scouts). Instead, spy ships can be assigned mission to be performed on planets, ships, or stations. The higher the level of the spy ship and/or hero is, the more types of missions they may perform (they gain levels by spying). In some cases, a well-trained spy ship may be worth several battleships. Spies can also be used to detect and stop enemy spies. If a spy ship is detected (e.g. spy mission failure, detected by another spy), it becomes visible for a short time to all ships, allowing it to be attacked. Ship behaviors and spy missions can be set using right-click menus. The same is true for subsystem targeting, although it is limited to hull, engines, and weapons.

Energy weapons are split up into three groups: cannons (fighters only), turrets (anti-fighter, used on turret corvettes and heavy ships), and blasters (only energy weapon for orbital bombardment, used on blaster corvettes and heavy ships). Weaponry also comes in four distinct forms:

- Proton: orange, ball-shaped projectile, primarily used by human ships. Proton weapons are fairly accurate and fast-hitting. They have the ability to penetrate shields.
- Ion: blue-white beam, reminiscent of the Ion Cannons from Homeworld. Ion weapons are mainly used on Kariak ships; they are instant-hitting and have a chance to temporarily disable shields.
- Quantum: grey-purple cloud. These weapons are slow, compared to proton projectiles, however they have high, area-of-effect damage. Used by Darzoks.
- Missile: the highest damaging weapons. They are very effective against slow targets and are the ultimate planetary bombardment weapons, possessing a very high kill-off. To counter this, they are ineffective against fighters and very vulnerable to ECM: fully researched, MK-2 ECM systems will cause up to 90% of incoming missiles to veer off-course, though more advanced warheads can resist ECM to some extent.

== Music ==
The music was composed by Ervin Nagy and Tamas Kreiner.

== Reception ==
Hegemonia: Legions of Iron

Aggregate score
Aggregator	Score
Metacritic	75/100

Review scores
Publication	Score
Computer Gaming World	2.5/5
GameSpot	7.9/10
GameSpy	3.5/5
GameZone	8.9/10
IGN	8.2/10
PC Gamer (US)	77%
PC Zone	82%

Legions of Iron received "generally favorable reviews" according to the review aggregation website Metacritic.

== Expansion ==
Haegemonia – The Solon Heritage
- Developer: Digital Reality
- Publishers: EU: Wanadoo; NA: Meridian4
- Platform: Microsoft Windows
- Release: EU: October 31, 2003; NA: May 1, 2014 (Steam)
- Genre: Real-time strategy
- Modes: Single-player, multiplayer

Due to the success of the game, Digital Reality produced an add-on package, The Solon Heritage (Hungarian: Haegemonia: A Solon hagyaték), which added a few new features, such as a proper skirmish mode, and modding tools. After the destruction of the Armada, a mysterious artifact of Solon origin was discovered, leading to technological advancements and intense military buildup. Because of contract issues (mainly of Wanadoo being sold), The Solon Heritage was not published in the USA.

Several changes are presented compared to the original game:

- New game modes: Informant, where one side mainly has spies, while the other military units; Mess-up, where the wormholes move around randomly; and Drill, where the only source of income is mining.
- New ships for all races: diplomatic ships which ferry RPs, money, research, etc. and residential bases which generate additional income. In addition, all races can build Solon ships which has superior firepower, armor, accuracy and firing range, offset by their insanely high upkeep (for example, a cruiser-class Solon Leech costs as much as five Cruisers) and unique vulnerability: destroying the communication center required for building these ships results in all Solon units owned by that player detonating.
- New race-specific units:
  - Human: dropships wreak major havoc on planets and self-destructing satellites surprising the enemy.
  - Kariak: disintegrator satellites weaken enemy ships while virus ships convert/destroy them.
  - Darzok: kamikaze ships and special satellites whose detection range span through an entire system.
- Heavily modified units: weaponry of non-fighter military ships have been standardized (corvettes have a single blaster, cruisers have 2 turrets and a blaster while battleships have 3 blasters and one turret), with the result of fighters being more effective (they are smaller and more numerous per group (11)).
- New spy missions like epidemic, radar sabotage, ecological disaster (reverse terraforming), etc.
- Over 70 new inventions with several old ones modified. Research can now be done from a nine-item list where each invention is done after the previous one finishes with no manual input required.
- Deployable ships can be moved and redeployed at will. The Starmap can be rotated. New planetary defense structures are available.
- Improved AI: trade ships no longer visit enemies' planets because they are no longer ignored by military units. AI players are unpredictable, using every unit to gain the upper hand.
