= War Front: Turning Point =

2007 video game

- Developer: Digital Reality
- Publishers: CDV; Atari (Europe)
- Platform: Microsoft Windows
- Release: NA: 23 February 2007; AU: 19 March 2007; EU: 23 March 2007
- Genre: Real-time strategy
- Modes: Single-player, multiplayer

War Front: Turning Point is a real-time strategy video game set in an alternate World War II. It was developed by Hungarian studio Digital Reality, and published by CDV and released in 2007 for Microsoft Windows.

The game is set in a fictional, alternate World War II in which Adolf Hitler is assassinated in the early days of the war, and under the new chancellor, Germany occupies Great Britain. Eventually, Nazi Germany is defeated, but this allows the Soviet Union to advance into Western Europe. The game features both real life and fictional "experimental" war machines and units.

== Gameplay ==
War Front: Turning Point is a real-time strategy game featuring units going from World War II weaponry such as Messerschmitt Me 262 fighter aircraft and M4 Sherman and T-34 tanks, to real-life units that were not present during that war such as Northrop YB-49 jet bomber, to entirely science fictional units like Exoskeleton mechs, freeze rays and shield generators, while all can build a "Bridging" tank unit capable of building bridges over bodies of water. Each faction can also build three heroes: individual characters with unique abilities, both passive and active to benefit the player's own units and act against the foe's units. The longer heroes and units remain on the battlefield, destroying units and buildings in the process, the more they can rank up, increasing their abilities, yet lose them if they are killed and re-built. The player can also use aerial support such as calling in paratrooper reinforcements, scouting runs and bomb strikes.

War Front: Turning Point however has an unconventional RTS feature, being the abilities to manually control pill boxes and turrets to fire upon enemies, like that of a first-person shooter. The camera can also be ordered to follow other units in a third-person perspective, where orders can still be given, but the units not be directly controlled like the turrets.

Along with the time of day changing dynamically in each game, random weather can affect effectiveness of units and interference. Storms, for example, can damage airplanes, and radars (mini-map view) can become distorted or even temporarily knocked out.

=== Online play ===
War Front: Turning Point includes online play through GameRanger. Custom games can have up to ten players playing in one online game.

== Factions ==
=== Allies ===
Like the real World War II Western Allies, they are a coalition of the United States, United Kingdom, and Free France. Because of this, their units are a mixture of each side, such as the British Matilda tank and American M26 Pershing. They have a technological advantage over the other factions, because their buildings are able to power themselves, without the need for power plants. They also have a superior air force that is larger, stronger and more versatile. These include aircraft such as the P-38 Lightning bomber (the only bomber capable of defending itself against interceptors) P-51 Mustang fighters and attack helicopters. The Allies also have the atomic bomb at their disposal, deployed by a Northrop YB-35 and an "earthquake bomb" via a Halifax bomber. The Allied experimental unit is the O.R.B. (Omni-Repulsor-Barrier), which is an APC truck with a force-field generator on the back, capable of protecting units, within its deflector shield range, from low to medium attacks.

=== Germany ===
The German forces are that of the real-life Wehrmacht, but under new, more effective leadership following the death of Adolf Hitler in the early stages of the war. Their army focuses more on firepower, with a wide range of ground armoured units. German tanks are particularly strong that include real-life and upgraded versions such as the Panzer VIII Maus, Elefant "tank hunter" and Tiger tank. They use Me 262 fighter aircraft and Junkers Ju 390s and Horten Ho 229s for bombing runs, with the ability to deploy V-1 flying bombs, which can be upgraded to a V-2 rocket. The Germans also have more varied experimental units than the other two factions. These include jet pack infantry equipped with flame throwers, heavy exoskeleton mech-like heavy infantry, Sonic tanks that use blasts of sonic waves (rather than conventional ammunition) and the Giant Zeppelin, which uses an aluminium structure and large air-to-ground cannons.

=== Soviet Union ===
The Soviet Union is less developed than the Allies and Germans; however, it uses sheer numbers to overwhelm its opposition. It has an expanded and more-effective selection of infantry. Along with the general Red Army infantry, the Soviets have Medics to heal nearby infantry, Commissars to boost morale (overall efficiency), Molotov infantry that uses Molotov cocktails rather than rockets, being a faster option and can be backed up by Vodka Dealers who can make nearby infantry invulnerable to damage while they're alive. Their heavy armour is also small yet does include some powerful machines, like the Kharkov Rampager that is slow yet equipped with multiple turrets. Their aircraft is both smaller and weaker, primarily using Tupolev TB-3 bombers, Il-2 Shturmovik ground-attack aircraft and Yakovlev Yak-1 interceptors. They do however have powerful experimental units like the Ice Spitter, capable of freezing other units along with a similar "freeze bomb" deployed by a Tupolev bomber. There is also the Giant Moving Turret that is slow with limited turret movement, but it has a long range and is very powerful. The APC Mole can transport troops by tunnelling underground.

== Campaign ==
=== Premise ===
War Front: Turning Point is set in an alternate universe in which Adolf Hitler is killed in the early days of the war. A new chancellor comes to power, and under his rule, Operation Sea Lion succeeds, and Germany successfully conquers Great Britain. As a result, Germany, the Western Allies and the Soviet Union enter a technological cold war, resulting in various new advanced technologies on both sides.

=== German Campaign ===
The campaign opens 1000 days after the German invasion of Great Britain, where Oberstleutnant Roland Hellmann, under General Hardt, takes control of London. While pushing back Allied resistance north, Hardt is revealed to be working with the German Resistance, an undercover wing of the Wehrmacht under Dietrich Preiss; however, Hellmann is uninterested in their means of conduct. He is then sent to rescue Elsa Adler, a female German spy behind Soviet lines of the Eastern Front. There it is revealed that the Soviets are using weapons to cool the environment to their advantage, with Adler being pursued by Aleksei Mikhalkov of the Red Army. Upon Adler's rescue, she reveals Soviet plans to build a range of new super-weapons and conquer Germany. To prevent this, they join up entirely with Preiss' resistance, and with the help of American Colonel John Lynch, they press on to take out the current Nazi leaders in order to make peace and ally with Britain and the rest of the Western Allies in hope of suppressing further conflict with the Soviets. This operation is successful, despite Nazi attempts to even destroy Berlin in the process.

Back at Berlin, General Wells of Britain arrives to sign the peace treaty with Hardt, only to be interrupted by a surprise Soviet attack on the capital. While the Allies and Germans recover, it becomes apparent that the previous reports which Adler obtained were fabricated by the Soviets themselves so the German Resistance would kill the chancellor, thus bringing Germany into civil war, while the Soviets benefit and conquer all of Eastern Europe. The Soviets are held off momentarily, in order for Hellmann to locate and secure a top-secret German weapons base that houses plans for experimental weapons. During another push against the Soviets, Preiss is captured, and he is used to lure both the Germans and Allies into a trap, and is eventually rescued.

As Hardt and Hellmann begin the assault on Moscow, Mikhalkov, disguised as a German exoskeleton troop, kidnaps Adler via a false transmission. Hardt order the final strike against the Kremlin itself, but he stops just as the last remaining Soviets raise the white flag of surrender. Meanwhile, Hellmann confronts Mikhalkov, firing on a transmission tower allowing it to destroy Mikhalkov's suit. Instead of defeat, Mikhalkov instead causes the remains to self-destruct, yet Hellmann evades in time. Hardt and Lynch give their victory speeches, and the final scene closes with Adler and Hellmann kissing.

=== Allied Campaign ===
The campaign opens 1000 days into the German occupation of London, and 999 days into the continued British resistance against the occupation. General Wells of the British Army entrusts Colonel Lynch of the American Army to push the Germans out and they succeed. However, an Allied Intelligence base is attacked by an elite group of the Wehrmacht in which Lynch is sent to eliminate and reclaim the base. Lynch however discovers that the elite enemy group consists of members of the Soviet Red Army and is led by an apparent Russian defector, Nadia Amanova. Along the way, Lynch reunites with an old friend, Vincent Sagnier of the French Resistance. Lynch is then partnered with British double agent Anna Herzog in a mission to save German resistance leader General Wolfgang Hardt. After saving Hardt, Lynch meets Roland Hellmann and they realised that the Russians are behind raids on top-secret facilities and factories from both the Allies and the Germans. Unsure what the Soviets are planning, they agree that taking out the Nazi leadership to ensure peace between Germany and the Allies could happen in case the Soviets planned something. The operation succeeds and Lynch is sent to Italy to route out the last Nazi stronghold in Southern Europe. The operation succeeds but only with the surprise aid of Soviet Red Army Colonel Nazarov who assists Lynch in hopes of finding the traitor Nadia at the stronghold.

While peace talks occur in Berlin, Lynch meets with Nazarov in regards to Nadia but is betrayed as it is revealed that Nadia never turned defector and the Soviet Union played both sides. Lynch and Sagnier survive Nazarov's trap and eliminate the Red Army colonel to learn of the Soviet attempt in Berlin. With the two factions joined in cause, the Allies and the Germans invade Soviet-controlled territories and encountered fearsome experimental super weapons. Lynch encounters Nadia a second time and discovers that she suffers from an eye injury, forcing her to wear specialised goggles. While the Allied/German forces hold off the Soviet Red Army, Lynch is tasked with rescuing captured scientists from a secret Russian facility which allows the Allies to learn of the Freeze Bomb. Fortunately, the Allies have the O.R.B. (Omni-Repulsor-Barrier) ready for deployment. As the allied forces continue to close in on Moscow, news of the American atomic bomb tests reaches their ears. Unfortunately, during the repelling of a Soviet counter-attack, General Wells is assassinated by Nadia, causing a drop in morale. Lynch takes it personally.

As Hardt launches the assault on Moscow, Lynch's forces takes out the remaining Russian defences, causing the Kremlin to surrender as Hardt's forces reach the Kremlin walls. Lynch finds Nadia again and chases her into the Kremlin and takes her out with a specialised flash-bang grenade resulting in her capture. After Lynch and Hardt give their victory speeches, the scene closes with Lynch rejoining Anna and the two kiss as Sagnier jokingly comments on the two to get a room.

== Reception ==
Reception

Aggregate score
Aggregator	Score
Metacritic	73/100

Review scores
Publication	Score
1Up.com	C
Eurogamer	7/10
GamePro	3.5/5
GameSpot	7.5/10
GameSpy	3/5
GameZone	7.5/10
IGN	7.8/10
Maximum PC	7/10
PC Gamer (US)	77%
X-Play	4/5

The game received "average" reviews according to the review aggregation website Metacritic. X-Play found that the "alternate history stuff keeps the stale setting interesting without getting completely wacky", while GameSpot commented on the balance of real-life and fictional units, being a "good thing because battles remain grounded in real-world combat and don't go overboard with high-tech gadgetry", going on to say: "Digital Reality strikes an almost perfect balance here between real history and 'what if?' ruminations".

Many reviewers however felt the RTS gameplay was still too conventional, regardless of the subject matter. IGN found that, "while War Front isn’t anything particularly new, it does traditional very solidly and creates a decent action atmosphere". PC Gamer similarly agreed by concluding: "War Front is a solid and entertaining game, though far less original than it purports to be". Because of the game's traditional RTS formula, Eurogamer reviewed the title while at the same time satires reviews in general by outlining the traditional conventions in most reviews, such as concluding: "Lazy conclusion? Wrap things up with a witty line that leaves readers grinning. Or, just stop writing in the middl..."

GameSpy criticised the first-person shooter aspect for being "useless in a game that moves so fast" and even "may also cause lesser computers to slow to a crawl". Graphically, GameSpot felt: "The dark, gritty look of the game makes most levels a treat for the eyes when you're simply gawking at the scenery" yet at times can be "so dark and dense with detail that units are obscured".
