= Battlestations: Midway =

2007 video game

- Developer: Eidos Hungary
- Publishers: Eidos Interactive; Feral Interactive (Mac OS X)
- Designers: Györei Viktor; Szalasci Botond
- Programmer: Somfai Ákos
- Artist: Nagy Zoltán
- Composer: Richard Jacques
- Series: Battlestations
- Platforms: Xbox 360, Microsoft Windows, Mac OS X
- Release: NA: January 30, 2007; EU: February 9, 2007; AU: February 16, 2007; Macintosh; July 28, 2008
- Genres: Action, real-time tactics
- Modes: Single-player, multiplayer

Battlestations: Midway is a video game developed by Eidos Hungary and released in 2007 for the Xbox 360 and Microsoft Windows. The Mac version of this game was developed by Robosoft Technologies, based out of India and published in July 2008 by Feral Interactive.

Set in the Pacific during World War II, it is a hybrid of action and real-time tactics as the player can both command their fleet assets and assume control of any one of them at will. The single-player campaign is a series of missions from Pearl Harbor commanding an Elco PT Boat to the Battle of Midway commanding an entire carrier battle group.

The game can be purchased from the Xbox digital store and played on Xbox One and Xbox Series consoles thanks to the Xbox backwards compatibility program.

== Gameplay ==
In either the single-player or multiplayer game the player starts with a ship, submarine, aircraft, shipyard, airfield or a combination of any of them. The player can switch between their allocated units in order to complete objectives. Each unit also has its own unique features and controls. For example, using a carrier, shipyard or airfield, players can release carrier aircraft, ships, or land-based aircraft respectively. These units can then be used to engage in naval battles, undersea actions or dogfights and bombing runs.

Players are encouraged to work together online. In multiplayer, each player controls a different group of units. Each player has different units allocated to them, each with unique strengths and weaknesses. Each side will have a specific objective to complete, whether it being to destroy or protect a certain unit or reach a certain point on the map. The team wins when they are the first to complete their objective(s).

=== Single-player ===
The single-player campaign contains 11 historically based missions from the American perspective and is played through the eyes of Henry Walker, an aspiring young man trying to follow in his father's footsteps of being a great Navy Admiral, and his best friend Donald Locklear, an ace in the Flying Tigers.

Battlestations: Midway offers several challenge levels where the player's skills are tested.

The game has appearances by John F. Kennedy, commanding Motor Torpedo Boat PT-109, and Franklin D. Roosevelt.

=== Multiplayer ===
Battlestations: Midway supports multiplayer matches of up to eight players. Matches are team-based, beginning with each player choosing either an Allied or a Japanese starting base from a list of preset slots in the lobby. Each slot has its own unique unit or building allocation. A slot can have up to four units. Each multiplayer map is essentially a "set-piece" battle whereby all of the units on the map at the beginning of the match are the only units available to the players for the entire match. The two exceptions to this are units that can be spawned (e.g. aircraft from airfields, aircraft carriers, etc.) and the planes that respawn in the map "Air Superiority at Luzon", which is very infrequently played.

Since December 2012 GameSpy closed down all their support for Battlestations: Midway. Players trying to play the Multiplayer (powered by GameSpy) are getting only error messages.

== Development ==
The game entered development in around March 2002 for Microsoft Windows under the Midway: Naval Battles title for a late 2003 to early 2004 release. After SCi Games acquired the game's publishing rights, the game was rebranded as Battlestations: Midway, and Gizmondo, PlayStation 2, and Xbox versions were commissioned. These versions were later cancelled in favour of an Xbox 360 release.

=== Demo ===
A multiplayer demo was released on the Xbox Live Marketplace on January 18, 2007. The PC demo was followed shortly on January 26 and the Mac OS X demo released on July 24, 2008. The demos contained the multiplayer map Battle of Solomon Islands, which supported up to 8 players. The PC demo worked only for LAN play. Players could disconnect frequently when attempting to play via the internet. The Xbox 360 demo functioned correctly via Xbox Live online play at the time.

=== Downloadable content ===
Eidos released the "Iowa Mission Pack" on the Xbox Live Marketplace on March 28, 2003. This update included several new ship models, as well as the "Raid on Truk" ship challenge and the "Battle of Sibuyan Sea" multiplayer map. It is also preserved and available for the PC version via Mod DB and other place(s). A patch has been released for the PC version.

=== Re-Release on the Xbox ===
The game can be purchased from the Xbox digital store and played on Xbox One and Xbox Series consoles thanks to the Xbox backwards compatibility program.

== Reception ==
Reception

Aggregate score
Aggregator	Score		
Aggregator	Macintosh	PC	Xbox 360
Metacritic	N/A	76/100	73/100

Review scores
Publication	Score		
Publication	Macintosh	PC	Xbox 360
Edge	N/A	N/A	5/10
Electronic Gaming Monthly	N/A	N/A	6.5/10
Eurogamer	N/A	N/A	7/10
Famitsu	N/A	N/A	(360) 30/40; 27/40
Game Informer	N/A	6.5/10	6.5/10
GamePro	N/A	N/A	3.5/5
GameSpot	N/A	7.9/10	7.8/10
GameSpy	N/A	N/A	3.5/5
GameZone	N/A	8.2/10	8/10
IGN	N/A	8.5/10	(US) 8.5/10 (AU) 8.2/10
MacLife	4/5	N/A	N/A
Macworld	3/5	N/A	N/A
Official Xbox Magazine (US)	N/A	N/A	7/10
PC Gamer (US)	N/A	82%	N/A
The A.V. Club	N/A	B	B
The Sydney Morning Herald	N/A	3.5/5	3.5/5

The PC version received "generally favorable reviews", while the Xbox 360 version received "average" reviews, according to the review aggregation website Metacritic. In Japan, where the latter was ported and published by Spike on February 7, 2008, Famitsu gave it a score of one six and three sevens, while Famitsu X360 gave it a score of one seven, two eights, and one seven.

411Mania gave the Xbox 360 version nine out of ten, calling it "a must-own for hardcore strategy nuts and World War II hobbyists."

== Sequel ==
Eidos Interactive released Battlestations: Pacific for Windows and Xbox 360 in May 2009. This sequel takes place right after Battlestations: Midway and has twice as many missions as the game before. It also includes 21 new units and add the ability to command troops to fight on the islands, though the player has no control over any individual land unit. Naval mine and kamikazes have also been added. A new feature includes the ability to play as the Japanese from commanding the Pearl Harbor attack to Midway. Details have been added for a more realistic effect; for example, while submerged in a sub flora and fauna are visible, as well as a sea floor. The game also provides an alternate history timeline for the Japanese, a what-if scenario that tells the story of the IJN's victory at Midway, which later considers Pearl Harbor a threat to its already overextending conquest borderline, therefore forcing an invasion of Hawaii. It is also possible to, at the start of the attack on Pearl Harbor, "kill" the two main characters of Battlestations: Midway. If the player managed to sink Henry's PT boat, the pilot would comment: "His name was Henry. This is not his story." After shooting down Donald's more advanced plane, he would go on to comment that "Fighter ace, huh? At least you died in the air," pointing back to Donald's death on the USS Yorktown at the Battle of the Coral Sea.

== See also ==
- Cultural depictions of John F. Kennedy
