= Nexus: The Jupiter Incident =

2004 video game

- Developer: Mithis Entertainment
- Publishers: HD Interactive; THQ Nordic (Steam)
- Engine: Black Sun Engine
- Platform: Microsoft Windows
- Release: EU: November 5, 2004; NA: February 24, 2005
- Genres: Real-time tactics, Space combat simulator
- Modes: Single player, multiplayer

Nexus: The Jupiter Incident: A supply ship with destroyer escort.

Nexus: The Jupiter Incident is a science fiction themed real-time tactics computer game developed by the Hungary-based Mithis Entertainment and published by HD Interactive. The game focuses on tactics and ship management instead of resource collection and base construction.

== Gameplay and features ==
In each of the game's missions, the player is given a small number of large space ships (always less than ten, and sometimes just one or two), along with accompanying fighters and bombers. The ships are large and cumbersome, and the battles between fleets protracted, giving the game a noted cinematic feel. Nexus uses the Black Sun Engine, made specifically for the game. Based on DirectX 9, it makes extensive use of vertex and pixel shaders, a parametric particle system, and other visual effects.

== Story ==
The game is set in the 22nd century. The player is Marcus Cromwell, a famed spacecraft captain whose father, Richard Cromwell, the first spaceborn human, captained the colony ship Noah's Ark through a wormhole near Mars that was presumed destroyed when the wormhole collapsed. The game begins with Cromwell setting out on the heavy corvette named Stiletto, manufactured by the company Spacetech, for Jupiter as standing escort for a pair of freighters.

Upon arrival at a pair of Spacetech-owned space stations in orbit around Europa, Cromwell is retasked with intercepting a Kissaki Syndicate (a rival corporation to Spacetech) freighter that had been tagged for inspection, and later responding to an SOS call issued by Kissaki-owned station, fighting other corporations' ships and the station's automated defences. Inside the station was a cruiser-sized alien vessel, nicknamed the Angelwing by the Kissaki Syndicate, as well as information regarding another Kissaki station orbiting Pluto.

After a battle with a Syndicate fleet for the control of the Angelwing back at the Spacetech Europa stations, Cromwell is given command of the cruiser and ordered to investigate the secret Kissaki base. At Pluto, an artificial intelligence, named Angel, uploads herself into the Angelwing and advises Cromwell to escape from an alien, orb-like entity - later known as a Mechanoid - through a nearby wormhole, which was the exact same wormhole as the one which collapsed near Mars.

Cromwell exits the wormhole and finds a system (named Noah) populated by the colonists from Noah's Ark, who survived the wormhole collapse and started a colony. The Noah Colony fights as mercenaries for an advanced but pacifist alien race, called the Vardrags, whose technology was given to colonists, against another powerful race, the bloodthirsty, reptilian Gorgs, and a local group of renegade Vardrag elites, known as the Raptors.

After aiding successful raid against a Raptor base, Cromwell is enlisted to fight against the Gorg Empire. In fights against the Gorg, the Ghosts occasionally seem to help the Angelwing. However, all the races would soon find themselves facing their greatest threat: a virulent race of nanomachines called the Mechanoids. Nothing seems capable of stopping the Mechanoid invasion, and the Vardrag homeworld and Earth are overrun. Only an organic, insectile race, known as the energy-consuming Locusts, are immune to the Mechanoids. With technology adapted from the Locusts, Cromwell is able to rescue Earth and all the other solar systems and shut down the main control system of the Mechanoids, the Entity.

Cromwell and their crew eventually decide to eliminate the source of the mechanoids by heading to their home system, the Nexus. This system is not only home to a black hole but several other wormholes that connect to the home systems of all the other races. After a bitter struggle, they succeed, but Angel seemingly sacrifices herself to save the Angelwing and vanishes along with the Nexus.

The fate of Angel, who fought the Mechanoids, is left ambiguous, as she was not shown leaving the Entity and returning to the Angelwing. Cromwell, however, returns safely to Earth along with his crew. He arrives at Stonehenge where Angel, now in control of the Entity, visits him one last time to say farewell. She leaves, revealing to Cromwell her intention to “kill the gods” as she leaves.

=== Aliens ===
- Vardrags: one of the most advanced races in the game, their main home system is Chakaris (which was eventually evacuated after the attack of the Mechanoids on Chakaris III). They are very peaceful and have many strong allies. Their squadrons are led by the fearful Raptors. Though they do not know much of war tactics, they could gather very useful information on the enemy and could subsequently defeat them. The Catacalysm Missile is one of the deadliest creations of this alien group.
- Gorgs: the terrific and bloodthirsty and enemies of Vardrags and their allies. Though most of the clans of the Gorgs are brave, some, like the Raghara clan, execute many cowardly attacks. They do not even fear the Black Moon. The siege laser is one of the deadliest weapons of this alien group. Notable ships are Titan base and Warcry (Gorg Emperor's ship).
- Ghosts: a mysterious and mystic race. Their home system is Mist and generally perform stealth missions for the Vardrags. Their ships have the special ability of camouflage.
- Locust: insect-like creatures. Like ants or honey bees, their community is divided into warriors, workers and queen. The Energy Skeeter is their most powerful weapon.
- Mechanoids: A rogue group of AI that can create special bodies via nano machines. They are resistant to almost all forms of weapons, are powerful enough to devastate entire systems and fleets, and are the game’s main antagonists. Their base of operations is the Nexus, a star that was converted into a black hole.

== Development and Release ==
Nexus: The Jupiter Incident was developed by the Hungary-based Mithis Entertainment, intended by the publisher CDV originally as Imperium Galactica 3. After the business relationship between Mithis and CDV broke apart and also the Imperium Galactica license got lost, the game was revised as a tactical strategy game. The game was in development for more than four years.

The game was released in Europe in 2004 and in North America in 2005 for Windows distributed by Vivendi Universal Games through their Sierra Entertainment label in all territories except for France, Spain, Italy, Benelux, and Russia.

=== Sequel ===
A technical demonstration video for the sequel, Nexus: The Jupiter Incident 2, was leaked to the Internet in 2006.

On August 16, 2011 Most Wanted Entertainment announced a sequel, named Nexus 2, on the crowdfunding website GamesPlant with a funding goal of €400,000. The €104,867 pledged fell short of the €400,000 goal.

In 2012 the original Nexus was digitally re-released on GOG.com.

On September 28, 2012 a second campaign on Kickstarter was launched to fund the development of a sequel named Nexus 2: The Gods Awaken, but ultimately failed to raise the required amount, with only $161,731 of the $650,000 goal.

=== Legacy ===
Nordic Games announced that they acquired the intellectual property on September 16, 2015.

In March 2016 a patch was released for the game fixing long-standing issues, like widescreen support.

== Reception ==
Reception

Aggregate score
Aggregator	Score
Metacritic	77/100

Review scores
Publication	Score
Eurogamer	7/10
Game Informer	8.25/10
GamePro	4/5
GameSpot	8.3/10
GameSpy	3/5
GameZone	7.5/10
IGN	8.2/10
PC Gamer (US)	83%
VideoGamer.com	8/10
X-Play	2/5
The Sydney Morning Herald	3.5/5

The game received "generally favorable reviews" according to the review aggregation website Metacritic. It was praised particularly for its visual effects, but criticized for its steep learning curve, trial-and-error gameplay, and poorly designed stealth missions.

According to NPD Group, Nexus sold 11,500 copies by June 2005.
