= Battlestations: Pacific =

2009 video game

- Developer: Eidos Hungary (Note: Additional development by Eidos Shanghai. OS X version ported by Robosoft Technologies.)
- Publisher: Eidos Interactive (Note: Co-published by Warner Bros. Interactive Entertainment in North America. Mac OS X version by Feral Interactive.)
- Composers: Richard Jacques; David Kates
- Series: Battlestations
- Platforms: Xbox 360, Microsoft Windows, Mac OS X
- Release: NA: May 12, 2009; EU: May 15, 2009; AU: May 28, 2009; Mac OS X October 8, 2010
- Genres: Action, real-time tactics
- Modes: Single-player, multiplayer

Battlestations: Pacific is an action and real-time tactics video game published by Eidos Interactive and developed by Eidos Hungary. It is also the sequel to the 2007 video game Battlestations: Midway. It was released for Microsoft Windows and Xbox 360 worldwide in May 2009. The Mac OS X version of the game was developed by Robosoft Technologies and released on October 8, 2010, by Feral Interactive.

The game can be purchased from the Xbox digital store and played on Xbox One and Xbox Series consoles through the Xbox backwards compatibility program.

Square Enix Europe closed the game's developer, Eidos Hungary, in April 2010, making this the developer's final game.

== Gameplay ==
Battlestations: Pacific expands on Battlestations: Midway in several ways, adding new combat features such as more advanced submarine combat, more easily customizable planes and ordinance loads, island invasions, which have effects on the battle at hand. New weapons, planes, and ships were added, such as HVAR Rockets and experimental fighters, including the Kikka and Shinden, along with kamikaze units, such as the Ohka and Kaiten; there are also some more conventional aircraft and ship additions.

Battlestations: Pacific shifts events beyond the Battle of Midway for the American forces as they continue the war onwards to Okinawa and final victory.

The most drastic addition is that of the Japanese campaign, which tells a "what if" story in which Japan is victorious at the Battle of Midway and continues their war effort beyond that point to invade Hawaii, trade technology with Germany, and defeat the United States of America, with an ending cinematic of General Douglas MacArthur signing a peace treaty on the Yamato in San Francisco Bay, meant to echo the surrender of Japan on the deck of the USS Missouri.

It is also possible to, at the start of the attack on Pearl Harbor, "kill" the two main characters of Battlestations: Midway. If the player managed to sink Henry's PT boat, the pilot would comment "His name was Henry. This is not his story." After shooting down Donald's more advanced plane, he would go on to comment that "Fighter ace, huh? At least you died in the air", pointing back to Donald's death on the USS Yorktown at Coral Sea.

=== Multiplayer ===
Battlestations: Pacific features five new multiplayer modes that can be played with or against other humans or AI-controlled characters online or offline:

- Island capture - Each team starts with one or two Headquarters as their main bases to launch units from. Units are brought into the battle by spending Command Points on each unit. There are numerous islands scattered around the map and each one's base can be captured either by paratroopers or seaborne assault. Capturing a base can unlock different unit types or Naval Supplies which are single use items that can enhance your fleet for example arming your ships with more effective ammunition. By holding bases they accumulate points and the game ends when either the time runs out, one team reaches the designated score or one team runs out of bases.
- Duel - This mode allows to fight against other players or the AI in a chosen unit class, last team with a unit left wins.
- Competitive - All players are on the same side with a specific objective to complete but the main goal is to score more than the other players.
- Siege - One team must defend an island with their specific set of units while the other team is in an attacking position. The game ends when one team has drained their resource pool.
- Escort - A key unit (or units) must be protected by one team up to a certain point while the other team is set on destroying the said objective.

== Development ==
In 2008, Battlestations: Midway's main site battlestations.net reported a sequel in development and later that year Battlestations: Pacific was confirmed.

The game's graphics engine has been overhauled. Details now include such things as foliage upon islands, water becoming transparent at shallow depths and a new cockpit view mode.

The game's damage model and physics engine, specifically the water based physics, have been redeveloped to a much higher level of realism than that of its predecessor. Ships split in two, smokestacks and crewmen could be blasted overboard. The wings, tails and engines can be shot off planes.

The game now includes several different types of environment effects, most notably the addition of night, day and other weather effects. Over 100 playable units are included.

A Japanese campaign which reflects plans that the Japanese had constructed if the Pacific War had turned in their favour is included alongside the historical US campaign.

The playability of the game has gained developer attention, with the learning-curve being shortened and the tabs for launching units and repairs was simplified.

=== Release ===
Battlestations: Pacific was released worldwide in May 2009. A demo for Battlestations: Pacific was released on the April 30 for the PC and Xbox 360. The demo contained a mission from the US single player campaign (Divine Winds of Leyte) as well as two multiplayer modes to play in Skirmish mode.

Battlestations: Pacific was added to the Xbox One Backward Compatibility program on January 10, 2019. The digital re-release on Xbox One came with a price tag of $24.99. It can also be played on Xbox Series consoles.

== Reception ==
Reception

Aggregate score
Aggregator	Score		
Aggregator	Macintosh	PC	Xbox 360
Metacritic	N/A	74/100	76/100

Review scores
Publication	Score		
Publication	Macintosh	PC	Xbox 360
Eurogamer	N/A	N/A	7/10
Famitsu	N/A	N/A	29/40
Game Informer	N/A	6/10	6/10
GamePro	N/A	N/A	4/5
GameSpot	N/A	8/10	8/10
GameTrailers	N/A	N/A	8.2/10
GameZone	N/A	N/A	7.6/10
Giant Bomb	N/A	3/5	3/5
IGN	N/A	7.7/10	7.7/10
Macworld	3/5	N/A	N/A
Official Xbox Magazine (UK)	N/A	N/A	7/10
PC Gamer (UK)	N/A	80%	N/A
VideoGamer.com	N/A	N/A	8/10
Digital Spy	N/A	N/A	3/5
Teletext Gamecentral	N/A	8/10	N/A

The Xbox 360 version received "generally favorable reviews", while the PC version received "average" reviews, according to the review aggregation website Metacritic. Eurogamer said that the former "still has much to recommend underneath the flaws...the pleasures it does offer are enhanced by the knowledge that it's still the only game offering them". GameSpot summarised that the game "is a sequel done right: It's just as fun, but it's bigger, broader, and more fully realized". In Japan, where the game was ported and published by Spike on May 28, 2009 (the same release date as the Australian version), Famitsu and Famitsu X360 gave it a score of 29 out of 40.

411Mania gave the Xbox 360 version 8.2 out of 10, saying that it "exceeds in almost all the areas Midway did not. It creates a new kind of action-strategy hybrid, and goes places most games don't." The A.V. Club gave the same Xbox 360 version a B, saying, "The waters are choppy at first, but Pacific is deeper than it looks."

Eidos acknowledged some small technical issues, resulting in developing a patch to fix said issues which was released before any other downloadable content.

== Expansion packs ==
Battlestations Pacific has seen the release of three expansion packs after release. These expansion packs could be downloaded from Xbox Live Marketplace. These DLCs can be found inside a few user-compiled mod packs for the PC version at Mod DB.

- Battlestations: Pacific - Volcano Map Pack (1st DLC)

Release date: Jun 11, 2009. 2 maps: Volcano Map, Choke Point Map.

- Battlestations: Pacific - Mustang Pack (2nd DLC)

Release date: Jul 2, 2009. 6 units; 9 US pin-up nose arts & 9 Japanese nose arts for vehicles. Included units: P-51 Mustang, G5N Liz long range bomber, Alaska-class cruiser, Montana-class battleship, Kuma torpedo cruiser, Super Yamato-class battleship.

- Battlestations: Pacific - Carrier Battles Map Pack (3rd DLC)

Release date: Jul 23, 2009. 4 maps: they are set in Midway, Philippine Island, Leyte Gulf, Aleutian Islands.
