= Desert Rats vs. Afrika Korps =

2004 video game

- European cover art featuring Bernard Montgomery (on the right) and Erwin Rommel (on the left)
- Developer: Digital Reality
- Publishers: Encore Software; Monte Cristo; Atari Interactive
- Platform: Microsoft Windows
- Release: NA: March 30, 2004; EU: April 8, 2004
- Genre: Real-time tactics
- Modes: Single-player, multiplayer

Desert Rats vs. Afrika Korps, released as Afrika Korps vs. Desert Rats outside the UK and U.S., is a real-time tactics game that is based on the North African campaign of World War II. The single player missions are playable as the German Afrika Korps or the British Desert Rats. There is also an option for online multiplayer.

== Gameplay ==
This real-time, tactical combat game's playable factions included the German and British armies. The game focused on desert battles. It could render beautiful graphics and a large number of units, as well as fully destructible environments. Previews praised the excellent music in it. It has 20 missions in two campaigns, although the missions were only loosely based on historical battles. Multiplayer support for up to four players was planned.

There are more than 70 units true to history included. Infantry can interact with vehicles including getting into tanks. Players can attempt to disable enemy's vehicles, and capture and repair them with own infantry.

== Reception ==
Reception

Aggregate score
Aggregator	Score
Metacritic	70/100

Review scores
Publication	Score
Computer Gaming World	3/5
Game Informer	6/10
GameSpot	6.6/10
GameSpy	3/5
IGN	7.2/10
PC Format	68%
PC Gamer (UK)	79%
PC Gamer (US)	74%
PC Zone	70%
X-Play	3/5

The game received "average" reviews according to the review aggregation website Metacritic.

== See also ==
- D-Day (2004 video game)
