= Tamás Kreiner =

Hungarian musician

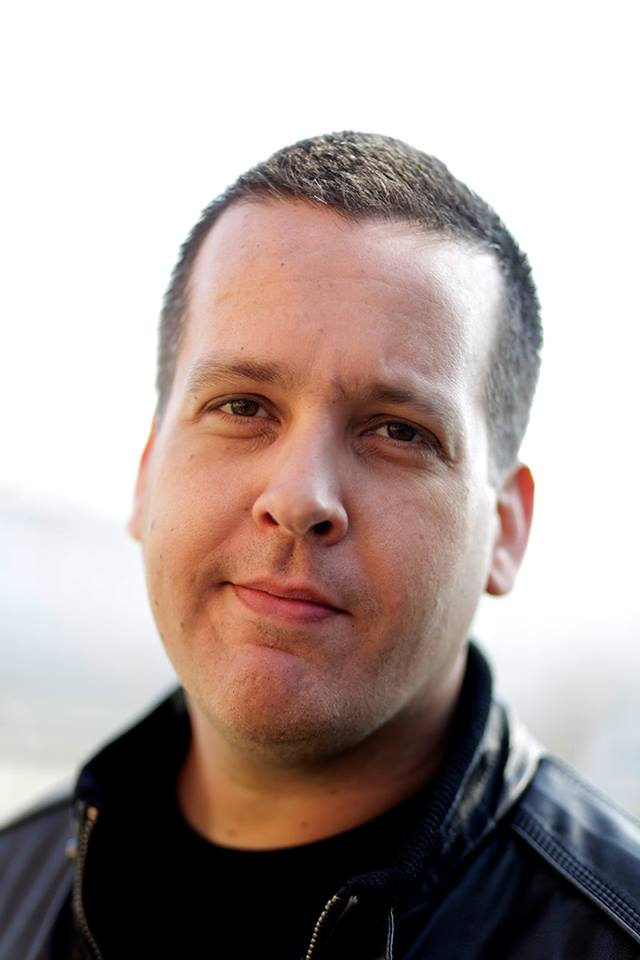
Tamas Kreiner

Tamás Kreiner music composer and sound designer, appreciated by BAFTA awards. As a music composer, his fields of expertise range within computer and console games, cinematic movies, short movies, documentaries and commercials, also creation of the entire sound design. His creative work in music composing and sound design has affected millions of players worldwide. He was quite young when he had founded his own company, Digital Reality where he'd been working as sound executive director, sound designer and lead composer for more than 20 years. Throughout these years he participated in many successful and worldwide productions as a composer/sound designer. The biggest appreciation arrived to Tamás when in 2000, he was nominated and announced as winner of BAFTA awards for composing the soundtrack of Imperium Galactica II. There were more than 800 nominees, and the committee of British Movie Academy, led by Sir Richard Attenborough, picked Tamás's work among all making him the only composer in Hungary having been awarded by BAFTA Awards. During the years he took part in creating and composing music and made sound design for more than 40 large games, and short and cinema movies, also commercials. Some of his excellent work in games category follow: Imperium Galactica series, Haegemonia - Legion of Iron, Platoon, D-Day, and War Front. In 2007, the jury committee of UPC/AXN (Andy Vajna, Török Ferenc, Pálfi György) has awarded him with the precious 3rd place for his short movie '15 Minutes of Fame. He is also well known of his work in television, he composed soundtracks for various TV shows such as Max's Midnight Movies series, or the Jeux Sans Frontiéres. As a sound designer and editor he also has worked within large cinema movie projects, such as Comrade Drakulich, Zárójelentés and BUÉK.
