= Sine Mora =

2012 video game

- Developers: Digital Reality; Grasshopper Manufacture
- Publishers: Digital Reality: Microsoft Studios (X360); Kalypso Media (PC); THQ Nordic (EX)
- Director: Theodore Reiker
- Producer: Shuji Ishikawa
- Designer: Theodore Reiker
- Writer: Theodore Reiker
- Composer: Akira Yamaoka
- Platforms: Xbox 360: Windows; PlayStation 3; PlayStation Vita; iOS; Ouya; Android; PlayStation 4; Xbox One; Nintendo Switch
- Release: March 21, 2012: Xbox 360; March 21, 2012; Windows; November 9, 2012; August 8, 2017 (EX); PS3, PSV; NA: November 20, 2012; EU: November 21, 2012 iOS; July 16, 2013; Ouya; August 13, 2013; Android; August 16, 2013; PlayStation 4, Xbox One; August 8, 2017; Nintendo Switch; NA: September 26, 2017; EU: October 10, 2017
- Genre: Shoot 'em up
- Mode: Single-player

Sine Mora (Note: Japanese: シネモラ, Hepburn: Shine Mora) is a shoot 'em up video game developed by Digital Reality and Grasshopper Manufacture for the Xbox 360, Windows, PlayStation 3, PlayStation Vita and iOS. It was released on March 21, 2012, for the Xbox 360 via Xbox Live Arcade, on November 20, 2012, for PlayStation 3 and PlayStation Vita via the PlayStation Network, on July 16, 2013, for iOS via iTunes Store, as well as Windows, and on August 13, 2013, for the Ouya. The game is a 2.5D shooter; gameplay is restricted to two axes while the environment is rendered in 3D. The setting has been described as diesel punk inspired and features anthropomorphic characters.

The game was well received by critics. Critics found the story confusing, but praised the overall gameplay. Specifically the shoot 'em up mechanic, time-based mechanic and boss battles received high marks. Reviewers also lauded the game's visuals.

On March 3, 2017, THQ Nordic unveiled Sine Mora EX, (Note: Japanese: シネモラ EX, Hepburn: Shine Mora EX) an extended version of Sine Mora for Nintendo Switch, PlayStation 4, Windows and Xbox One. The game was a surprise announcement to debut in PAX East 2017. It was released on August 8, 2017, and the Switch version released on September 26, 2017, in North America and October 10, 2017, in Europe.

== Gameplay ==
Sine Mora is a 2.5D shoot'em up. While the environment and objects are rendered in 3D, gameplay runs along a 2D plane.

Sine Mora (Latin meaning, "without delay") is a side scrolling shoot 'em up game. The player controls an airplane along two axes while attacking enemies. The gameplay world is rendered in 3D, and at key points an in-game cutscene plays in which the camera and plane move. These are often transitions into another part of the gameplay world, but are also used to give the player a new perspective for things such as boss battles. The plane's primary weapons can be upgraded, and players are equipped with a limited-use, more powerful secondary weapon to eliminate more on-screen enemies at one time. Consecutive kills with the primary weapon will increase the game's score multiplier, while use of the secondary weapon or time manipulation will reset the multiplier. The player's final score is determined by a number of factors including kills, damage taken, and powerups collected.

As the game is marketed as a bullet hell shooter it features four difficulties: normal, challenging, hard and insane. The normal difficulty reduces the on-screen ordnance from enemies, while the insane difficulty is geared towards those who are veterans of the genre. In this difficulty the ordnance on the screen is much higher, forcing a greater difficulty level. In addition, four game modes are included: Story, Arcade, Score Attack, and Boss Training. Story mode is the primary mode of the game and allows the player to see the narrative as the game progresses. On the standard difficulty players are given eight continues, while the Insane difficulty yields only five. Completing levels on the more challenging difficulty unlocks an alternate narrative. Arcade mode removes the narrative cutscenes and limits the player to only three continues. Score Attack mode allows players to replay any stage previously completed with only one life. The objective is to achieve the highest score possible and complete the stage. Players do not progress to the next stage after completion in this mode. Boss Training allows players to practice and/or replay any unlocked boss battles. Continues in this mode are unlimited.

Sine Mora does not use a traditional player health mechanic. It instead plays on the aspect of time. Each level is given a set amount of time which continues to tick downwards. Taking damage will temporarily speed up this process, while eliminating enemies will add time back. Powerups in the game can provide bonuses such as shielding, extra time, and upgraded weapon. Players can choose from multiple characters and planes, and the combination of choices determines the vital statistics during play. Characters are not tied to a specific plane, rather characters and planes each have unique attributes, the combination of which determines the statistics.

== Synopsis ==
Sine Mora features two plots running at different points in time. The first features a father bent on taking revenge on the Empire that executed his son for being the sole pilot that refused to drop a nuclear bomb during an attack on the Enkies. The second features the last survivors of the Enkie race also plotting revenge on the Empire for destroying them. The game stages are often set at the same locations, in noticeably different states due to being set in different eras.

The game takes place on the planet of Seol, which is much like Earth. It differs in that its crust is so unstable it often causes quakes that radically reshape its geography in a small amount of time. Albeit originally split into four great nations, by the time the plot unfolds two factions are locked in the Eternal War: the aggressive and dictatorial Layil Empire and the Atarach Kingdom of the Enkie race. Following the teachings of the great prophet Enki, the Enkie are renowned for their unique talent of manipulating time, to the point of being able to transport any item or even themselves to any point into the past or even the future. Over time, however, the Empire develops "The Project", a machine capable of manipulating time. The apparatus is capable of arbitrarily accelerating an item's or even living being's time flow to the point of literally erasing it from existence. Stored inside the floating fortress-city of Siriad, the Project uses every military vehicle of the Layil as a relay, creating a weapon that cannot be effectively disabled. This advantage has allowed the Empire to cut through Enkie defenses, culminating in a vicious (presumably) nuclear bombardment of the Atarach kingdom.

In the "normal" narrative, which encompasses the player's first playthrough, Ronotra Koss is mourning the death of his son, Argus Pytel, at the hands of his crewmates as he refused, during the flight of the bomber Cobalt King, to drop a nuclear bomb upon the Enkie capital city; embittered and vengeful, Koss mans a stolen Sine Mora school "Merenstein" plane and, with the help of a smuggled combat artificial intelligence, GARAI 74/22876, starts to systematically infiltrate Layil Empire structures and eliminate officers involved with his son's demise, all the while exacting a bloody revenge on the Empire which abandoned him after an incident left him an amputee. Finally reaching the city of Tira, capital of the Empire, he mercilessly destroys most of its military force, finally facing the colossal Domus assault fortress manned by the officer who killed Argus, managing to destroy it after maneuvering through its defenses and blowing up the power cores.

The parallel storyline involves Akyta Dryad and an ensemble of surviving Enkie resistance fighters unleashing a series of guerrilla attacks on the empire, bent on stopping the Project. Most of the locations are visited after Ronotra Koss' exploits, featuring a much more ruined look and stronger resistance by Empire forces. Resistance fighters fall one after another, either captured or killed in action, dealing a series of crippling blows to the Layil who, however, seemingly recover from each with minimal actual consequences save for structure damage. Infiltrating Siriad, the Empire's floating fortress-city, Akyta, then the sole survivor, reaches the main chamber housing the Project apparatus; there, she is horrified to find two million Enkie survivors connected to machinery, heavily drugged and genetically altered, their natural time manipulating capabilities being channeled to fuel the Empire's temporal gravitation weapons. Fighting the facility's guardian and controller, Ophan, she manages to end the threat of the weapon, leaving Layil unable to use time manipulation.

In a shocking twist however, the entire chain of events is revealed to have been engineered by none other than Argus Pytel himself: a top ranking intelligence officer and a Collaborationist, he engineered for both Resistance groups to embark on suicidal missions, confident of the Empire's chance to recover quickly from any damage via its control over the timeline. The rebel crew member aboard the Cobalt King was actually killed by Pytel and not the other way around, a fact he took advantage of to trick his father's faction into action. The plan however took yet another unexpected turn when, surprising the attacker of the Domus and shooting him down with a barrage of missiles, he was horrified to discover he had just killed his own father. Meanwhile, approximately a thousand years later, Akyta was herself met with a defeat as the Ophan, upon critically malfunctioning, activated the Project's self-destruct system, detonating the facility and killing the Enkie slaves, effectively eradicating the entire Enkie race.

The "alternate" narrative is more of an alternate ending: following his father Ronotra Koss' death by his own hands, Argus starts devising a plan of his own to exact revenge on the Empire: using his knowledge of past events and the Project equipment, he traveled forward in time to before Akyta could destroy the Ophan, having her travel 4200 years into the past and saving her life before destroying the facility himself (and dying in the process). Sine Mora ends with the same opening cinematic, revealing Argus as the pilot of the King Cobalt: however, Akyta is revealed to be pregnant, and to have given birth to none other than Enki himself, thus bringing the entire story full circle.

== Development and marketing ==
The transition from concept art (top) to actual gameplay (bottom) was praised by critics.

Sine Mora was announced August 18, 2010. It was developed via a partnership between Grasshopper Manufacture and Digital Reality. Grasshopper was responsible for the art direction and sound design, while Digital Reality handled the 3D assets, programming, story and game design. The game is available on both the Xbox 360 and PlayStation 3 via their respective downloadable networks.

The art style for the game is diesel punk inspired. The boss battles for the game were initially designed in large part by Mahiro Maeda, an anime artist known for his work on The Animatrix, Kill Bill, and Neon Genesis Evangelion. Gez Fry directed the game's art and designed the characters, with input from Yoshiro Kimura. The characters were designed as humanoid animals due to Fry's impression that the game was "not crazy enough." "Our characters were originally human characters" stated Theodore Reiker, Creative Director at Digital Reality. "One day he approached me with the idea of having anthropomorphic characters — animals."

Reiker cited several bullet hell shooters, such as Battle Garegga, Einhänder, and Under Defeat as influences for the game. "Sine Mora is our tribute to the amazing games that we played over the last 30 years" said Reiker. The designers originally voiced the characters in Hungarian as a placeholder for other languages, however the idea appealed to them so much that they kept the language and provided translations via subtitles for non-Hungarian speaking players. Akira Yamaoka of Grasshopper Manufacture, best known for his music in the Silent Hill series, scored the game's music. Yamaoka was inspired by 1970s electronic music and used that to create the score to match the diesel-punk setting. Of the soundtrack he stated, "I had to create something that would be worthy for this game as well as sound that could actually enhance the game when matched with the visuals."

Digital Reality held a contest where fans could guess the game's release date. Those who guessed correctly would get a chance to receive a free copy of the game. The winner was determined from a lottery based on the score a team member had while playing through the game. Sine Mora was shown at Gamescom and Penny Arcade Expo (PAX). T-shirts and other promotional merchandise were given away at PAX. Contests for the merchandise were also conducted via the game's official Facebook page.

Prior to the E3 2012 convention, it was announced that Sine Mora will also be released on the PlayStation Vita. This version contains a new hero, Wilhelmine Muller, coming from the world of "Under Defeat", with a new weapon and chromosomes. It was later announced that the game will be available for the PlayStation 3 as well.

On July 16, 2013, the game has been released on iOS via the iTunes Store by developer Pocket Scientists. Android and Amazon Kindle Fire versions will follow.

== Reception ==
Reception

Aggregate scores
| Aggregator | Score |
|---|---|
| GameRankings | 84.93% |
| Metacritic | 85/100 |

Review scores
| Publication | Score |
|---|---|
| Eurogamer | 9/10 |
| GamesRadar+ | 7/10 |
| IGN | 9/10 |
| Joystiq | 4.5/5 |
| VideoGamer.com | 8/10 |

Sine Mora received generally favorable reviews from critics. It currently holds a score of 84.93% at aggregate website GameRankings, while fellow aggregate site Metacritic reports a score of 85/100. The highest score, an approval rating of 95%, came from Chris Carter of Gamer Limit, while the lowest score of 60% approval was shared by the reviewer from Gameblog.Fr and Simon Campanello of Eurogamer Sweden. The majority of reviews rated the game with an 80% approval rating or higher.

Several of Sine Mora's gameplay mechanics were praised by critics. Daemon Hatfield of IGN praised the variety of modes, particularly the game's Boss Training mode, which he felt would prove useful to serious players. Richard Mitchell of Joystiq praised the game's time-based mechanics in particular. He felt that it gives "players a new spin on an age-old formula." GamesRadar's Sterling McGarvey felt that the game was challenging yet fun. He also gave high marks for the gameplay and presentation during boss fights. VideoGamer.com's Sinan Kubba also praised the boss fights, citing the multiple attack sequences and 3D transitions as high points.

The game's plot was confusing for some reviewers. IGN's Daemon Hatfield stated that he found the story "hard to follow." Dan Whitehead, reviewer for Eurogamer, agreed that the story was difficult to follow. He also felt that there were instances where the player had too much text to read, and this made following the story more difficult. Joystiq's Richard Mitchell noted, however, that understanding the story is not essential to enjoying the game. Sine Mora's visuals received generally high marks. Daemon Hatfield of IGN noted that the game is detailed enough that players "can see each individual shell drop from [their] ship as you fire". Eurogamer's Dan Whitehead called the game "perhaps the most visually stunning shooter ever made".
