= EidosMedia =

Italian software company

EidosMedia S.p.A.
- Type: Private
- Industry: Software industry
- Headquarters: Milan, Italy
- Website: www.eidosmedia.com

EidosMedia S.p.A. is a publishing software company. Established in 1999, the company maintains headquarters in Milan, Italy with offices internationally. Its main products are used by large media companies and include Méthode, a content management system and Cobalt, a digital delivery framework.

== History ==
Eidosmedia was founded in 1999 and purchased by Hg Capital in 2015.

== Software ==
EidosMedia's flagship product is Méthode, a content management system for multimedia publishing that is mainly used by large news organizations. The product is based on the XML markup language. It also provides a digital delivery framework known as Cobalt. Its software is also available in the cloud.

Early customers were Il Sole 24 Ore, RCS MediaGroup and Adnkronos in Italy, with the first international client to purchase Méthode being the Financial Times of London in 2002. Other news organizations include The Wall Street Journal, The Washington Post, and The Boston Globe, The Financial Times, The Times and Le Figaro, Les Échos and Le Monde, as well as national and regional publishing groups in Europe, the US, Africa and Asia-Pacific.
