= Digital Reality =

Hungarian video game developer

Digital Reality Software Kft.
- Formerly: Amnesty Design (1991–1997); Digital Reality Kft. (1997–2007)
- Company type: Subsidiary
- Industry: Video games
- Founded: 1991; 35 years ago
- Defunct: 2013
- Fate: Dissolved
- Headquarters: Budapest, Hungary
- Key people: Imre Madarász (CEO)
- Products: Imperium Galactica; Haegemonia: Legions of Iron
- Parent: Docler Holding
- Subsidiaries: Digital Reality Publishing Kft.; Whiz Software Kft.

Digital Reality Software Kft. (formerly Amnesty Design) was a Hungarian video game developer based in Budapest, Hungary. It was founded in 1991 as Amnesty Design, and started to work on their upcoming title, Reunion, which would be released in 1994 by Grandslam Video, for Amiga and MS-DOS. In 1997, leading up to the release of Imperium Galactica, the company changed its name to Digital Reality. In the following decade, games like Haegemonia: Legions of Iron, Platoon, SkyDrift and Desert Rats vs. Afrika Korps were produced, all to positive reception.

In 2006, Digital Reality opened a subsidiary studio, Whiz Software, in cooperation with CDV Software, and in 2011, they spun off a digital distribution subsidiary, Digital Reality Publishing. Digital Reality silently shut down in 2013. In February 2016, Austrian publisher Nordic Games acquired a range of intellectual properties formerly under the Digital Reality banner, including Black Knight Sword, Imperium Galactica and Sine Mora.

== Games developed ==
Year	Title	Publisher	Platform
1994	Reunion	Grandslam Video	Amiga, MS-DOS
1997	Imperium Galactica	GT Interactive	Microsoft Windows
1999	Imperium Galactica II: Alliances	GT Interactive	Microsoft Windows
2002	Haegemonia: Legions of Iron	Dreamcatcher Interactive	Microsoft Windows
2002	Platoon	Monte Cristo	Microsoft Windows
2003	Haegemonia: The Solon Heritage	Wanadoo Edition	Microsoft Windows
2004	Desert Rats vs. Afrika Korps	Monte Cristo	Microsoft Windows
2004	D-Day	Monte Cristo	Microsoft Windows
2006	War on Terror	Deep Silver	Microsoft Windows
2007	War Front: Turning Point	CDV Software	Microsoft Windows
2010	Scarabeus: Pearls of Nile	DR Publishing	iOS
2010	Liberty Wings	DR Publishing	iOS
2011	Dead Block	Candygun Games, DR Publishing	Xbox 360, PlayStation 3, Microsoft Windows
2011	SkyDrift	DR Publishing	Xbox 360, PlayStation 3, Microsoft Windows
2012	Sine Mora	co-developed by Grasshopper Manufacture	Xbox 360, PlayStation 3, PlayStation Vita, Ouya, Microsoft Windows
2012	Black Knight Sword	co-developed by Grasshopper Manufacture	PlayStation 3, Xbox 360
2012	Bang Bang Racing	co-developed by Playbox	PlayStation 3, Xbox 360, Microsoft Windows
Cancelled	Imperium Galactica - Stargazer	None	Microsoft Windows
