= Eidos Hungary =

Hungarian video game developer (2002–2009)

Eidos Hungary Kft.
- Formerly: Mithis Entertainment Kft. (2002–2006)
- Type: Subsidiary
- Industry: Video games
- Founded: March 2002
- Founder: Róbert Sugár
- Defunct: October 2009
- Fate: Dissolved by parent
- Headquarters: Budapest, Hungary
- Key people: Attila Söröss (head of studio)
- Parent: Square Enix Europe (2006–2009)

Eidos Hungary (formerly Mithis Entertainment) was a Hungarian video game developer based in Budapest, Hungary.

== History ==
The company was founded as Mithis Entertainment in March 2002 by former Philos Laboratories employees. Between 2002 and 2006, the studio produced Nexus: The Jupiter Incident (2004), a strategy video game, and Creature Conflict: The Clan Wars (2005), a shooter game. In 2006, British video game publisher Eidos Interactive acquired Mithis Entertainment and renamed it Eidos Hungary. In July 2006, The Sunday Times reported Hungarian authorities investigated intellectual property theft complaints by former Mithis and stakeholder MGE Software. SCi Entertainment categorically denied wrongdoing, stating the article confused Battlestations: Midway and Joint Task Force to clarify. SCi took over the development after being dissatisfied with MGE by exercised its contractual right, which MGE demanded compensation for prompting the allegation according to SCi.

On 19 April 2010, Square Enix Europe confirmed that they had shut down Eidos Hungary in October 2009, due to the discontinuation of the Battlestations franchise. The CEO of Square Enix Europe, Phil Rogers, said "We were pleased with Eidos Hungary, but I think we realised that to be first or best in the RTS genre was going to be really challenging. It wasn't necessarily something we were going to win".

== Games developed ==
- Nexus: The Jupiter Incident (2004)
- Creature Conflict: The Clan Wars (2005)
- Battlestations: Midway (2007)
- Battlestations: Pacific (2009)
